= Nizhegorodskaya railway station =

Railway station

Nizhegorodskaya Нижегородская
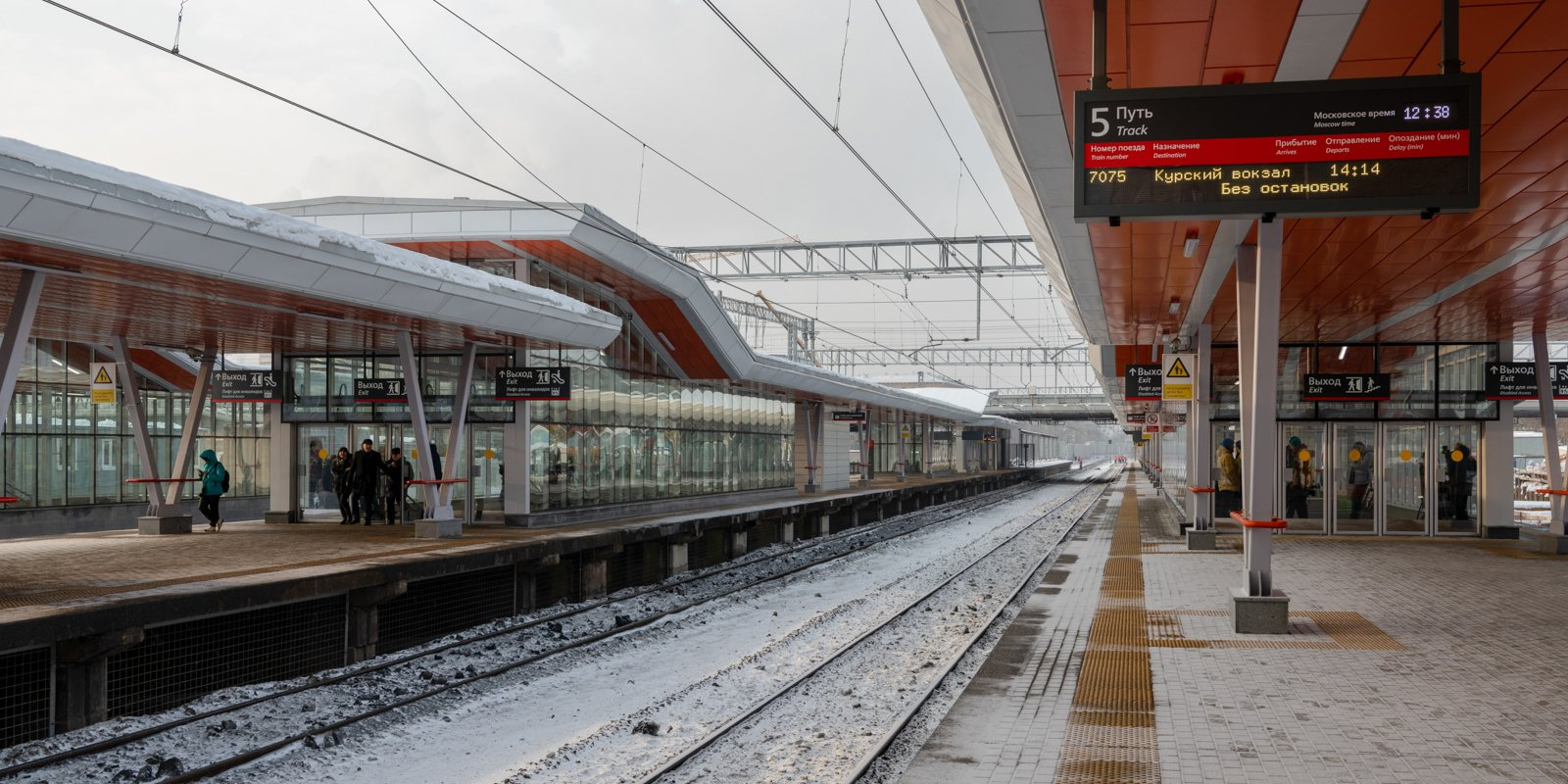

General information
- Location: Moscow; Russia
- Coordinates: 55.7333°N 37.7296°E
- System: Moscow Railway station
- Owner: Russian Railways
- Operator: Moscow Railway
- Line: Gorkovsky Suburban Line
- Connections: Nizhegorodskaya; Nizhegorodskaya

History
- Opened: 1932
- Rebuilt: 2018

Services
| Preceding station | Russian Railways | Following station |
|---|---|---|
| Serp i Molot towards Moscow Kursky | Gorkovsky Suburban | Chukhlinka towards Vladimir |
| Preceding station | Moscow Central Diameters | Following station |
Proposed
| Chukhlinka towards Zheleznodorozhnaya | Line D4 | Serp i Molot towards Aprelevka |
Location

Nizhegorodskaya is a Moscow Railway station of the Gorkovsky suburban railway line in Moscow, Russia. It was opened in 1932 and rebuilt in 2018. It was formerly known as Karacharovo (Russian: Карачарово).

== Gallery ==
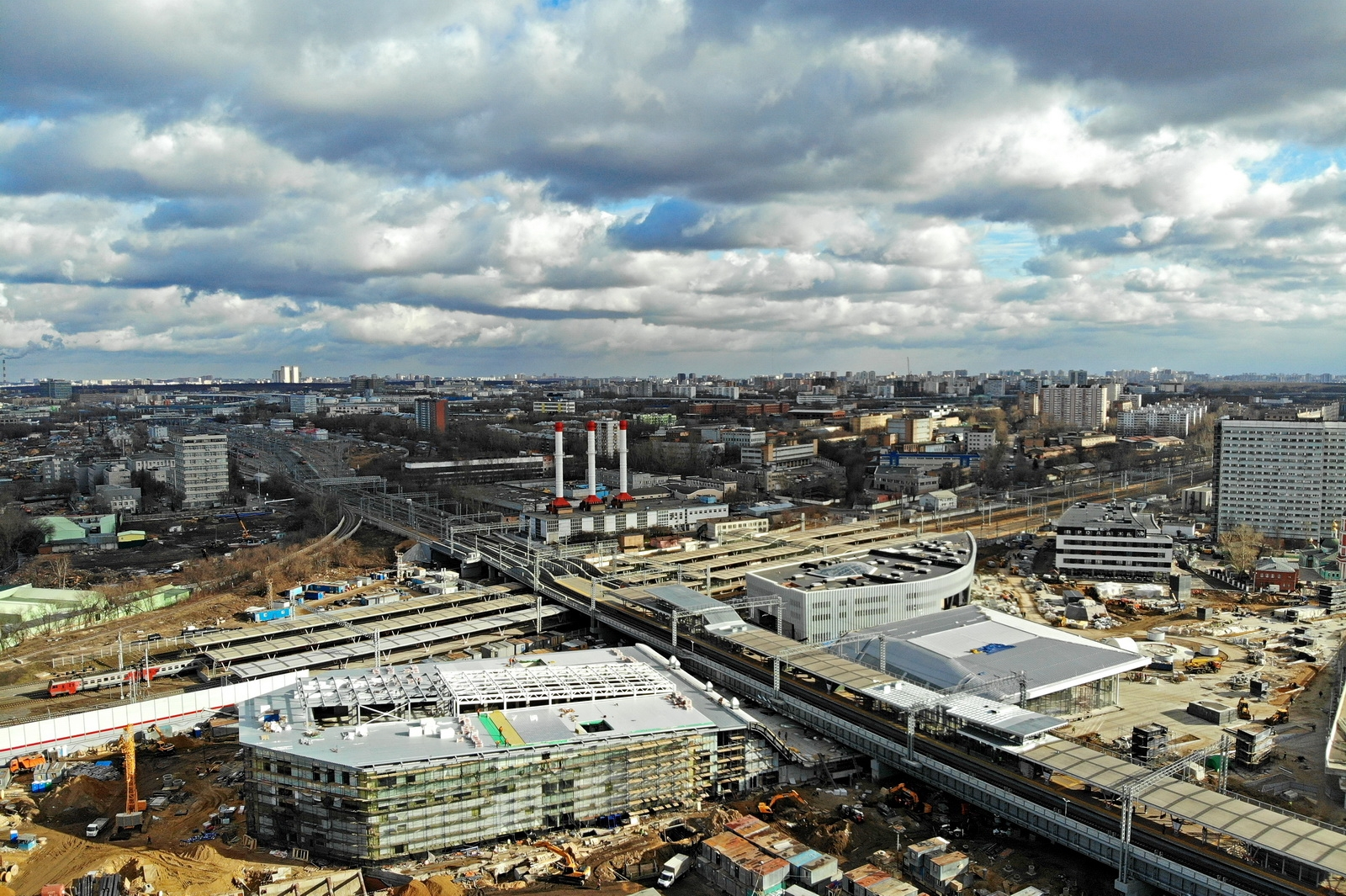
Nizhegorodskaya railway station in 2020. It is located in the lower level. Nizhegorodskaya metro station of the Bolshaya Koltsevaya and Nekrasovskaya lines is located underground while Nizhegorodskaya metro station of the Moscow Central Circle is in the upper level.

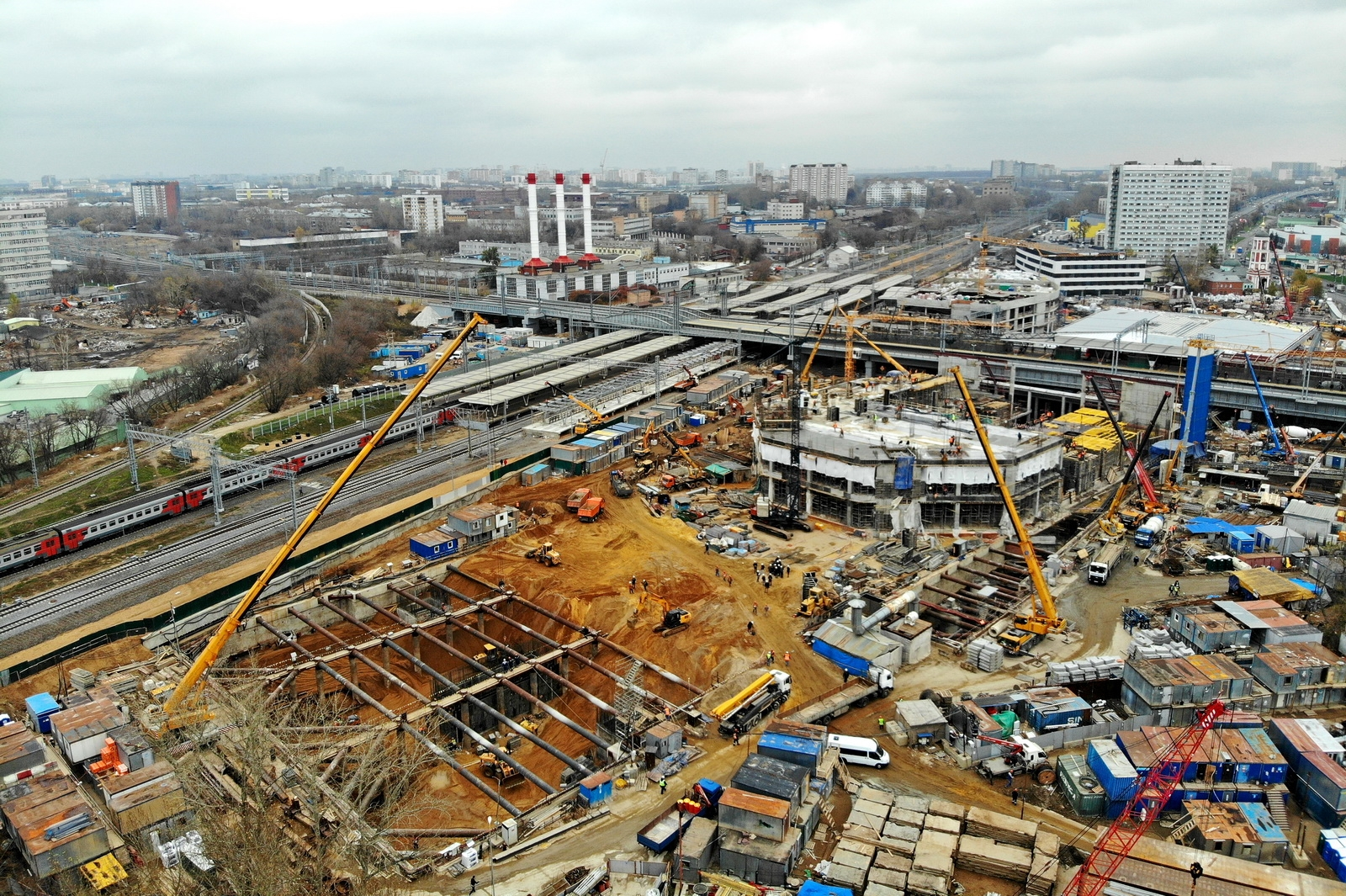
Ryazanskaya transport hub under construction in October 2019. A third platform of Nizhegorodskaya railway station is being completed.
