= Serp i Molot railway station =

Railway station in Moscow

Serp i Molot Серп и Молот

General information
- Location: Moscow; Russia
- Coordinates: 55.7479°N 37.6825°E
- System: Moscow Railway station
- Owner: Russian Railways
- Operator: Moscow Railway
- Connections: Ploshchad Ilyicha; Rimskaya

History
- Opened: 1936

Services
Preceding station	Russian Railways	Following station
Moscow Kursky Terminus	Gorkovsky Suburban	Nizhegorodskaya towards Vladimir
Preceding station	Moscow Central Diameters	Following station
Proposed
Moscow Kursky towards Nakhabino	Line D2	Kalitniki towards Podolsk
Nizhegorodskaya towards Zheleznodorozhnaya	Line D4	Moscow Kursky towards Aprelevka
Location

Serp i Molot (Russian: Серп и Молот, "hammer and sickle") is a Moscow Railway station of the Gorkovskaya line and prospective station on Line D2 and D4 of the Moscow Central Diameters in Moscow, Russia. It was opened in 1936 and will be rebuilt by late 2024.

== Gallery ==
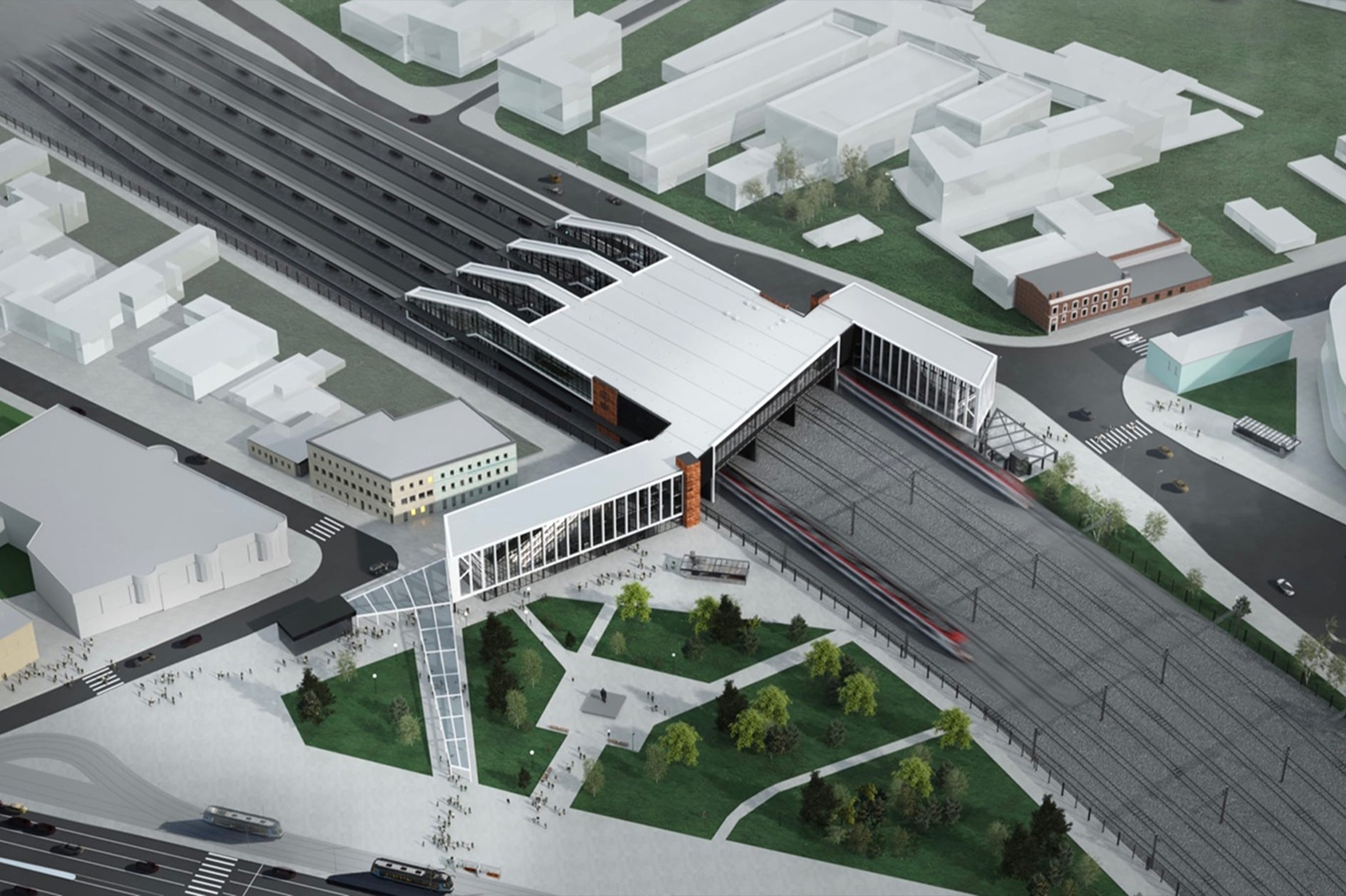
The project of a new station
