= Moskva-City railway station, MCD4 =

Planned railway station

Moskva-City Москва-Сити
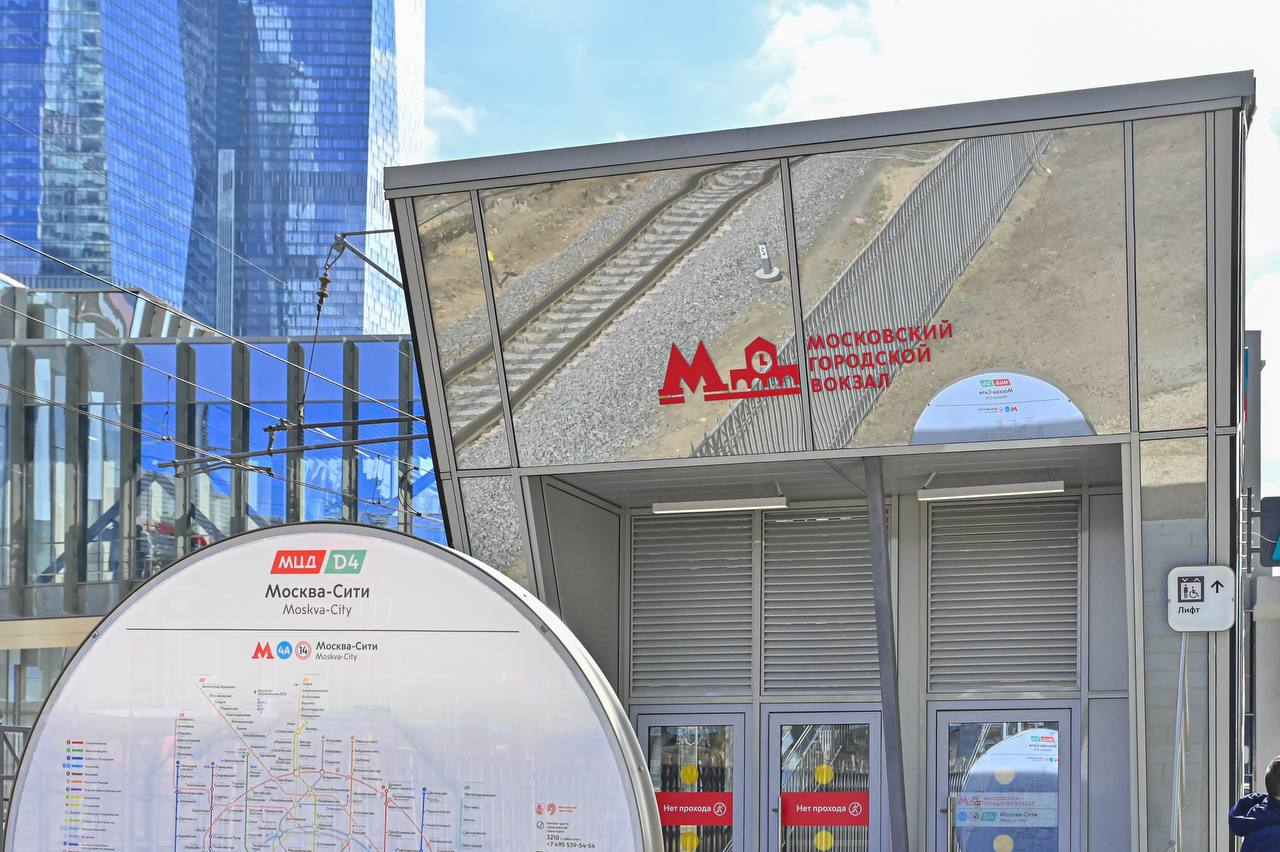
- Northern vestibule of Moskva-City station

General information
- Location: Moscow; Russia
- System: Moscow Railway station
- Owner: Russian Railways
- Operator: Moscow Railway

History
- Opened: 2023
- Former names: Testovskaya

Services
Preceding station	Moscow Central Diameters	Following station
Proposed
Yermakova Roshcha towards Zheleznodorozhnaya	Line D4	Kutuzovskaya towards Aprelevka
Location

Moskva-City is a railway station of Line D4 of the Moscow Central Diameters.
