= Kuchino railway station =

Railway station in Balashikha, Russia

Kuchino Кучино
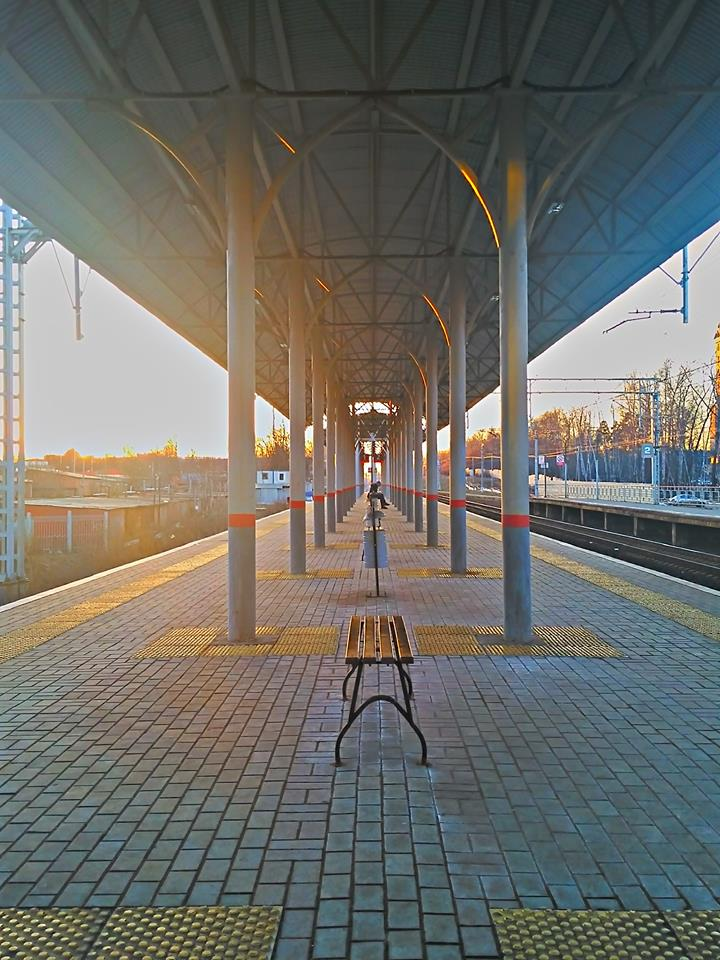
- The outbound platform

General information
- Location: Kuchino, Balashikha Urban Okrug, Moscow Oblast; Russia
- Coordinates: 55.752251°N 37.954880°E
- System: Moscow Railway station
- Owner: Russian Railways
- Operator: Moscow Railway
- Line: Gorkovsky Suburban Line
- Platforms: 2
- Tracks: 3

Construction
- Structure type: At-grade

Other information
- Station code: 2001190
- Fare zone: 3

History
- Opened: 1898

Services
Preceding station	Russian Railways	Following station
Saltykovskaya towards Moscow Kursky	Gorkovsky Suburban	Zheleznodorozhnaya towards Vladimir
Location

Kuchino (Russian: Кучино) is a railway station located in Balashikha Urban Okrug of Moscow Oblast, Russia. The station serves suburban traffic of Gorkovsky suburban railway line. The westbound trains terminate at Moscow Kursky railway station in Moscow. The eastbound trains terminate at the stations of Zheleznodorozhnaya, Kupavna, Fryazevo, Zakharovo, Elektrogorsk, Krutoye, Petushki, and Vladimir. The station is operated by the Moscow Railway.

The next station in the eastern direction is Zheleznodorozhnaya, and the next one in the western direction is Saltykovskaya. Not all suburban trains stop in Kuchino.

The station is located in Kuchino microdistrict of Balashikha, formerly of Zheleznodorozhny, and is oriented in the west–east direction. Two platforms are connected by a tunnel, which on the north side leads to Chaplygina Street, and on the south side leads to Tsentralnaya Street, a major throughway which begins in Moscow as Nosovikhinskoye Highway and runs east to Elektrougli and Yesino where it connects to A107.

== History ==
The station was open in 1898, though the railway between Moscow and Vladimir was in operation since 1861. The name of the station is given by the nearby village, which later became an urban-type settlement, and in 1963, together with the station, was merged into the town of Zheleznodorozhny. The name of the village, known since the 16th century, originates from the owner, Kucha or Kuchin.
