= Moscow Kursky railway station =

Railway station in Moscow, Russia

Moscow–Kursky Москва–Курская
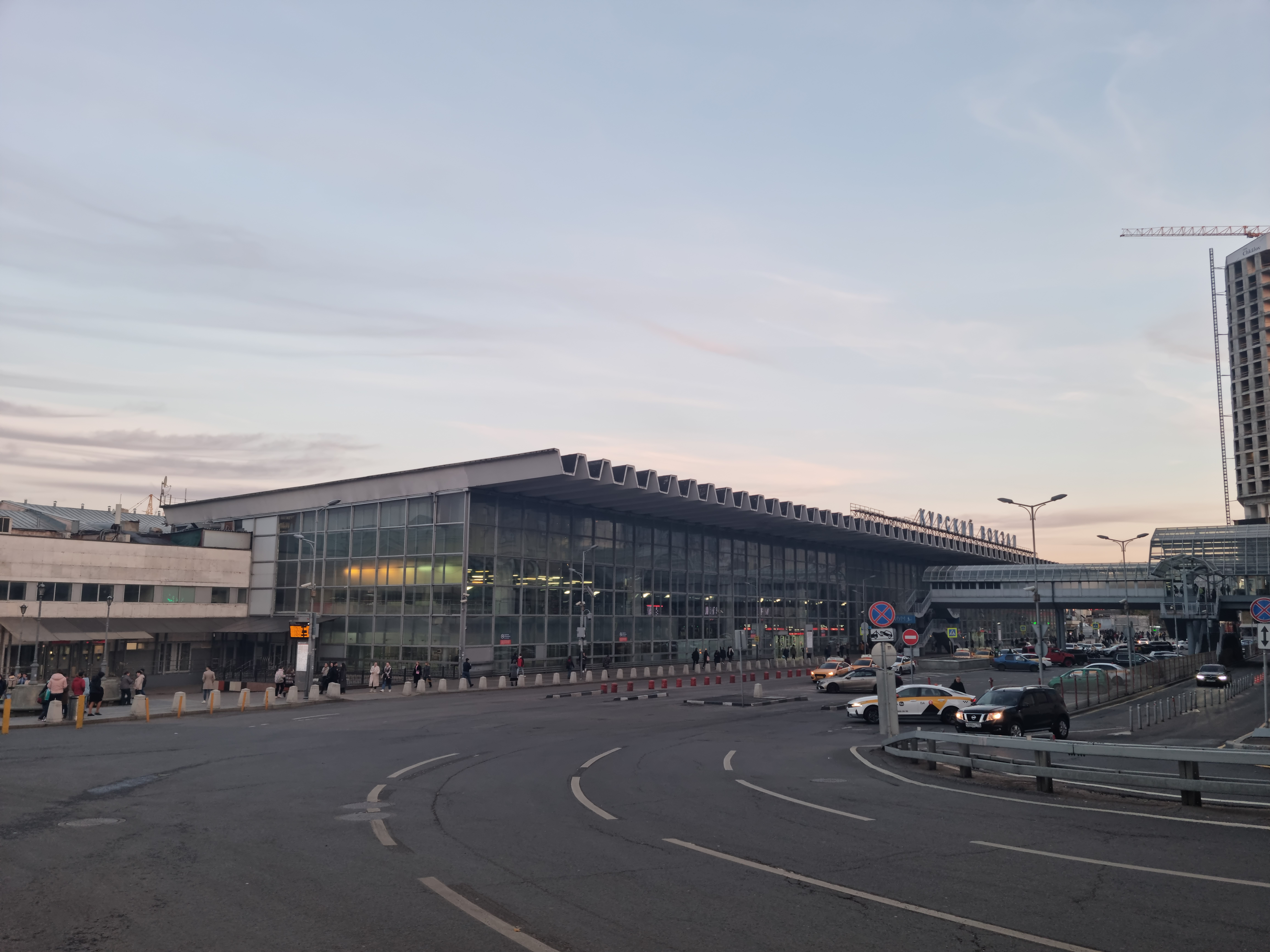
- View of the station's main entrance

General information
- Location: Ploshchad' Kurskogo Vokzala, Moscow; Russia
- Coordinates: 55.7575°N 37.660556°E
- System: Moscow Railway terminal
- Operator: Moscow Railway
- Lines: Alexeyevskaya Connection Line; Gorkovsky Suburban Line; Kursky Suburban Line
- Platforms: 9
- Tracks: 17
- Connections: Moscow Metro stations: Kurskaya; Kurskaya; Chkalovskaya; Tram: 20, 24, Б; Bus: 40, 78, Б

Construction
- Structure type: At-grade

Other information
- Station code: 191602
- Fare zone: 0

History
- Opened: 1896
- Rebuilt: 1938, 1972

Services
Preceding station	Moscow Railway (commuter service)	Following station
Terminus	Gorkovskoye line	Serp i Molot towards Vladimir
Terminus	Kurskoye line	Moskva-Tovarnaya towards Tula
Preceding station	Moscow Central Diameters	Following station
Kalanchyovskaya towards Nakhabino	Line D2	Moskva Tovarnaya towards Podolsk
Future services
Serp i Molot towards Zheleznodorozhnaya	Line D4	Kalanchyovskaya towards Aprelevka
Location
- Location within Moscow Ring Road

Kursky railway terminal (Russian: Ку́рский вокза́л, Kursky vokzal), also known as Moscow Kurskaya railway station (Russian: Москва́-Ку́рская, Moskva-Kurskaya), is one of the ten railway terminals in Moscow. It was built in 1896, and renovated (without major design changes) in 1938, then a large glass facade and modern roof was added in a 1972 expansion. In 2008, there were plans to completely rebuild or refurbish the station. Kursky station, unlike most Moscow terminals, operates two almost opposite railroad directions from Moscow: one toward Kursk, Russia, after which the station is named, that stretches on into Ukraine, and another toward Nizhniy Novgorod, which is less used by long-distance trains, and is mostly for the high-speed service to Nizhniy. Kursky is connected to the Lengradskiy Line from the other side, enabling long-distance trains from St. Petersburg going on to other cities to pass through Russia's capital. Because of its three directions, its adjacency to the city center, and its connection to three major metro lines, Kursky is one of Moscow's busiest railway stations.

== Destinations ==
=== Long distance from Moscow ===
Train number	Train name	Destination	Operated by
057/058	Prioskolye (rus: Приосколье)	(Russia) Valuyki	(Russia) Russian Railways
061/062	Burevestnik-1 (rus: Буревестник-1)	(Russia) Nizhny Novgorod (Moskovsky)	(Russia) Russian Railways
071/072	Belogorye (rus: Белогорье)	(Russia) Belgorod	(Russia) Russian Railways
105/106	Solovey (rus: Соловей)	(Russia) Kursk	(Russia) Russian Railways
119/120	Burevestnik-2 (rus: Буревестник-2)	(Russia) Nizhny Novgorod (Moskovsky)	(Russia) Russian Railways
141/142	Seym (rus: Сейм)	(Russia) Lgov	(Russia) Russian Railways
603/604	Turgenev (rus: Тургенев)	(Russia) Oryol (coach: (Russia) Livny)	(Russia) Russian Railways

=== Long distance via Moscow ===
Train number	Train name	Direction	Operated by
059/060	Volga (rus: Волга)	(Russia) St. Petersburg (Moskovsky) - (Russia) Nizhny Novgorod (Moskovsky)	(Russia) Russian Railways
079/080	Slava (rus: Слава)	(Russia) St. Petersburg (Moskovsky) - (Russia) Volgograd	(Russia) Russian Railways
081/082	Solovey (rus: Соловей)	(Russia) St. Petersburg (Moskovsky) - (Russia) Kursk	(Russia) Russian Railways
107/108	Samara (rus: Самара)	(Russia) St. Petersburg (Moskovsky) - (Russia) Samara	(Russia) Russian Railways

=== High-speed rail ===
Train number	Train name	Direction	Operated by
727/728; 729/730 731/732 733/734	Strizh (rus: Стриж)	(Russia) Moscow (Kursky) - (Russia) Nizhny Novgorod (Moskovsky)	(Russia) Russian Railways
701/702 703/704 705/706 707/708 709/710	Lastochka (rus: Ласточка)	(Russia) Moscow (Kursky) - (Russia) Nizhny Novgorod (Moskovsky)	(Russia) Russian Railways

- Note: Sapsan is now replaced with Talgo Strizh since 2015.

=== Other destinations ===
Country	Destinations
Russia	Adler, Anapa, Astrakhan, Chelyabinsk, Yekaterinburg, Izhevsk, Kazan, Kirov, Kislovodsk, Makhachkala, Murmansk, Novorossiysk, Perm, Serpukhov, Stary Oskol, Tula, Vladimir, Volgograd, Voronezh, Vladikavkaz, Yeysk, Zheleznodorozhny

=== Suburban destinations ===
Suburban commuter trains (elektrichkas) connect Kursky station with the towns of Podolsk, Serpukhov, Chekhov, Tula on Kursky suburban railway line and Reutov (Reutovo), Balashikha, Zheleznodorozhny, Staraya Kupavna (Kupavna), Elektrougli, Elektrostal, Noginsk, Pavlovsky Posad, Elektrogorsk, Orekhovo-Zuyevo, Kirzhach and Pokrov on the Gorkovsky suburban railway line. Besides that, Kursky Station has commuter connections with the Rizhsky and Belorussky suburban railway lines, as well as long-distance connection in the direction of Saint Petersburg, although less frequent.

== Future development plan ==
Platform height rules under the newest GOST standards, DC commuter EMUs dedicated platforms in Moscow urban area must be 1,100 mm (43.3 in), while the platforms for the long-distance trains must be either 200 mm (7.9 in) and 550 mm (21.7 in). Moscow Kurskaya station platforms should get reconstruction soon.

Proposed platform layout:

- Platform 1: Height of 200 mm (7.9 in), Length of 800 metres (2,600 ft)
- Platform 1&2: Height of 200 mm (7.9 in), Length of 800 metres (2,600 ft), very narrow
- Platform 3&4: Height of 550 mm (21.7 in), Length of 800 metres (2,600 ft)
- Platform 5&6: Height of 1,100 mm (43.3 in), Length of 400 metres (1,300 ft)
- Platform 7&8: Height of 1,100 mm (43.3 in), Length of 400 metres (1,300 ft)
- Platform 10&11: Height of 550 mm (21.7 in), Length of 800 metres (2,600 ft)
- Platform 12&13: Height of 200 mm (7.9 in), Length of 800 metres (2,600 ft)
- Platform 14&15: Height of 200 mm (7.9 in), Length of 800 metres (2,600 ft)

== Gallery ==
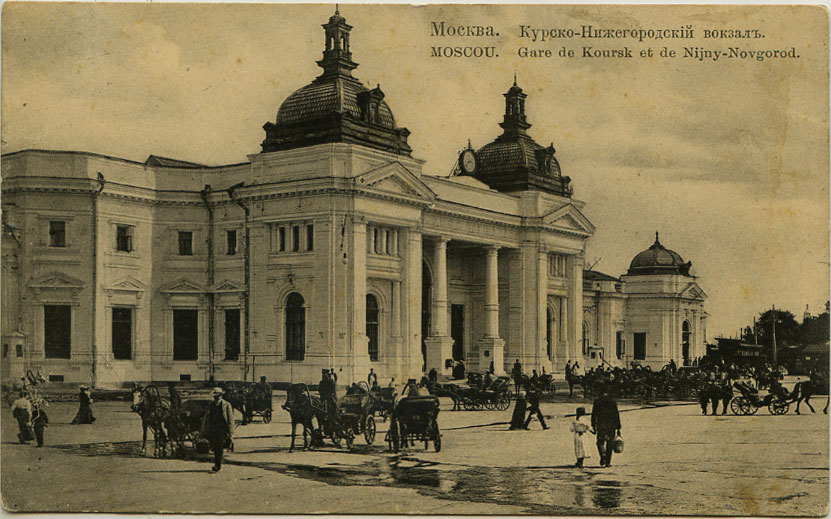
Historical view of the station (1900)

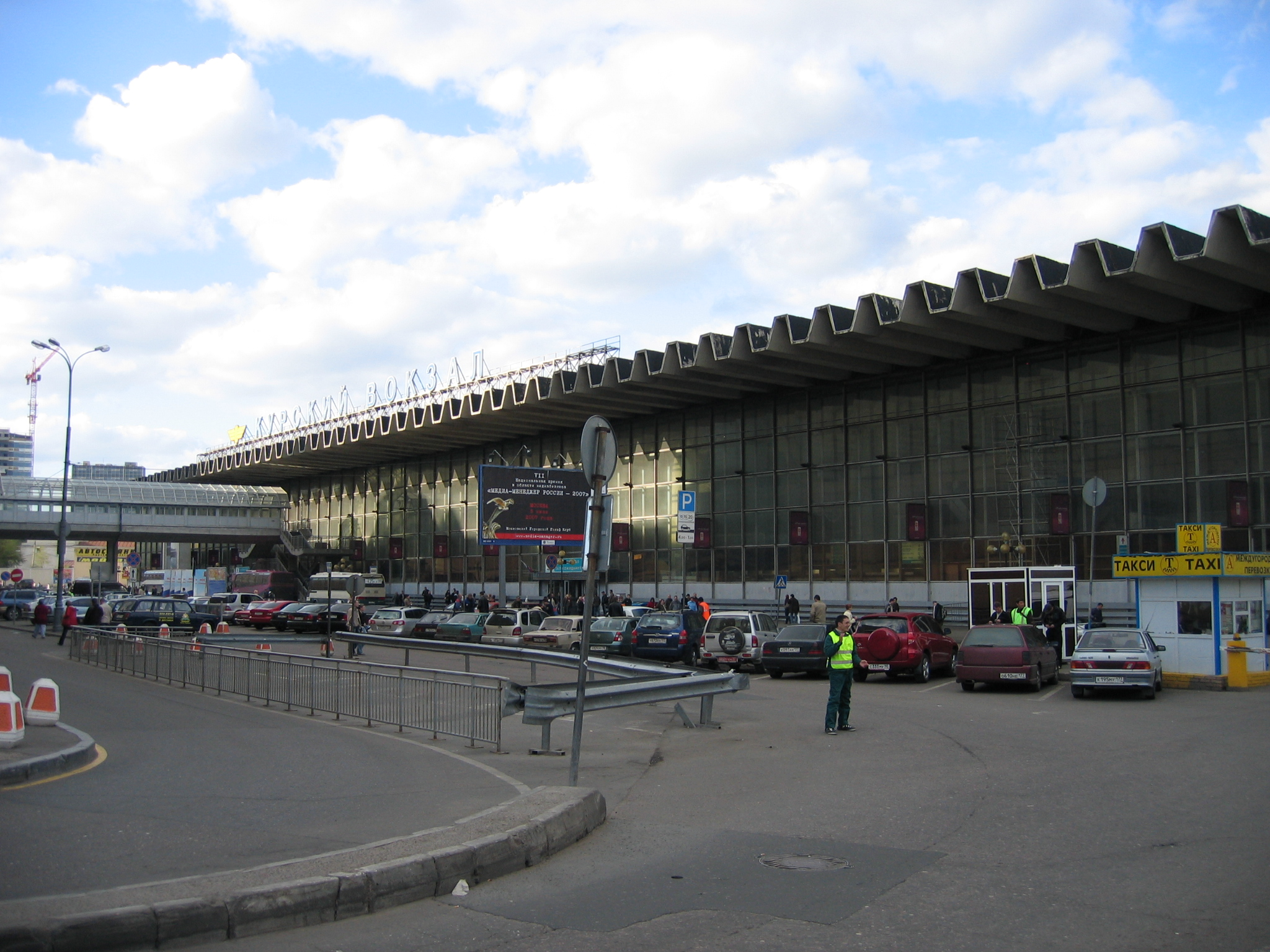
Front view

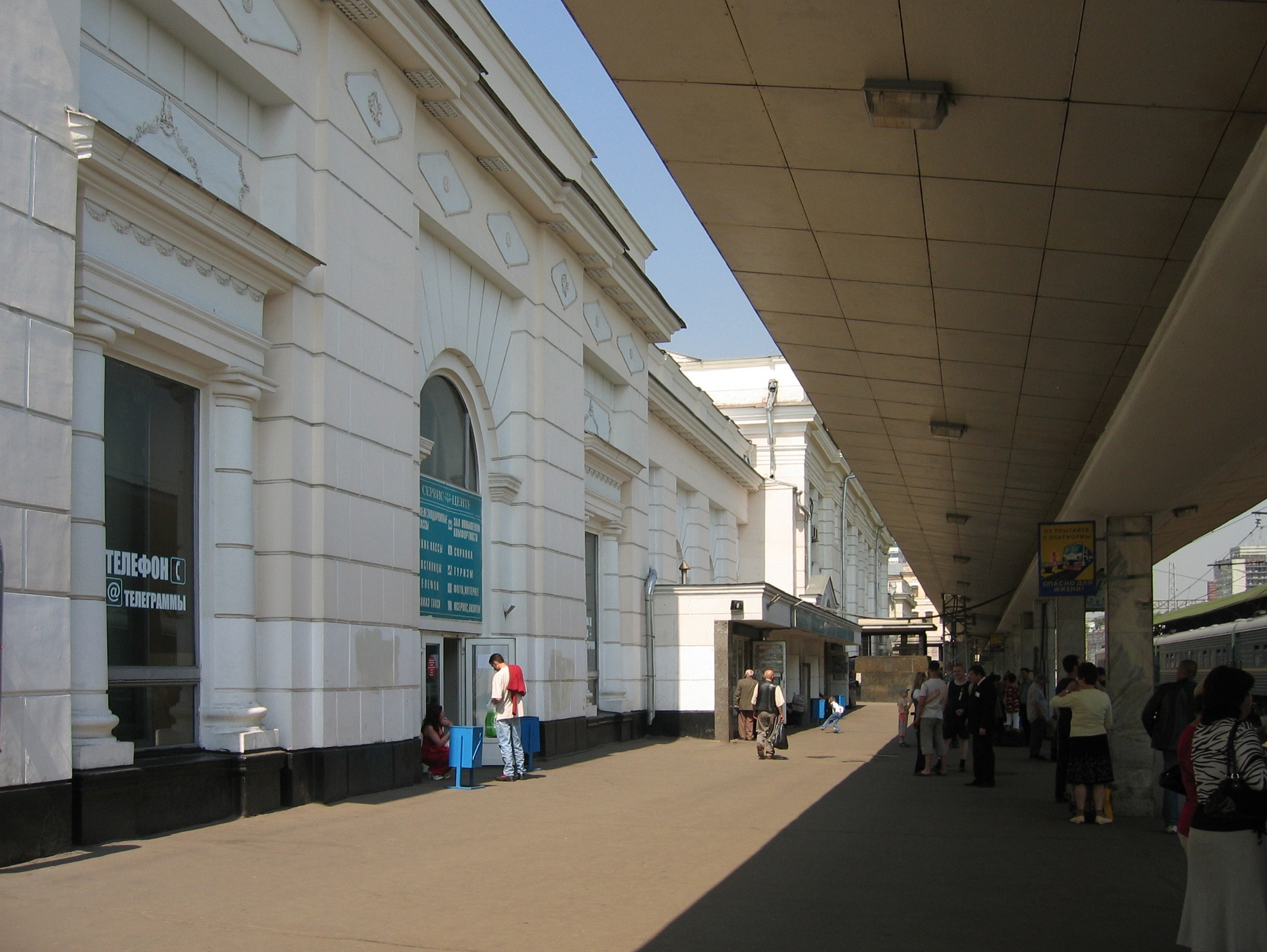
Old building of the station

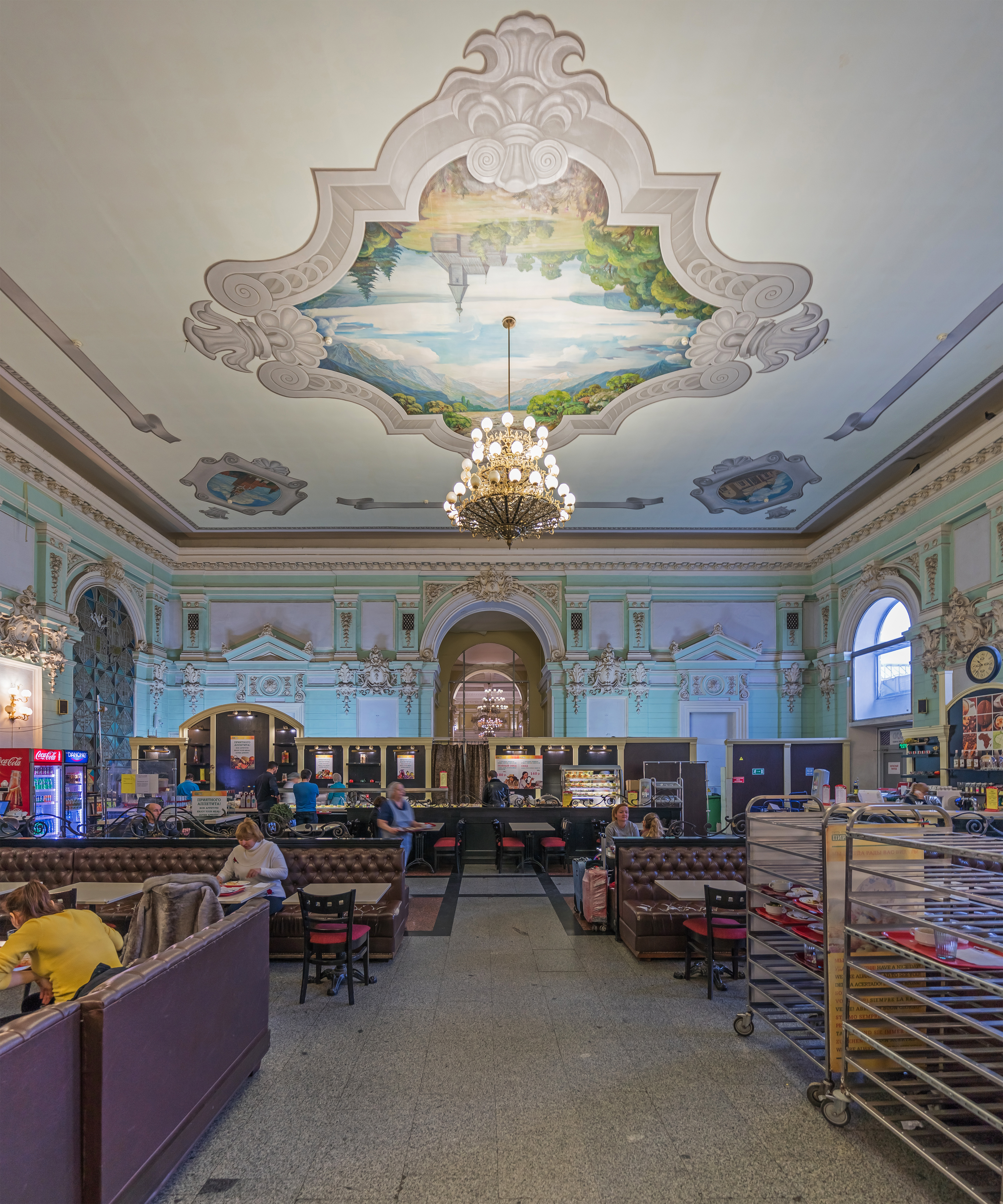
Station restaurant, located in the old building

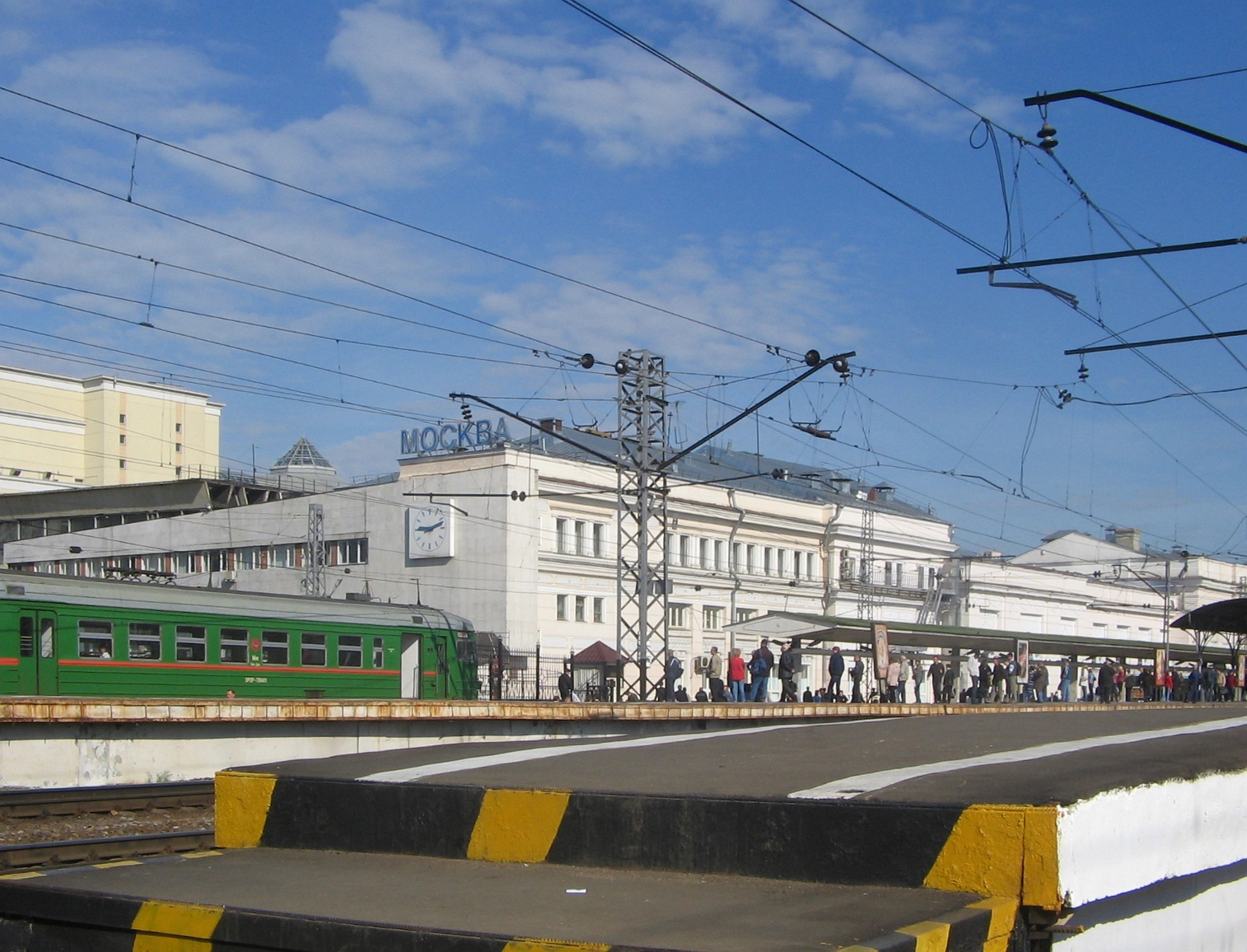
Suburban trains in Kursky station
