= Elektrogorsk railway station =

Railway station in Moscow Oblast, Russia

Elektrogorsk Электрогорск
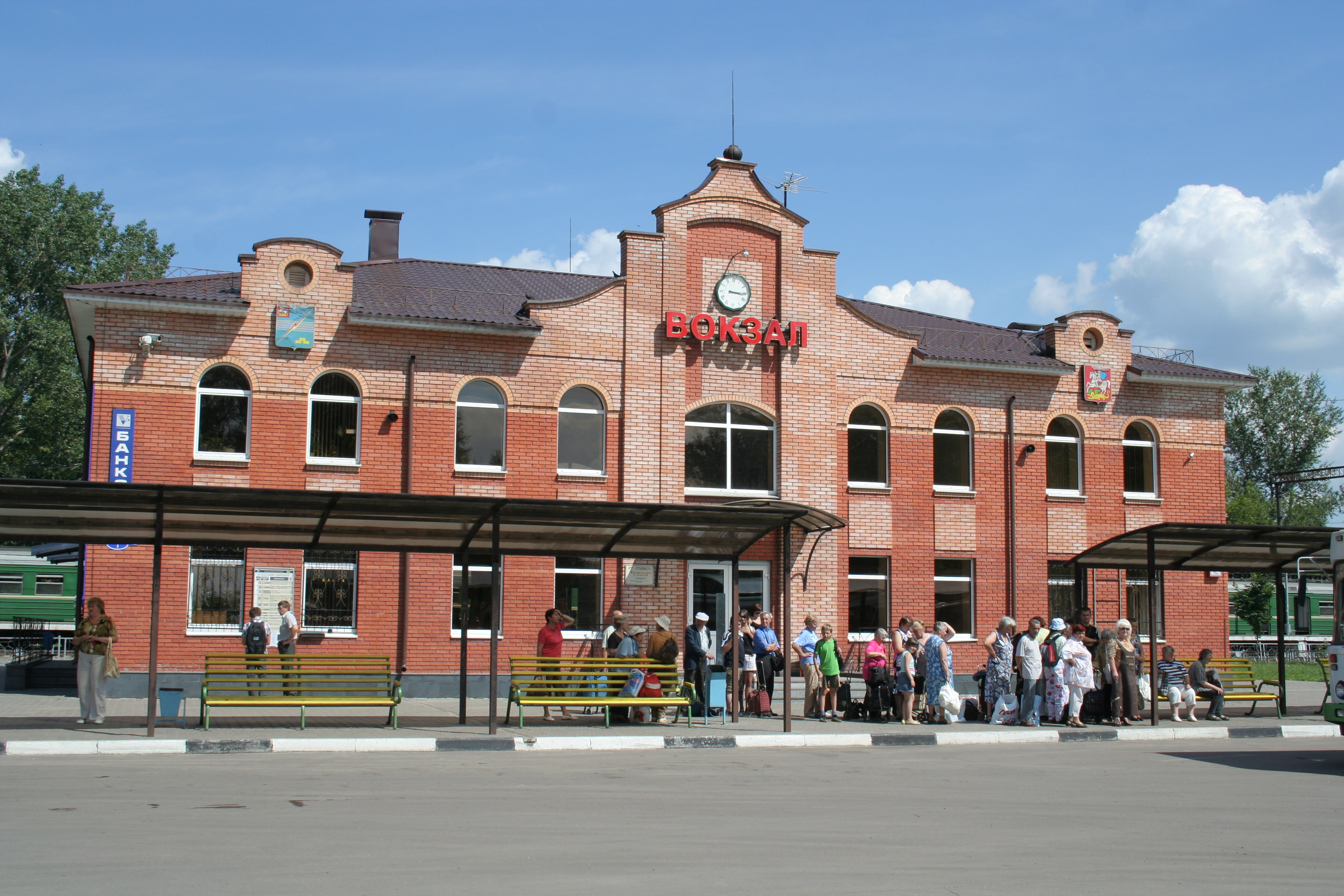

General information
- Location: Elektrogorsk; Moscow Oblast; Russia
- Coordinates: 55°52′57.10″N 38°47′15.35″E
- Owner: Russian Railways
- Operator: Moscow Railway
- Line: Gorkovsky Suburban Line
- Platforms: 1 (island)
- Tracks: 2

Construction
- Structure type: At-grade

Other information
- Station code: 23115
- Fare zone: 9

History
- Opened: May 1, 1925

Services
| Preceding station | Russian Railways | Following station |
|---|---|---|
| 14 km towards Pavlovsky Posad | Gorkovsky Suburban Elektrogorsk Branch | Terminus |
Location

Elektrogosk (Russian: Электрого́рск) is a railway station on Gorkovsky suburban railway line of Moscow Railway. This station is the terminus of Pavlovsky Posad - Elektrogorsk line. The station is located in Elektrogorsk, Moscow Oblast.
