= Line D4 (Moscow Central Diameters) =

Future suburban railway line in Moscow

Kaluzhsko-Nizhegorodsky Diameter

Overview
- Native name: Калужско-Нижегородский диаметр
- Status: Operating
- Owner: Government of Russia
- Locale: Moscow
- Termini: Zheleznodorozhnaya; Aprelevka Novoperedelkino
- Stations: 38

Service
- Type: Commuter rail
- System: Moscow Central Diameters
- Operator: Central Suburban Passenger Company
- Rolling stock: EG2Tv, EP2D, EP2DM

History
- Opened: 9 September 2023

Technical
- Line length: 86 km (53 mi)
- Track gauge: 1,520 mm (4 ft 11 27/32 in) Russian gauge
- Electrification: 3 kV DC

D4 (Russian: МЦД-4) or Kaluzhsko-Nizhegorodsky Diameter (Russian: Калужско-Нижегородский диаметр) (previously known as Kiyevsko-Gorkovsky Diameter (Russian: Киевско-Горьковский диаметр) (Diameter 4; Green Diameter) is the fourth line of the Moscow Central Diameters which opened on 9 September 2023.

== Stations ==
Note: Greyed out stations are either still being built or are otherwise not open.

Station Name		Transfers
English	Russian	Transfers
Zheleznodorozhnaya	Железнодорожная	
Olgino	Ольгино	
Kuchino	Кучино	
Saltykovskaya	Салтыковская	
Nikolskoye	Никольское	
Reutovo	Реутово	Novokosino
Novogireyevo	Новогиреево	
Kuskovo	Кусково	
Chukhlinka	Чухлинка	Perovo
Nizhegorodskaya	Нижегородская	Nizhegorodskaya; Nizhegorodskaya; Nizhegorodskaya
Serp i Molot	Серп и Молот	Moskva-Tovarnaya; Ploshchad Ilyicha; Rimskaya
Kurskaya	Курская	Kurskaya; Kurskaya; Kurskaya; Chkalovskaya
Ploshchad Tryokh Vokzalov	Площадь трёх вокзалов	Ploshchad Tryokh Vokzalov; Komsomolskaya; Komsomolskaya
Rizhskaya	Рижская	Rizhskaya; Rizhskaya; Rizhskaya; Rizhskaya
Maryina Roshcha	Марьина Роща	Maryina Roshcha; Maryina Roshcha; Maryina Roshcha
Stankolit	Станколит	
Savyolovskaya	Савёловская	Savyolovskaya; Savyolovskaya; Savyolovskaya; Savyolovskaya
Belorusskaya	Белорусская	Belorusskaya; Belorusskaya; Belorusskaya
Begovaya	Беговая	Begovaya; Begovaya
Yermakova Roshcha	Ермакова Роща	
Moskva-City	Москва-Сити	Testovskaya (Moskva-City); Moskva-City; Moskva-City
Kutuzovskaya	Кутузовская	Kutuzovskaya; Kutuzovskaya
Park Pobedy	Парк Победы	Park Pobedy
Minskaya	Минская	Minskaya
Matveyevskoye	Матвеевское	
Aminyevskaya	Аминьевская	Aminyevskaya
Ochakovo	Очаково	
Meshchyorskaya	Мещёрская	
Solnechnaya	Солнечная	
Peredelkino	Переделкино	
Michurinets	Мичуринец	
Vnukovo	Внуково	
Lesnoy Gorodok	Лесной Городок	
Tolstopaltsevo	Толстопальцево	
Kokoshkino	Кокошкино	
Sanino	Санино	
Kryokshino	Крёкшино	
Pobeda	Победа	
Aprelevka	Апрелевка	
