= Gorkovsky suburban railway line =

Railway line in Russia

Gorkovsky Suburban Railway

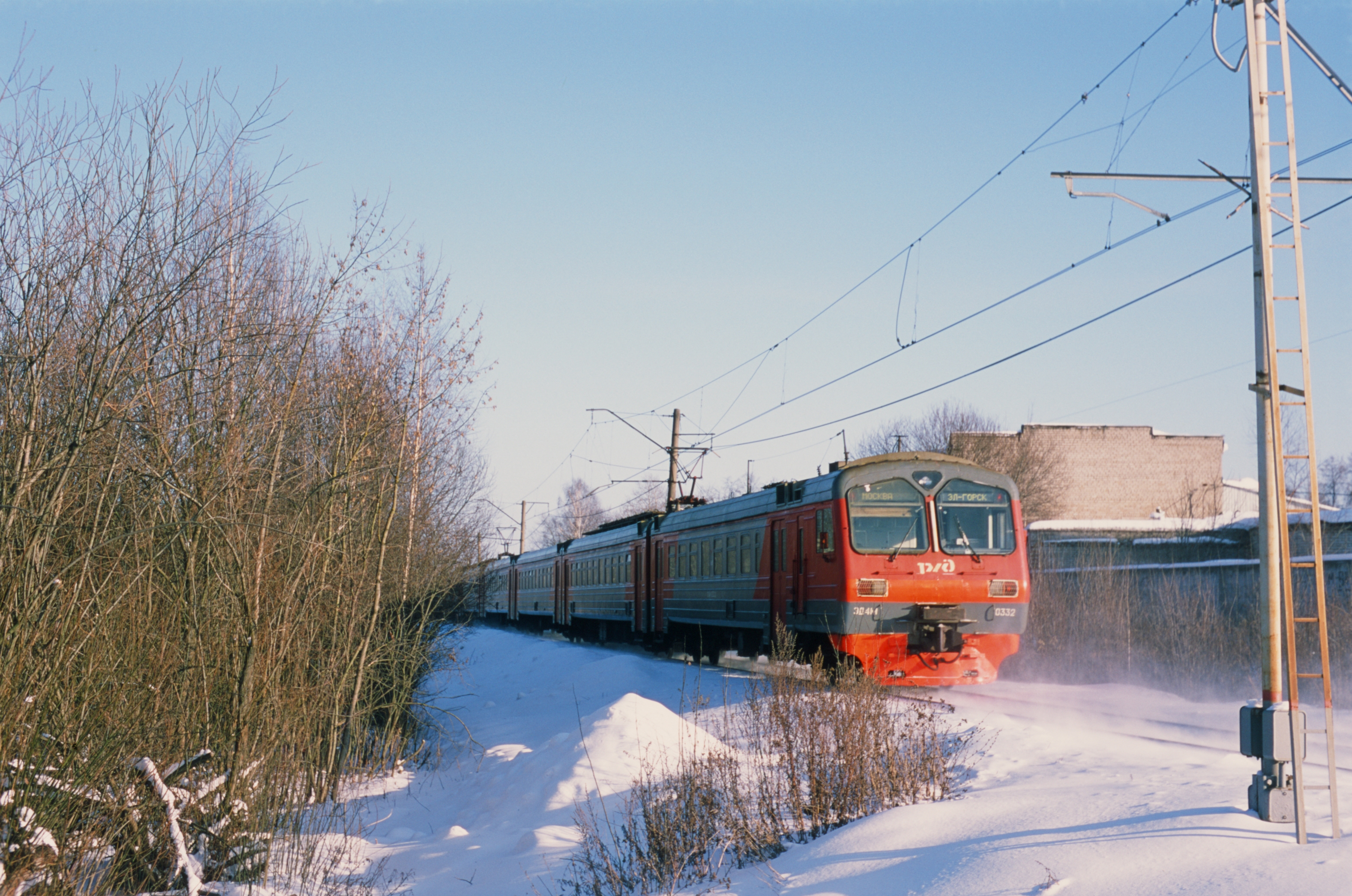

Overview
- Native name: Горьковское направление Московской железной дороги
- Owner: Russian Railways
- Locale: Moscow and Moscow Oblast
- Termini: Moscow Kursky; Vladimir
- Stations: 60 (including branches)

Service
- Type: Commuter rail
- System: Moscow Railway (Moscow–Petushki); Gorky Railway (Petushki–Vladimir)
- Operator(s): Russian Railways

Technical
- Track gauge: 1,520 mm (4 ft 11 27/32 in) Russian gauge
- Electrification: 3 kV DC overhead line
Route map
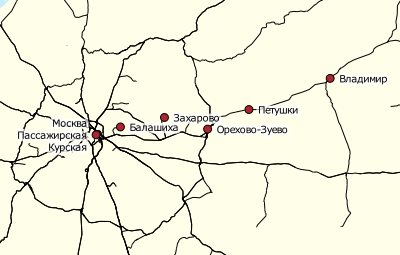

The Gorkovsky suburban railway line or Gorkovskoye line (Russian: Горьковское направление Московской железной дороги) is one of eleven suburban railway lines used for suburban railway connections between Moscow, Russia, and surrounding areas in Moscow Oblast and Vladimir Oblast. The Gorkovsky suburban railway line connects Moscow with the stations in the east, in particular, with the towns of Reutov, Balashikha, Elektrougli, Elektrostal, Noginsk, Pavlovsky Posad, Elektrogorsk, Orekhovo-Zuyevo, Pokrov, Petushki, and Vladimir.

The western terminus of the line is at Kursky railway station in Moscow. Some suburban trains have their western termini at Ploschad Tryokh Vokzalov and Nizhegorodskaya railway stations in Moscow, but the majority of services continue onto Kiyevskoye line. In the eastern direction, the suburban trains terminate at Balashikha, Zheleznodorozhnaya, Kupavna, Fryazevo, Zakharovo, Elektrogorsk, Petushki, and Vladimir. The line is served by Moscow Railway between Moscow and Petushki and by Gorky Railway between Petushki and Vladimir. The suburban railway line follows the railway which connects Moscow with Nizhny Novgorod (formerly Gorky, hence the name) via Vladimir. The line is fully electrified and has four tracks between Moscow Kurskaya and Zheleznodorozhnaya stations and two track on the rest of the route. The distance between Moscow Kurskaya railway station and Vladimir is 190 kilometres (120 mi).

The rails are used, in addition to suburban trains, also by long-distance trains to Moscow from the Urals and Siberia. Some of these trains terminate at Moscow Kursky railway station, and others terminate at Moscow Yaroslavsky railway station, arriving there via Fryazevo and Mytishchi.

== History ==
The construction of the railway between Moscow and Vladimir started in 1858, the stretch was open in 1861 and extended to Nizhny Novgorod in 1862. The terminal station was Nizhegorodsky Railway Station in Moscow, at Rogozhsky Val Street. In 1893, the government bought the railway, and on 1 January 1894 the Moscow-Kursk, Nizhny Novgorod and Murom Railway was created. In 1896, Kursky railway station was opened, and on 14 June 1896 the trains from Nizhny Novgorod started to run to that station. Nizhegorodsky Railway Station was used for cargo traffic, and eventually disused and demolished.

The suburban railway line was electrified in stretches. From 1931 to 1933, the stretch between Moscow and Obiralovka (currently Zheleznodorozhnaya) was electrified; in 1933, Reutovo to Balashikha, in 1957 Zheleznodorozhnaya to Fryazevo and Fryazevo to Noginsk, and in 1958 Fryazevo to Petushki. The part between Petushki and Vladimir was electrified in 1959.

The poem in prose Moscow-Petushki by Venedikt Yerofeyev, written between 1969 and 1970, is set on a suburban train, which travels from Moscow to Petushki. Every chapter is named for a stretch between adjacent stops.

== Stations ==
Following the standard notations in Russia, a railway stop below is called a station if it is a terminus or if it has a cargo terminal, and it is called a platform (railway stop) otherwise.

=== Moscow to Vladimir ===
1. Moscow Kursky railway station, transfer to Kurskaya metro station (Arbatsko–Pokrovskaya line), Kurskaya metro station (Koltsevaya line), Chkalovskaya metro station;
2. Serp i Molot (platform), Ploshchad Ilyicha metro station, Rimskaya metro station;
3. Nizhegorodskaya (platform), Nizhegorodskaya Moscow Central Circle station;
4. Chukhlinka (platform);
5. Kuskovo (station);
6. Novogireyevo (platform);
7. Reutov (station), connection to Balashikha;
8. Nikolskoye (platform);
9. Saltykovskaya (platform);
10. Kuchino (platform);
11. Zheleznodorozhnaya (station). End of the three track line;
12. Chyornoye (platform);
13. Zarya (platform);
14. Kupavna (station);
15. 33 km (platform);
16. Elektrougli (station);
17. 43 km (platform);
18. Khrapunovo (station);
19. Yesino (platform);
20. Fryazevo (station), connections to Yaroslavsky suburban railway line and to Zakharovo;
21. Kazanskoye (platform);
22. Vokhna (platform);
23. Pavlovsky Posad (station), connection to Elektrogorsk;
24. Nazaryevo (platform);
25. Drezna (station);
26. Kabanovo (platform);
27. 87 km (platform);
28. Orekhovo-Zuyevo (station), connection to Greater Ring of the Moscow Railway;
29. Krutoye (platform). Most suburban trains terminates here;
30. Voinovo (platform);
31. Usad (station);
32. Glubokovo (platform);
33. Pokrov (station);
34. 113 km (platform);
35. Omutishche (platform);
36. Leonovo (platform);
37. Petushki (station);
38. Kosteryovo (station);
39. Boldino (station);
40. Sushnevo (platform);
41. Undol (station);
42. 170 km (platform);
43. Koloksha (station);
44. Yuryevets (station);
45. Vladimir (station).

=== Reutovo to Balashikha ===
Single-track electrified branch. Trains go directly from Moscow.

1. Reutovo (station);
2. Stroyka (platform);
3. Gorenki (platform);
4. Balashikha (station).

=== Fryazevo to Zakharovo ===
Single-track electrified branch. Trains go directly from Moscow.

1. Fryazevo (station);
2. Metallurg (platform);
3. Elektrostal (station);
4. Mashinostroitel (platform);
5. Noginsk (station);
6. Zakharovo (station).

=== Pavlovsky Posad to Elektrogorsk ===
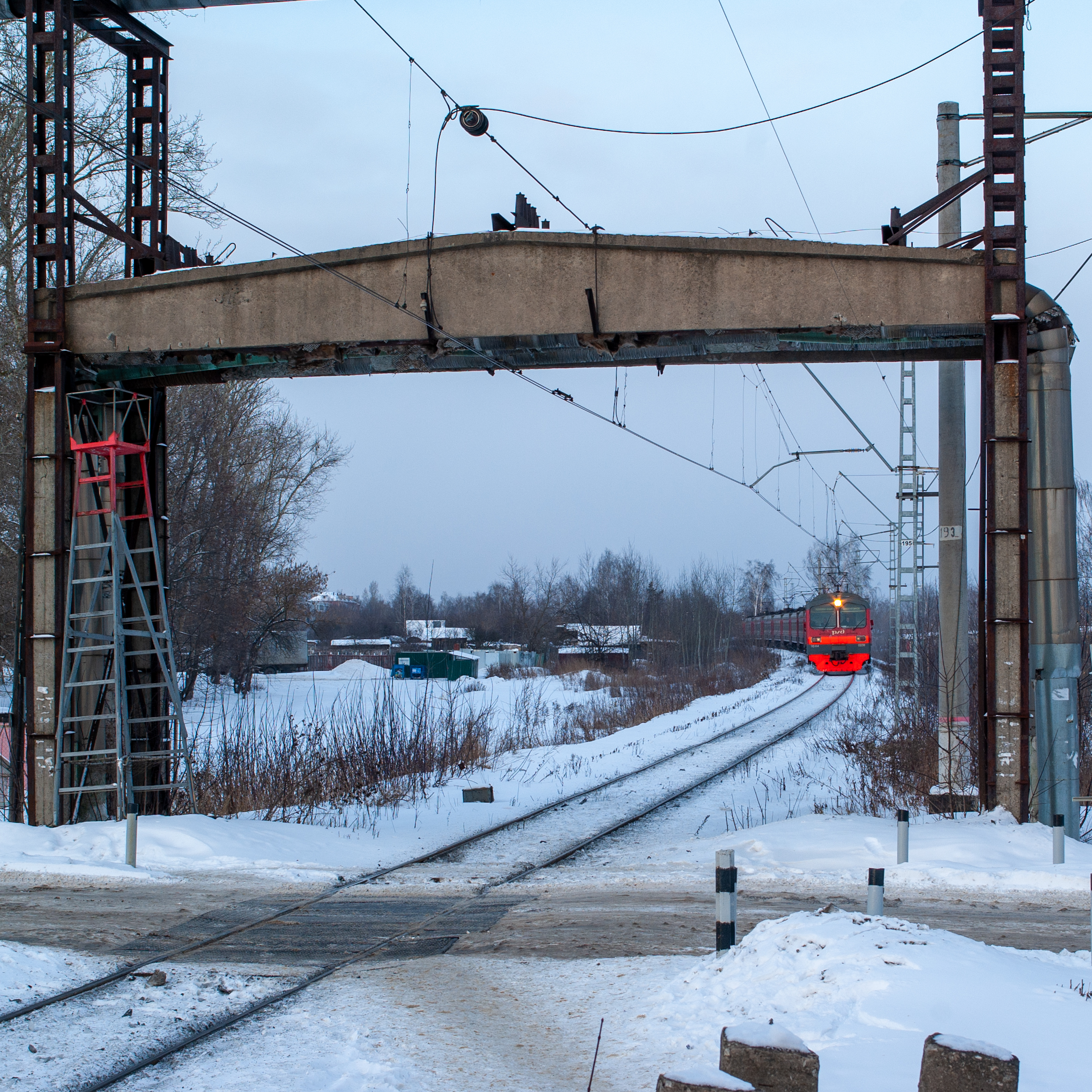
Single-track Elektrogorsk branch line

Single-track electrified branch. Trains go directly from Moscow.

1. Pavlovsky Posad (station);
2. Lenskaya (platform);
3. Kovrigino (platform);
4. 14 km (platform);
5. Elektrogorsk (station).
