= Zheleznodorozhny, Moscow Oblast =

Former area in Moscow Oblast, Russia

Zheleznodorozhny Железнодорожный
- City
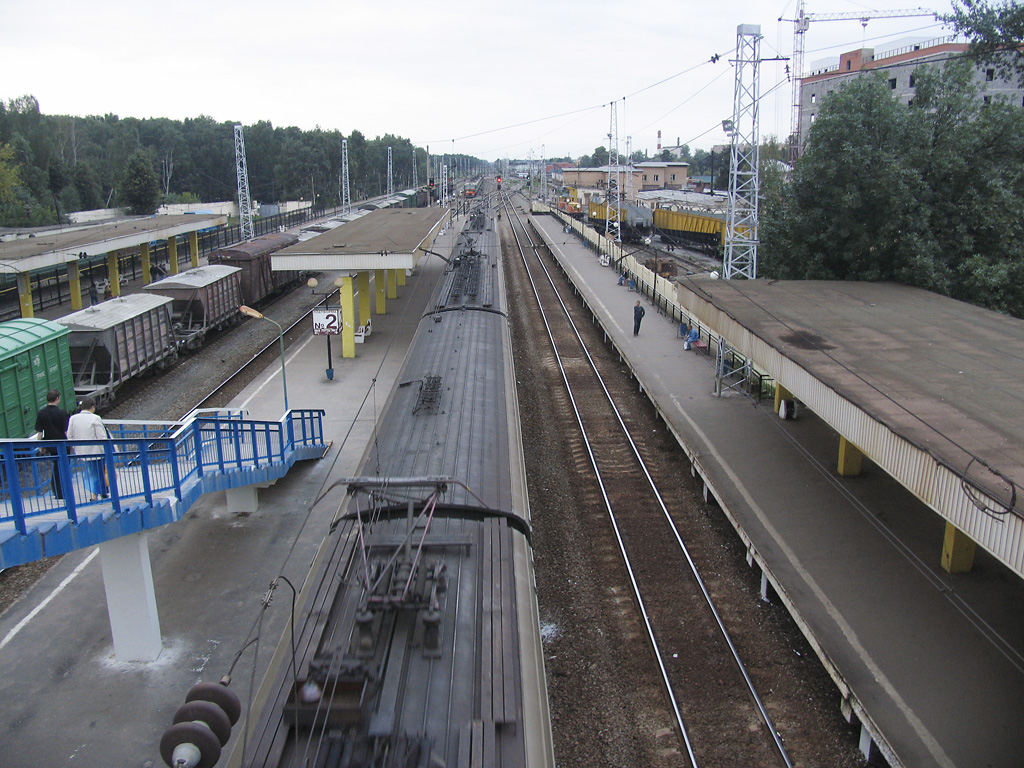
- Zheleznodorozhnaya railway station

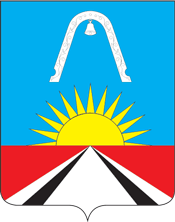
- Flag Coat of arms
- Interactive map of Zheleznodorozhny
- Location of Zheleznodorozhny Zheleznodorozhny (Moscow Oblast)
- Coordinates: 55°45′N 38°01′E
- Country: Russia
- Federal subject: Moscow Oblast
- Founded: 1861
- City status since: 1952

Government
  - Body: City Council
  - Mayor: Yevgeny Zhirkov
- Elevation: 145 m (476 ft)

Population (2010 Census)
  - Total: 131,257
  - Estimate (2015): 151,985 (+15.8%)
  - Rank: 126th in 2010

Administrative status
  - Subordinated to: Zheleznodorozhny City Under Oblast Jurisdiction
  - Capital of: Zheleznodorozhny City Under Oblast Jurisdiction

Municipal status
  - Urban okrug: Zheleznodorozhny Urban Okrug
  - Capital of: Zheleznodorozhny Urban Okrug
- Postal code: 143980

Zheleznodorozhny (Russian: Железнодоро́жный) is an inhabited zone and city in Moscow Oblast, Russia, located 21 kilometers (13 mi) east of Moscow. It was technically abolished and merged into the city of Balashikha in January 2015. Population: 131,257 (2010 census); 103,931 (2002 census); 97,426 (1989 Soviet census). Its name means "Railway", and its flag and coat of arms both had lines resembling railway tracks.

== History ==
Founded in 1861 to service the railway station of Obiralovka (Обира́ловка), the settlement became famous as the location where the main character of Leo Tolstoy's 1878 novel Anna Karenina committed suicide. It was renamed Zheleznodorozhny (Russian adjective meaning "railway"; example of use: "zheleznodorozhnaya stantsiya" "railway station") in 1939 and granted town status in 1952. In the 1960s the settlements of Kuchino (Ку́чино), Savvino (Са́ввино), Temnikovo (Те́мниково), and Sergeyevka (Серге́евка) became part of Zheleznodorozhny.

In January 2015 Zheleznodorozhny was abolished and its territory merged into the city of Balashikha.

== Administrative and municipal status ==
Within the framework of administrative divisions, it was incorporated as Zheleznodorozhny City Under Oblast Jurisdiction—an administrative unit with the status equal to that of the districts. As a municipal division, Zheleznodorozhny City Under Oblast Jurisdiction was incorporated as Zheleznodorozhny Urban Okrug.

== Transportation ==
The railway connecting Moscow and Vladimir runs through Zheleznodorozhny, which is served by Kuchino and Zheleznodorozhnaya railway stations of the Gorkovsky suburban railway line.

== Military unit 35533 ==
In 2013 according to the Virginia-based Taia Global, military unit 35533, (Note: (Russian: военная часть 35533)) which is a research institute owned by the FSB, uses the postal code for Zheleznodorozhny. Taia Global asserted that Military unit 35533 (Note: (Russian: в/ч 35533)) is the "FSB Scientific Research Unit No. 1", (Note: (Russian: «Научно-исследовательская часть ФСБ № 1»)) which is part of the Third Scientific and Technical Directorate of the FSB (Note: (Russian: Третье научно-техническое управление ФСБ)) and, in 2013, military unit 35533, which was headed by Major General Alexei Reznev, (Note: (Russian: Генерал-майор Алексей Резнев)) specialized in research in the field of information technology, hardware and software development. Since 2010 according to Taia Global, military unit 35533's interests have included digital signal processing systems, wireless network equipment research, and text encryption research and supports research into "anthropomorphic methods of speech analysis and processing," (Note: (Russian: «антропоморфные методы анализа и обработки речи»)) as well as "methods for automatic voice recognition" (Note: (Russian: «методы автоматического распознавания голоса»)) and "methods for changing and imitating the voice of a given individual." (Note: (Russian: «методы изменения и имитации голоса заданного человека»)). Allegedly, these electronics can be used both to create eavesdropping technologies and to falsify communications for Russian intelligence services. (Note: In October 2012, the FBI raided Arc Electronics Inc., which is a Houston, Texas-based company owned by the USSR-born emigrant Alexander Fishenko, and, later, arrested Fishenko and seven others and implicated Fishenko's Moscow-based company, Apex Systems, in the case, as well. The United States Department of Justice alleged that, in late 2011, several of the defendants destroyed documents and deleted emails that dealt with the Russian military. Allegedly, Fishenko stole military microelectronic technology to support Russian espionage. Fishenko claimed that his company shipped items such as traffic light parts to Russia. The FBI indictment stated that, in addition to illegally exporting electronics, Fishenko and 10 accomplices in the United States and Russia engaged in money laundering and acted in the United States as an "unregistered agent" of the Russian government. The United States investigation alleged that, since October 2008, Fishenko and his accomplices had "engaged in a surreptitious and systematic conspiracy" to export to Russia numerous highly regulated technologies from United States manufacturers. During this investigation into the illegal sale of electronic components to Russia, the United States Department of Commerce imposed sanctions in December 2012 against 119 Russian individuals and entities and 46 of their foreign partners involved in the illegal electronics supply scheme. In September 2015, Fishenko pled guilty as a Russian agent who led a scheme to illegally export controlled technology to the Russian military. (Note: According to the Center for Development of Security Excellence, Alexander Fishenko, (Note: Alexander Fishenko (Russian: Александр Фишенко; born 1966 or 1967, Soviet Kazakhstan) graduated from the Leningrad Electro-Technical Institute in St. Petersburg, Russia, and, in 1994, immigrated to the United States becoming a naturalized citizen of the United States in 2003. Fishenko held both a United States and a Russian passport. He was a co-owner (Note: Alexandr Fishenko's wife Viktoria was a co-owner of the Houston, Texas-based ARC Electronics Inc. (ARC).) and President of the Houston, Texas-based ARC Electronics Inc. (ARC) and the part owner and Marketing Manager of the Moscow-based APEX SYSTEM, L.L.C. (APEX).) who allegedly was working illegally as a Russian government agent, was the co-owner and President of the Texas-based ARC Electronics (ARC), and, between 2002 and 2012, while using ARC as a front, shipped approximately $50,000,000 worth of microelectronics and other technologies from the United States to certified suppliers of military equipment to the Russian Ministry of Defense.))

== Notable people ==
- Vasily Arkhipov, Soviet navy officer who prevented a potential escalation of the Cuban Missile Crisis into World War III, lived in the city until his death in 1998.

Andrei Bely, writer

- Alexandra Snezhko-Blotskaya, animated films director, lived there until her death in 1980.
