= Staraya Kupavna =

Town in Moscow Oblast, Russia

Staraya Kupavna Старая Купавна
- Town
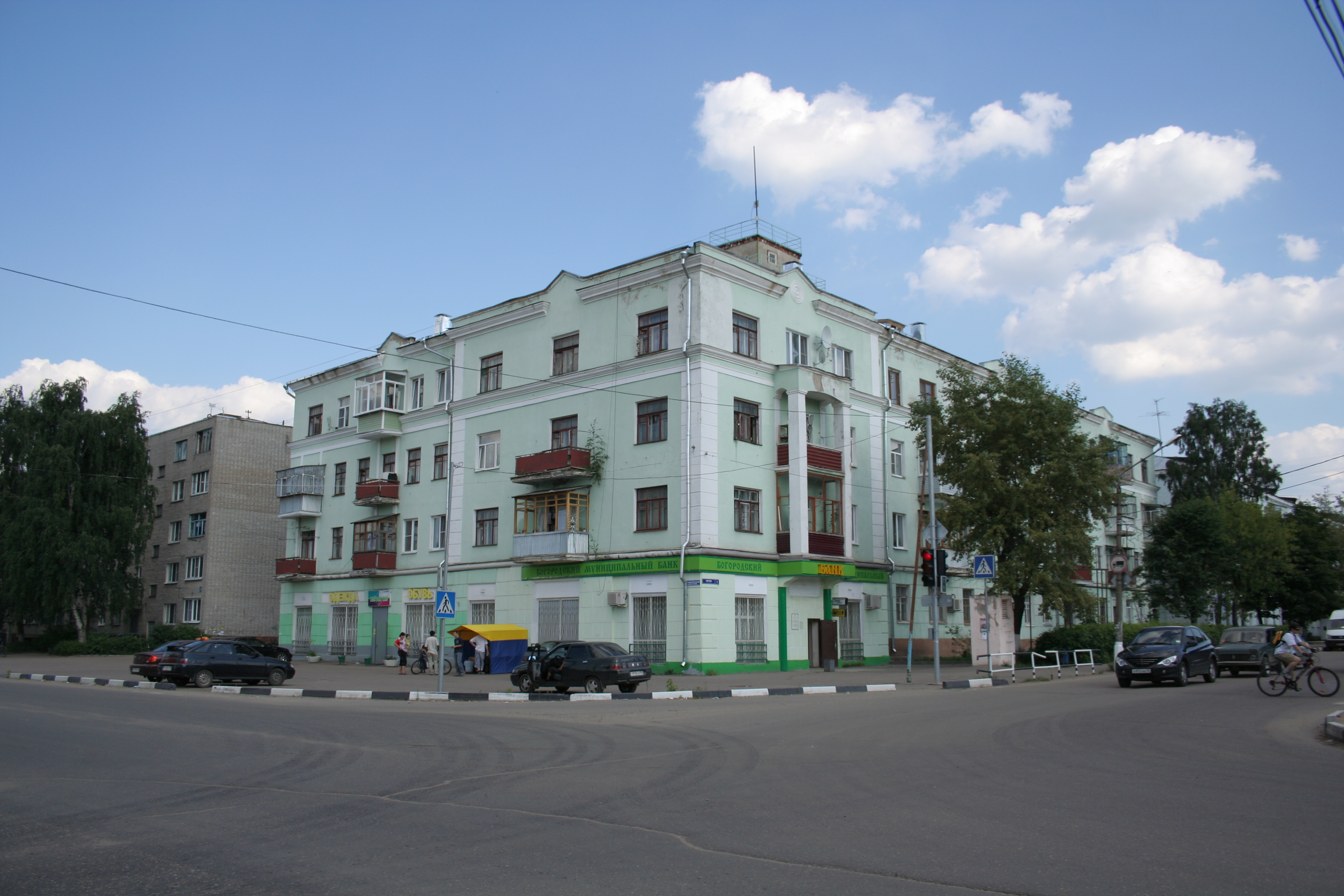
- A residential district in Staraya Kupavna

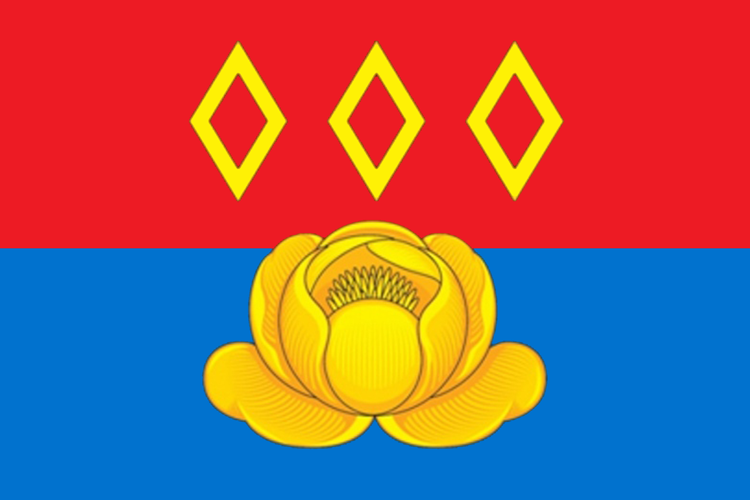
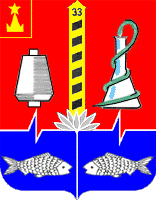
- Flag Coat of arms
- Interactive map of Staraya Kupavna
- Location of Staraya Kupavna Staraya Kupavna (Moscow Oblast)
- Coordinates: 55°48′N 38°10′E
- Country: Russia
- Federal subject: Moscow Oblast
- Administrative district: Noginsky District
- TownSelsoviet: Staraya Kupavna
- First mentioned: 14th century
- Town status since: 2004
- Elevation: 140 m (460 ft)

Population (2010 Census)
  - Total: 21,811
  - Estimate (2025): 23,944 (+9.8%)

Administrative status
  - Capital of: Town of Staraya Kupavna

Municipal status
  - Municipal district: Noginsky Municipal District
  - Urban settlement: Staraya Kupavna Urban Settlement
  - Capital of: Staraya Kupavna Urban Settlement
- Time zone: UTC+3 (MSK)
- Postal code: 142450
- Dialing code: +7 49651
- OKTMO ID: 46751000006
- Website: stkupavna.munrus.ru

Staraya Kupavna (Russian: Ста́рая Купа́вна, Old Kupavna) is a town in Noginsky District of Moscow Oblast, Russia, located on the left bank of the Shalovka River (Klyazma's tributary) 23 kilometers (14 mi) east of Moscow. Population: 22,898 (2021 census); 21,811 (2010 census); 21,433 (2002 census); 25,052 (1989 Soviet census)..

== History ==
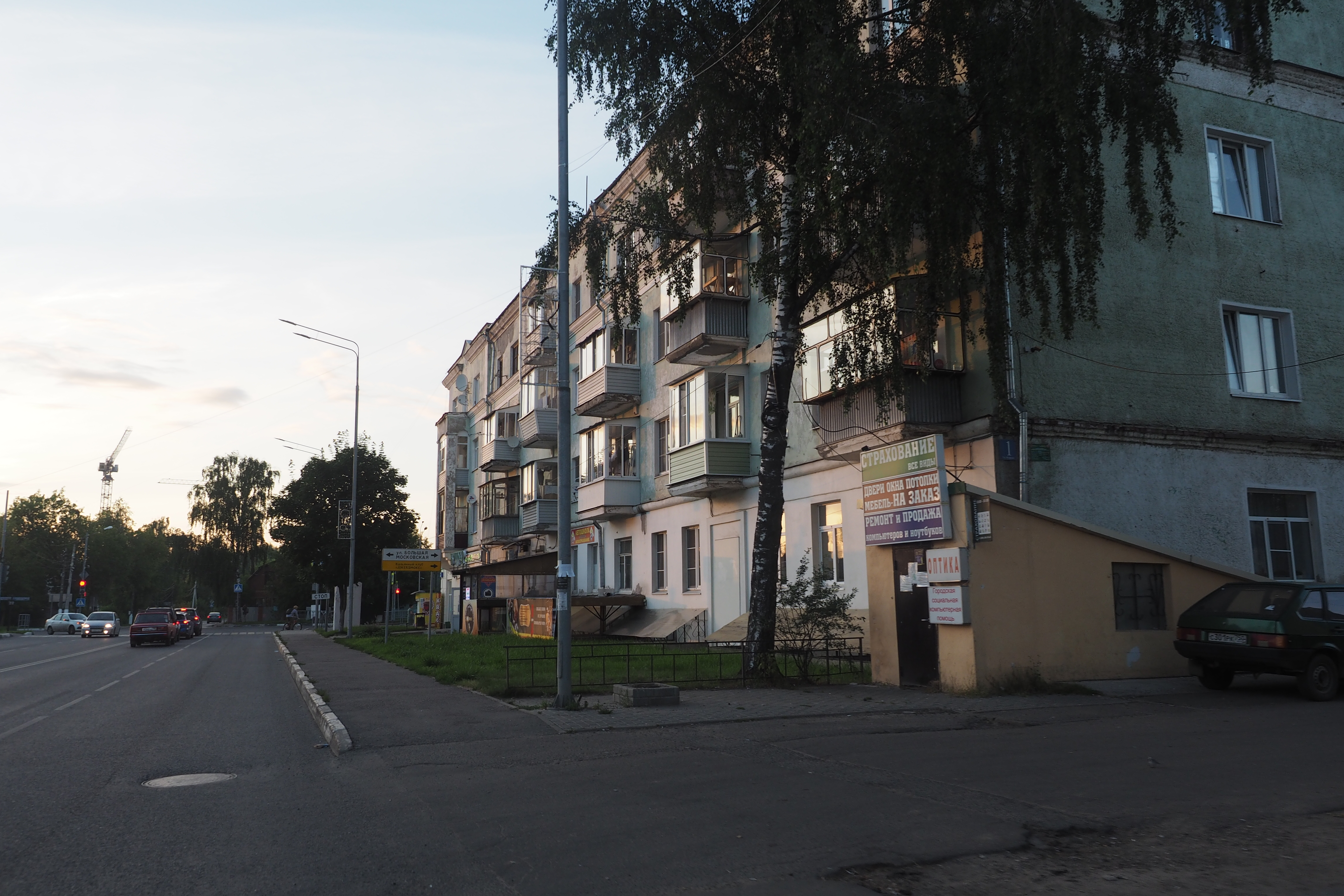
Main street in Staraya Kupavna (2020)

It was first mentioned on 1348 named "New village on Kupavna" following the name of one of the numerous tributaries of Klyazma flown nearby. Starting from 17th century it had a name of "Village of Demidov" as one as "Kupavna". Starting from mid-19th century it changed a name to current one. It was granted town status in 2004.

== Administrative and municipal status ==
Within the framework of administrative divisions, it is, together with five rural localities, incorporated within Noginsky District as the Town of Staraya Kupavna. As a municipal division, the Town of Staraya Kupavna is incorporated within Noginsky Municipal District as Staraya Kupavna Urban Settlement.

== Economy ==
Over thirty companies are operating in the industrial area of the town, including: OJSC Pharmaceutical plant "Akrikhin", CJSC "Base #1 Chimreaktivov", CJSC "Textile firma Kupavna", OJSC "Zhelezobeton, OJSC "Moskhim", OJSC "Lakra Sintez", OJSC "Biserovsky kombinat etc.

=== Transportation ===
Kupavna railway station is located on the Moscow–Nizhny Novgorod line 9 kilometers (5.6 mi) from the town. Local buses link the town with Moscow, Noginsk, and Monino.

== Politics ==
On November 23, 2009, the former mayor of Staraya Kupavna, Anatoly Pleshan, was convicted of taking a bribe for assisting a developer with getting an approval from the residents for construction of a high-rise condo and sentenced to seven years in prison.

== Culture and media ==
There is a cultural center "Akrikhin", named after local pharmaceutical producer Akrikhin.

Weekly newspaper Staraya Kupavna was first published in 1998. Since 2004, Alternativnaya gazeta newspaper has been published, with over 10,000 copies in 2004–2006. In 2008, Molodaya Kupavna newspaper was first issued and TV channel Staraya Kupavna started broadcasting.

== Religion ==
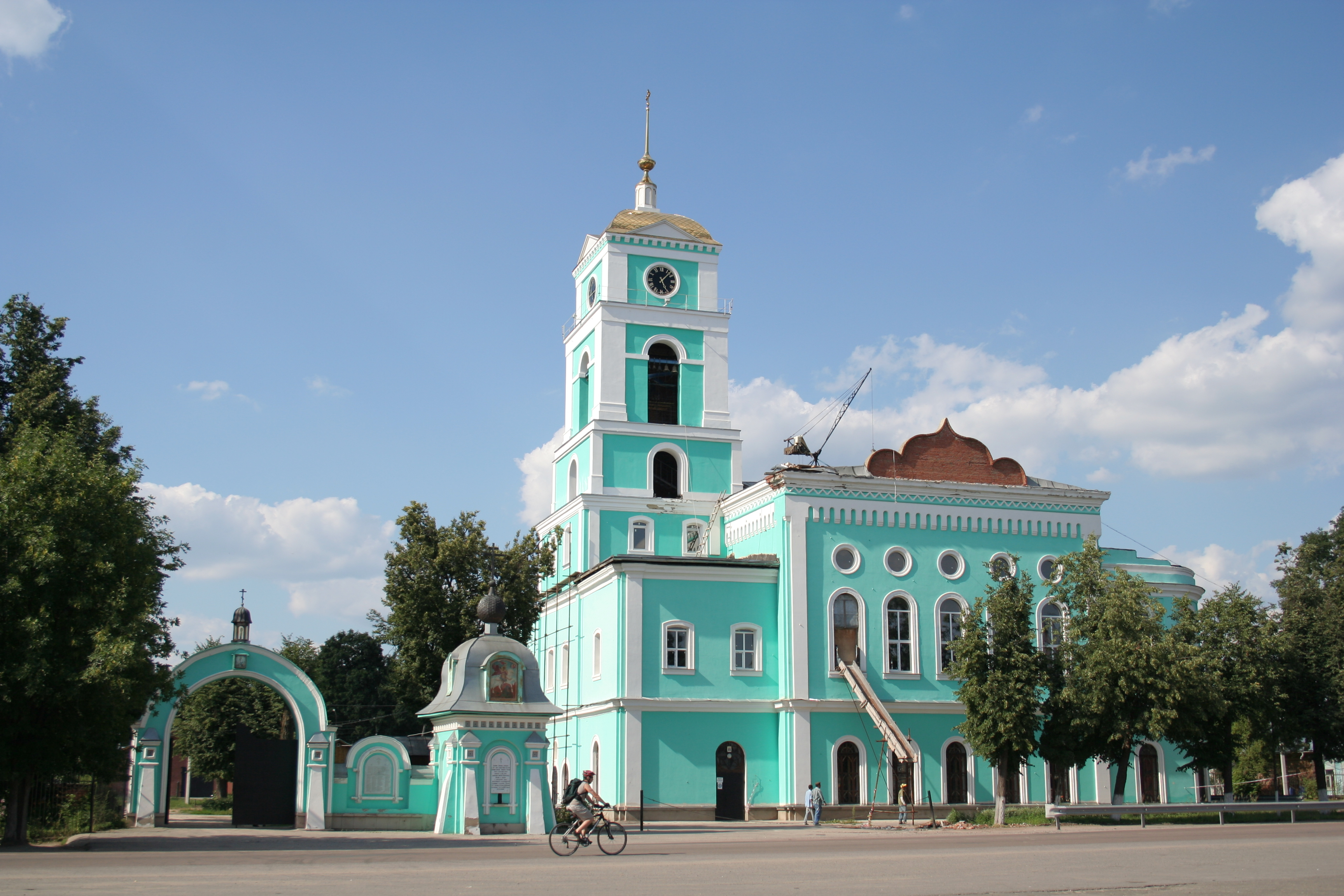
Holy Trinity Church in Staraya Kupavna

The Holy Trinity Russian Orthodox church built in 1751 has recently been reopened after being closed in Soviet times.
