= Elektrogorsk =

Town in Moscow Oblast, Russia

Elektrogorsk Электрогорск
- Town
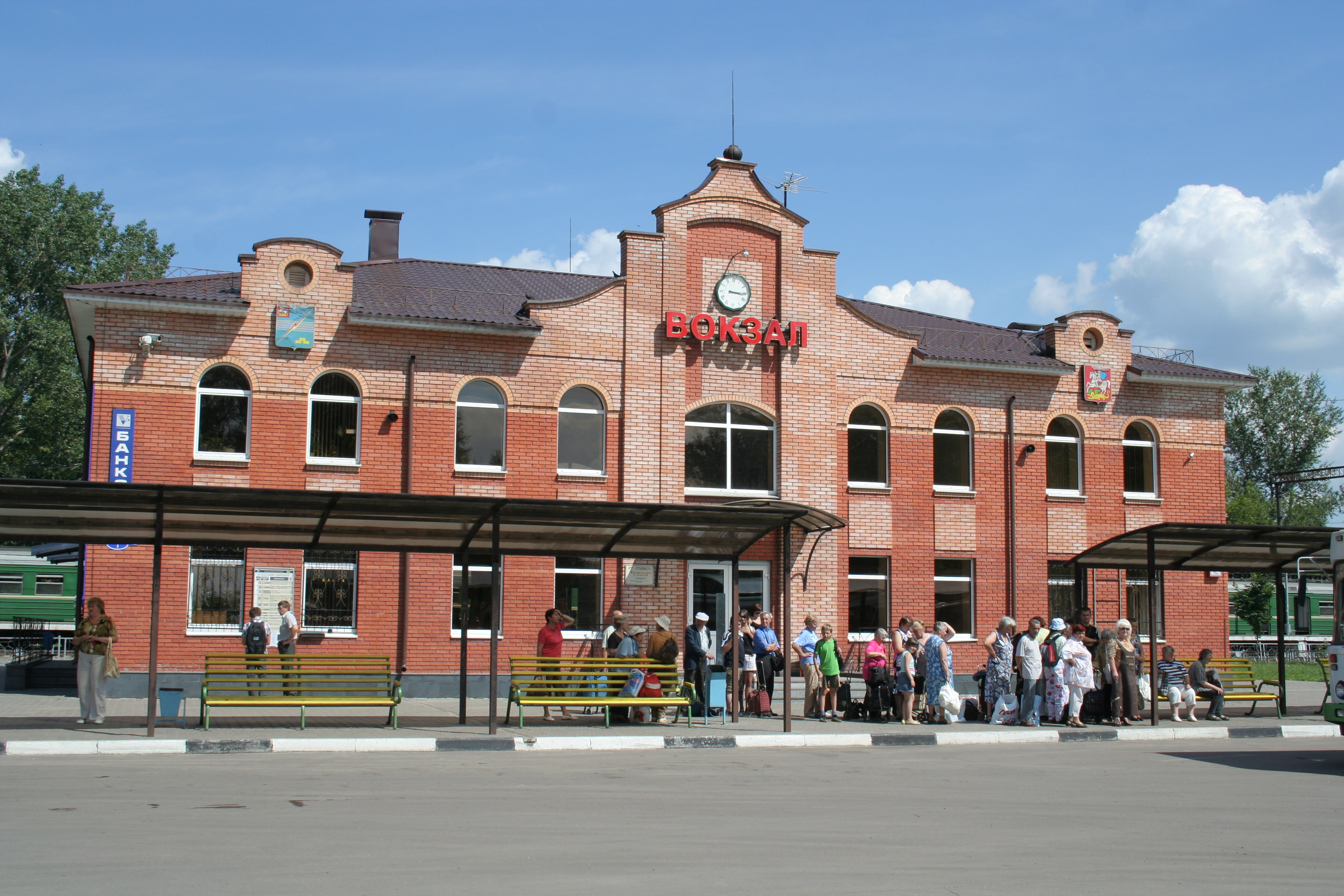
- Elektrogorsk Train Station in Elektrogorsk

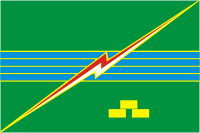
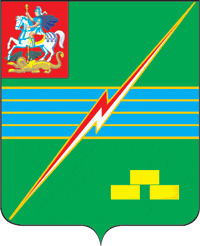
- Flag Coat of arms
- Interactive map of Elektrogorsk
- Location of Elektrogorsk Elektrogorsk (Moscow Oblast)
- Coordinates: 55°53′N 38°48′E
- Country: Russia
- Federal subject: Moscow Oblast
- Founded: 1912
- Town status since: 1946
- Elevation: 133 m (436 ft)

Population
  - Estimate (2020): 22,653 )

Administrative status
  - Subordinated to: Elektrogorsk Town Under Oblast Jurisdiction
  - Capital of: Elektrogorsk Town Under Oblast Jurisdiction

Municipal status
  - Urban okrug: Elektrogorsk Urban Okrug
  - Capital of: Elektrogorsk Urban Okrug
- Time zone: UTC+3 (MSK)
- Postal code: 142530
- OKTMO ID: 46759000006

Elektrogorsk (Russian: Электрого́рск) is a town in Moscow Oblast, Russia, located 75 kilometers (47 mi) east from Moscow. Population: 20,353 (2002 census); 18,391 (1989 Soviet census).

== History ==
Elektrogorsk was founded in 1912 due to the construction of the first big peat-fired thermal power station in Russia, which would be called Elektroperedacha ("Электропередача", lit. "electric power transmission"). The settlement was named after the power station. In 1946, it was granted town status and renamed Elektrogorsk. It has a highly variable climate ranging from −30 °C (−22 °F) in the winter up to 25 °C (77 °F) in the summer.

== Administrative and municipal status ==
Within the administrative divisions framework, it is incorporated as Elektrogorsk Town Under Oblast Jurisdiction—an administrative unit with the status equal to that of the districts. As a municipal division, Elektrogorsk Town Under Oblast Jurisdiction is incorporated as Elektrogorsk Urban Okrug.

== Notable people ==
- Aleksandr Boloshev (1947–2010), basketball player
- Alexey Chesmin (born 1986), paralympic footballer
