= Zheleznodorozhnaya railway station =

Railway station in Moscow Oblast, Russia

Zheleznodorozhnaya Железнодорожная
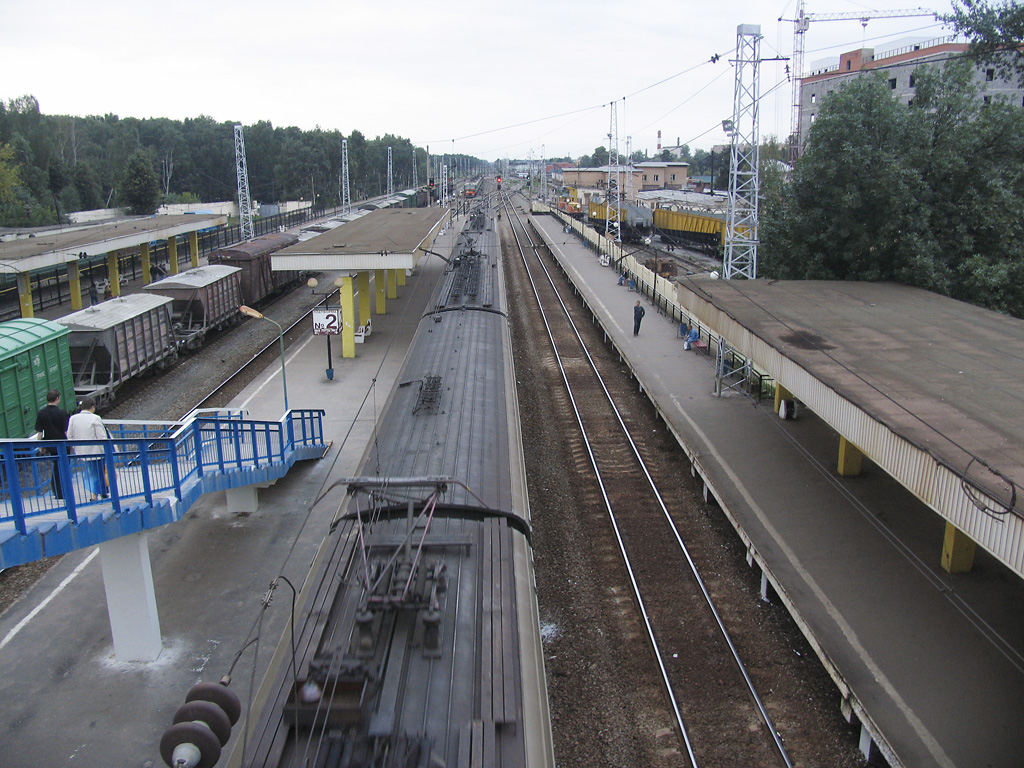

General information
- Location: Zheleznodorozhny, Balashikha; Moscow Oblast; Russia
- Coordinates: 55.7521°N 38.0123°E
- System: Moscow Railway station
- Owner: Russian Railways
- Operator: Moscow Railway
- Platforms: 4 (1 close)
- Tracks: 8

Construction
- Parking: No
- Cycle facilities: Yes
- Accessible: No

Other information
- Station code: 25040
- Fare zone: 3

History
- Opened: 1861
- Rebuilt: 2023
- Former names: Obiralovka

Services
Preceding station	Russian Railways	Following station
Olgino towards Moscow Kursky	Gorkovsky Suburban	Chyornoye towards Vladimir
Location

Zheleznodorozhnaya (Russian: Железнодоро́жная, IPA: [ˈʐɛlʲɛznodoroʐnaja]) is a railway station of the Gorkovsky direction of the Moscow Railway of the Russian Railways. The station is located in Zheleznodorozhny microdistrict (former Zheleznodorozhny city) of Balashikha, Moscow region, Russia.

== History ==
Zheleznodorozhnaya station was founded in 1861 and was originally named Obiralovka. The station was renamed In 1939 due to a petition by local villagers.

== Description ==
The station has station building with turnstiles and cash desks.

Zheleznodorozhnaya has four high platforms — 4 island but now 1 platform close for rebuilding . Two bridges place over platforms: one bridge connect all platforms between each other, another bridge connects two parts of city over railway tracks (without exiting to platforms).

The station has several industrial spurs, going from western side of the station.

In 2023 will include to the D4 of the Moscow Central Diameters as a terminal station of Gorkovsky radius.

== Depot ==
The station has motive power depot "Zheleznodorozhnaya".

== Traffic ==
=== Suburban ===
Zheleznodorozhnaya is a stop station for all suburban trains which going through the station.

For some suburban trains (including expresses Moscow — Zheleznodorozhnaya called the "Sputnik") the station is terminal.

=== Inter-city ===
All Lastochkas Moscow-Nizhny Novgorod stops on the station.

Other inter-city trains goes through the station without stopping.

== In culture ==
The station then called Obiralovka mentioned as a place of suicide of Anna Karenina in eponymous novel of L. Tolstoy.

The station was mentioned in Moscow-Petushki prose poem of Venedikt Yerofeyev.

== Gallery ==
Zheleznodorozhnaya

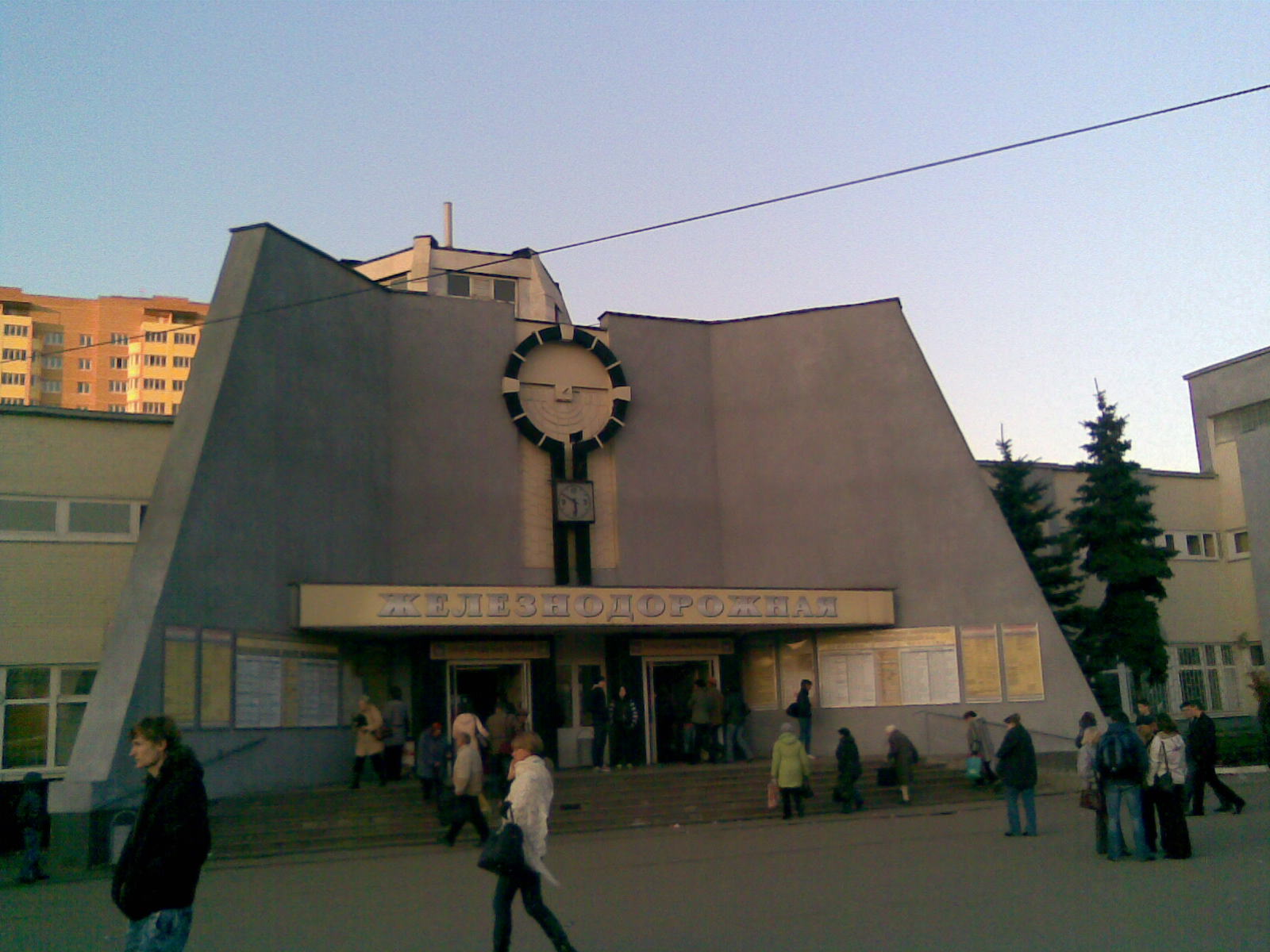
Station building
2009

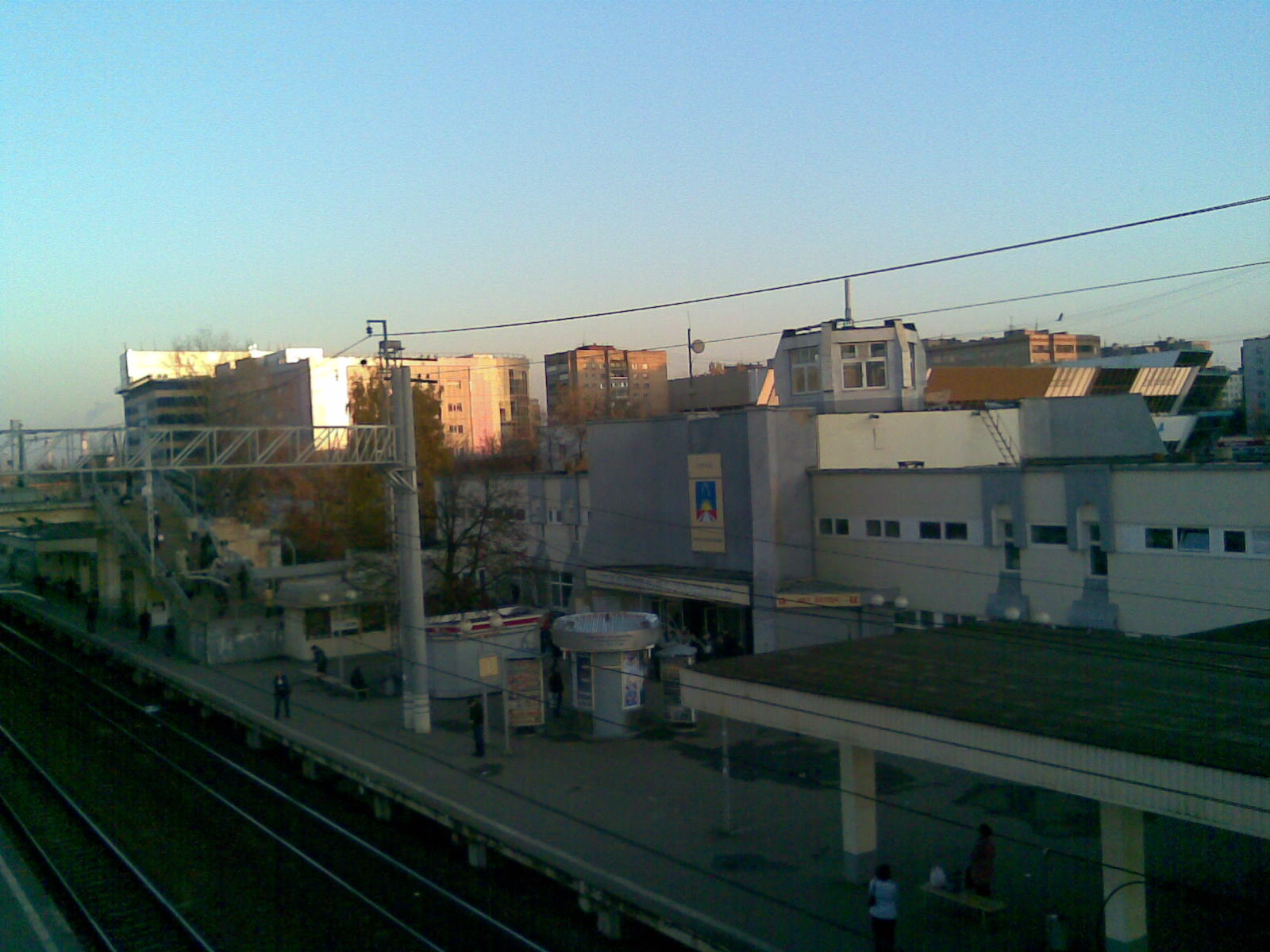
First platform
2009

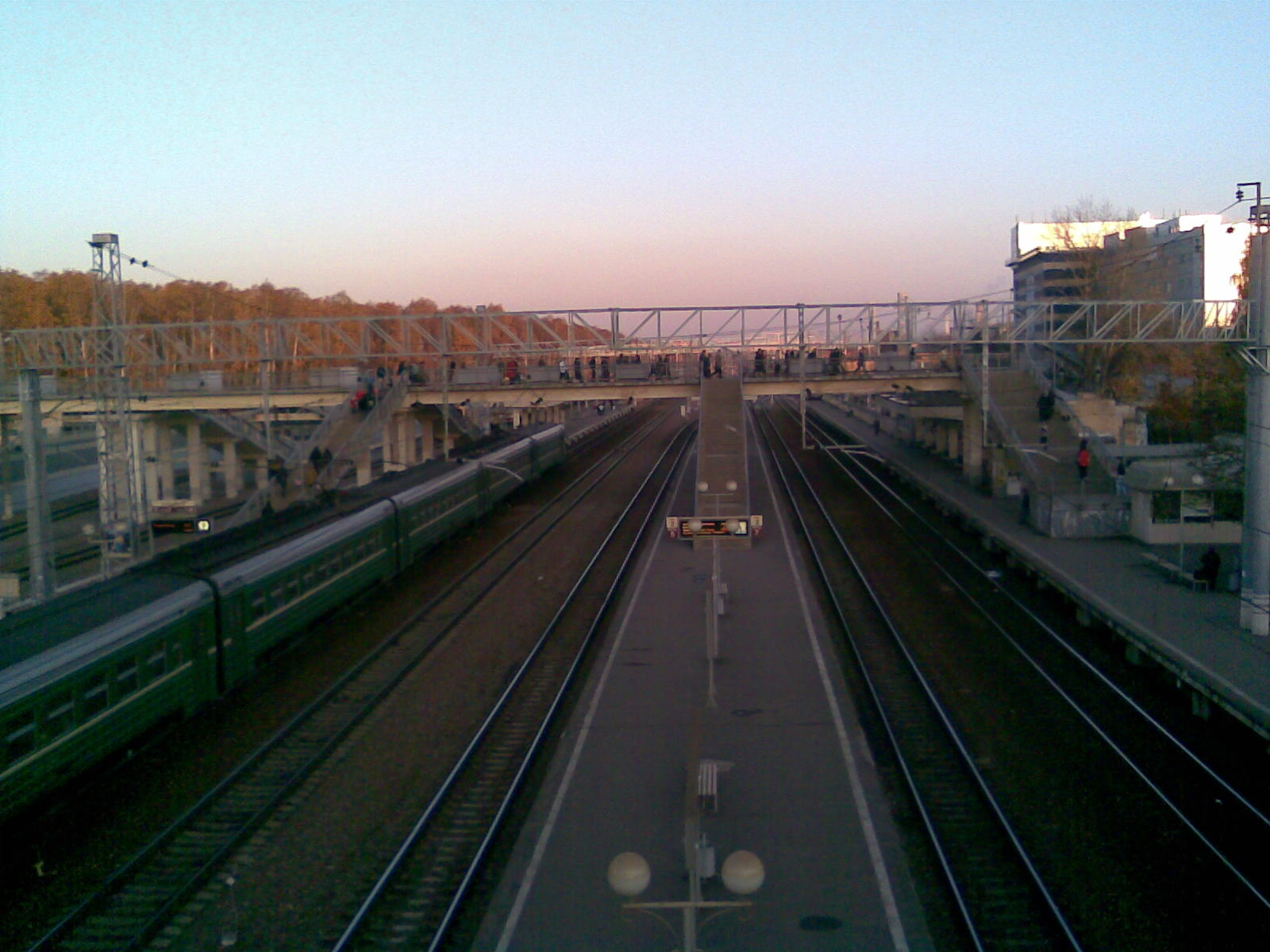
Second platform
2009

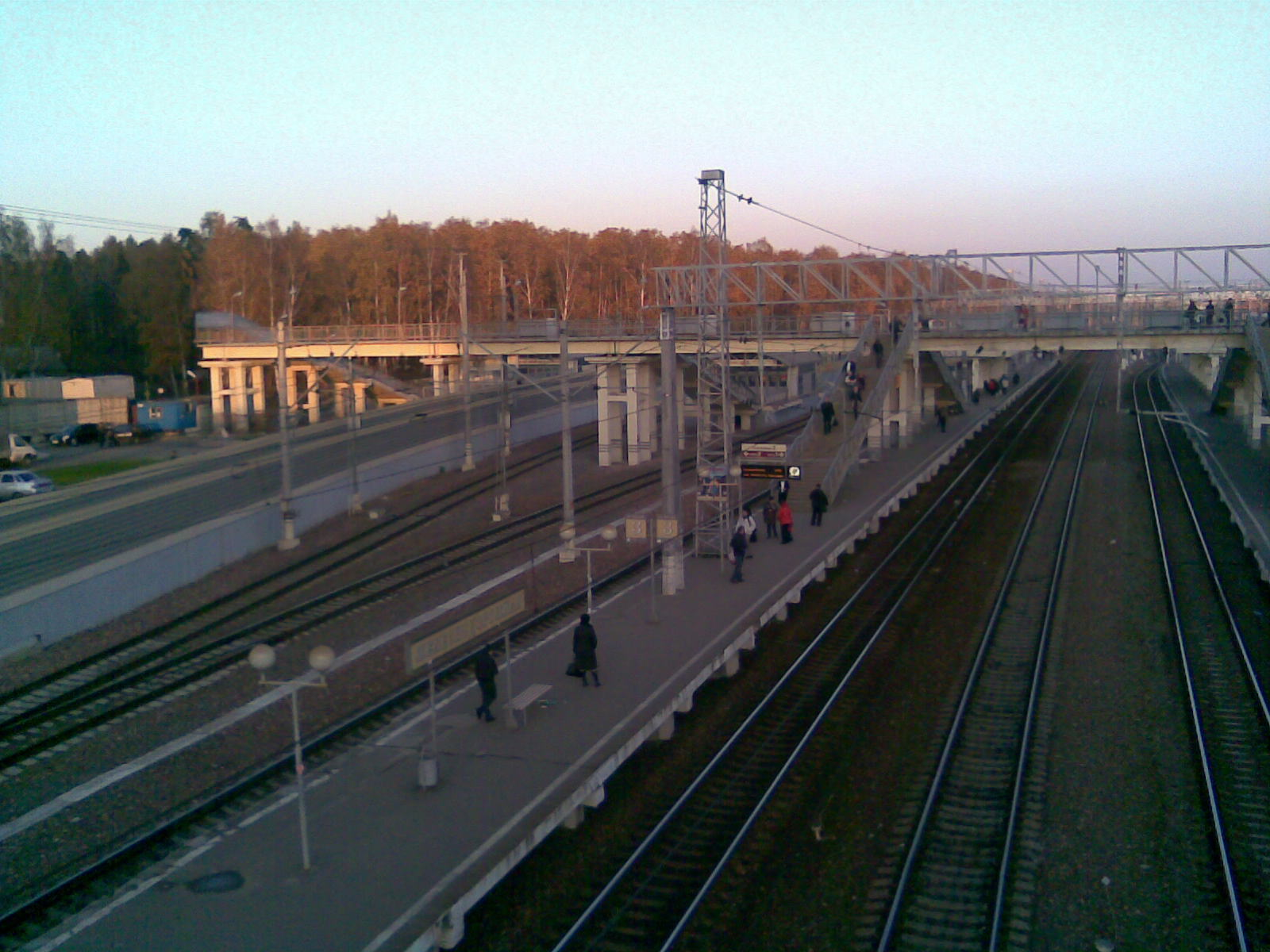
Third platform
2009

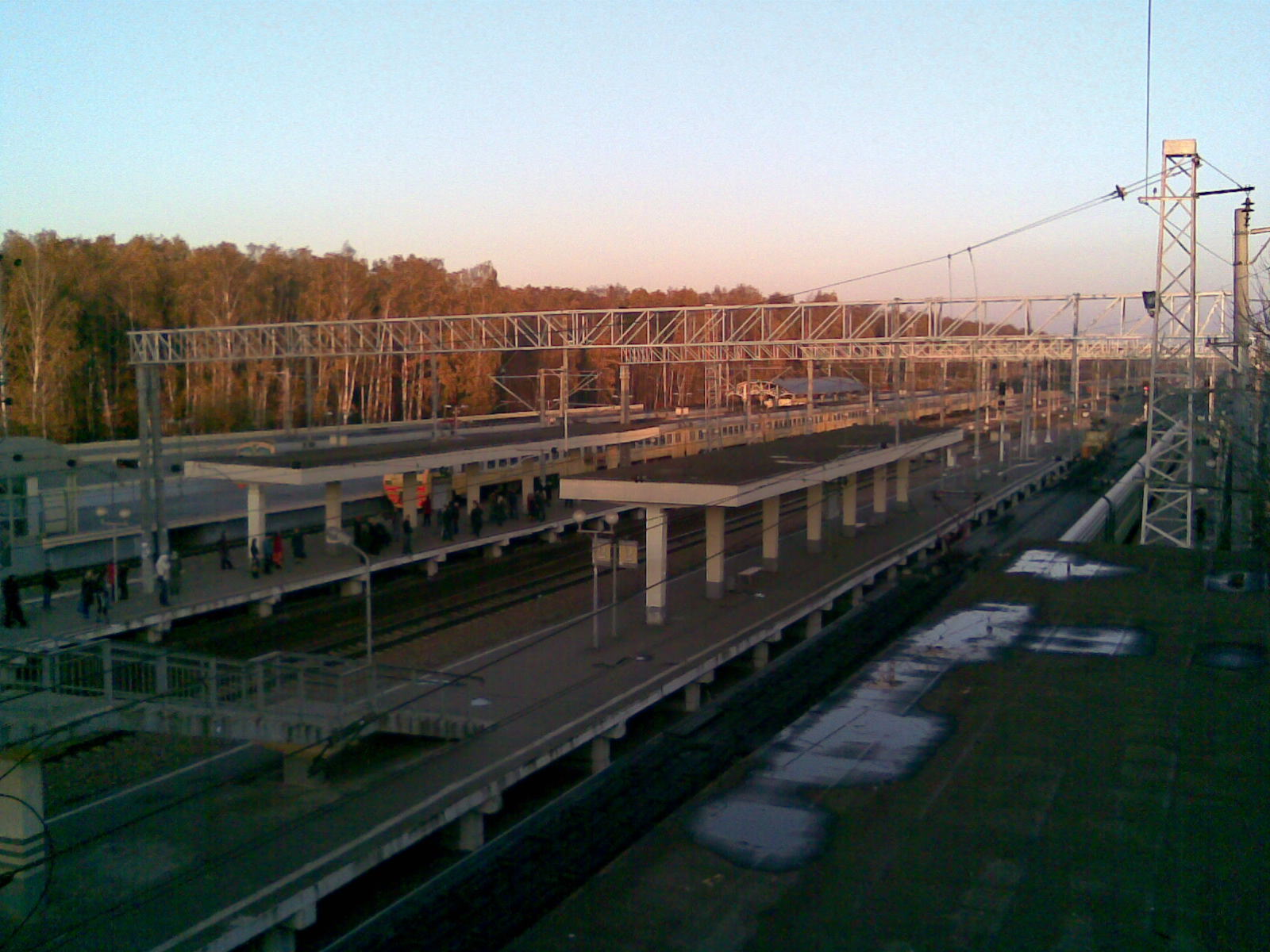
Second and third platform
2009

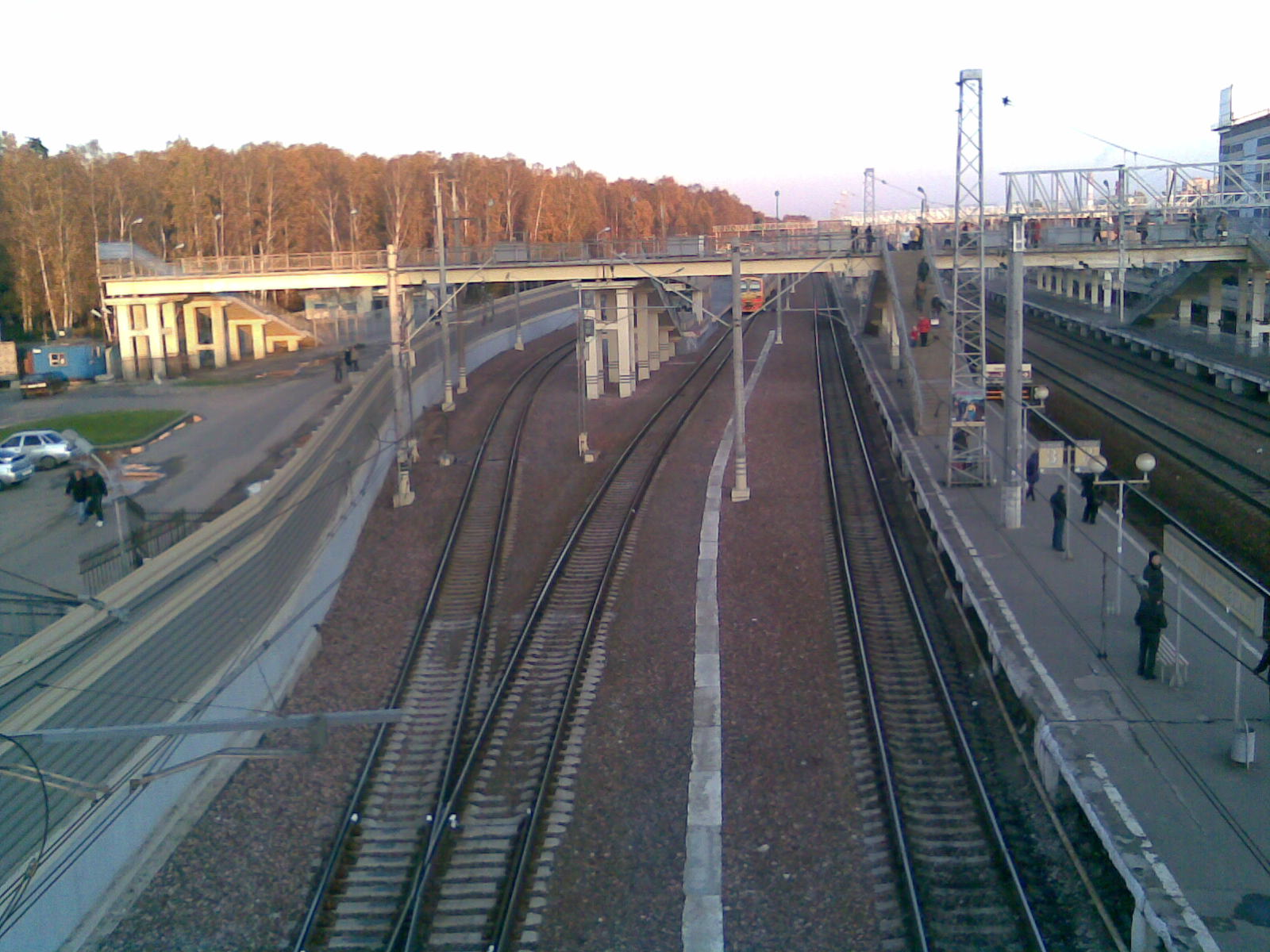
Side tracks
2009

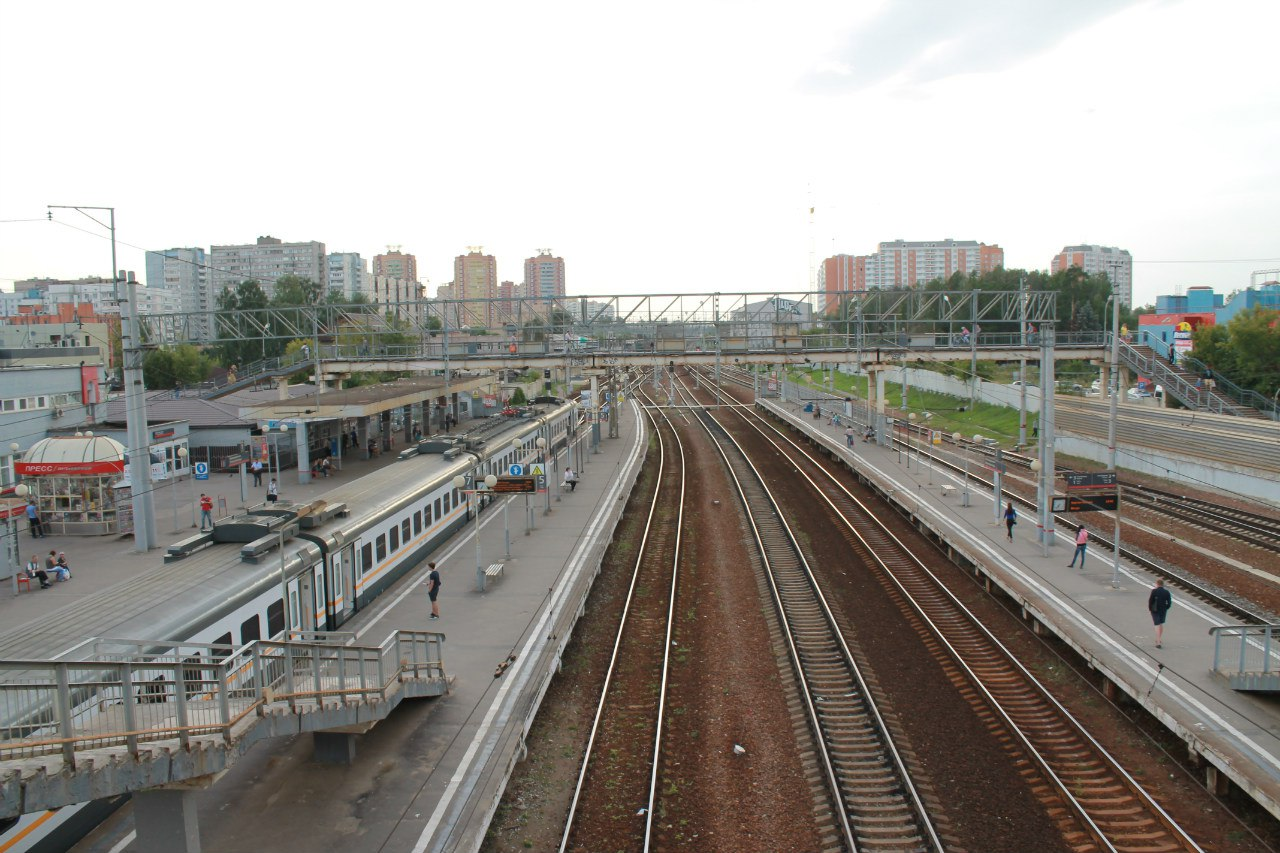
View direction to Moscow
2015

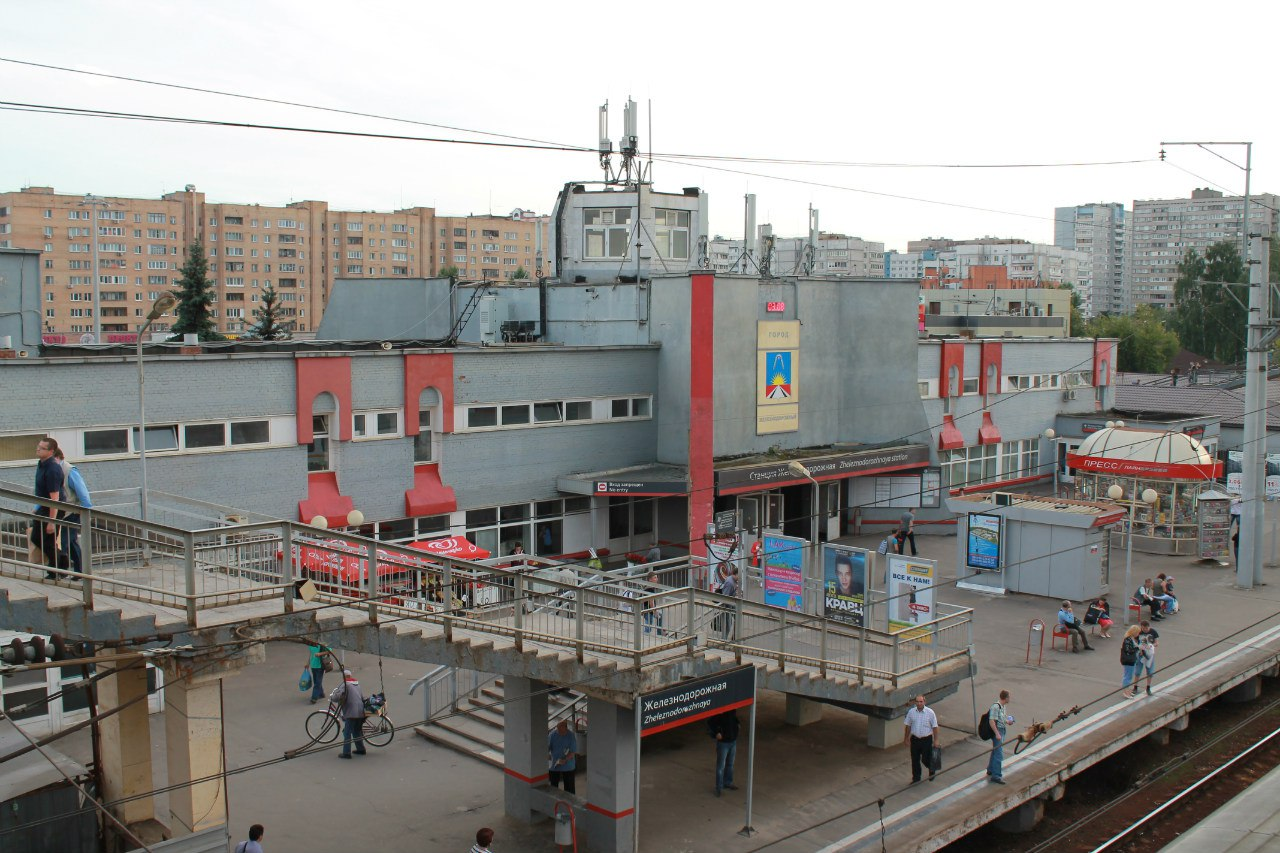
Station building
2015
