= Moscow Railway =

Railway operator in Russia

Moscow Railway Московская железная дорога
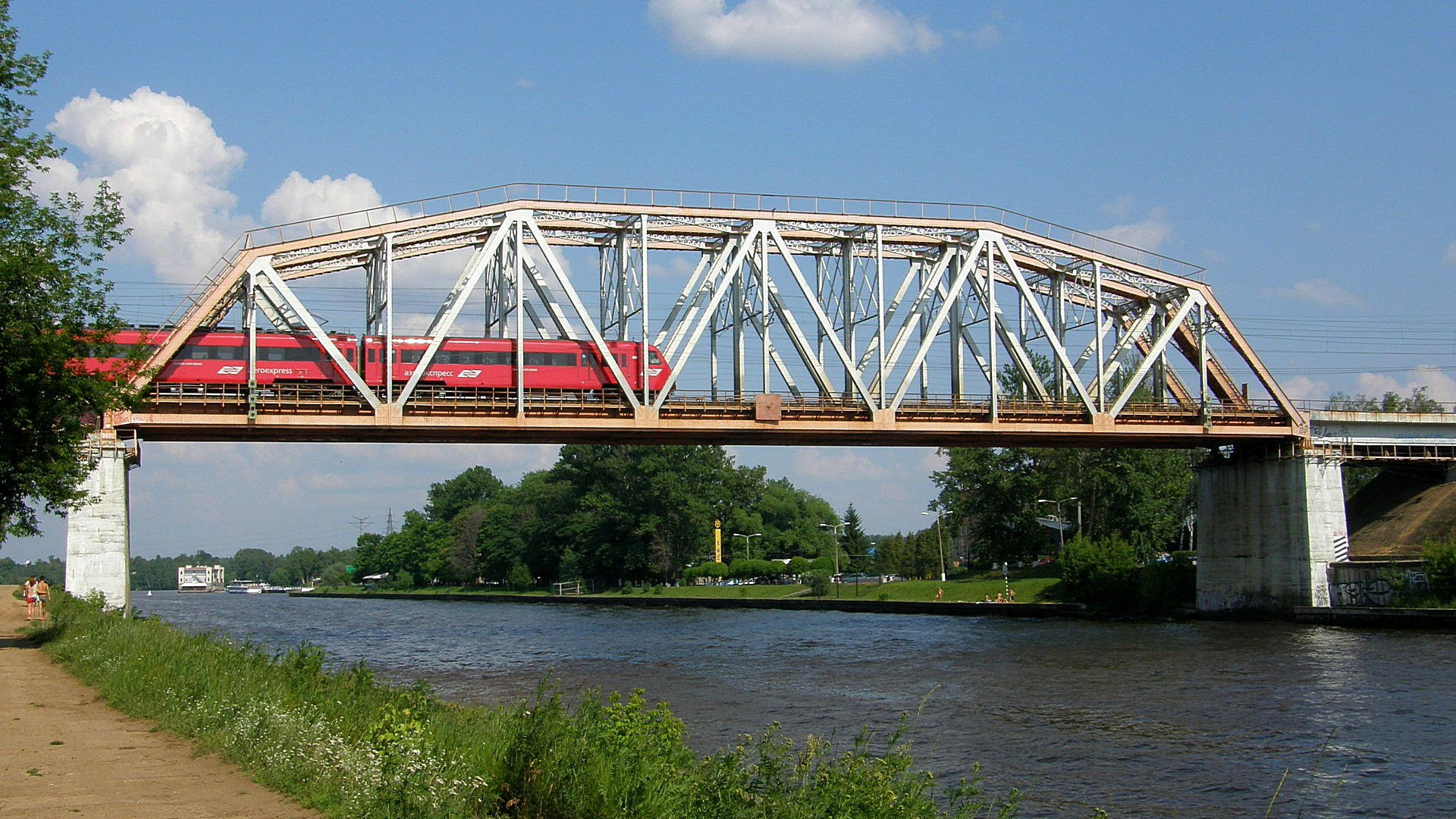
- A rail bridge on Savyolovsky suburban direction of Moscow Railway

Overview
- Headquarters: Moscow
- Locale: Central Russia, Russian Federation
- Dates of operation: 1959–present

Technical
- Track gauge: 1,520 mm (4 ft 11 27/32 in) Russian gauge
- Length: 3,275 km (2,030 mi)
Route map
Map of the Moscow Railway network.

Moscow Railway (Russian: Московская железная дорога) is a subsidiary of Russian Railways that handles half of Russia's suburban railway operations and a quarter of the country's passenger traffic. As of 2009 the railway, which has its headquarters near Komsomolskaya Square in Moscow, employed 73,600 people. It manages railway services in much of Central Russia, including Moscow and Moscow Oblast (all railways except the railroad to Saint Petersburg, which is managed by October Railway), Smolensk, Vladimir, Ryazan, Tula, Kaluga, Bryansk, Oryol, Lipetsk, and Kursk Oblasts.

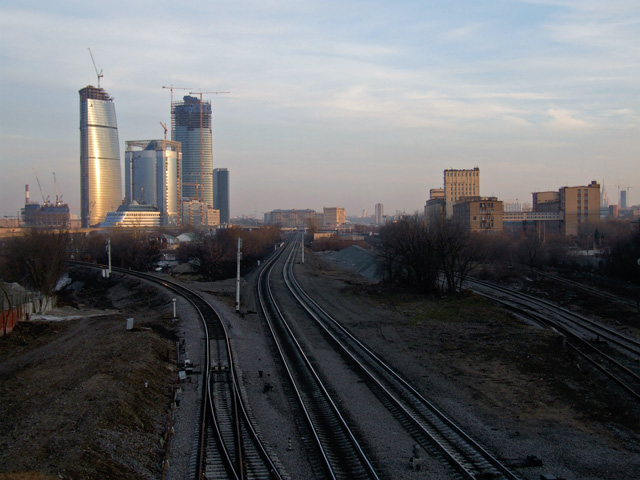
The Little Ring of the Moscow Railway in 2007, before it was converted to Moscow Central Circle.

== Railway lines ==
- Ryazansky suburban railway line
- Kazansky suburban railway line
- Gorkovsky suburban railway line
- Kursky suburban railway line
- Paveletsky suburban railway line
- Kiyevsky suburban railway line
- Belorussky suburban railway line
- Rizhsky suburban railway line
- Savyolovsky suburban railway line
- Yaroslavsky suburban railway line
- Little Ring of the Moscow Railway
- Moscow Big Ring Railway

== Construction timeline ==
- 1861 Moscow-Petushki
- 1862 Moscow-Nizhny Novgorod
- 1862 Moscow-Sergiyev Posad
- 1865 Moscow-Kolomna-Ryazan
- 1868 Serpukhov-Tula-Oryol-Kursk
- 1870 Sergiyev Posad-Alexandrov
- 1870 Moscow-Mozhaysk-Smolensk
- 1899 Moscow-Sukhinichi-Bryansk
- 1900 Moscow-Savyolovo
- 1908 Moscow Little Ring Railway
- 1943-1960 Moscow Big Ring Railway

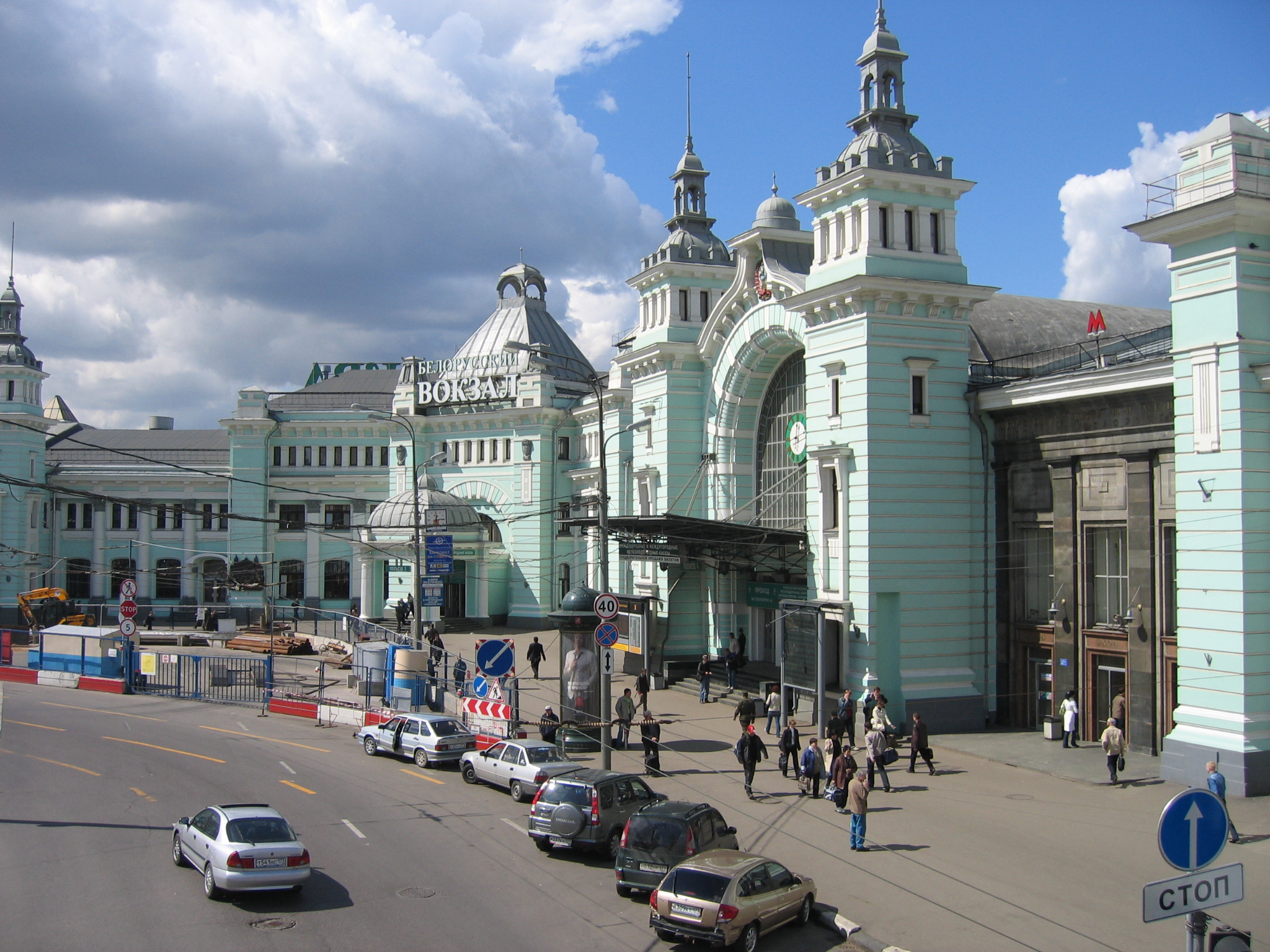
Belorussky Rail Terminal in Moscow

== Railway stations ==
- Belorussky Rail Terminal
- Kazansky Rail Terminal
- Kiyevsky Rail Terminal
- Kursky Rail Terminal
- Leningradsky Rail Terminal
- Paveletsky Rail Terminal
- Rizhsky Rail Terminal
- Savyolovsky Rail Terminal
- Yaroslavsky Rail Terminal

== See also ==
- Museum of the Moscow Railway
