= Andrey Nitchenko =

Russian poet (born 1983)

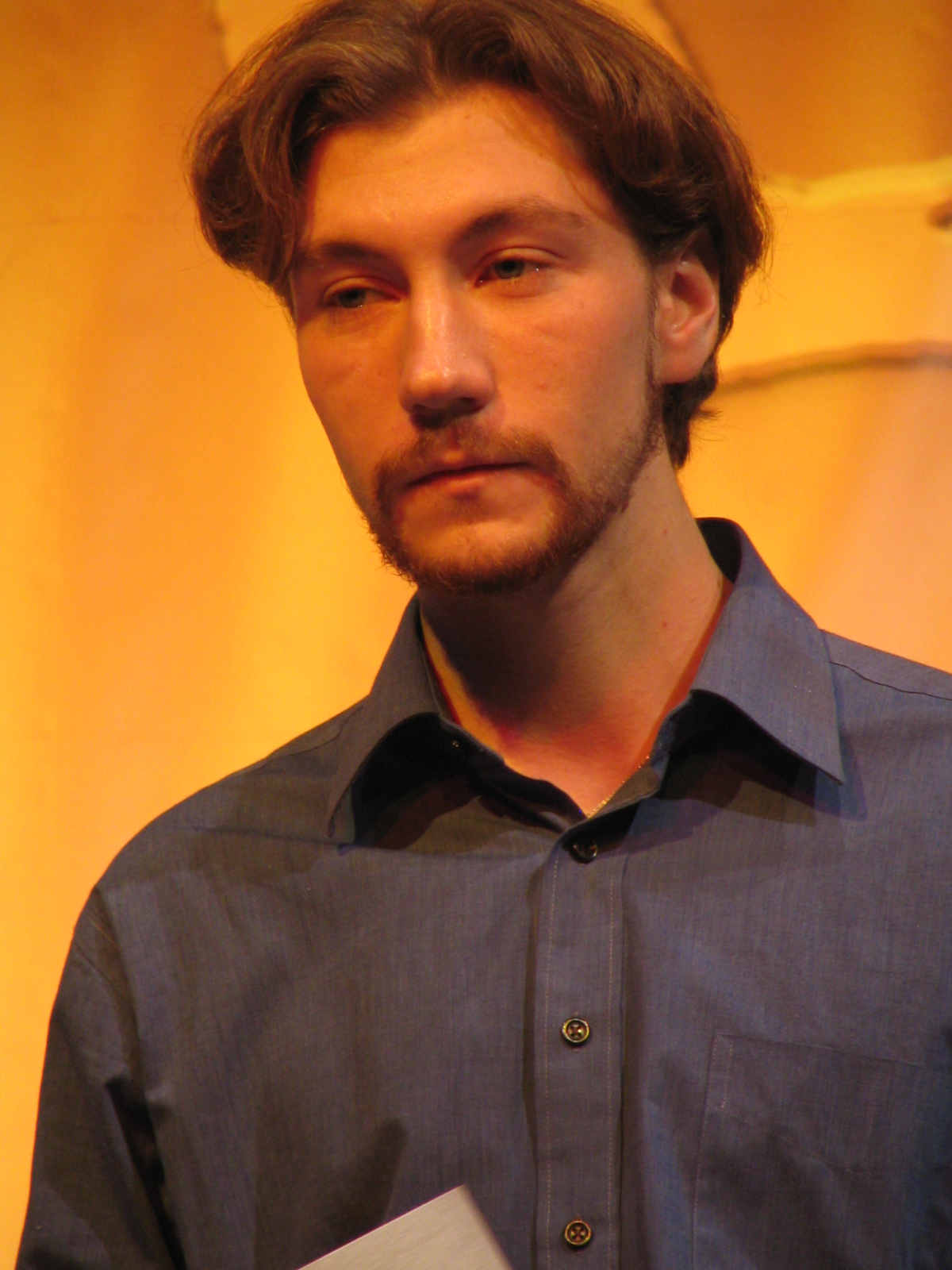
Andrey Nitchenko

Andrey Nítchenko (born 1983) is a Russian poet.

== Biography ==
Andrey Nitchenko grew up in Inta (Komi Republic, USSR). He finished the Philological faculty of the Syktyvkar University, then he studied as a postgraduate in Yaroslavl. His poetical works were published in the most authoritative poetical periodicals of Russia, such as "Arion", "Novy Mir", "Literaturnaya Gazeta" etc.

Nitchenko is winner of many prestigious literary awards: Ilya-Premiya (2004), Voloshin Prize (2004), Debut Award (2005), Commonwealth of the Debuts (2008).

== Works ==
- Vodomer ("Water meter", poems, 2005)
- Perevody na chelovecheskiy ("Translations into a Human language", poems, 2011)
