= Kraskovo =

Kraskovo (Russian: Красково) is the name of several inhabited localities in Russia.

Urban localities

- Kraskovo, Moscow Oblast, a suburban (dacha) settlement in Lyuberetsky District of Moscow Oblast

Rural localities

- Kraskovo, Ivanovo Oblast, a village in Gavrilovo-Posadsky District of Ivanovo Oblast
- Kraskovo, Kostroma Oblast, a village in Manturovsky District of Kostroma Oblast
- Kraskovo, name of several other rural localities
