= Moscow Radio Centre 13 =

Coordinates: 55°47′34″N 37°53′29″E

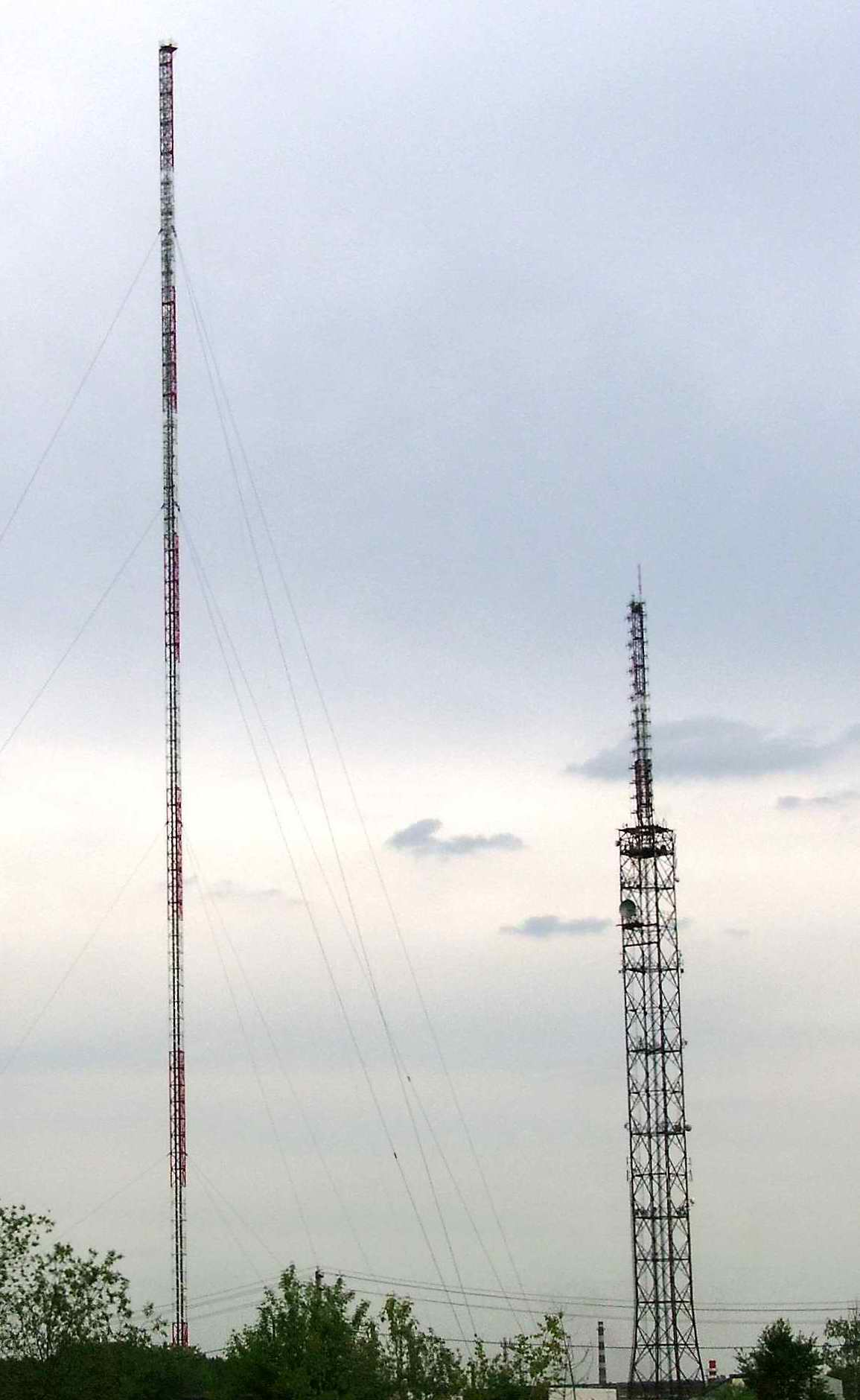
Moscow Radio Centre 13, 300 meters mast left and 176 meters tower on the right

Moscow Radio Center 13 is a transmission facility near Balashikha, approximately 3.5 km east of the ringbelt motorway of Moscow. Moscow Radio Centre 13 served in the Cold War era as jammer to block transmissions of western shortwave radio programs.

Although the radio wave jammer activities ceased in the middle of the 1980s, some occasional continuing of the jammer use occurred on March 14, 1989 to block incoming transmissions to the Lithuanian minority in Moscow area.

In later years, a tall, 176m freestanding lattice tower for transmissions was built in OIRT-band. In 2005, a new mast for FM-broadcasting was built by the Russian company Stako. This mast, called Balashikha Transmission Mast', has a triangular cross-section which is 3.6m in width. The construction originally planned for the mast to reach a height of 460m and contain six floors, however the mast has only reached a height of 300m and is constructed of 4 levels.

In the meantime, shortwave transmission was ceased at Moscow Radio Center 13. The shortwave broadcasting masts were dismantled between 2002 and 2007.

The mast was extended to 427 meters in 2014.

== Standard FM-Band ==
Name	Languages	Frequency	Website	Height of Antenna	Effective Radiated Power
Like FM	Russian	87.9MHz		384m	10kW
Humour FM	Russian	88.7MHz	http://www.veseloeradio.ru/	384m	10kW
Kalina is red	Russian	89.5MHz		414m	10kW
Radio Record	Russian	89.9MHz		384m	10kW
AvtoRadio	Russian	90.8MHz	http://www.avtoradio.ru/	414m	20kW
Relax FM	Russian	90.8MHz		384m	8kW
Says Moscow	Russian	92MHz		384m	5kW
Radio Dacha	Russian	92.4MHz		354m	10kW
Radio Carnaval	Russian	92.8MHz	http://radiokarnaval.ru/	414m	5kW
Studio 21	Russian	93.2MHz	http://sportfm.ru/	384m	5kW
Vostok FM	Russian	94.0MHz		414m	5kW
The first sports radio	Russian	94.4MHz		384m	5kW
Taxi FM	Russian	96.4MHz		414m	5kW
Children's Radio	Russian	96.8MHz		384m	5kW
Radio KP	Russian	97.2 MHz	http://radiokp.ru/	414 m	10 kW
Radio Romantika	Russian	98.8MHz		384m	10kW
Russian hit	Russian	99.6MHz			10kW
Heat FM	Russian	100.5MHz		354m	10kW
Comedy radio	Russian	102.5MHz		414m	10kW
Radio Chanson	Russian	103MHz	http://www.chanson.ru/	384m	10kW
Energy (NRJ)	Russian	104.2MHz	https://www.energyfm.ru/	414m	15kW
Love radio	Russian	106.6MHz	https://www.loveradio.ru/	384m	10kW
Kiss FM	Russian	107MHz		414m	5kW
Hit FM	Russian	107.4MHz		384m	5kW
Militia Wave	Russian	107.8MHz		414m	5kW

== See also ==
- Russian 460 meter radio mast
- List of Russian-language radio stations
