= Verkhnyaya Inta =

Verkhnyaya Inta Верхняя Инта
- Urban-type settlement

Other transcription(s)
  - Komi: Вылыс Инта
- Interactive map of Verkhnyaya Inta
- Location of Verkhnyaya Inta Verkhnyaya Inta (Komi Republic)
- Coordinates: 65°59′N 60°20′E
- Country: Russia
- Federal subject: Komi Republic
- Urban-type settlement administrative territorySelsoviet: Verkhnyaya Inta Urban-Type Settlement Administrative Territory

Population (2010 Census)
  - Total: 1,106
  - Estimate (2025): 378 (−65.8%)

Administrative status
  - Subordinated to: town of republic significance of Inta
  - Capital of: Verkhnyaya Inta Urban-Type Settlement Administrative Territory

Municipal status
  - Urban okrug: Inta Urban Okrug
- Time zone: UTC+3 (MSK)
- Postal code: 169834
- OKTMO ID: 87715000056

Verkhnyaya Inta population
- 2010 Census: 1,106
- 2002 Census: 2,077
- 1989 Census: 4,496
- 1979 Census: 4,284

Verkhnyaya Inta (Russian: Верхняя Инта; Komi: Вылыс Инта, Vylys Inta) is an urban locality (an urban-type settlement) under the administrative jurisdiction of the town of republic significance of Inta in the Komi Republic, Russia. As of the 2010 Census, its population was 1,106.

== Administrative and municipal status ==
Within the framework of administrative divisions, the urban-type settlement of Verkhnyaya Inta, together with one rural locality (the settlement of Kochmes), is incorporated as Verkhnyaya Inta Urban-Type Settlement Administrative Territory, which is subordinated to the town of republic significance of Inta. Within the framework of municipal divisions, Verkhnyaya Inta is a part of Inta Urban Okrug.
