= Jovilabe =

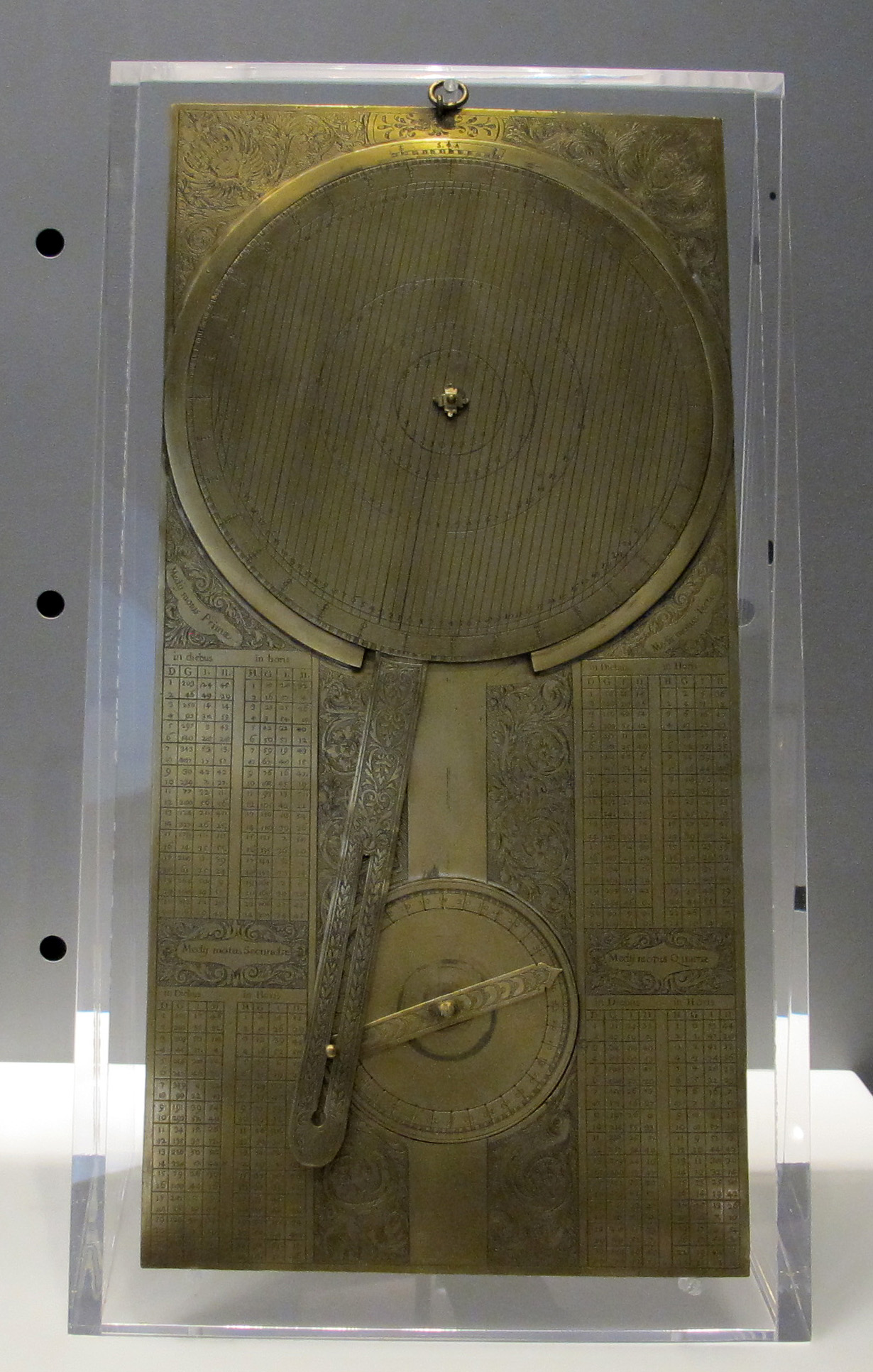
Galileo's jovilabe. Estate of Leopold de' Medici

The jovilabe is a brass scientific instrument, undated and of unknown maker, currently in the collection of the Museo Galileo in Florence, Italy.

The jovilabe was used by Galileo Galilei to determine the orbital periods of Jupiter's moons and to compute the times of their eclipses. The instrument is engraved with tables showing the mean motions of each of the four moons. Two connected disks of different diameters are rotated by means of a movable rod. They are used to create a "view from the Sun" of the movements of Jupiter's moons observed from the Earth (movements that seem irregular because of the heliocentric motions of the Earth and Jupiter).

After announcing the discovery of Jupiter's moons in his 1610 treatise Sidereus Nuncius, Galileo began the systematic study of their periods in 1611, developing a micrometer for the purpose. Galileo immediately realized that eclipses of the moons could provide a precise method to determine longitude. Galileo compiled tables of the periods that he offered, with his telescopes, first to the King of Spain (1611, 1612, 1616, and 1627–1628), then to the States General of Holland (1637–1641). To convince his Spanish interlocutors that Jupiter and its moons could be observed on unstable ground, such as a ship's deck, Galileo designed a special helmet carrying a small telescope on a hinged mount. The device was named the celatone (celata = "helmet" in Italian). In this second proposal, he also described the advantages of applying the pendulum to the clock. Despite the interest they aroused, neither of his proposals were accepted.

== Bibliography ==
- Mara Miniati, ed. (1991). Museo di storia della scienza: catalogo. Firenze: Giunti. p. 60, board n. 3. ISBN 88-09-20036-5.
- Righini Bonelli, Maria Luisa (1971). "Galileo, l'orologio, il giovilabio". Physis Riv. Internaz. Storia Sci. 13 (4): 412–420.
- Bedini, Silvio A (1986). "The Galilean jovilabe". Nuncius. 1 (1): 24–26.
