= Kozhym =

Kozhym Кожым
- Urban-type settlement
- Interactive map of Kozhym
- Location of Kozhym Kozhym (Komi Republic)
- Coordinates: 65°44′N 59°32′E
- Country: Russia
- Federal subject: Komi Republic
- Urban-type settlement administrative territorySelsoviet: Kozhym Urban-Type Settlement Administrative Territory

Population (2010 Census)
  - Total: 10
  - Estimate (2021): 0 (−100%)

Administrative status
  - Subordinated to: town of republic significance of Inta
  - Capital of: Kozhym Urban-Type Settlement Administrative Territory

Municipal status
  - Urban okrug: Inta Urban Okrug
- Time zone: UTC+3 (MSK)
- Postal code: 169820
- OKTMO ID: 87715000061

Kozhym population
- 2010 Census: 10
- 2002 Census: 56
- 1989 Census: 733
- 1979 Census: 802

Kozhym (Russian: Кожым) is an urban locality (an urban-type settlement) under the administrative jurisdiction of the town of republic significance of Inta in the Komi Republic, Russia. As of the 2010 Census, its population was 10.

== Administrative and municipal status ==
Within the framework of administrative divisions, the urban-type settlement of Kozhym, together with three rural localities, is incorporated as Kozhym Urban-Type Settlement Administrative Territory, which is subordinated to the town of republic significance of Inta. Within the framework of municipal divisions, Kozhym is a part of Inta Urban Okrug.
