= Balashikha =

City in Moscow Oblast, Russia

Balashikha Балашиха
- City
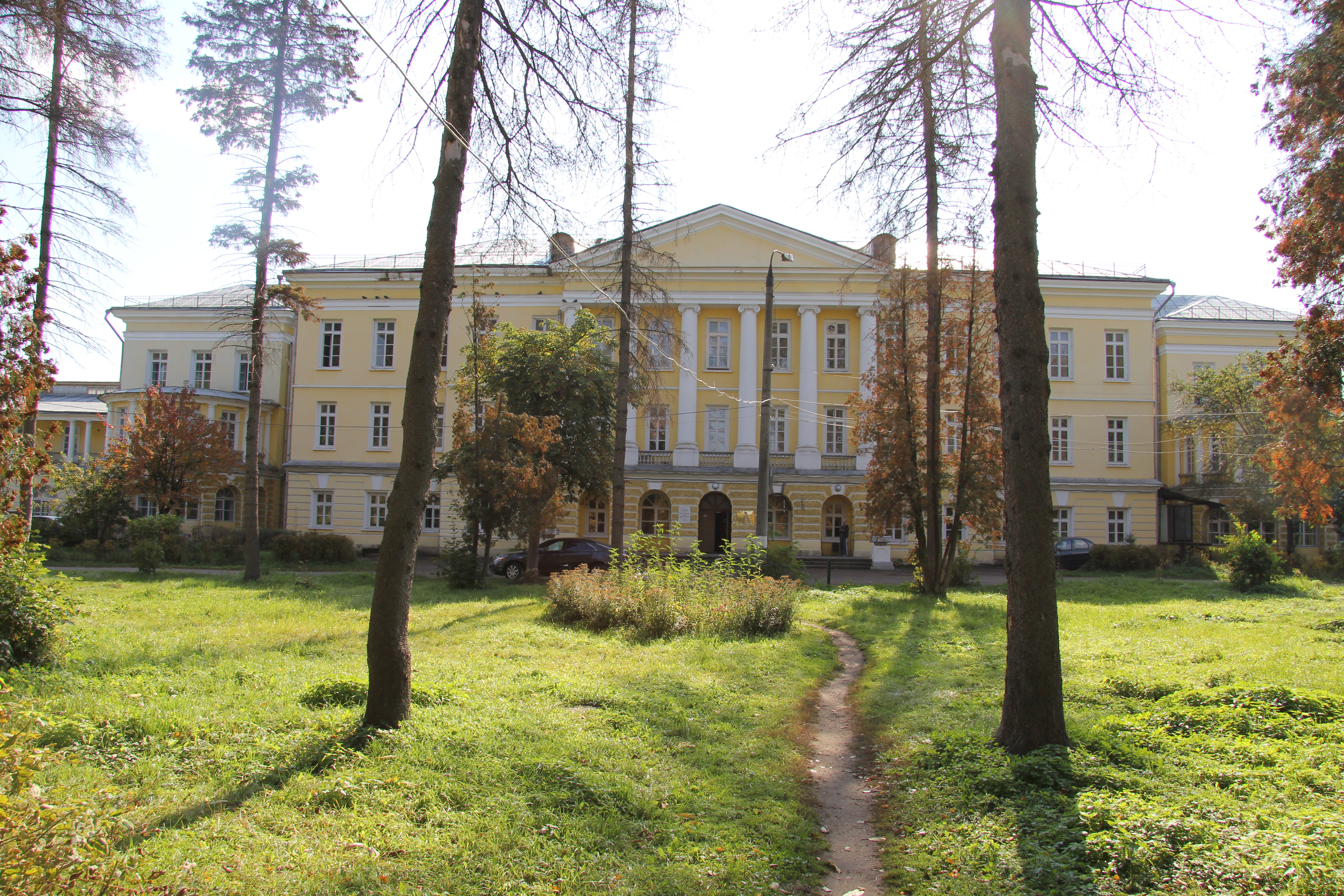
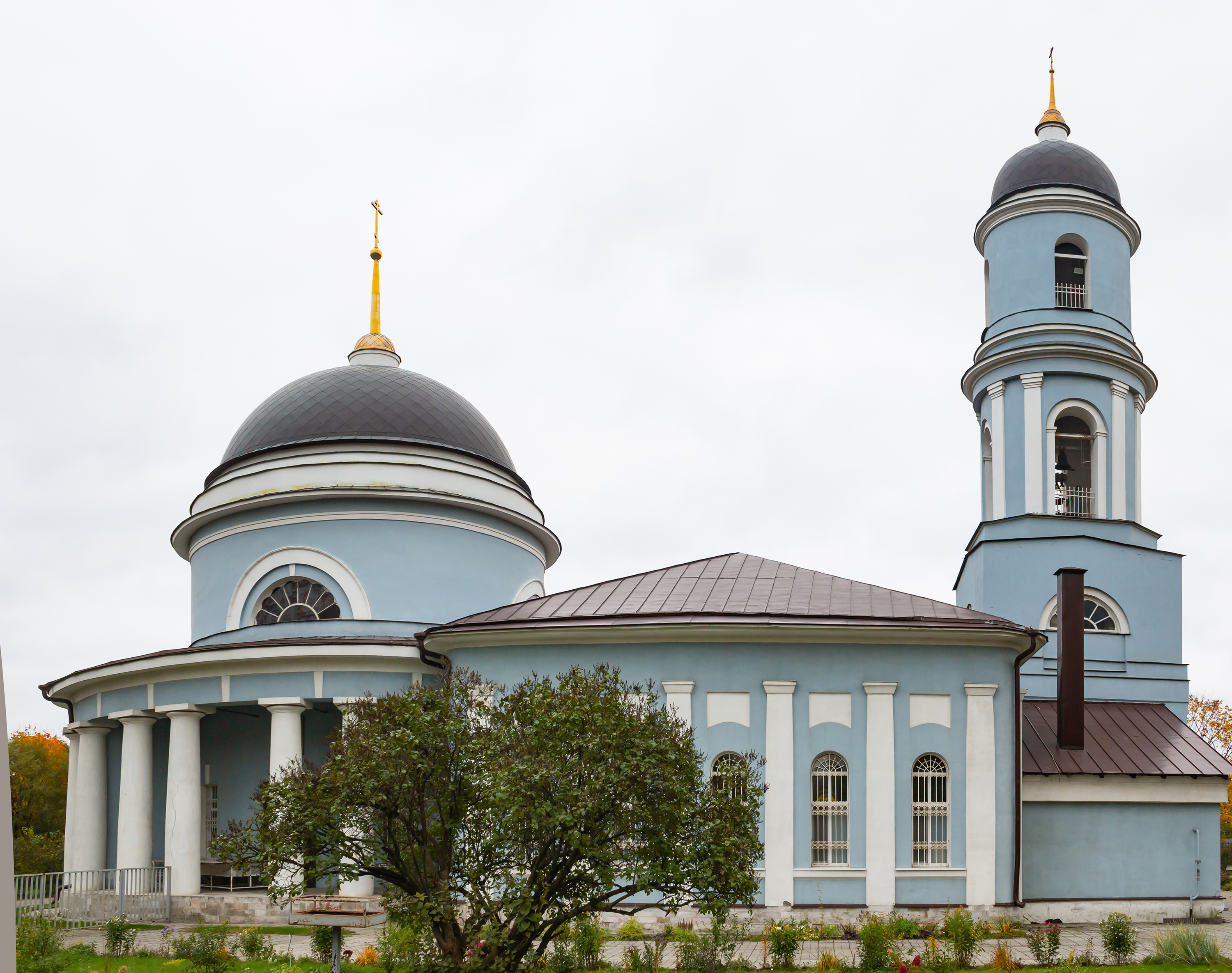
- Church of the Transfiguration Gorenki estate Church of the Intercession of the Most Holy Mother of God

- Flag Coat of arms
- Interactive map of Balashikha
- Location of Balashikha Balashikha (Europe) Balashikha (Russia)
- Coordinates: 55°49′N 37°58′E
- Country: Russia
- Federal subject: Moscow Oblast
- Founded: 1830
- City status since: 1939

Government
  - Body: Council of Deputies
  - Head: Sergey Lukichev

Area
  - Total: 244.18 km^{2} (94.28 sq mi)
- Elevation: 150 m (490 ft)

Population (2010 Census)
  - Total: 215,494
  - Estimate (2025): 544,303 (+152.6%)
  - Rank: 86th in 2010
  - Density: 882.52/km^{2} (2,285.7/sq mi)

Administrative status
  - Subordinated to: Balashikha City Under Oblast Jurisdiction
  - Capital of: Balashikha City Under Oblast Jurisdiction

Municipal status
  - Urban okrug: Balashikha Urban Okrug
  - Capital of: Balashikha Urban Okrug
- Time zone: UTC+3 (MSK)
- Postal code: 143xxx
- Dialing code: +7 495
- OKTMO ID: 46704000001
- Website: www.balashiha.ru

Balashikha (Russian: Балашиха, IPA: [bəlɐˈʂɨxə]) is the most populous city in Moscow Oblast, Russia. It is located on the Pekhorka River 1 kilometer (0.62 mi) east of the Moscow Ring Road. Population: 520,962 (2021 census); 215,494 (2010 census); 147,909 (2002 census); 135,841 (1989 Soviet census).

Historical population
Year	Pop.	±%
1926	7,674	—
1939	28,766	+274.9%
1959	57,600	+100.2%
1970	92,316	+60.3%
1979	117,906	+27.7%
1989	135,841	+15.2%
2002	147,909	+8.9%
2010	215,494	+45.7%
2021	520,962	+141.8%
Source: Census data

== Etymology ==
In Finno-Ugric languages, Bala-shika means land of celebrations, land of laughter and fun. Finnic peoples lived in this area before Slavs.

== Geography ==
The city is known for its unique river and waterway system. The Pekhorka River system covers an area of 40 kilometers (25 mi) from north to south and 20 kilometers (12 mi) from east to west, and many small lakes and ponds were created by damming to provide water power for the cotton mills in the 19th century.

== History ==
Balashikha was established in 1830. It was granted town status in 1939. Several rural hamlets had existed long before on the site of the modern city.

The city stands on the famous Vladimir Highway, which led out of Moscow to the east. This was the route along which convicted criminals were marched to forced labor camps in Siberia. The road was renamed Gorky Highway in the Soviet era. The failure of the Decembrist Revolt against Tsar Nicholas I led to the execution of its ringleaders and the exile of many nobles to Siberia. Soviet-era schoolchildren were told that the prisoners were marched in chains along this road followed by their wives. In truth, the Decembrist prisoners were sent from St. Petersburg, then the capital of Russia, through Yaroslavl, and not through Moscow and Balashikha, and the story was invented as part of celebrations of the 100th anniversary of the event in 1925.

Between 1830 and 1870, a cotton factory was in operation in the area, with its fabric called Balashikha. A railway station was built at the end of the 19th century, again called Balashikha Station.

As it grew, Balashikha absorbed other villages, including Gorenki, a suburban estate of Count Andreas Razumovsky, and Pekhra-Yakovlevskoye, an estate of the Princes Galitzine, the latter being in use for 250 years from 1591 to 1828. This is the site of a stone church, built from 1777 to 1782.

Saltykovka, a part of Balashikha, has long been known for its attractions to the artistic community. Isaak Levitan, the famous landscape painter, lived there in 1879. Lev Tolstoy was another frequent visitor.

=== Soviet period ===
Several institutions were founded in Balashikha after the October Revolution, including one dedicated to the production of fur.

During the Soviet era, Balashikha became a major industrial center with industries in metallurgy, aviation industry, cryogenic technology, machinery, and other fields.

Balashikha sent many of its sons to the front to fight the Germans during World War II. Among those who fought and died was Ivan Flerov who commanded a Katyusha rocket division and is remembered by several monuments and museums in the area.

Along with many other Russian Orthodox Churches, the Cathedral of Saint Alexander Nevsky was demolished by the government. The cathedral was blown up in the 1960s but was rebuilt, on its original site, in 2002. Additionally, Afghan operatives of the KhAD agency were sent to Balashikha for training under the Democratic Republic of Afghanistan.

=== Modernity ===
The Balashikha Maternity House was designated on July 1, 2003, to be the Moscow Oblast Perinatal Center. This facility will now function as a regional perinatal care facility for high-risk mothers and infants and a perinatal health education center for Moscow Oblast.

Although not part of the extensive Moscow subway system, Balashikha is home to many office workers who commute to Moscow each day. It has several markets and retail centers and is quickly modernizing, and is surrounded by woodlands and countryside.

In January 2015, the city of Zheleznodorozhny was abolished with its territory merged into Balashikha.

== Administrative and municipal status ==
Within the framework of administrative divisions, it is, together with twelve rural localities, incorporated as Balashikha City Under Oblast Jurisdiction—an administrative unit with the status equal to that of the districts. As a municipal division, Balashikha City Under Oblast Jurisdiction is incorporated as Balashikha Urban Okrug.

In the past, Balashikha served as the administrative center of Balashikhinsky District. On January 1, 2011, the district was abolished.

== Sport ==
The 2017 national rink bandy cup took place in Balashikha.

Balashikha is a home to FC Balashikha, Meteor Balashikha and Olimp-SKOPA Zheleznodorozhny football teams.

Ice Palace Balashikha Arena was opened in 2007. From 2007 to 2010 it was a home venue for HC MVD, that took part in Kontinental Hockey League and from 2019 to 2022 it hosted Avangard Omsk that won Gagarin Cup in 2020-21 season.

== Culture ==
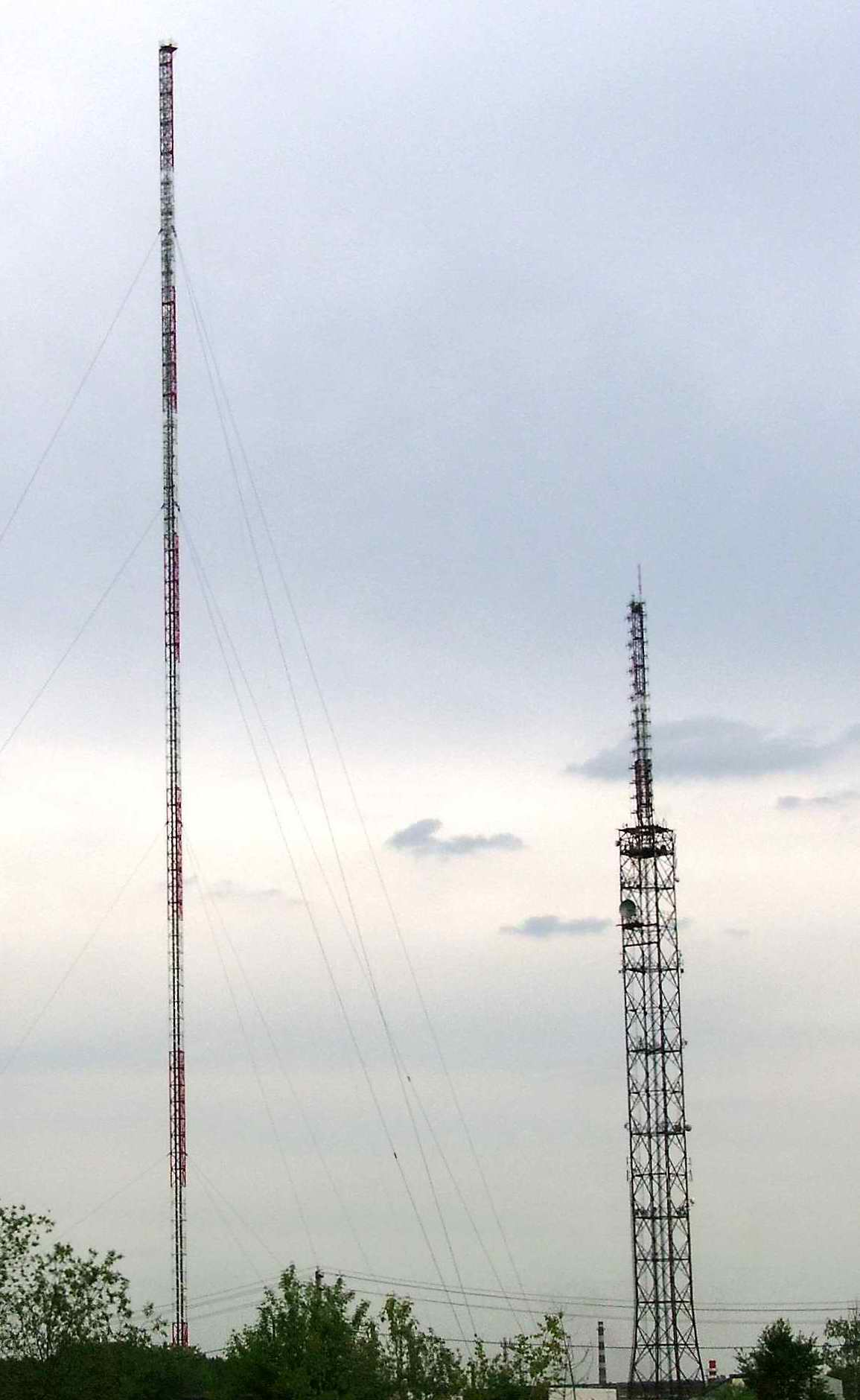
Balashikha radio tower - 300-meters mast left and 176-meters tower on the right

The city is home to several music schools, including the Sviridov School of Arts. Attractions include the Balashikha Arena and Moscow Radio Center 13.

== Military ==
Balashikha is the site of a large Russian Army base and was closed to foreigners during the Soviet era, a ban which, in theory, remains to the present day. It was the headquarters of the 1st Corps of the Soviet Air Defense Forces and is now to become the headquarters of the Operational-Strategic Command for Missile-Space Defense. Balashikha is also a base for ODON (Internal security division). Balashikha is home to Military Unit 35690, which is a training facility used by the Federal Security Service.

== Notable people ==
- Yuri Lyapkin (1945 - 2026), ice hockey player
- Nikolay Baskov, tenor singer
- Dmitry Klokov, Honored Master of Sports in weightlifting
- Andrey Kuznetsov, tennis player
- Artyom Avanesyan, Armenian footballer
- Georgi Dzhikiya, footballer
- Ivan Konovalov, footballer

== Twin towns – sister cities ==
Balashikha is twinned with:

- Martin, Slovakia
- Pernik, Bulgaria
- Yangzhou, China
