= Chayka transmitter Slonim =

Chayka transmitter Slonim is the 2nd secondary station of the Western Russian Chain RSDN-3 (GRI 8000) with a transmission power of 450 kW. Chayka transmitter Slonim, situated near Slonim, Belarus at 53°7′55.2″N 25°23′46″E.

== See also ==
- LORAN
