= Russian 460 metre radio mast =

The Russian 460 metres radio masts are among the most secret supertall structures ever built. Three such masts, which were developed by Stako, were erected in mid-1980s near Inta, Dudinka and Taymylyr as masts for the North Siberian Chayka Chain for transmitting navigation signals on 100 kHz with 1200 kW.

All these masts are grounded lattice structures of tubular steel elements with triangular cross section. The side length of the triangle of the mast body is 3.6 metres. Each of these masts is guyed in 6 levels.

These masts were at completion the tallest structures in Asia and are still the second-tallest in Russia.

In 2003 at Moscow Radio Centre 13 a guyed mast for FM-transmission of the same type was built, which is however just 300 metres and not 460 metres tall. It is guyed in 4 levels.

On September 24, 2009, the mast at Taymylyr was demolished by explosives, which was the tallest object ever demolished in this way.
