= Pekhorka =

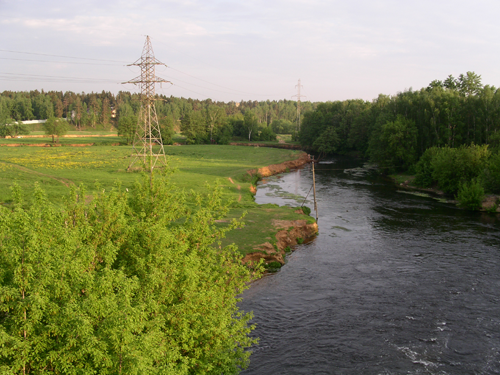
- Pekhorka as seen from the railway bridge between Tomilino and Kraskovo
- Native name: Пехорка (Russian)

Location
- Country: Russia

Physical characteristics
- Mouth: Moskva
  - coordinates: 55.5957°N 38.0585°E
- Length: 42 km (26 mi)
- Basin size: 523 km^{2} (202 sq mi)

Basin features
- Progression: Moskva→ Oka→ Volga→ Caspian Sea

The Pekhorka (Russian: Пехо́рка) is a river in the Moscow Region in Russia, a left tributary of the Moskva. It is 42 kilometres (26 mi) long, and has a drainage basin of 523 square kilometres (202 sq mi).

Flows from the north point in 1,5 km from Lukino village to the south, where it passes Moscow through Izmailovo, Kuskovo and Kosino (that part of the river in Moscow is about 10 km). Three ponds - one on the north of Lukino, one near Pekhra-Pokrovskoye village and one in Balashiha-2 microdistrict.

Balashikha and Zheleznodorozhniy cities are located on the river as well as Tomilino and Kraskovo settlements.

Name etymology probably comes from the Old Slavonic «Ṕh» (Cyrillic: «пьх») with the «ur» (Cyrillic: «ъръ») suffix which means «to push».

River was included into the 1971 Moscow General Development Plant which constitutes special emphasis on the construction of Eastern Navigable Channel. This channel was intended to decongest the navigation through Moscow via Moscow River. Pekhorka would become a part of Lyubertsy Reservoir, the largest water basin in Moscow Region. Channel was never built.
