= Inta =

Town in the Komi Republic, Russia

Inta Инта
- Town
- Flag Coat of arms
- Interactive map of Inta
- Location of Inta Inta (European Russia) Inta (Arctic)
- Coordinates: 66°05′N 60°08′E
- Country: Russia
- Federal subject: Komi Republic
- Founded: 1942
- Elevation: 50 m (160 ft)

Population (2010 Census)
  - Total: 32,080
  - Estimate (2024): 19,372 (−39.6%)

Administrative status
  - Subordinated to: town of republic significance of Inta
  - Capital of: town of republic significance of Inta

Municipal status
  - Urban okrug: Inta Urban Okrug
  - Capital of: Inta Urban Okrug
- Time zone: UTC+3 (MSK)
- Postal code: 169840–169849
- OKTMO ID: 87715000001
- Website: adminta.ru

Inta (Russian: Инта́, Komi: Инта) is a town in the Komi Republic, Russia. Population: 32,080 (2010 census); 41,217 (2002 census); 60,220 (1989 Soviet census).

== History ==
Inta was founded around 1940 as a settlement to support a geological expedition to explore coal deposits and projecting of mines. The city and a separate forced labor camp (Intalag) was built by deportees and political prisoners working in the coal mines of the Pechora coal basin.

The city's name is in the Nenets language and means 'well-watered place.'

During the Soviet era, a "corrective labor camp", Intalag, was located here.

== Administrative and municipal status ==
Within the framework of administrative divisions, it is, together with two urban-type settlements (Verkhnyaya Inta and Kozhym) and twenty rural localities, incorporated as the town of republic significance of Inta—an administrative unit with the status equal to that of the districts. As a municipal division, the town of republic significance of Inta is incorporated as Inta Urban Okrug.

== Transportation ==
It is served by the Inta Airport and the Kotlas–Vorkuta railway line. Inta is situated on the banks of the river Bolshoya Inta.

== Transmitter ==
At Inta, there is a CHAYKA-transmitter with a 460-meter tall guyed mast, which is the second-tallest structure in Europe.

== Notable people ==
- Birthplace of Soviet national hockey team player Viktor Zhluktov
- Birthplace of Belarusian national hockey team, NHL, and KHL player Vladimir Tsyplakov
