= CHAYKA =

Radio navigation system

Chayka pulse

Chayka (Russian: Чайка, lit. "gull") also known as Radiotekhnicheskaya Sistema Dal'ney Navigatsii abbreviated as RSDN (lit. Radio-technology System for Distant Navigation) is a Russian terrestrial radio navigation system, similar to Loran-C. It operates on similar frequencies around 100 kHz, and uses the same techniques of comparing both the envelope and the signal phase to accurately determine location. The systems differ primarily in details.

== Chayka-Chains ==
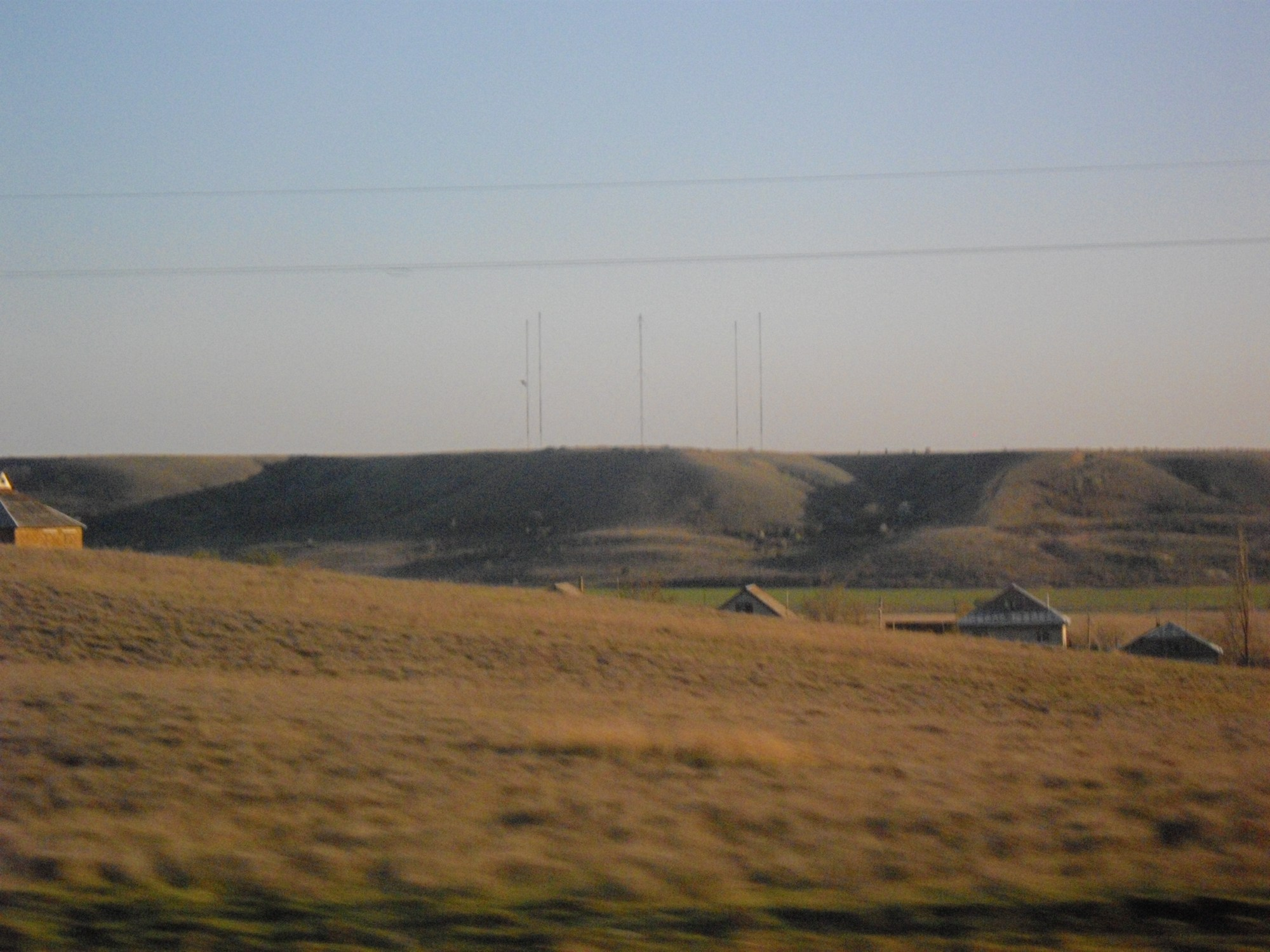
At the hill – RSDN-3/10, Crimea

Chayka, like LORAN-C, uses different pulse repetition frequencies (Group Repetition Intervals, or GRIs) to allow the identification of different stations operating on the same frequencies.

There are 5 Chayka chains in use:

- GRI 8000 — Western (European) Russia Chayka Chain (1969, RSDN-3/10)
- GRI 7950 — Eastern Russia Chayka Chain (1986, RSDN-4)
- GRI 5980 — Russian-American Chayka Chain (1995)
- GRI 5960 — Northern Chayka Chain (1996, RSDN-5)
- GRI 4970 — North-Western Chayka Chain
- And also North-Caucasian, South-Ural (GRI 5970), Siberian, Angarsk, Sayansk, Transbaikalian, Far East chains deployed on the basis of low-power mobile stations RSDN-10.

== Chayka Transmitters ==
The following Chayka transmitters work with very high power and may use very tall mast antennas (similar to LORAN-C transmitters). The masts at Dudinka and Taymylyr (demolished in 2009) were 460 metres high.

=== GRI 8000 ===
#	Place	Coordinates	Emission delay, μs	Coding delay, μs	Transmission power, kW
M	Karachev (44 km from Bryansk)	53°7′49.2″N 34°54′36.8″E			450
W/1	Petrozavodsk	61°45′32.4″N 33°41′40.4″E	13217.21	10000	700
X/2	Slonim (Belarus)	53°7′55.2″N 25°23′46″E	27125.00	25000	450
Y/3	Simferopol	44°53′20.18″N 33°52′23.79″E	53070.25	50000	550
Z/4	Syzran	53°17′17.6″N 48°6′53.4″E	67941.60	65000	700

=== GRI 7950 ===
#	Place	Coordinates	Emission delay, μs	Coding delay, μs	Transmission power, kW
M	Alexandrovsk-Sakhalinsky	51°4′42.81″N 142°42′4.95″E			700
W/1	Petropavlovsk-Kamchatsky	53°7′48.26″N 157°41′49.1″E	14506.5	11000	700
X/2	Ussuriysk	44°31′58.24″N 131°38′28.6″E	33678.0	30000	700
Y/3	Tokachibuto (Japan)	42°44′37.2″N 143°43′10.5″E	49104.15	46000	600
Z/4	Okhotsk	59°25′1.77″N 143°5′18.68″E	64102.05	61000	10

=== GRI 5980 ===
#	Place	Coordinates	Emission delay, μs	Coding delay, μs	Transmission power, kW
M	Petropavlovsk-Kamchatsky	53°7′48.26″N 157°41′49.1″E			700
W/1	Attu Island (United States)	52°49′44″N 173°10′49.7″E	14506.5	11000	400
X/2	Alexandrovsk-Sakhalinsky	51°4′42.80″N 142°42′4.95″E	31506.5	28000	700

=== GRI 5960 ===
(No longer in service)

#	Place	Coordinates	Emission delay, μs	Coding delay, μs	Transmission power, kW
M	Dudinka	69°21′45.20″N 86°41′50.56″E			1200
W/1	Taymylyr	72°34′48.92″N 122°06′40.29″E			1200
X/2	Pankratiev Island	76°7′34″N 60°12′55″E			250
Y/3	Inta	65°57′59.57″N 60°18′33.5″E			1200

=== GRI 4970 ===
#	Place	Coordinates	Emission delay, μs	Coding delay, μs	Transmission power, kW
M	Inta	65°57′59.57″N 60°18′33.5″E			1200
W/1	Tumanny	69°3′8.4″N 35°40′14.3″E			
X/2	Pankratiev Island	76°7′34″N 60°12′55″E			250

=== GRI 5970 ===
#	Place	Coordinates	Emission delay, μs	Coding delay, μs	Transmission power, kW
M	Yuzhno-Uralsk	54°23.1′N 61°20.6′E			
W/1	Yekaterinburg	56°44.8′N 60°31.6′E	15895,1	15000	
X/2	Kurgan	55°22.2′N 65°22.6′E	30939,5	30000	

== See also ==
- LORAN, the Western counterpart of Chayka
- Alpha, the Russian counterpart of the Omega Navigation System, still in use as of November 2017.
- OMEGA, the Western counterpart of the Alpha Navigation System, no longer in use.
- Russian 460 metre radio mast
