= Kraskovo, Moscow Oblast =

Kraskovo Краско́во
- Urban-type settlement
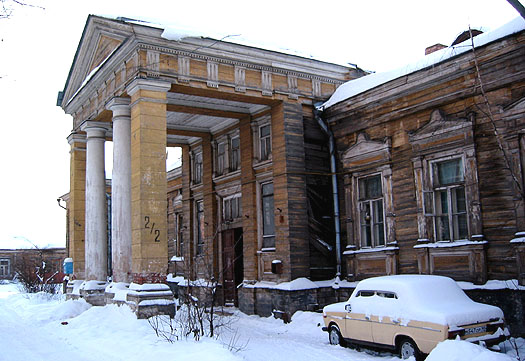
- The 19th-century manor house in 2004

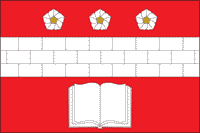
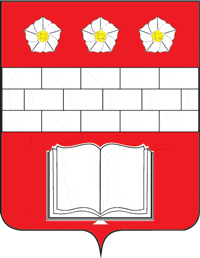
- Flag Coat of arms
- Interactive map of Kraskovo
- Location of Kraskovo Kraskovo (Moscow Oblast)
- Coordinates: 55°39′31″N 37°59′13″E
- Country: Russia
- Federal subject: Moscow Oblast
- Administrative district: Lyuberetsky District

Population (2010 Census)
  - Total: 21,250
  - Estimate (2025): 28,195 (+32.7%)
- Time zone: UTC+3 (MSK)
- Postal code: 140050
- OKTMO ID: 46631165051

Kraskovo (Russian: Краско́во) is an urban locality (a suburban (dacha) settlement) in Lyuberetsky District of Moscow Oblast, Russia. Population: 21,250 (2010 census); 11,930 (2002 census); 13,806 (1989 Soviet census). Its elevation is 421 meters (1,381 ft) above sea level. Dialing code: +7 495 (formerly +7 095).

== History ==
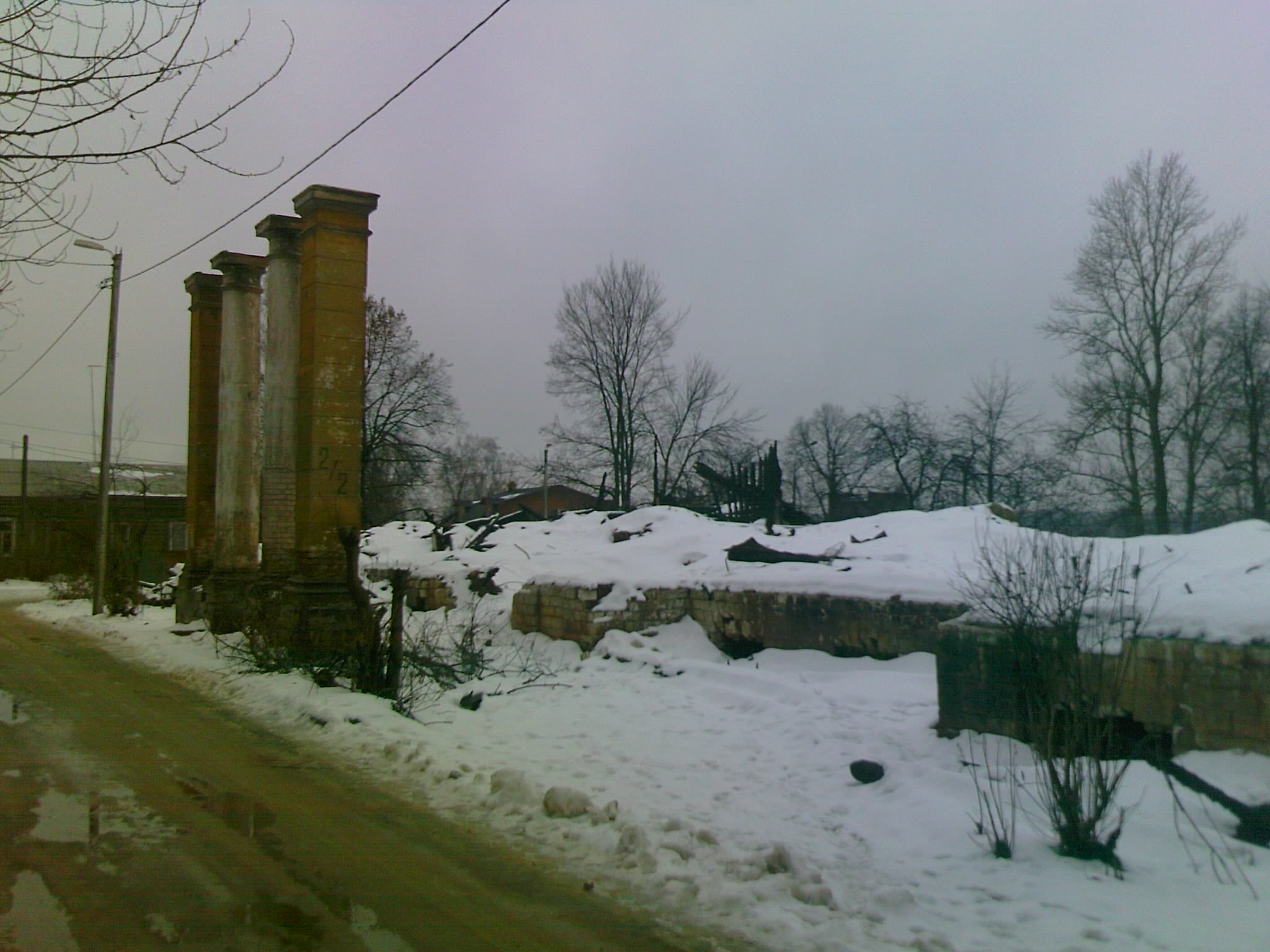
Ruins of the manor after the fire of 2011

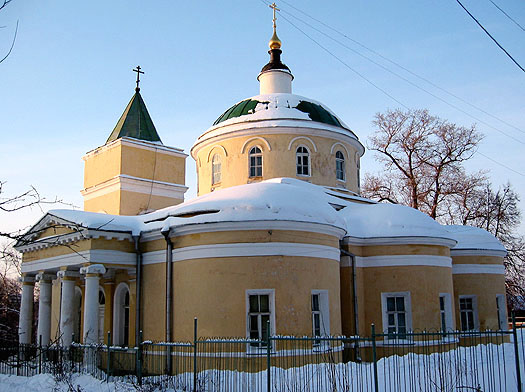
St. Vladimir Church

The first written references to Kraskovo date back to 1623. In 1861—1917 it was a part of the Vykhino Volost of the Moskovsky Uyezd of the Moscow Governorate. It is located on the Pekhorka River.

It was heavily damaged after the October Revolution of 1917—the park was deforested and most of its area was used for construction. The main house with its auxiliary wings and a church, household courtyard, and a crude kerb-stone fence still remains.

Another historic site of Kraskovo is the brick empire Vladimir church, constructed in 1831–1832.

In 1898, the first hospital opened, which is known today as Lyuberetsky District Hospital #1. There are also children and adult clinics and a veterinarian for domestic animals.

== Facilities ==
Children pre-schools and schools of general education, children intellectual development center, a stadium and a sporting school. State professional vocational training lyceum and Moscow artistic teacher's training college of technology and design.

== Government ==
The former Heads of the Local Government Board are Iskander Izmaylovich Badayev and Sergey Petrovich Bykov. On September 28, 2008, Sergey Bykov was removed from the candidate list for the October 12 elections by the court decision.
