= Chronometer =

Chronometer is a name for certain types of clock. It may refer to:

- Chronomètre of Loulié, a precursor to the metronome
- Chronometer watch, a highly accurate watch
- Marine chronometer, a timekeeper used for marine navigation, as in
  - Longitude by chronometer
- Observatory chronometer, a device certified by an observatory to be extremely accurate
- Railroad chronometer, a specialized timepiece once used for safe operation of trains

== See also ==
- Chronometry, the science of timekeeping
- Hydrochronometer, a water clock
- Chronograph
- Chronoscope
