= Celatone =

Navigational aid reliant on tracking Jupiter's moons in the sky

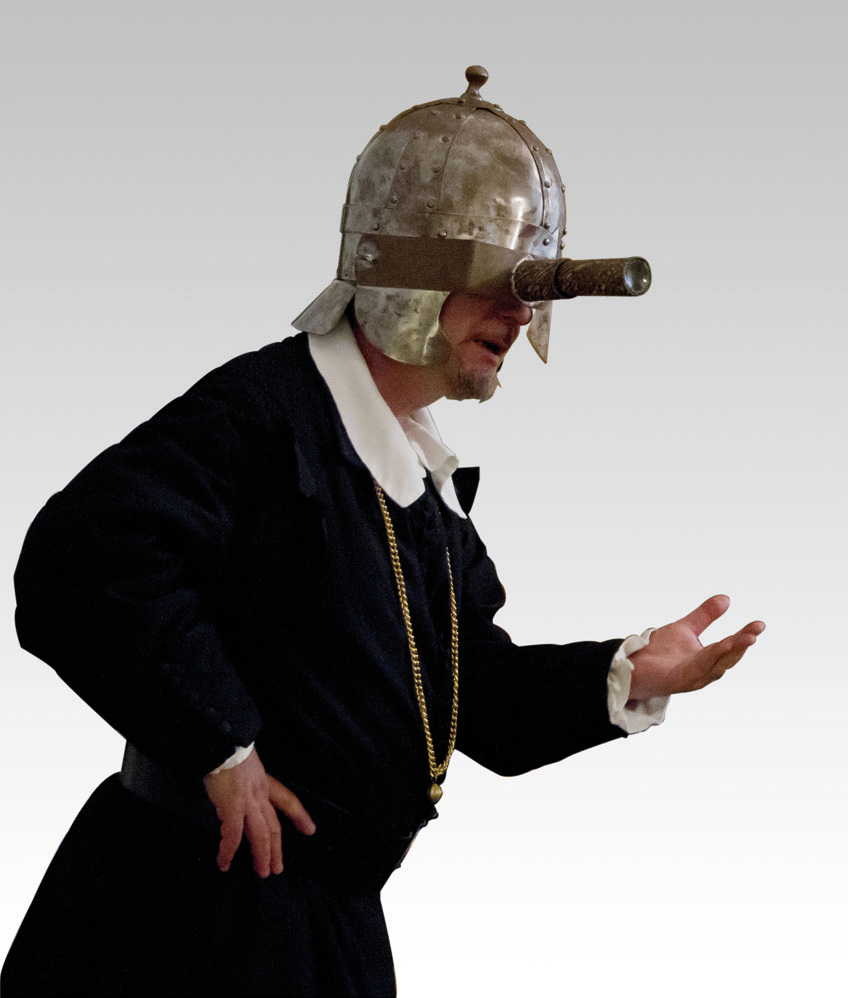
Using a celatone.

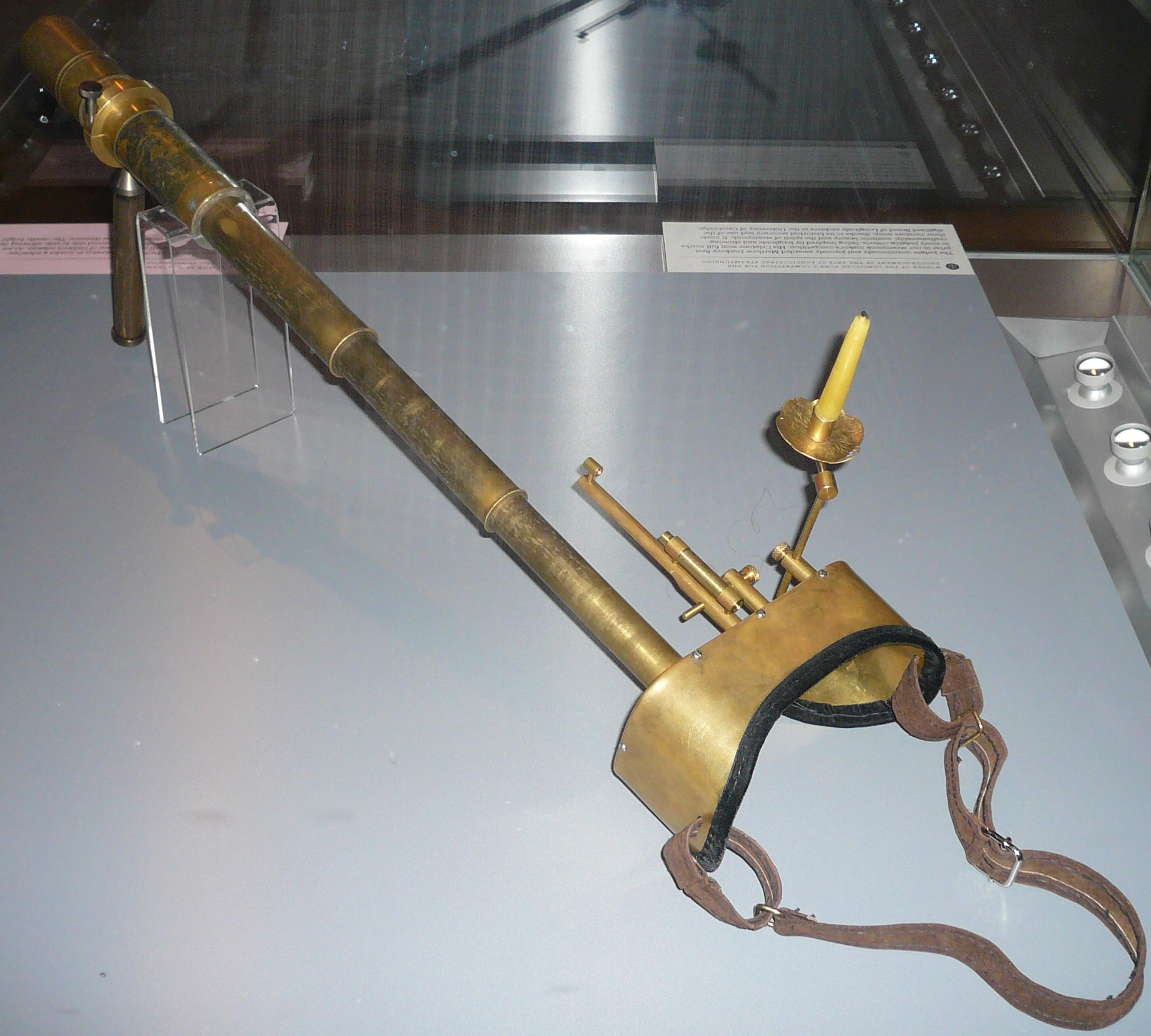
Celatone by Matthew Dockrey. Museum at the Royal Observatory, Greenwich, UK.

The celatone was a device invented by Galileo Galilei to observe Jupiter's moons with the purpose of finding longitude on Earth. It took the form of a piece of headgear with a telescope taking the place of an eyehole.

== Modern versions ==
In 2013, Matthew Dockrey created a replica celatone, using notes from a version created by Samuel Parlour. From April 2014 to January 2015, Dockrey's celatone was on display in the Royal Observatory, Greenwich in east London.

== See also ==
- Longitude prize
- Galilean moons
