= Kiyevsky suburban railway line =

Railway line in Russia

Kiyevsky Suburban Railway

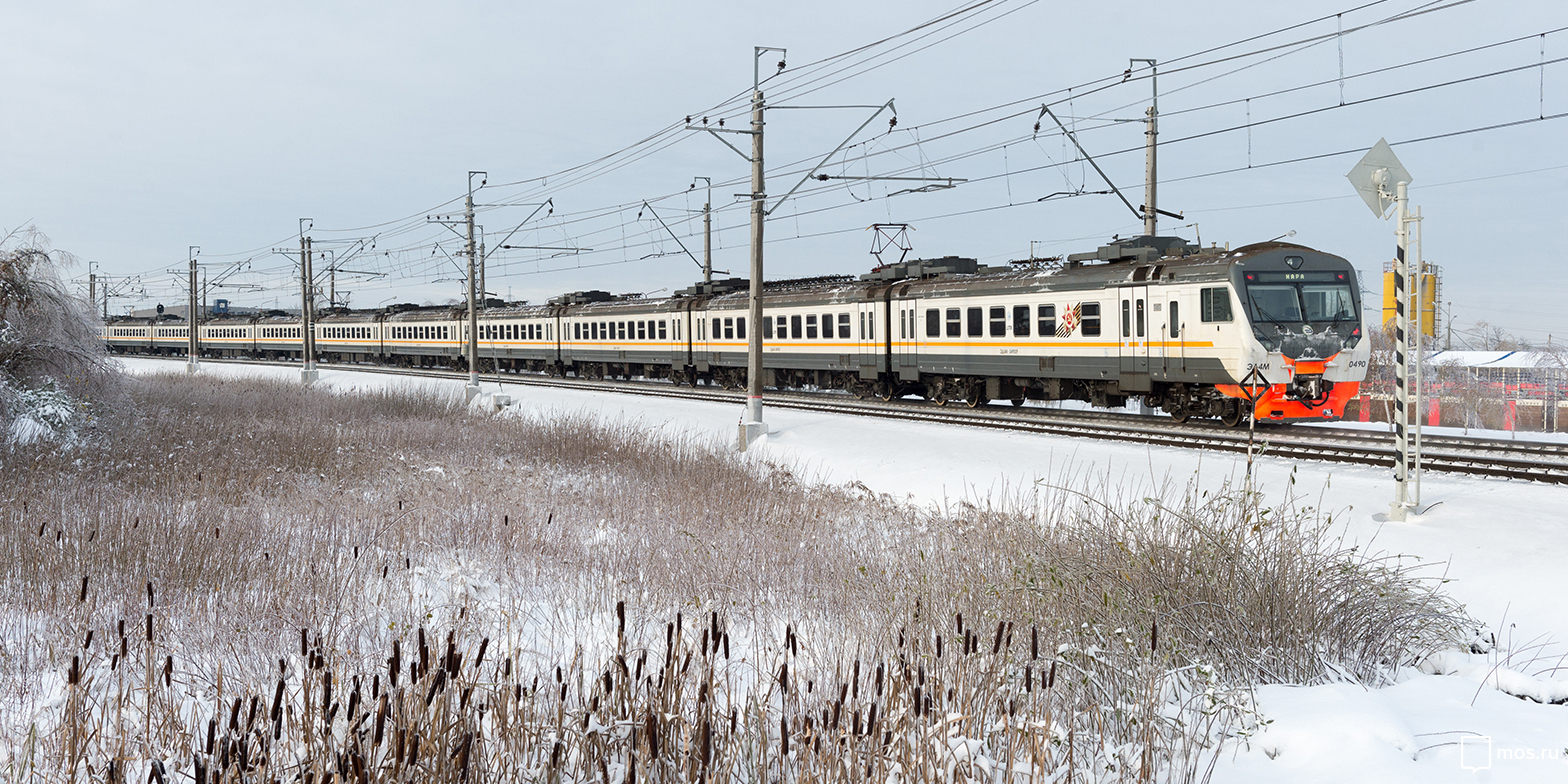
- CSPC ED4M traversing at the Kievskoye direction of Moscow Railway

Overview
- Native name: Киевское направление Московской железной дороги
- Owner: Russian Railways
- Locale: Moscow, Moscow Oblast and Kaluga Oblast
- Termini: Moscow Kiyevsky; Kaluga-2
- Stations: 50

Service
- Type: Commuter rail Inter-city rail Airport rail link
- System: Moscow Railway
- Operator(s): Central Suburban Passenger Company; Russian Railways

History
- Opened: 1899

Technical
- Number of tracks: 2; 4 (Moscow Kiyevsky-Aprelevka)
- Character: At-grade
- Track gauge: 1,520 mm (4 ft 11 27/32 in) Russian gauge
- Electrification: 3 kV DC overhead line

The Kiyevsky suburban railway line (Russian: Киевское направление Московской железной дороги) is one of eleven suburban lines used for suburban railway connections between Moscow, Russia, and surrounding areas in Moscow Oblast and Kaluga Oblast. The Kiyevsky suburban railway line connects central Moscow with the stations in the southwest, in particular, with the towns of Aprelevka, Naro-Fominsk, Balabanovo, Obninsk, Maloyaroslavets, and Kaluga as well as with the outlying, mostly rural Novomoskovsky and Troitsky administrative okrugs of Moscow.

The stations the line serves are located in Moscow, as well as in the towns of Odintsovo and Naro-Fominsk in Moscow Oblast, and in Borovsky and Maloyaroslavetsky Districts and the city of Kaluga of Kaluga Oblast. The suburban trains have their northeastern terminus at Moscow Kiyevsky railway station. In the southwestern direction, the suburban trains terminate at Solnechnaya, Novoperedelkino, Lesnoy Gorodok, Aprelevka, Bekasovo-1, Nara, Maloyaroslavets, Kaluga-1, and Kaluga-2. The section between Tikhonova Pustyn and Kaluga-1 follows the railway which proceeds further to Aleksin. The line is served by Moscow Railway.

The suburban railway line follows the railway which connects Moscow with Kyiv via Kaluga and Bryansk. It is electrified everywhere between Moscow and Kyiv. Between Moscow and Kaluga, there are two tracks. The tracks between Moscow and Aeroport are also used by Aeroexpress, which runs express trains to Vnukovo International Airport.

== History ==
The whole section between Moscow and Bryansk was constructed between 1895 and 1899 and became part of Moscow-Kiev-Voronezh Railway. The passenger traffic was opened in 1899 and initially consisted of two trains per day between Moscow and Bryansk. The terminal station building (until 1934 known as Bryansky Railway Station) was only opened in 1918. Before that, the section was served by a temporary building. The section between Moscow and Kaluga was gradually electrified in the 1950s.

== Stations ==
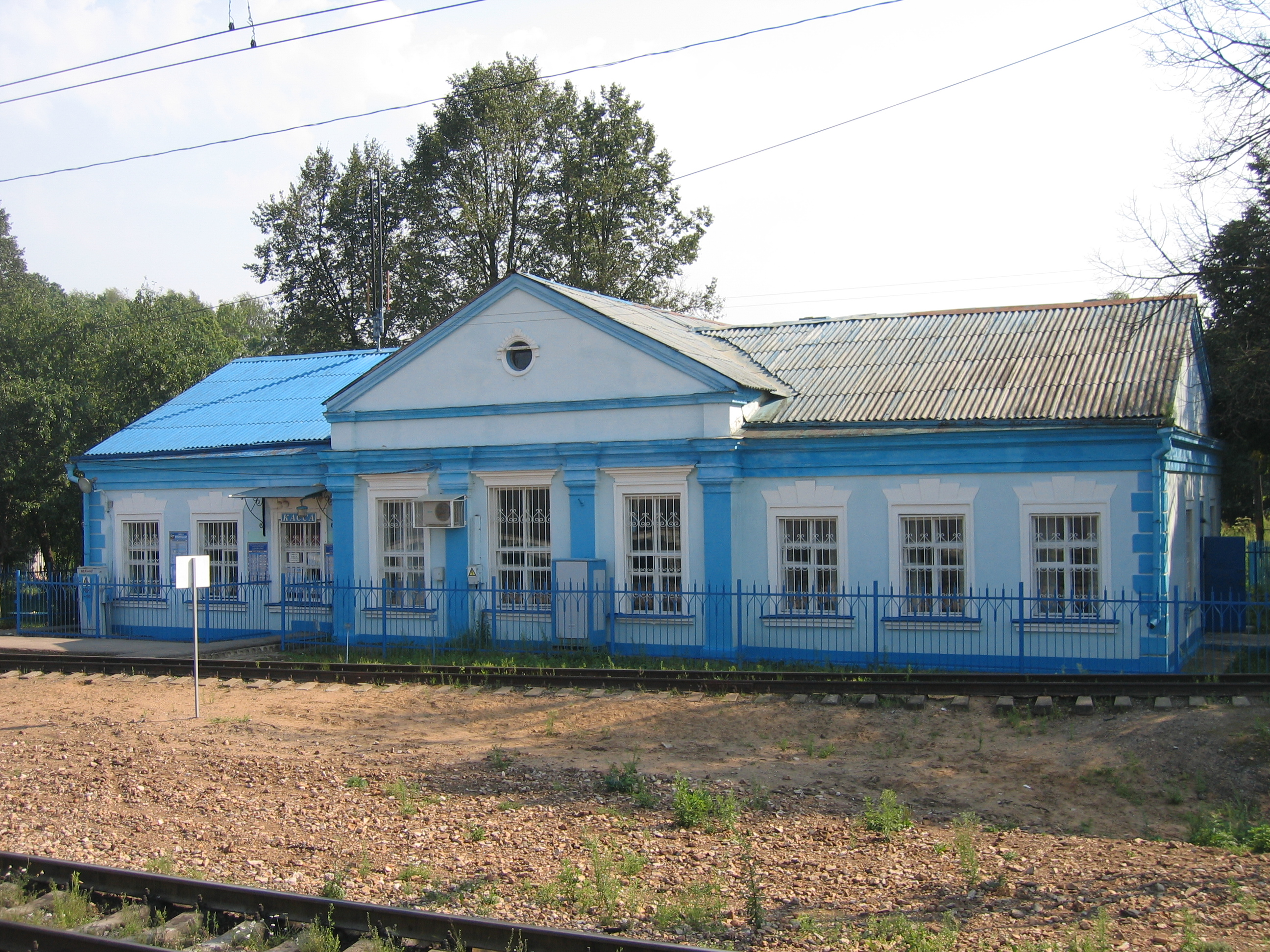
Shemyakino railway station

Following the standard notations in Russia, a railway stop below is called a station if it is a terminus or if it has a cargo terminal, and it is called a platform otherwise.

=== Moscow to Kaluga-2 ===
1. Moscow Kiyevsky railway station, transfer to Kiyevskaya (Arbatsko–Pokrovskaya line), Kiyevskaya (Filyovskaya line), and Kiyevskaya (Koltsevaya line) metro stations;
2. Poklonnaya (platform), transfer to Park Pobedy metro station;
3. Minskaya (platform), transfer to Minskaya metro station;
4. Matveyevskoye (platform);
5. Aminyevskaya (platform), transfer to Aminyevskaya metro station;
6. Ochakovo (station);
7. Meshchyorskaya (platform);
8. Solnechnaya (station);
9. Peredelkino (platform);
10. Michurinets (platform);
11. Vnukovo (platform);
12. Lesnoy Gorodok (station);
13. Tolstopaltsevo (platform);
14. Kokoshkino (platform);
15. Sanino (platform);
16. Kryokshino (station);
17. Pobeda (platform);
18. Aprelevka (station);
19. Dachnaya (platform);
20. Alabino (platform);
21. Selyatino (platform);
22. Rassudovo (platform);
23. Ozhigovo (platform);
24. Bekasovo-1 (station), connection to Greater Ring of the Moscow Railway;
25. Zosimova Pustyn (platform);
26. Nara (station);
27. Latyshskaya (station);
28. Bashkino (platform);
29. Vorsino (station);
30. Balabanovo (station);
31. Obninskoye (station);
32. Shemyakino (station);
33. Maloyaroslavets (station);
34. Yerdenevo (station);
35. 140 km (platform);
36. Sukhodrev (station);
37. Rodinka (platform);
38. Slyadnevo (station);
39. 167 km (platform);
40. Tikhonova Pustyn (station);
41. Gorenskaya (station);
42. Kaluga-2 (station).

=== Solnechnaya to Novoperedelkino ===
1. Solnechnaya (station);
2. Novoperedelkino (station).

=== Lesnoy Gorodok to Aeroport ===
1. Lesnoy Gorodok (station);
2. Aeroport (platform);
3. Aeroport (station), only served by Aeroexpress.

=== Tikhonova Pustyn to Kaluga-1 ===
1. Tikhonova Pustyn (station);
2. Muratovka (station);
3. Sadovaya (platform);
4. Azarovo (station);
5. Kaluga-1 (station).
