= Andrei Surikov =

Russian serial killer

- Born: Andrei Aleksandrovich Surikov; 2 April 1978 (age 48); Naro-Fominsk, Moscow Oblast, RSFSR
- Other names: "The Naro-Fominsk Maniac" "The Station Strangler"; Sergey Golikov
- Conviction: Insane
- Penalty: Involuntary commitment

Details
- Victims: 3
- Span of crimes: 18 May – 10 September 2008
- Country: Russia
- State: Moscow
- Date apprehended: April 2009

Andrei Aleksandrovich Surikov (Russian: Андрей Александрович Суриков; born 2 April 1978), known as The Naro-Fominsk Maniac (Russian: Наро-Фоминский маньяк), is a Russian serial killer who committed three murders in his hometown of Naro-Fominsk from May to September 2008. Claiming to have carried them on the orders of Lucifer, he was deemed as insane and interned at a mental institution.

== Early life ==
Andrei Aleksandrovich Surikov was born on 2 April 1978, in Naro-Fominsk. He was adopted at an early age by the Surikov family, with his stepfather being an influential businessman and his adopted mother working as a director of a meat processing plant. Surikov was well cared for by his adoptive parents, and by the age of 20, he got a job as an inspector for the traffic police. He eventually rose to the rank of junior sergeant, and according to his colleagues was a responsible and well-disciplined employee with remarkable physical strength who never took bribes.

== Crimes ==
=== Robbery and attempted murder ===
Sometime in 2001, while attending a party, Surikov met two men: Dmitry "Dima" Korotkov and Alexey "Lekha" Zagryadsky, both of whom had met in prison while serving terms for vandalism. The pair offered Surikov to join in on their latest scheme, which involved robbing people who drove expensive foreign cars. He agreed to help them and even arranged to buy a gun while on a "business trip" in Obninsk, Kaluga Oblast. However, the trio were deceived by the dealer and had their money stolen, and under the threat of death, were ordered to go away and never come back.

The trio soon abandoned this idea, and instead settled on stealing the car and selling it for parts. They eventually decided to stake out a section of the Borovskoye Highway and wait until a suitable victim passed by. By that time, Surikov had quit his job as a traffic inspector but still pretended to be one in order to stop motorists.

Eventually, he stopped Denis Yeltsov, a businessman from Smolensk driving an Audi A6 en route to Moscow, ostensibly because he was drunk. Surikov then said that he and his "colleague" would have to drive him to the nearby town of Aprelevka, but once they got inside, he and the accomplice attacked him - first by attempting to strangle him with a guitar string, then by stabbing him with a knife several times. Miraculously, Yeltsov managed to get out of the car and stop another motorist, screaming that a cop had just stabbed him. Later that same night, all three criminals were apprehended and charged with attempted murder and robbery after the police officers realized that they had gone to the crime scene in Surikov's own car without changing the license plate.

=== Charges and internment ===
When local media started reporting on the incident, they were ordered to use the pseudonym "Sergey Golikov" when referring to Surikov, in order to protect his identity. His involvement in the crime greatly puzzled both the authorities and the community alike - while Korotkov and Zadryadsky were known to engage in criminal behaviour, the participation of a relatively well-off traffic officer without any discernible motive seemed random. This was further exacerbated by some of his statements before the trial, with Surikov supposedly claiming that he wanted to get a wallet made out of human skin.

In the end, Korotkov and Zagryadsky were found to be sane, convicted and given long prison terms, but Surikov was deemed incompetent to stand trial and interned at a mental institution. There were allegations that he managed to avoid jail time due to his adopted father's influence, but these have never been substantiated.

== Release and murders ==
After spending a few years in a psychiatric facility, Surikov was "cured" and released. He then returned to Naro-Fominsk, where he soon developed an obsession with Satanism and occult literature. He also had a large collection of knives and edged weaponry and would regularly stab dolls in rituals, but his delusions eventually grew worse, leading him to search for living beings to kill.

=== Murders ===
Surikov's modus operandi consisted of attacking teenagers and young women in broad daylight, first choking them with a rope before stabbing them to death with a stiletto. After assuring himself that his victim was dead, he would then steal whatever caught his eye, ranging from the victim's shoes or watch, which he would sometimes give to his girlfriend. Additionally, he would leave one personal item belonging to a previous victim whenever he killed another one, as a sort of calling card.

On the afternoon of 18 May 2008, Surikov noticed 16-year-old Maria Veselova walking alongside some friends back to her parents' dacha. The Veselov family had arrived in Naro-Fominsk to celebrate her birthday and were planning to leave that same night. When the girl finally separated from her friends, Surikov caught up to her and killed her, leaving her body near the Latyshskaya Railway Station. The teenager's body was found on the following day.

On 21 June, Surikov was skulking around in the forest outside Naro-Fominsk when he came across 21-year-old Marina Karpenko, a university student who was en route to the local university. He stabbed her several times and then covered her body with branches. Her husband Aleksey, who had repeatedly offered to drive her to the university out of concern, later informed the authorities about his missing wife. A search party was organized, and Karpenko's body was found the following morning.

In early September, Surikov stalked 20-year-old Olga Parokhina, a nurse who worked at the Orbita nursing home. On 10 September, while Parokhina was working during her vacation for extra income, Surikov snuck into the building and burst into the treatment room, where he stabbed her to death. He then dragged the body by the hair to an adjacent bathroom and placed it in the bathtub, where it was discovered by staff on the following day.

== Arrest, trial, and internment ==
In April 2009, Surikov, donning a mask and armed with a knife, attempted to rob a grocery store in the village of Petrovskoye, but only managed to steal 250 rubles. This act was noticed by a group of young villagers who immediately rushed after him, eventually capturing the robber while he was attempting to start up his car. Whilst they were dragging him to the police station, Surikov started shouting that "[he] didn't rob anyone and [he] didn't kill anyone." Coincidentally, he was arrested on the same day that an episode of "Battle of the Psychics" (Russian: Битве экстрасенсов), a TV show about purported psychics, was being filmed on the location where Parokhina had been murdered - coincidentally, some of the contestants' predictions about the case would align almost perfectly with what Surikov would confess to.

Soon afterwards, police searched his apartment, finding personal items that belonged to the murder victims, including Karpenko's watch, which had Surikov's fingerprints on it. When questioned, he admitted his guilt in the crimes, but claimed that Lucifer had ordered him to kill the women.

Surikov was charged with murder of three people and robbery, and brought to trial in 2010. He expressed no interest in any of the proceedings, appearing to be either bored or emotionless most of the time. An ex-girlfriend testified that he had attempted to convince her to form a false alibi for him, while a friend claimed that whenever Surikov decided to speak, it was always about the Devil or how much he hated the church.

As part of the proceedings, Surikov was ordered to undergo a psychiatric evaluation at the Serbsky Center in Moscow. The four psychiatrists who examined him concluded that he had schizophrenia and was extremely aggressive, but that he should not be considered criminally liable for his actions. Due to this, Surikov was deemed to be incompetent to stand trial and imprisoned at a psychiatric facility. This decision was initially opposed by some of the victims' family members who believed that he had simply deceived the courts, but they eventually decided not to appeal the verdict.

== In media and culture ==
Surikov's case was covered on an episode of Investigation Committee (Russian: Следственный комитет), titled "The Station Strangler" (Russian: Станционный душитель) and released in 2012. In the episode, it is stated that Surikov hanged himself sometime after being interned, but this has not been substantiated with certainty.

An episode of "The investigation was conducted... with Leonid Kanevsky" (Russian: Следствие вели... с Леонидом Каневским) named "Italian Blade" (Russian: Итальянский клинок) was loosely based on the Surikov case.

== See also ==
- List of Russian serial killers
