= Pobeda railway station =

Railway station in Moscow, Russia

Pobeda Победа
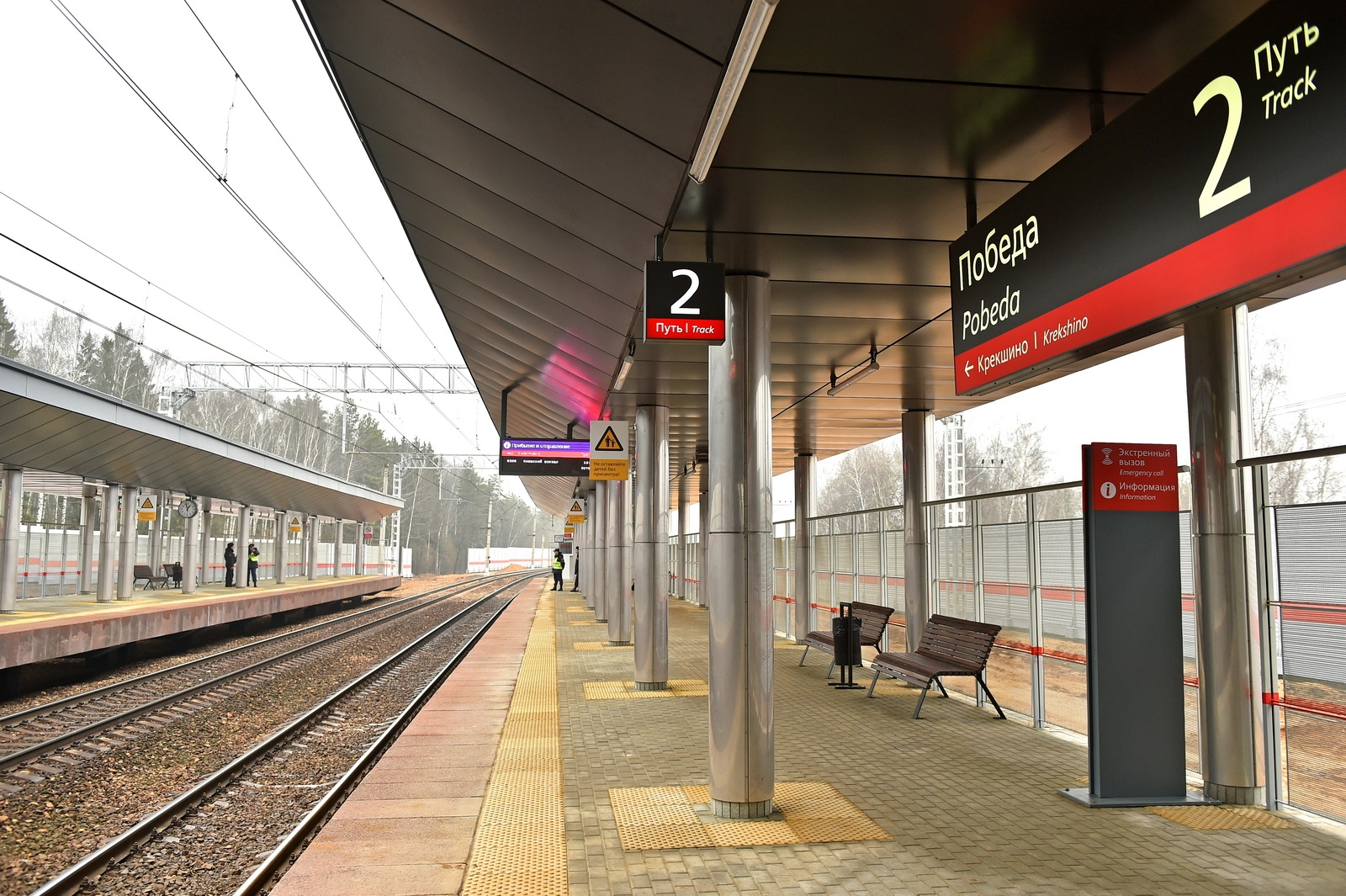

General information
- Location: Moscow Oblast; Russia
- Coordinates: 55.5662°N 37.0928°E
- System: Moscow Railway platform
- Owner: Russian Railways
- Operator: Moscow Railway
- Platforms: 2 (Island platform)
- Tracks: 3

Construction
- Structure type: At-grade

History
- Opened: 1951
- Rebuilt: 2020

Services
Preceding station	Russian Railways	Following station
Kryokshino towards Moscow Kiyevsky	Kiyevsky Suburban	Aprelevka towards Kaluga-2
Proposed
Preceding station	Moscow Central Diameters	Following station
Kryokshino towards Zheleznodorozhnaya	Line D4	Aprelevka Terminus
Location

Pobeda (Russian: Победа, lit. Victory) is a railway station of Kiyevsky suburban railway line in Naro-Fominsky District of Moscow Oblast. It was opened in 1951 and rebuilt in 2020.

== Gallery ==
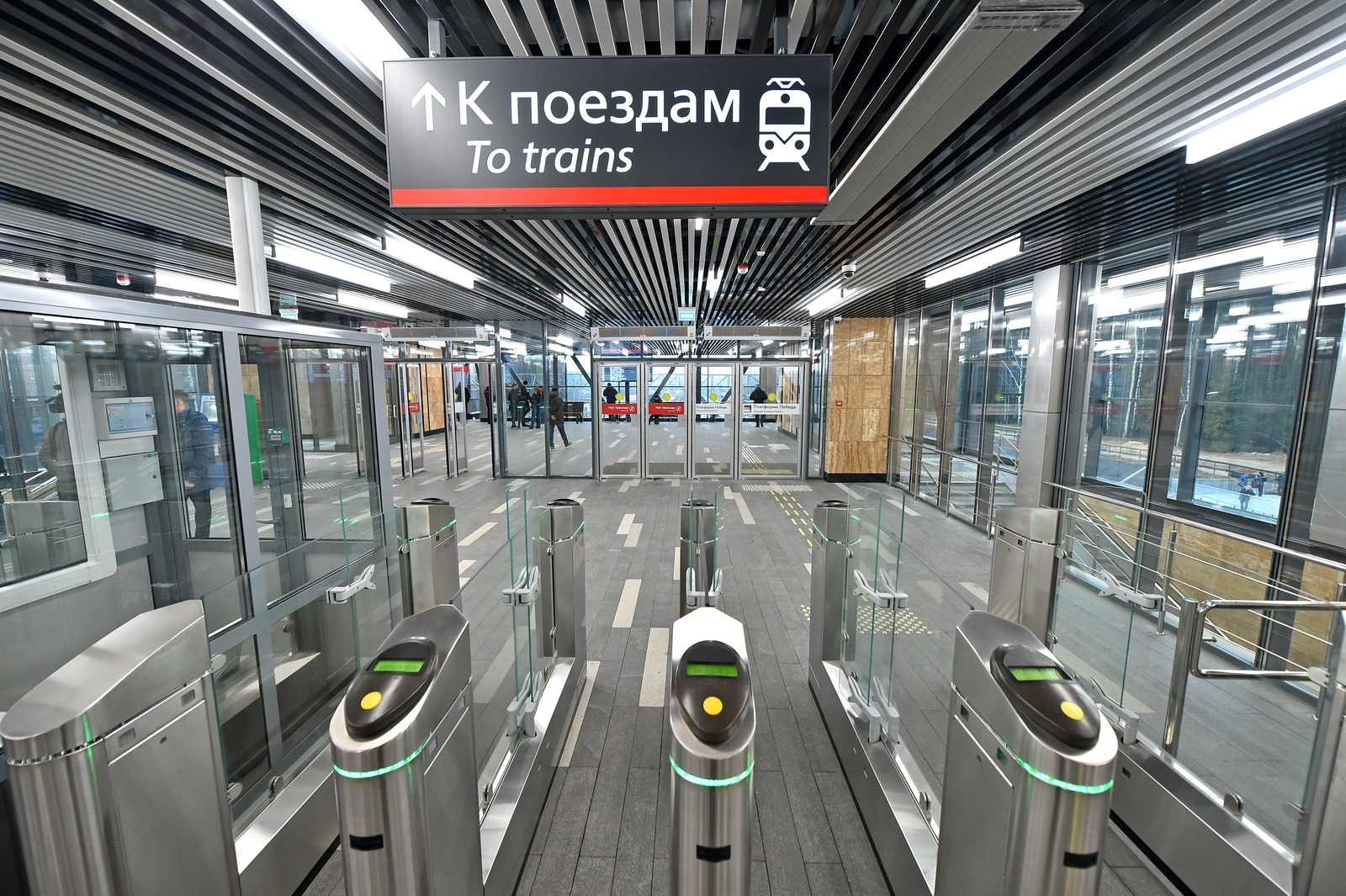

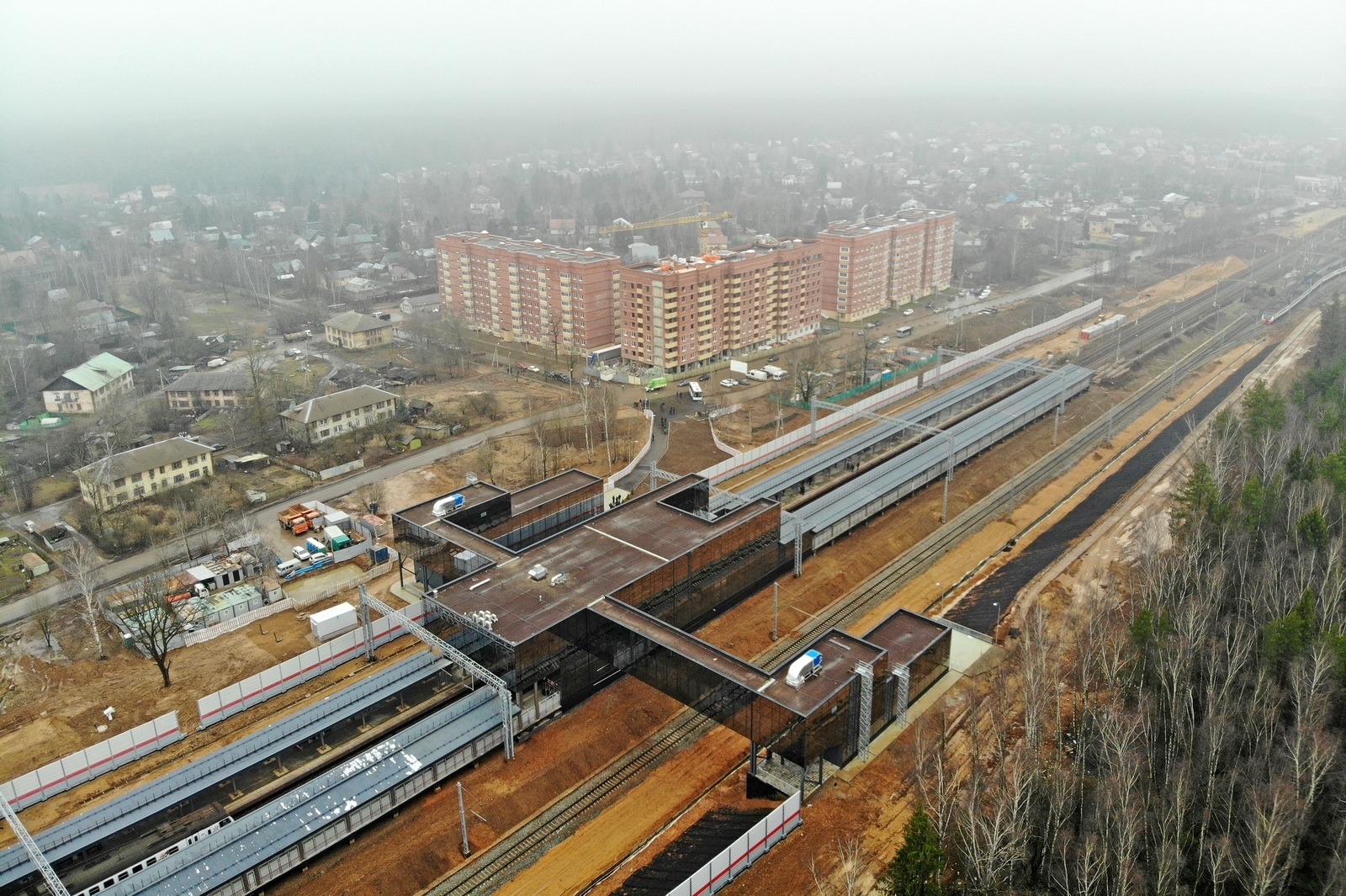

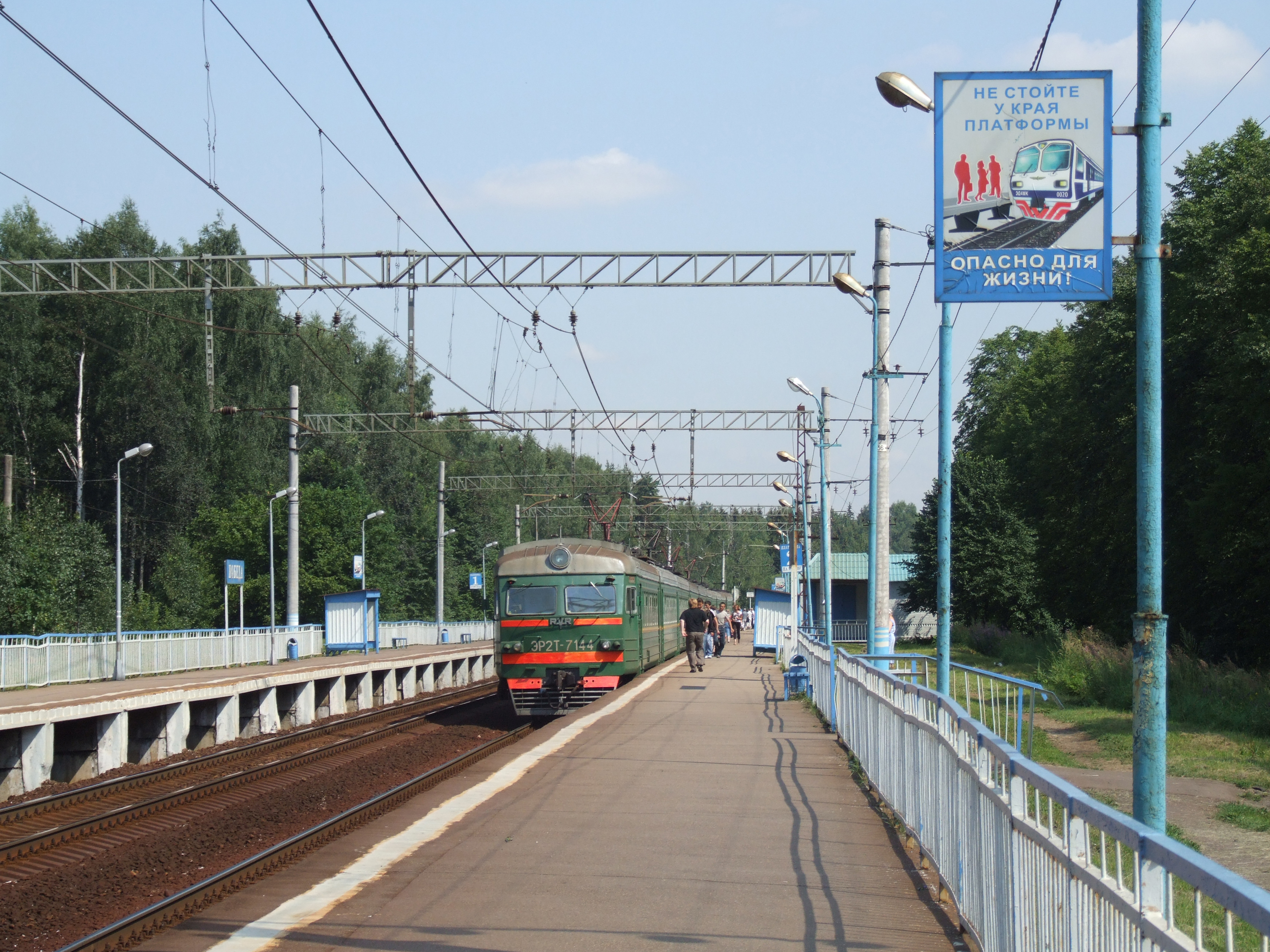
Pobeda railway station in 2008
