= Gécamines Building =

Office tower in Gombe, Kinshasa

- Former names: Sozacom Building; Sozacom Tower

General information
- Type: Office building
- Architectural style: Neo-Art Deco and Postmodern
- Location: Boulevard du 30 Juin, Gombe, Kinshasa, Democratic Republic of the Congo
- Year built: 1969–1977
- Construction started: 1969; 57 years ago
- Completed: 1977; 49 years ago
- Owner: Gécamines

Technical details
- Floor count: 19, 23 or 25 (sources differ)

Design and construction
- Architects: Claude Strebelle; Atelier d'architecture de Genval
- Architecture firm: Atelier d'architecture de Genval
- Main contractor: SAFRICAS

The Gécamines Building (French: Immeuble Gécamines), formerly known as the Sozacom Building or Sozacom Tower, is a high-rise office building on Boulevard du 30 Juin in Gombe, Kinshasa, Democratic Republic of the Congo. It was built by Congolese construction company SAFRICAS between 1969 and 1977 during Mobutu Sese Seko's presidency to a design by Belgian architect Claude Strebelle in partnership with André Jacqmain's Atelier d'Architecture de Genval. Its copper-colored finish and sculptural design were meant to symbolize the country's mineral wealth. Although named after Gécamines, it remains widely known by the name of its former occupant, the Société zaïroise de commercialisation des minerais (SOZACOM), which handled mineral marketing for the state.

== History ==
=== Construction and early use ===
The tower's development formed part of the building boom in Kinshasa under President Mobutu Sese Seko, as it followed his government's 1966 requirement that companies operating in the country maintain offices in the capital. The Bakajika Law also cancelled mining and land concessions granted before independence. A main target was the Union Minière du Haut-Katanga (UMHK), which was believed to have financed the Katangan secession of 1960–1963. UMHK was later nationalized, while the Société générale des minerais (SGM) became involved in managing and marketing the successor company's production.

SGM commissioned Claude Strebelle, who had designed the European School (Athénée Royale), the Municipal Theatre in Élisabethville (now Lubumbashi), and other buildings in eastern Congo. Strebelle collaborated with André Jacqmain's Atelier d'Architecture de Genval. Construction ran from 1969 to 1977 and was carried out by SAFRICAS. The 25-story building, with copper-colored tiles on its exterior, covers 30,000 square meter and stands on Boulevard du 30 Juin.

SOZACOM occupied the tower, which also became home to Gécamines' Kinshasa representative office. Its other occupants included institutions, private tenants and the USAID mission. Although the tower later became known as the Gécamines Building, the Sozacom name remained widely used.

On 23 June 2016, an eleventh-floor apartment caught fire. Firefighters, assisted by Gécamines employees, brought the blaze under control in about an hour. There were no reported deaths, but the fire destroyed belongings in the apartment. News coverage described problems with the lifts and smoke spreading as far as the ground floor. By June 2018, the tower had more than fifty tenants, including state-owned businesses, ministerial offices and private individuals.

=== Renovation ===
In June 2018, tenants received notice to vacate to allow Gécamines to renovate the building and update its facilities. SIMCO, the company managing the property, later sought contractors for work on the seventh and eighth floors. This included television and video-surveillance systems.

View of the Gécamines Building on Boulevard du 30 Juin

In July 2025, Ouragan.cd reported that the work was continuing. Plans called for two elevators, a pump to supply drinking water, a generator, firefighting equipment and floor-slab waterproofing materials. However, Ouragan.cd noted that details about the companies awarded contracts and the costs had not been made public.

== Architecture ==
Art Deco influences appear throughout the tower's design, particularly in its large, projecting forms. In her book Congo Style: From Belgian Art Nouveau to African Independence, Ruth Sacks describes it as Neo-Art Deco/postmodern. She explains that its copper-colored exterior and mountain-like proportions were meant to reflect Zaire's mineral resources. Strebelle and Jacqmain used the building's sculptural shape to convey a sense of African modernity.

The entrance leads into an oval hall with a shell-like spiral ceiling and elevators finished in bronze and wood. According to Sacks, parking reaches six levels below ground, while an on-site engineering team maintains the generator system. She also emphasizes the tower's size and height, noting that it can be seen from Brazzaville on the opposite bank of the Congo River. Its floor count remains unclear, with different accounts describing 19, 23 or 25 stories.
