= Michurinets railway station =

Railway station in Moscow, Russia

Michurinets Мичуринец
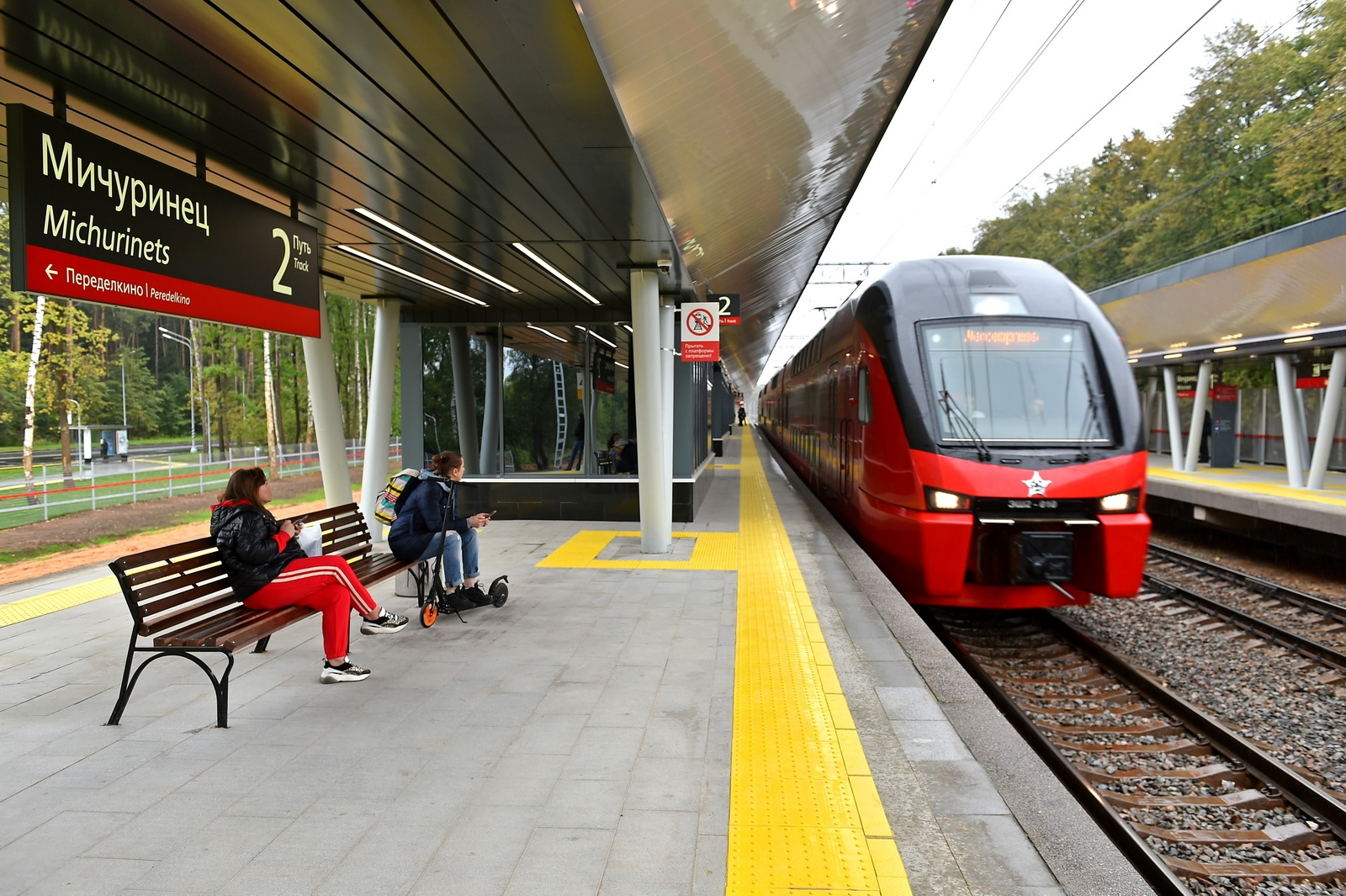
- Michurinets railway station in 2020

General information
- Location: Vnukovskoye Settlement, NAO; Moscow; Russia
- Coordinates: 55.6462°N 37.3150°E
- System: Moscow Railway platform
- Owner: Russian Railways
- Operator: Moscow Railway
- Platforms: 2 (Side platform)
- Tracks: 2

Construction
- Structure type: At-grade

History
- Opened: 1949

Services
Preceding station	Russian Railways	Following station
Peredelkino towards Moscow Kiyevsky	Kiyevsky Suburban	Vnukovo towards Kaluga-2
Proposed
Preceding station	Moscow Central Diameters	Following station
Peredelkino towards Zheleznodorozhnaya	Line D4	Vnukovo towards Aprelevka
Location

Michurinets is a railway station of Kiyevsky suburban railway line in Vnukovskoye Settlement of Moscow. It was opened in 1949 and was rebuilt in 2020. The station is named after nearly located dacha cooperative, which name is commemorating Russian botanist Ivan Michurin.

== Gallery ==
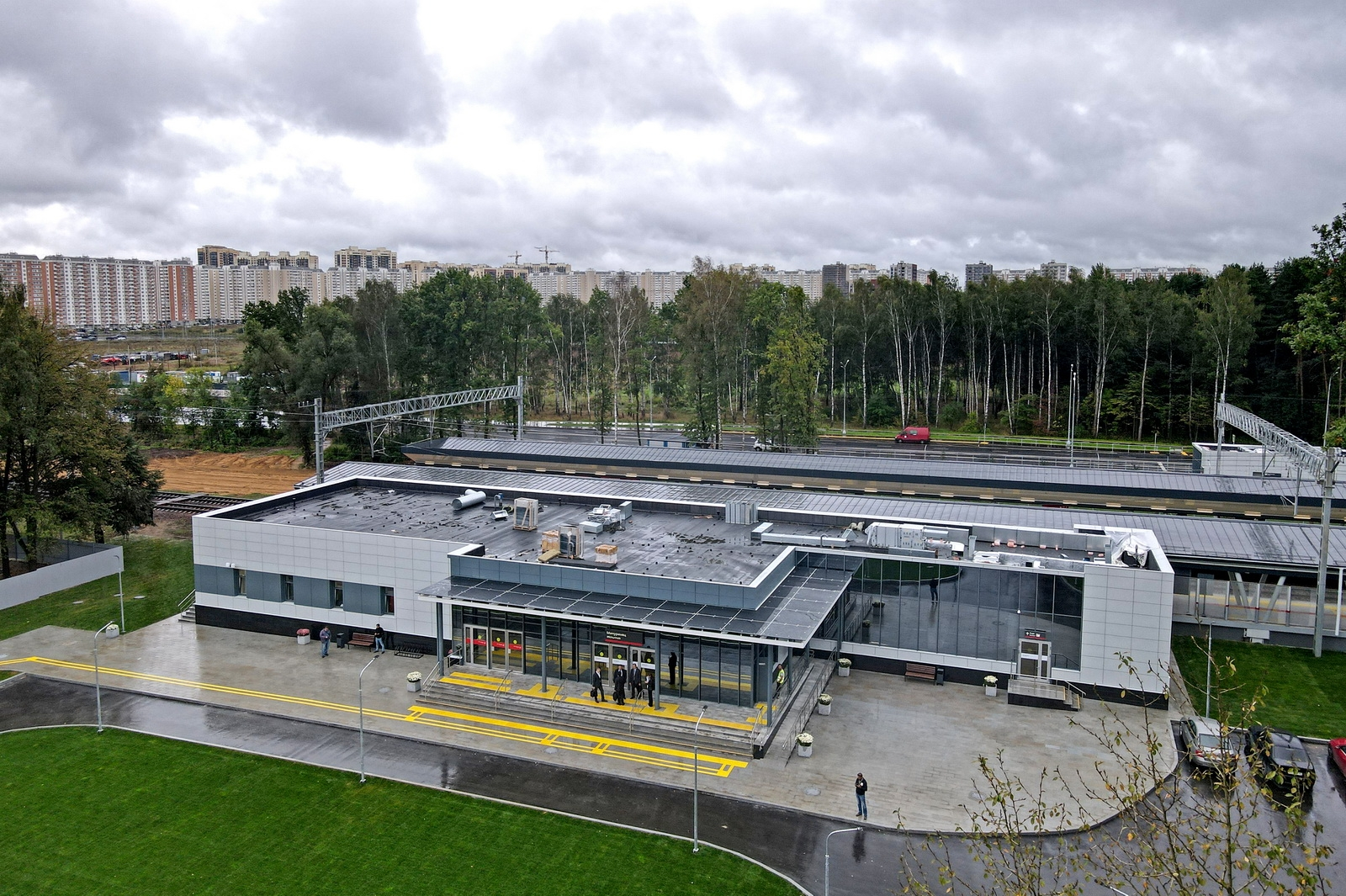

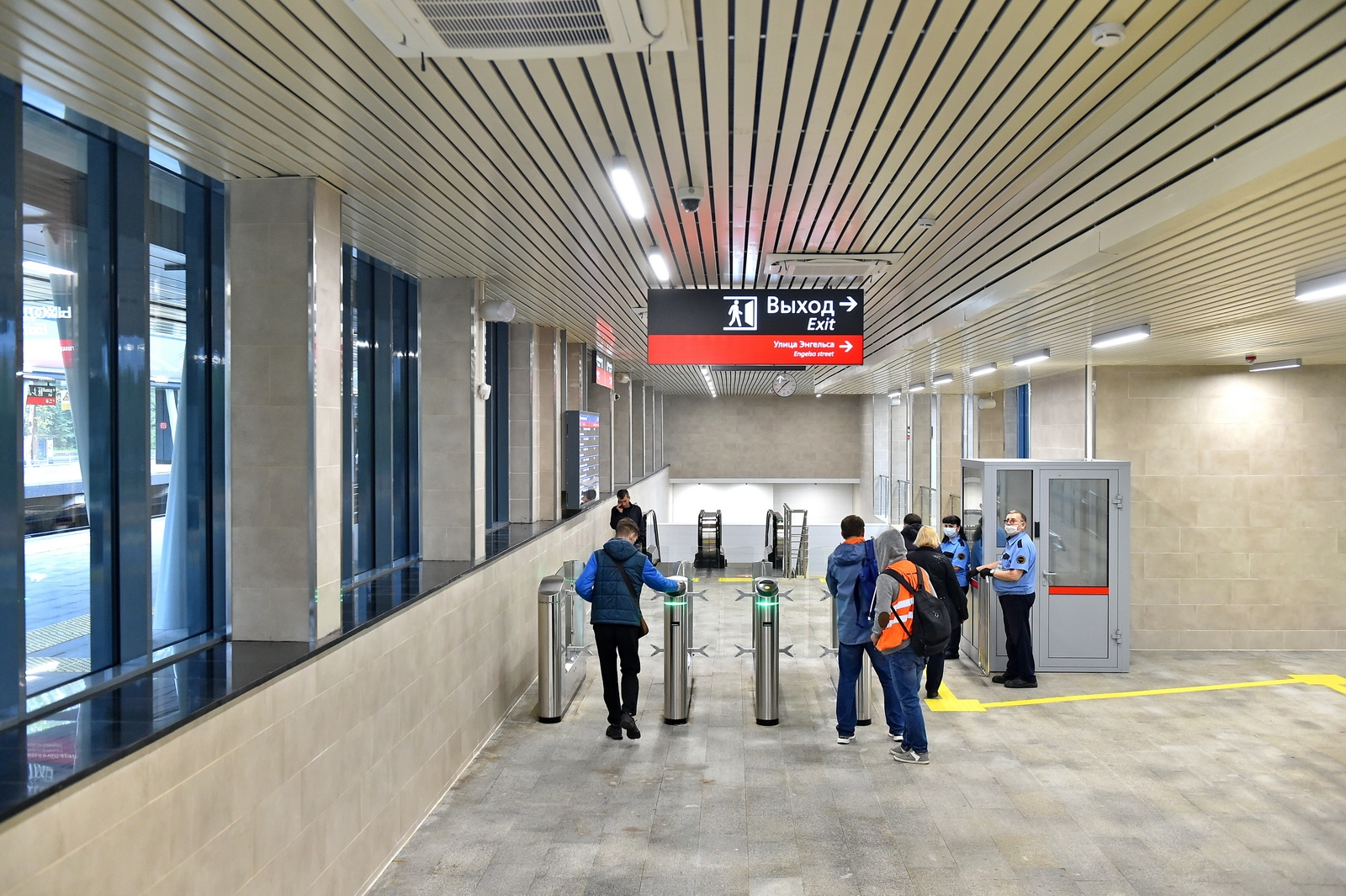

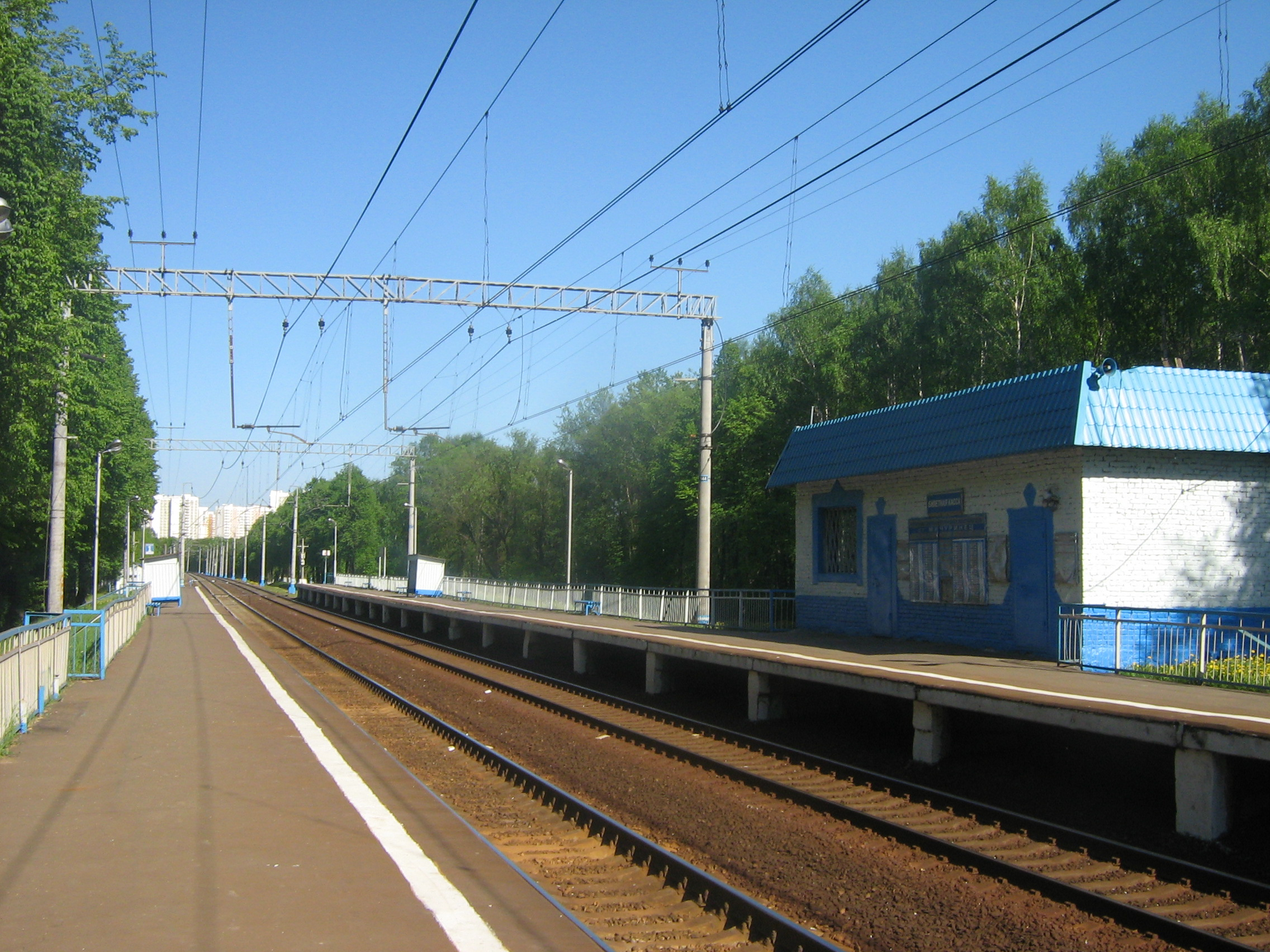
The old railway station in 2007.
