= European Square =

European Square may refer to:

- European Square, Kyiv, a square in Kyiv
- Square of Europe, a square in Moscow
- Plaza de Europa, a square in Barcelona
- European Square, Boryspil, a square in Boryspil
- European Square, Vinnytsia, a square Vinnytsia
- European Square, Dnipro, a square in Dnipro
- European Square, Konotop, a square in Konotop
- European Square, Odesa, a square in Odesa
- European Square, Zagreb, a square in Zagreb
- European Square, Tbilisi, a square in Tbilisi
- European Square, Batumi, a square in Batumi
- European Square, Tyumen, a square in Tyumen
- European Square, Ulyanovsk, a square in Ulyanovsk

== See also ==
- Category:Squares in Europe
