= Meshchyorskaya railway station =

Railway station in Moscow, Russia

Meshchyorskaya Мещёрская
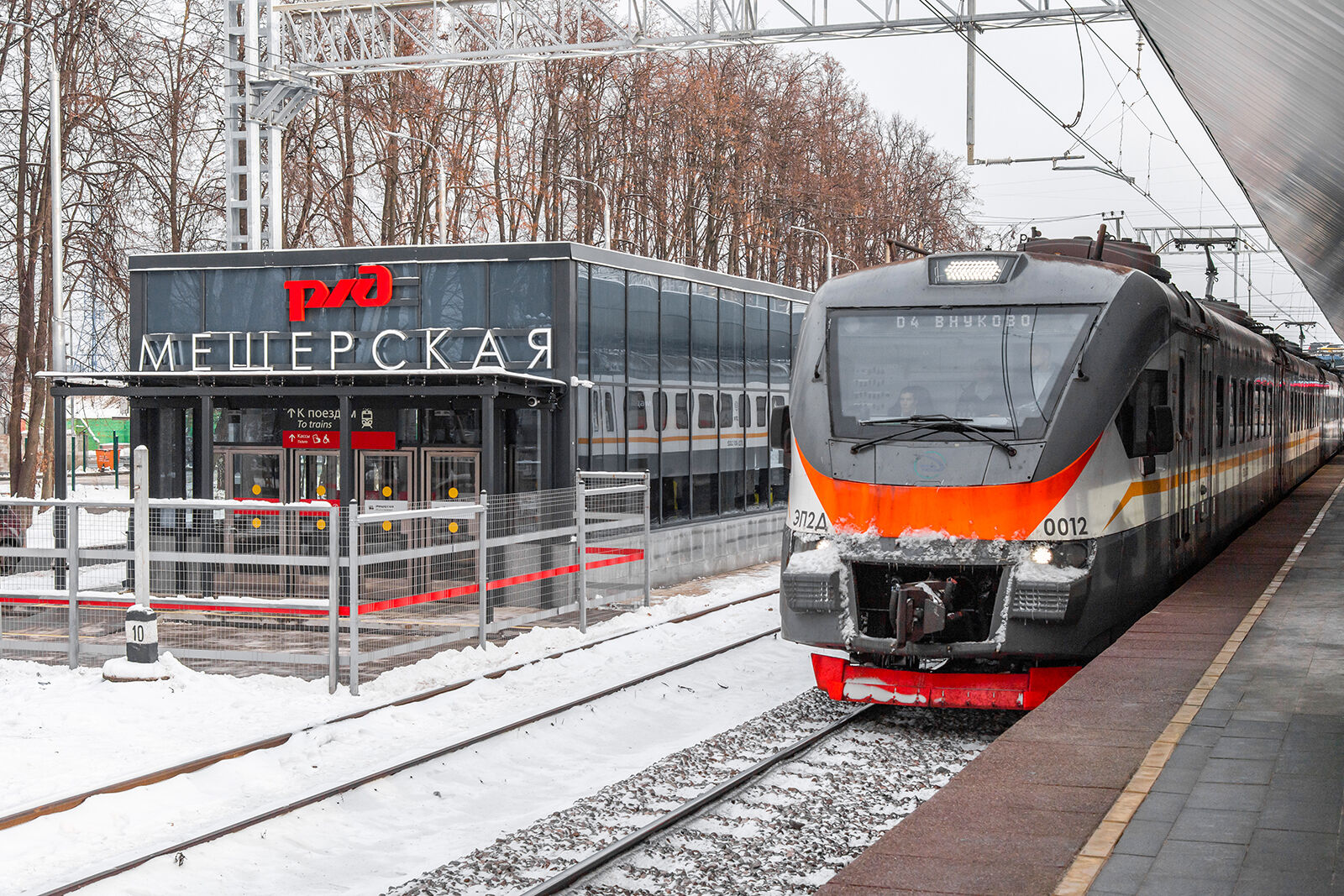
- Meshchyorskaya railway station in 2018

General information
- Location: Moscow Oblast; Russia
- Coordinates: 55.6667°N 37.4246°E
- System: Moscow Railway platform
- Owner: Russian Railways
- Operator: Moscow Railway
- Platforms: 2
- Tracks: 3

Construction
- Structure type: At-grade

History
- Opened: 1899

Services
Preceding station	Russian Railways	Following station
Ochakovo towards Moscow Kiyevsky	Kiyevsky Suburban	Solnechnaya towards Kaluga-2
Preceding station	Moscow Central Diameters	Following station
Proposed
Ochakovo towards Zheleznodorozhnaya	Line D4	Solnechnaya towards Aprelevka
Location

Meshchyorskaya, formerly Skolkovo and Vostryakovo, is a railway station of Kiyevsky suburban railway line in Western Administrative Okrug of Moscow. It was opened in 1899 and will be rebuilt.

== Gallery ==
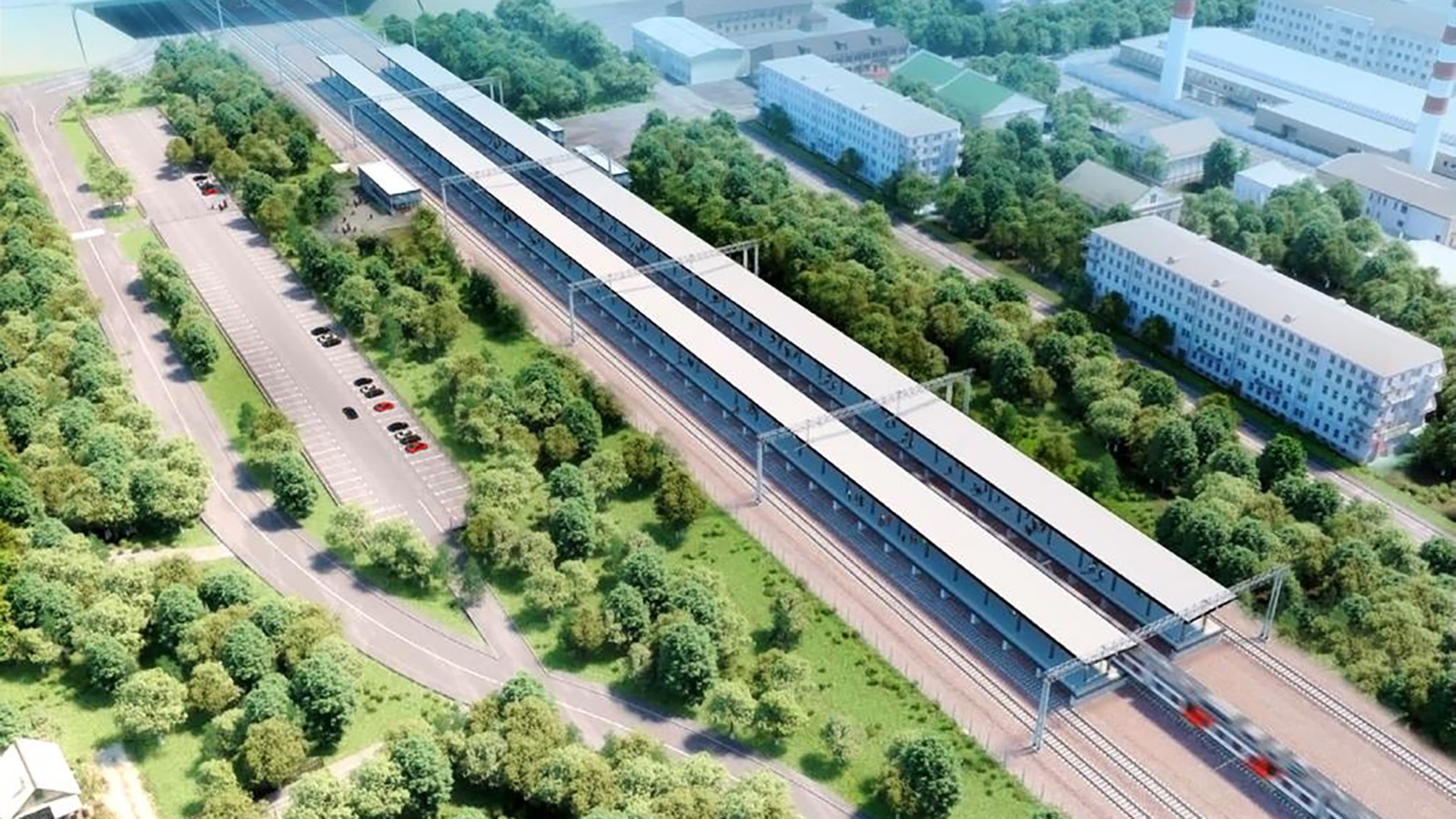
The project of a new station.

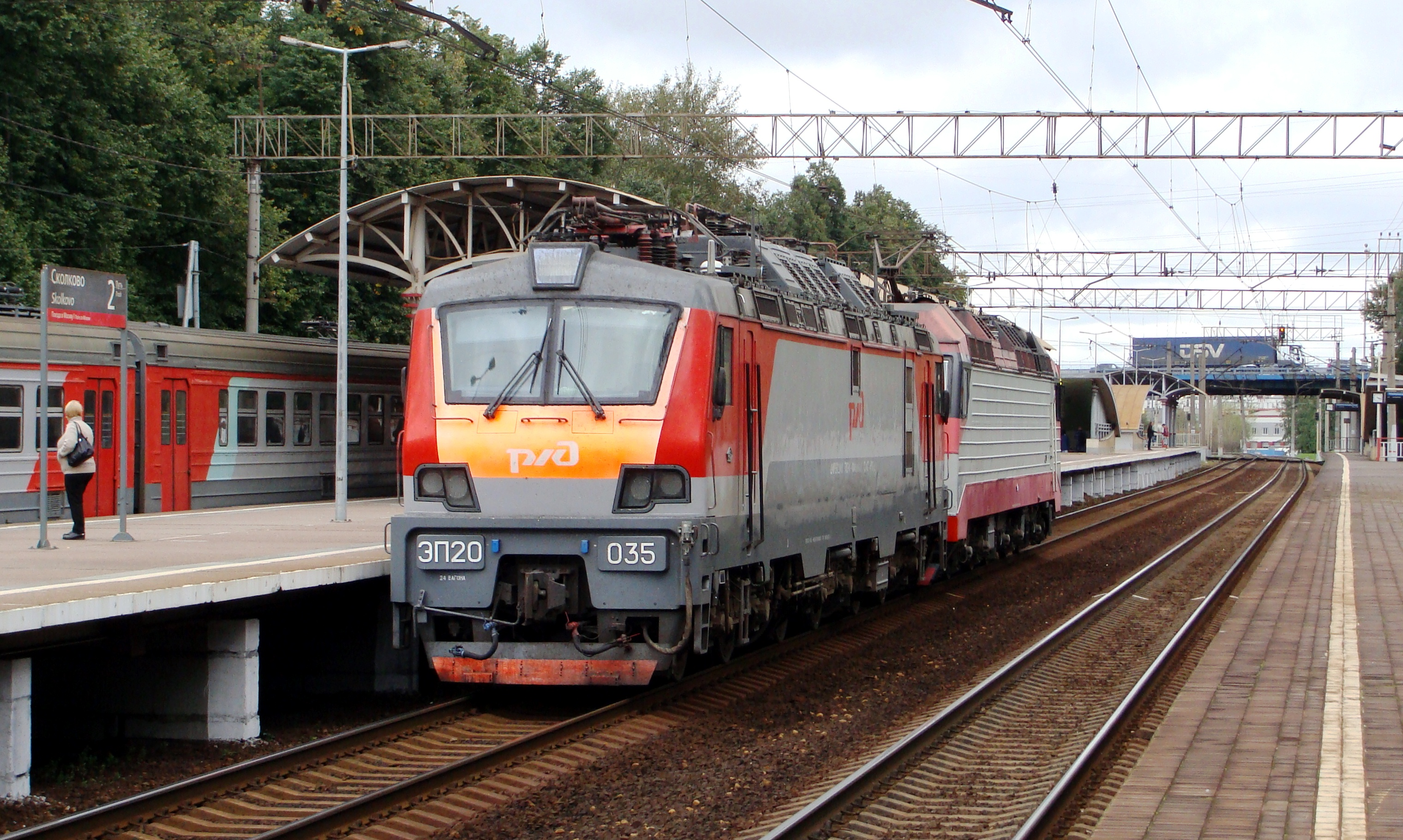
