= Claude Strebelle =

Belgian architect

- Born: 2 November 1917; Brussels, Belgium
- Died: 16 November 2010 (aged 93); Liège, Belgium
- Father: Rodolphe Strebelle
- Relatives: Olivier Strebelle (brother)

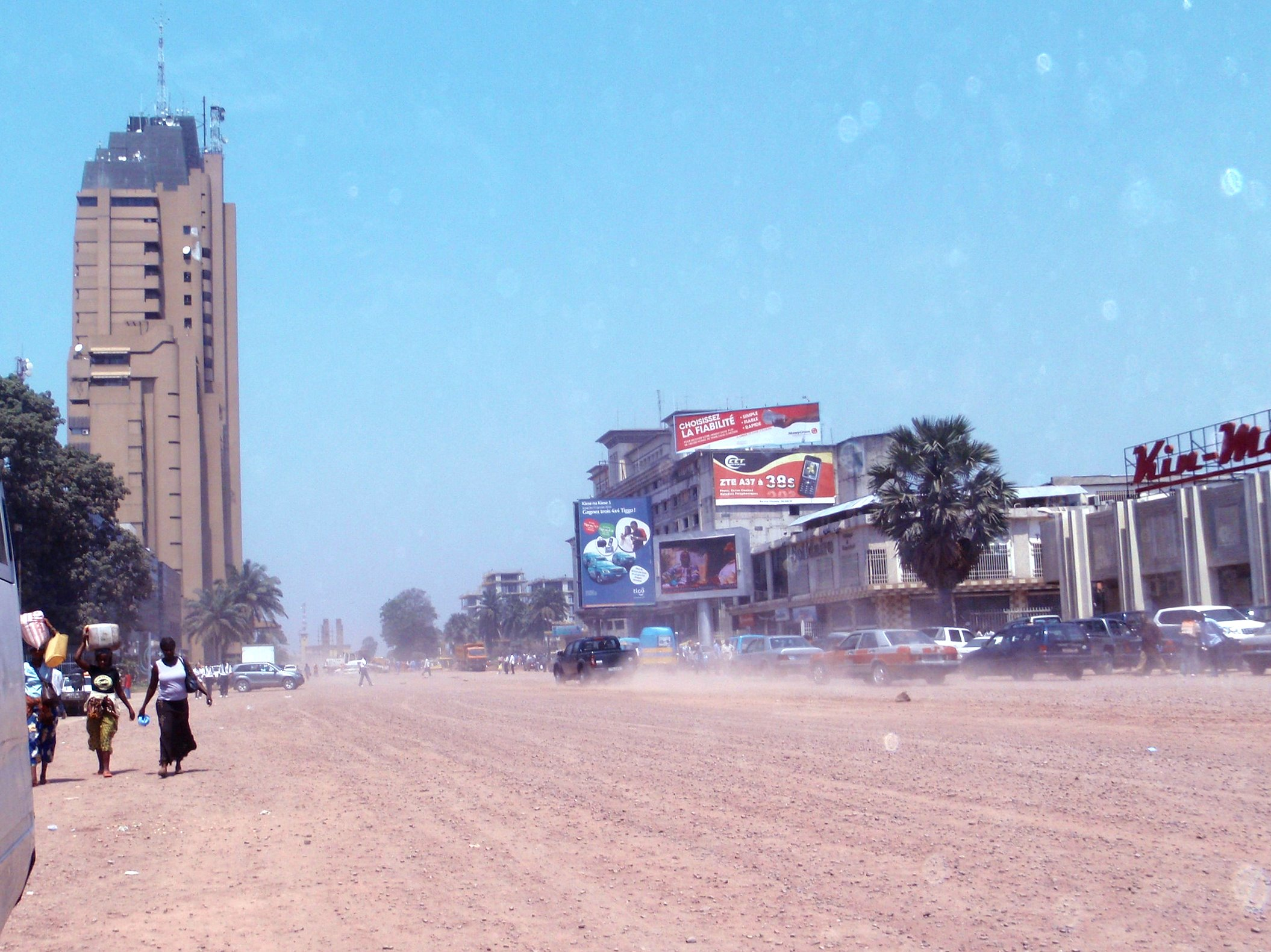
Ex-Sozacom-building (left), by Claude Strebelle, in Kinshasa, Democratic Republic of the Congo

Claude Strebelle (2 February 1917, Brussels – 16 November 2010, Liège) was an architect and Belgian town planner, graduate of the Académie Royale des Beaux-Arts in Brussels in 1941.

== Biography ==
Based in Tilff, in the Liège region, Claude Strebelle founded Sart Tilman workshop, an important architectural office.

In 1946, he created a phalanstery with his brothers Jean-Marie Strebelle and Olivier Strebelle, as well as the painter Carlo de Brouckère in a castle in Torhout. Belgian architect André Jacqmain, sculptor Aroldo Zavaroni and the ceramist Théo Kisselov took part in this project.
