= Olivier Strebelle =

Belgian sculptor (1927–2017)

Coordinates: 40°0′49″N 116°22′22″E

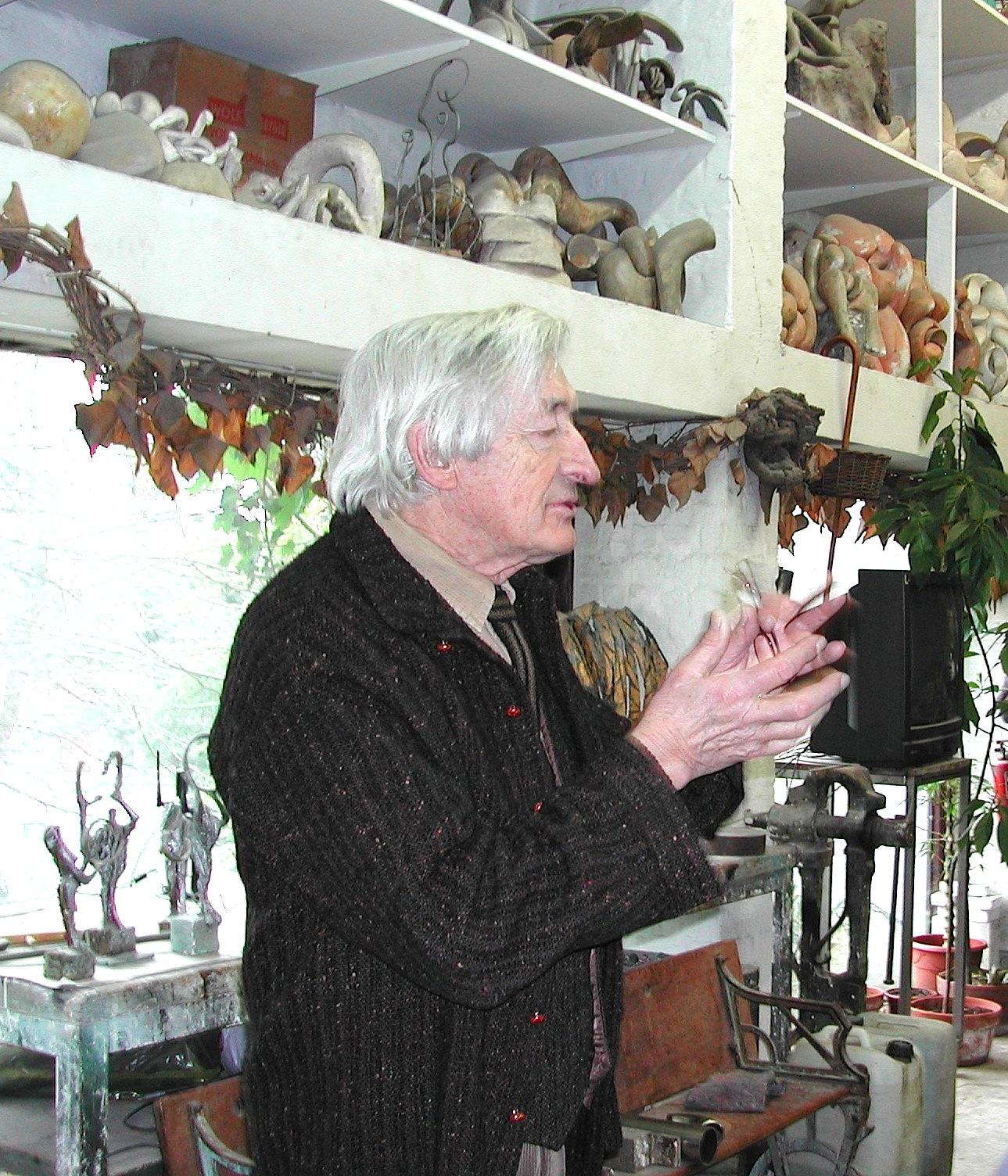
- Olivier Strebelle in his home/studio outside Brussels, January 2009
- Born: 20 January 1927; Uccle, Brussels, Belgium
- Died: 29 July 2017 (aged 90)
- Style: bronze sculptures
- Father: Rodolphe Strebelle
- Relatives: Claude Strebelle (brother)
- Website: www.olivierstrebelle.com

Olivier Strebelle (20 January 1927 – 29 July 2017) was a Belgian sculptor.

Strebelle was a prolific artist for more than 65 years, and his works are found in private collections and public settings around the world. His monumental (usually bronze) sculptures adorn many public places in Brussels as well as in Germany, Israel, Italy, Russia, Singapore, Switzerland, and the United States.

His style evolved from robust, organic abstract forms to the sinuous lines seen in Athletes Alley, on the site of the Beijing Olympic Games. His sculpture The Abduction of Europa (French: L'Enlèvement d'Europe) has been on display in the Square of Europe, Moscow, since September 2002.

== Biography ==
Strebelle was born in Brussels on 20 January 1927. He died on 29 July 2017.

== Athletes Alley ==
Athletes Alley is a sculpture meant as a gift from Belgium to the city of Beijing, but was not completed in time. It opened shortly after the games ended, having cost over €5 million.

The abstract installation is composed of five tubular polished stainless steel modules that reach up to 20 m height and 100 m length (weighing 120 t), and is meant to evoke the Olympic rings.

The production of Athletes Alley involved a technological collaboration between the image laboratory of Université libre de Bruxelles, Tsinghua University, a French engineering consultancy specialising in metallic frame-works (C&E Ingénierie) and a German software company (Sofistik).

== Gallery ==
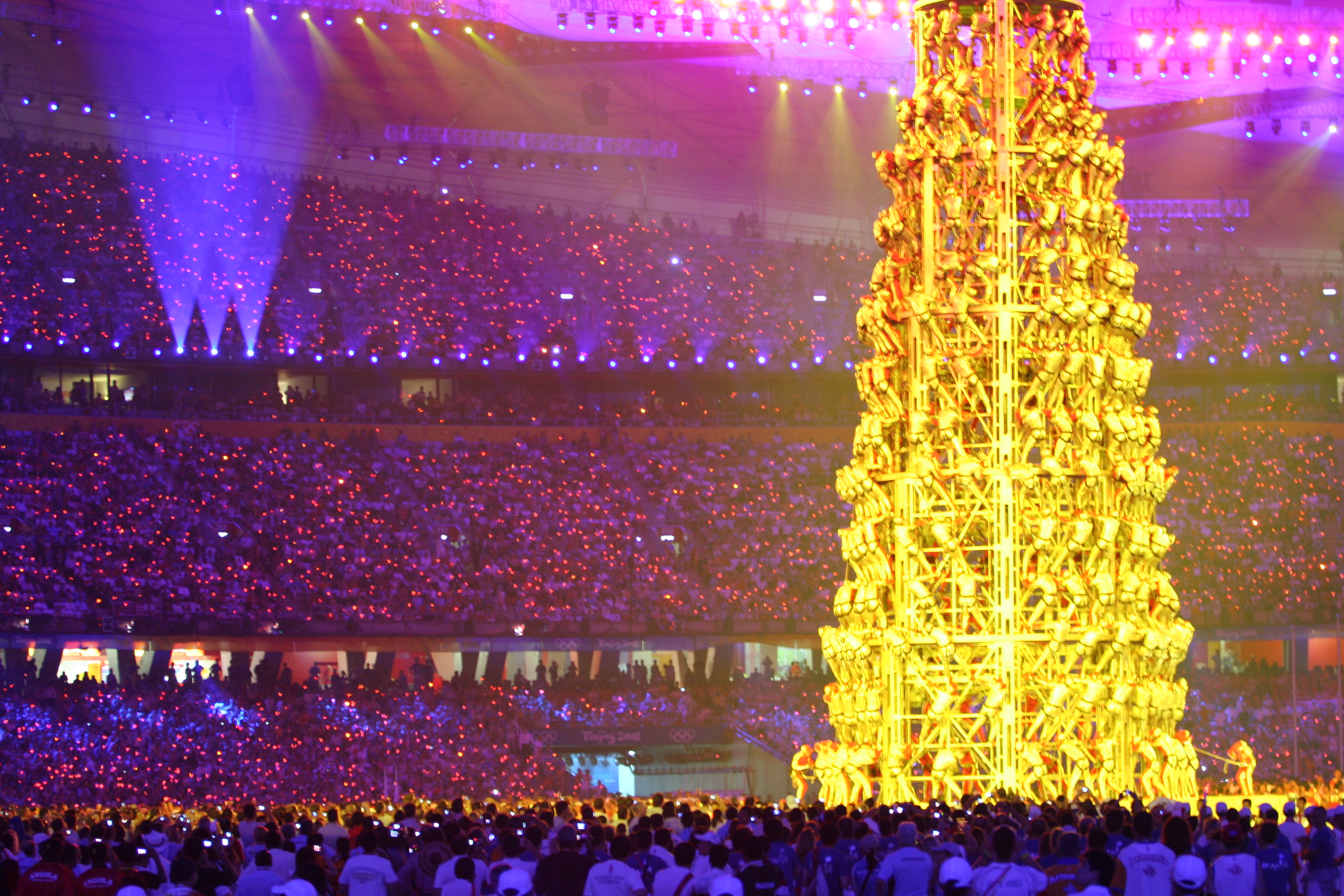
2008 Beijing Olympics closing ceremony

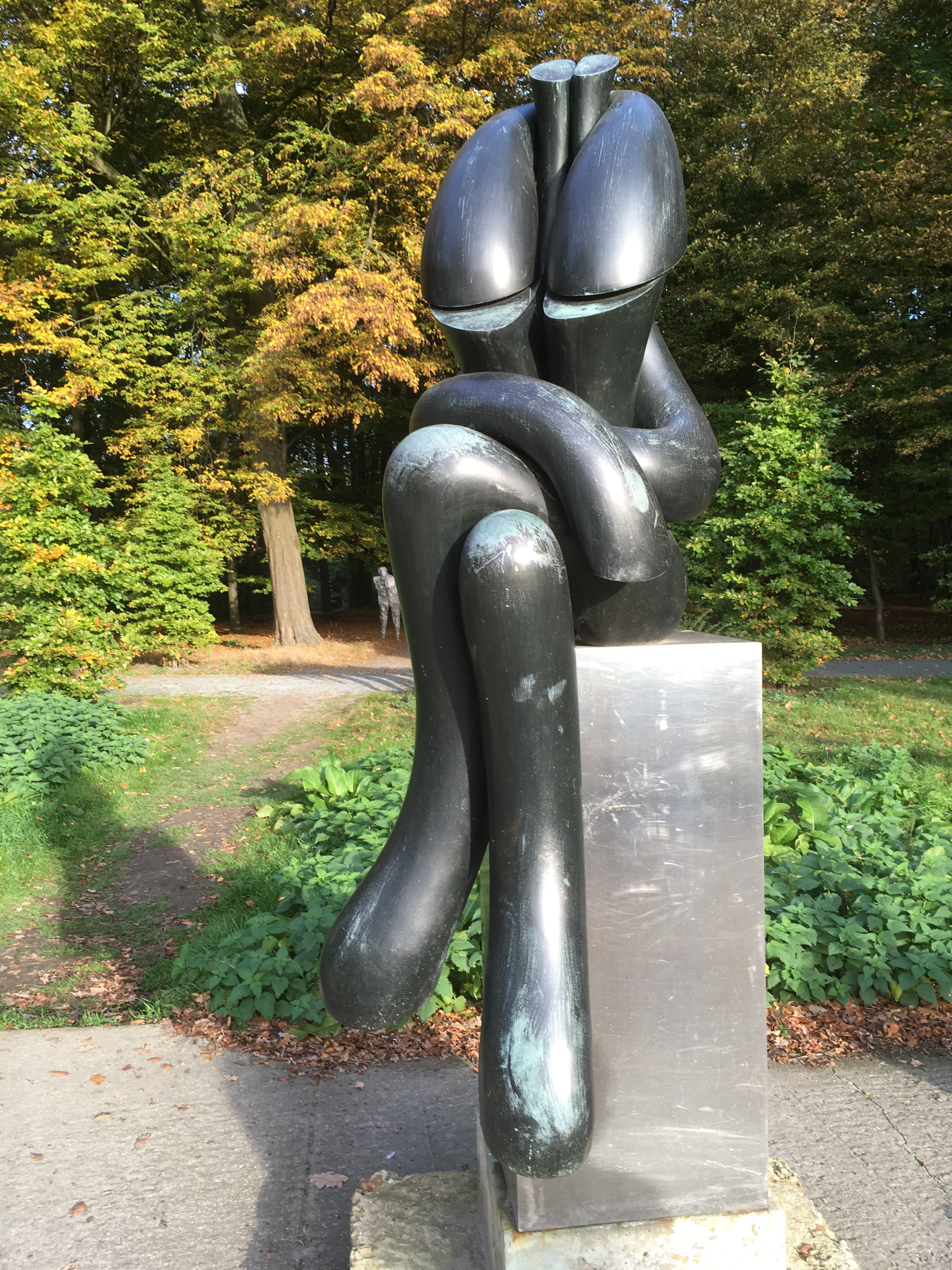
Public sculpture in Antwerp

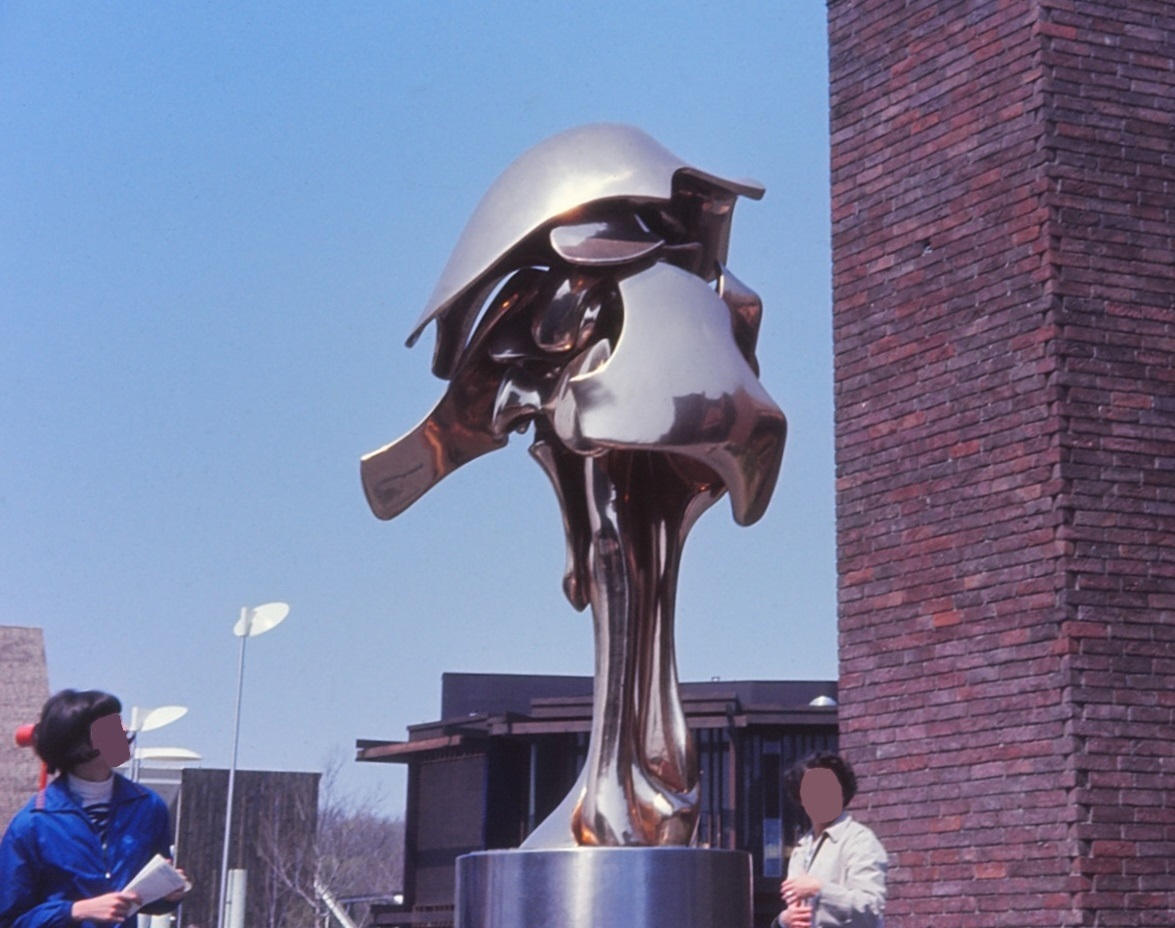
Anthropomotion lll, beside the Belgium Pavilion, Expo 67, Montreal, Quebec, Canada

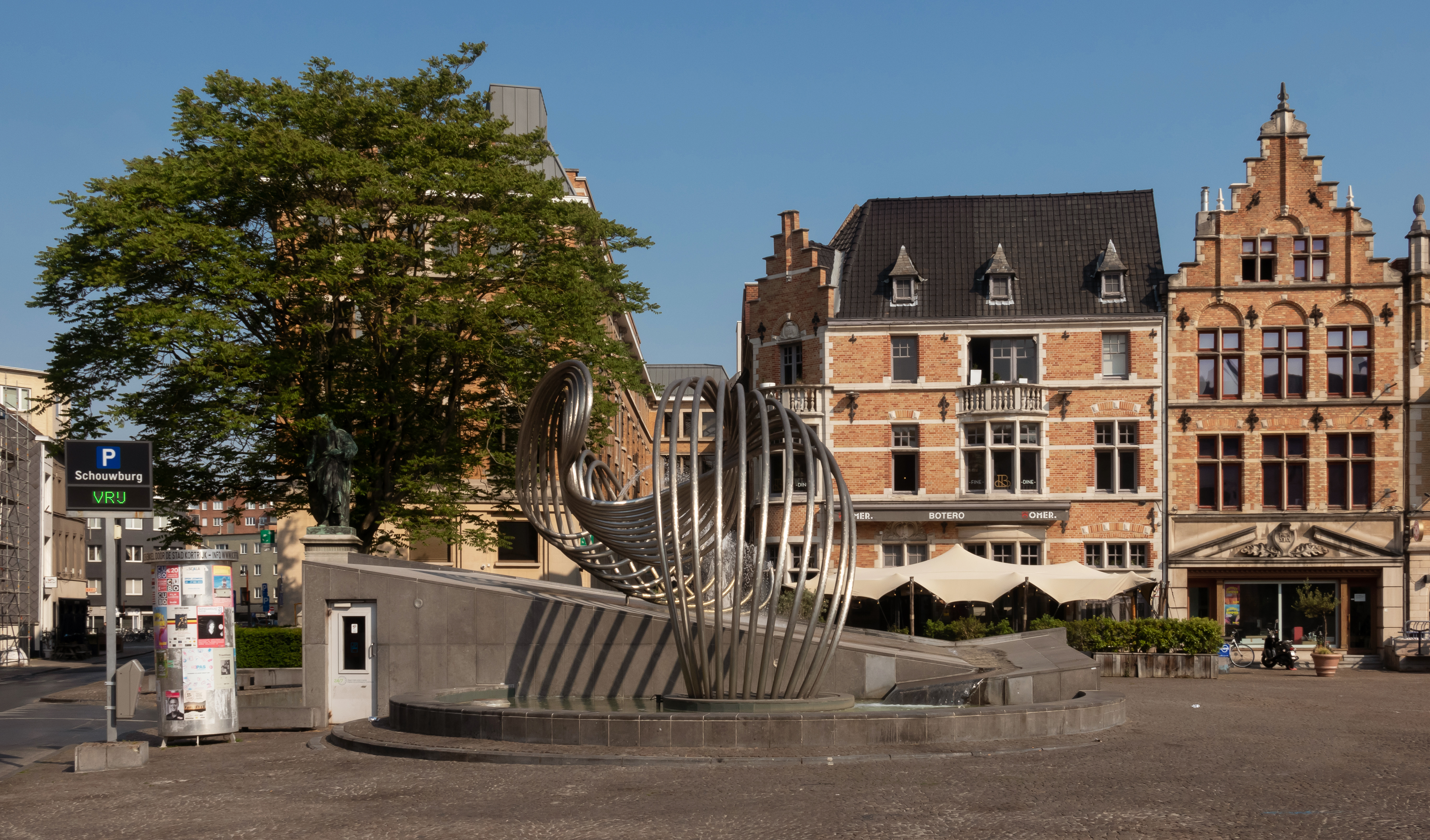
De Golf (The Wave), on Schouwburgplein in Kortrijk
