= Aprelevka Record Factory =

Defunct vinyl record manufacturer

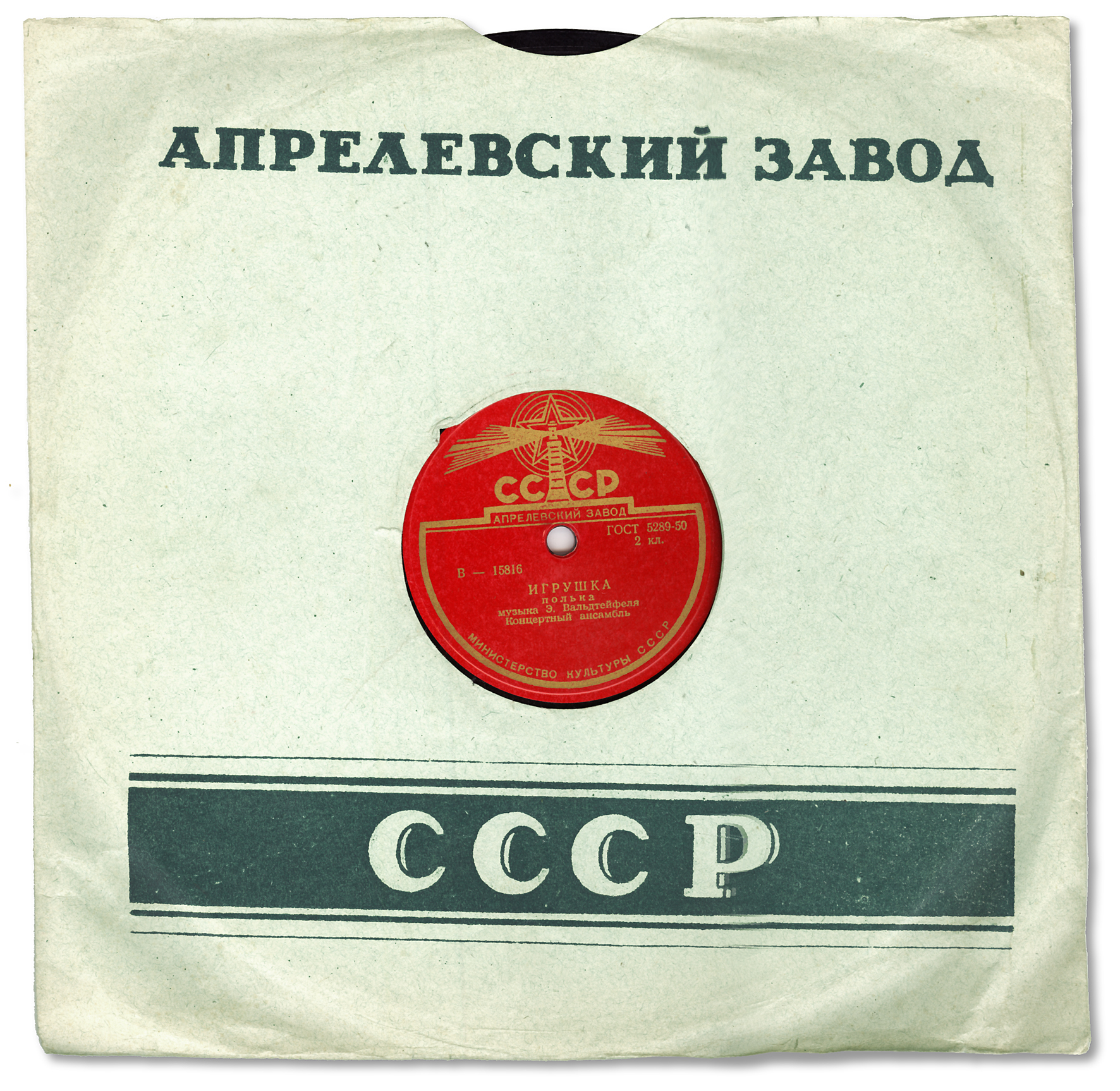
- Native name: Апрелевский завод грампластинок
- Industry: Manufacturing of phonograph and vinyl records
- Founded: 1910
- Defunct: 2002
- Fate: Bankrupt
- Headquarters: Aprelevka, Russia
- Area served: Soviet Union (until 1991), post-Soviet states
- Products: Phonograph records, vinyl records, audio cassettes
- Owner: Melodiya (1964–1991)
- Number of employees: 3,000+ (at peak)

The Aprelevka Record Factory (Russian: Апрелевский завод грампластинок) was one of the most prominent record-manufacturing facilities in the Soviet Union and later in Russia. Located in the town of Aprelevka, Moscow Oblast, the factory operated from 1910 until its closure in 2002.

For much of the 20th century it served as the main production site for Melodiya, the USSR’s state record company, producing millions of phonograph and vinyl discs that shaped Soviet popular and classical music culture.

== History ==
=== Origins (1910–1917) ===
The factory was established in 1910 by German entrepreneurs Gottlieb Moll, Albert Vogt, and August Kybarth. In its first year of production, roughly 400,000 phonograph records were released under the Metropol Record label. The factory quickly became an important supplier to the expanding Russian music market.

=== Soviet nationalization and growth ===
After the October Revolution, the factory was nationalized and began releasing recordings by revolutionary performers and ensembles. In 1925, it was officially renamed the Aprelevka Factory in Memory of 1905 (Russian: Апрелевский завод памяти 1905 года).

By the 1930s, Aprelevka had turned into the country’s main producer of phonograph records. The facility employed more than a thousand people, and annual output approached 19 million records. During the early stages of the Great Patriotic War, the first recording of The Sacred War, performed by the Alexandrov Ensemble, was made here. As the war intensified, the factory was temporarily converted to produce aerial bombs.

=== Technological development ===
Production of long-playing records (LPs) began in 1952, followed by stereo records in 1961. These upgrades placed the factory at the forefront of Soviet recording technology.

=== Melodiya period (1964–1991) ===
In 1964, the factory became part of the state-run company Melodiya, which consolidated record manufacturing across the USSR. Aprelevka served as Melodiya’s largest production site and at its peak produced up to 65% of all Soviet records. By the early 1980s, more than 3,000 employees worked at the factory, and annual production exceeded 50 million records. The facility also began issuing audio cassettes near the end of the decade.

The collapse of the Soviet Union brought difficulties to the factory. The centralized Melodiya system was dismantled, leaving individual factories to operate independently in a new market economy. The transition proved challenging, and demand for vinyl records declined rapidly as compact discs gained popularity.

=== Decline and closure (1990s–2002) ===
In 1991, Aprelevka released about 33 million records, though profitability had already fallen. By the early 1990s production had dropped to around 10 million units per year. Cassette manufacturing ended in 1997, and the factory was declared bankrupt in 2002 by the Moscow Regional Arbitration Court.

=== Legacy and museum ===
In 2007, entrepreneur Boris Chukhontsev opened the Museum of the History of the Aprelevka Record Factory inside the former administrative building of the factory. Also known as the "Museum of Forgotten People and Things" (Russian: «Музей забытых людей и вещей»),. it houses a collection of vintage records, gramophones, and photographs that document the factory’s long history.

== Present day ==
The former industrial site of the Aprelevka Record Factory has been largely redeveloped for commercial use. Several businesses now occupy the grounds where the factory once operated, and the area continues to be incorporated into Aprelevka’s broader urban development plans.

In 2014, local media reported proposals to transform the territory into a mixed-use district with a city square, park, cultural center, record museum, and a small hotel of about 100 rooms. Plans also mentioned an industrial park with offices and small-scale manufacturing facilities, though it is unclear how much of this project has been realized.
