= Eurasia Square =

Square in Moscow, Russia

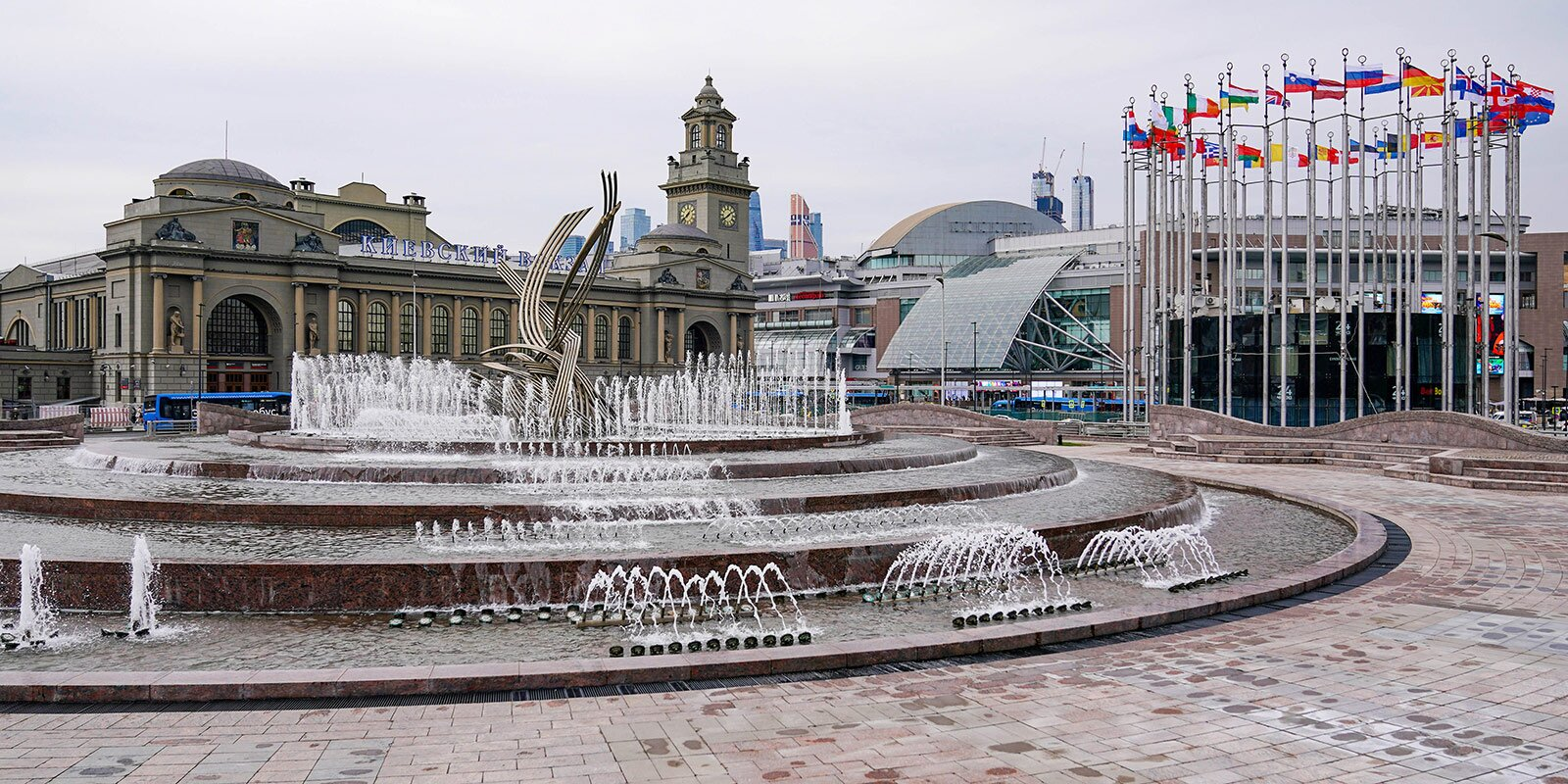
- Eurasia Square and Kiyevskaya railway station in 2021.
- Interactive map of Eurasia Square
- Native name: Площадь Евразии (Russian)
- Former name: Europe Square (until 24 July 2024)
- Location: Moscow; Western Administrative Okrug; Dorogomilovo District
- Nearest metro station: Kiyevskaya
- Coordinates: 55°44′38″N 37°34′10″E

Eurasia Square (Russian: площадь Евразии, romanised: ploshchad' Yevrazii, formerly Europe Square) is a square in Moscow outside the Garden Ring, just off Bolshaya Dorogomilovskaya Street. It borders on Kievsky Rail Terminal, the Radisson Slavyanskaya Hotel, and Berezhkovskaya Embankment overlooking the Moskva River. The square used to be part of Kiyevsky Rail Terminal Square. In 2002 it was created and named Europe Square after the site had been redeveloped and enhanced with an animated fountain, The Abduction of Europa, designed by the Belgian sculptor, Olivier Strebelle. A bridge links the southern corner of the square with Khamovniki District.

On 18 March 2023, the flags of European countries that had flown over the square, were removed and, on 24 July 2024, the square was renamed Eurasia Square. This was due to worsening relations with Europe following the Russian invasion of Ukraine in February 2022.

In 2025, flags were returned, but this time European Union countries were absent (except Hungary). Flags of Asian and some American countries took their place instead, including US, North Korea and Israel.

== Photo gallery ==
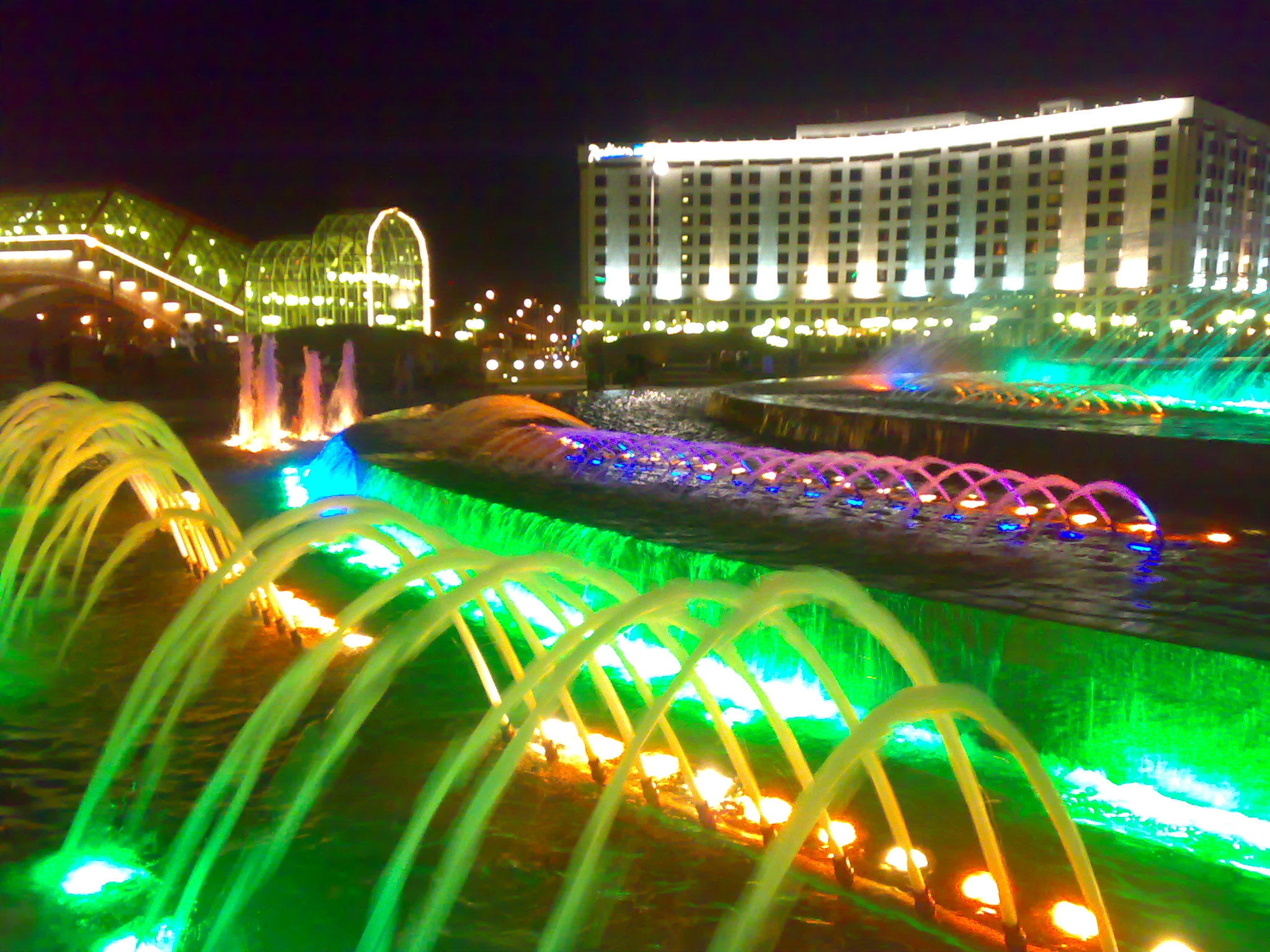
Animated fountain, lit at night
