= Ruth Sacks =

South African artist (born 1977)

- Born: 27 September 1977 (age 49)
- Known for: Installation art, artist books, performance

Ruth Sacks (born 1977) is a South African artist who lives and works in Johannesburg. She is currently a postdoctoral researcher in the South African Research Chair Initiative (SARChI) for Social Change at Fort Hare University. Sacks holds a PhD (Arts) from the University of the Witwatersrand where she was a fellow at the Wits Institute for Social and Economic Research (WiSER). Her third artist book, Twenty Thousand Leagues Under Seas, was launched in 2013. She is a laureate of the HISK in Ghent. She was one of the facilitators of the artist-run project space the Parking Gallery, hosted by the Visual Arts Network of South Africa (VANSA) in Johannesburg. Ruth Sacks' work has been presented internationally in venues such as the African Pavilion at the 52nd Venice Biennale in 2007, the ZKM Centre for Art and Media, Karlsruhe in 2011 and the National Museums of Kenya, Nairobi in 2017.

== Education ==
She obtained an MFA from the University of Cape Town in 2007. Sacks is a laureate of the Higher Institute for Fine Art (HISK) in Ghent, Belgium.

She obtained BFA, Michaelis School of Fine Art, University of Cape Town in 1999, MFA, Michaelis School of Fine Art, University of Cape Town in 2007 and PhD (Arts), University of the Witwatersrand, Johannesburg in 2017.

== Work ==
Sacks' work examines historical moments in art, architecture and the applied arts in order to comment on contemporary environments. She works with fictional narratives as a tool for encouraging multiple interpretations of dominant viewpoints. Sacks creates new fictions by revising and adapting existing texts and motifs, alongside developing new ones. Throughout her practice, emphasis is placed on the use of typography, design and language systems.

She mainly works with installation, text pieces and performance.

"Sacks' practice is research-based and usually takes the form of book works, installations and text pieces." – Gabi Ngcobo

== Exhibitions ==
Sacks has exhibited widely, with group exhibitions including: The Global Contemporary: Art Worlds after 1989 at ZKM |Centre for Art and Media (Germany, 2011), Performa 09, facilitated by the Museum for African Art New York (USA, 2009), Luanda_Pop Checklist at the 52nd Venice Biennale (Italy, 2007) and the 1st Architecture, Art and Landscape Biennial of the Canaries (Spain, 2006). Sacks' solo exhibitions include Matterings at TPO (Johannesburg, 2017), Open Endings at TTTT (Ghent, 2015), 2,000 Meters Above the Sea at CHR (Johannesburg, 2012), Double-Sided Accumulated at Extraspazio (Rome, 2010), False Friends at Kunstverein (Amsterdam, 2010) and Open Studio at Cortex Athletico (Bourdeaux, 2007). International group exhibitions include: Future Africa: Visions in Time at the National Museums of Kenya (Nairobi, 2017) and Iwalewa-Haus (Bayreuth, 2015), The Global Contemporary: Art Worlds after 1989 at ZKM |Centre for Art and Media (Karlsruhe, 2011), Performa 09, facilitated by the Museum for African Art (New York, 2009), the African Pavilion at the 52nd Venice Biennale (Venice, 2007) and the 1st Architecture, Art and Landscape Biennale of the Canaries (Tenerife, 2006).

Her third artist book, Twenty Thousand Leagues Under Seas, was scheduled to be launched at the Musee Jules Verne in Amiens, France. Previous books to date are: False Friends, published by Kunstverein Press, Amsterdam (the Netherlands, 2010) and An Extended Alphabet, published by Expodium, Utrecht (the Netherlands, 2011).

== Published books ==
- Twenty Thousand Leagues Under Seas, 2013, Garamond PressISBN 9781920663001
- An Extended Alphabet, 2011, Expodium ISBN 9789490474027
- False Friends, 2010, Kunstverein Publishing ISBN 9789490629021

== Awards ==
- 2013–16: Wits Institute for Social & Economic Research (WiSER) Doctoral Fellowship
- 2015: Ivan Karp Doctoral Research Award
- 2013: IFAS (French Institute of South Africa) publishing grant
- 2006: 1st prize, Absa LʼAtelier 2006

== Recent publications ==
- "Lived Remainders: The Contemporary Lives of Iron Hotels in the Congo," In (2017), Doucet, I., Frichot, H. and C. Smith (eds), Architectural Theory Review No. 22, Special Edition: Resist, Reclaim, Speculate: Situated Perspectives on Architecture and the City, Taylor and Francis.
- "Anonymous Objects as Exhibition Organisms," In (2016), Bowker, S. and Bremner, C. (eds.), Fusion Journal, special edition: Anonymous. The Void in Visual Culture, Charles Stuart University, Australia.
- "Looking for the Congo in Congo Style,*" In (2015), Proceedings of the conference: Admired as well as Overlooked Beauty: Architecture and Urbanism of Historicism, Art Nouveau, Early Modern and Traditionalism, Češka, Brno, Czech Republic, pp. 231 – 243.
