= Moscow Kiyevsky railway station =

Railway station in Moscow, Russia

Moscow–Kiyevsky Москва–Киевская
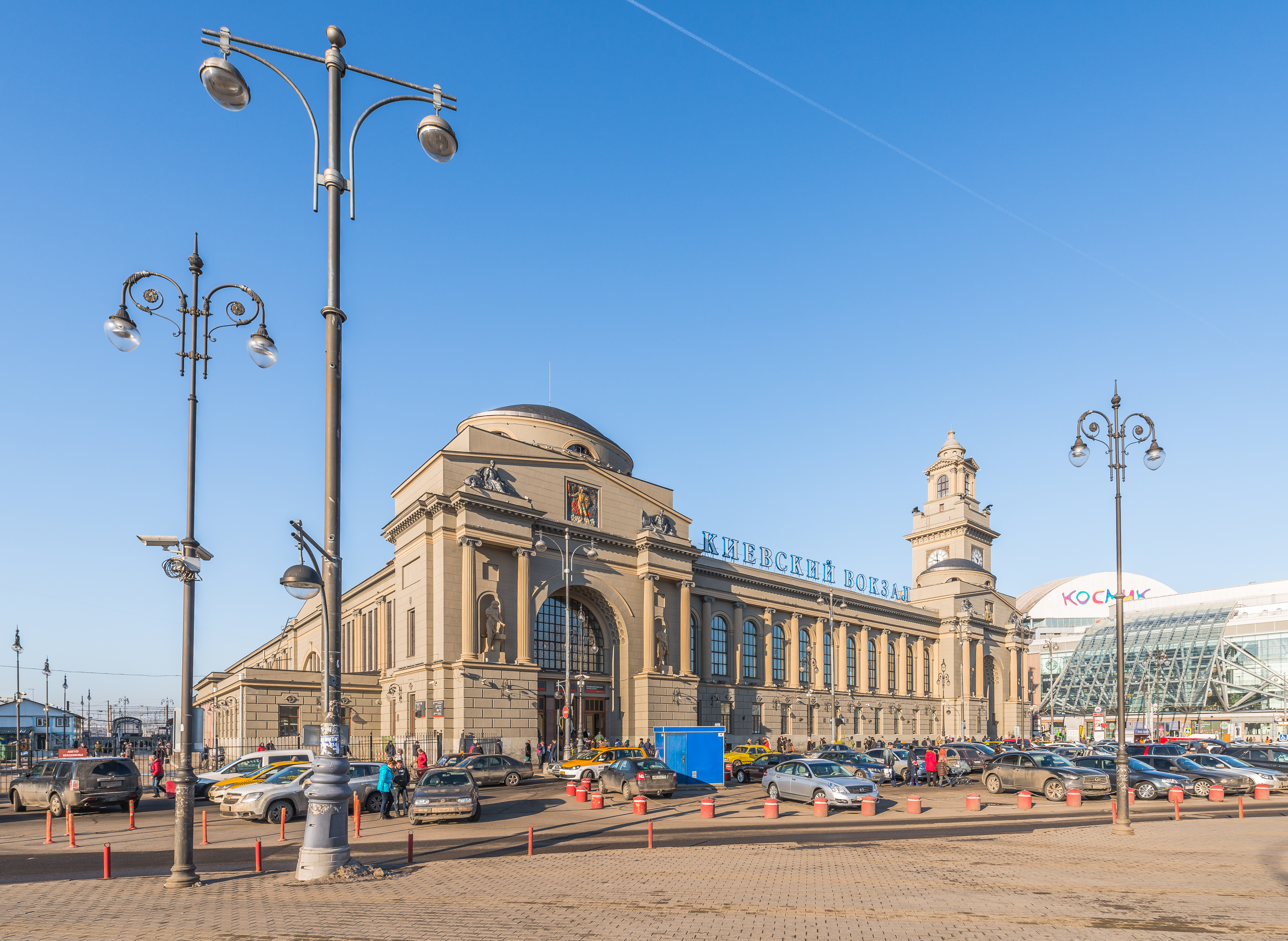
- View of the main facade from Europe Square

General information
- Location: 1, Kiyevskogo Vokzala sq. Moscow; Russia
- Coordinates: 55.743056°N 37.567222°E
- System: Moscow Railway terminal
- Line: Kiev Line
- Platforms: >10
- Tracks: >10
- Connections: Moscow Metro stations: Kiyevskaya; Kiyevskaya; Kiyevskaya; Buses: 91, 91к, 119, 157, 205, 266, 320, 394, 474, 791, 840, м17, т7, т34, т39, т39к, Regional: 454, 477

Construction
- Structure type: Heritage
- Parking: Yes
- Cycle facilities: Yes
- Architect: Ivan Rerberg, Vyacheslav Oltarzhevsky; Chief Engineer: Vladimir Shukhov

Other information
- Station code: 198103
- Fare zone: 0

History
- Opened: 1899
- Rebuilt: 1918, 1936, 1945, 2004, 2013

Services
Preceding station	Russian Railways	Following station
Terminus	Kiyevsky Suburban	Moskva-Sortirovochnaya-Kiyevskaya towards Kaluga-2
Location
- Location within Moscow Ring Road

Kiyevsky railway terminal (Russian: Ки́евский вокза́л, Kievskiy vokzal, pronounced [ˈkʲi(j)ɪfskʲɪj vɐɡˈzaɫ]) also known as Moscow Kiyevskaya railway station (Russian: Москва́–Ки́евская, Moskva-Kievskaya) is one of the nine railway terminals of Moscow, Russia. It is the only railway station in Moscow to have a frontage on the Moskva River. The station is located at the Eurasia Square, in the beginning of Bolshaya Dorogomilovskaya Street in Dorogomilovo District of Moscow. A hub of the Moscow Metro is located nearby.

As the name suggests, there were regular services to Kyiv (Kiev) and many other points in Ukraine. There used to be regular services to Belgrade, Zagreb, Varna, Bucharest, Sofia, Chișinău, Budapest, Prague, Vienna and Venice as well. 15-20 years ago, all these trains were canceled, some were transferred to the Belorussky railway station.

== History and design ==
The station was built between 1914 and 1918 in the Byzantine Revival style, which is especially pronounced in the 51 m-high (167 ft) clocktower. Originally named the Bryansk station, it was designed by Ivan Rerberg and Vladimir Shukhov, and is considered an important landmark of architecture and engineering of the time.

The station building is flanked by a gigantic train shed. The platforms are covered by a massive glazed parabolic structure (length 321 metres (1,053 ft), width 47.9 metres (157 ft), height 30 m (98 ft)) weighing over 1250 tons. Its open-work steel trusses are clearly visible.

== Trains and destinations ==
=== Directions and countries ===
Land	Places
Russia^{1}	Adler, Anapa, Bryansk, Yeysk, Lgov, Novozybkov, St.Petersburg

^{1} — Due to the Russian invasion of Ukraine, all international travel is suspended from this terminal.

=== Suburban destinations ===
Suburban commuter trains (elektrichka) connect Kiyevsky station with stations and platforms of the Kiyevsky suburban railway line, in particular with the towns of Aprelevka, Nara, Balabanovo, Obninsk, Maloyaroslavets and Kaluga-I.

=== Vnukovo International Airport connections ===
Before 31 July 2024 Aeroexpress direct line was connecting Vnukovo International Airport and Kiyevsky Rail Terminal (operations launched in August 2005). Since 1 August 2024 railway line is only served by Central Suburban Passenger Company.

== Gallery ==
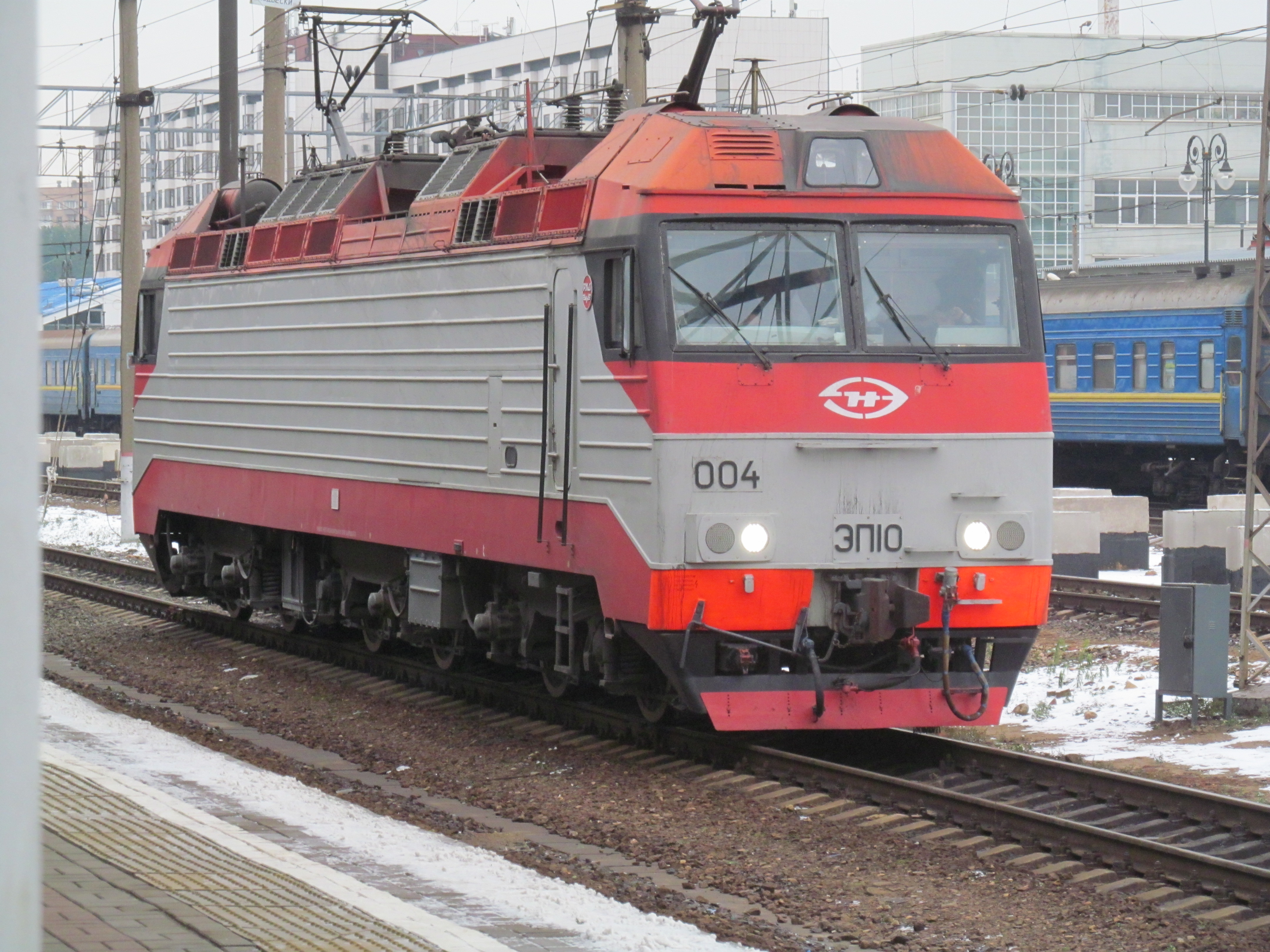
Dual voltage six axle electric locomotive EP10-004 at the Kiyevskaya railway station

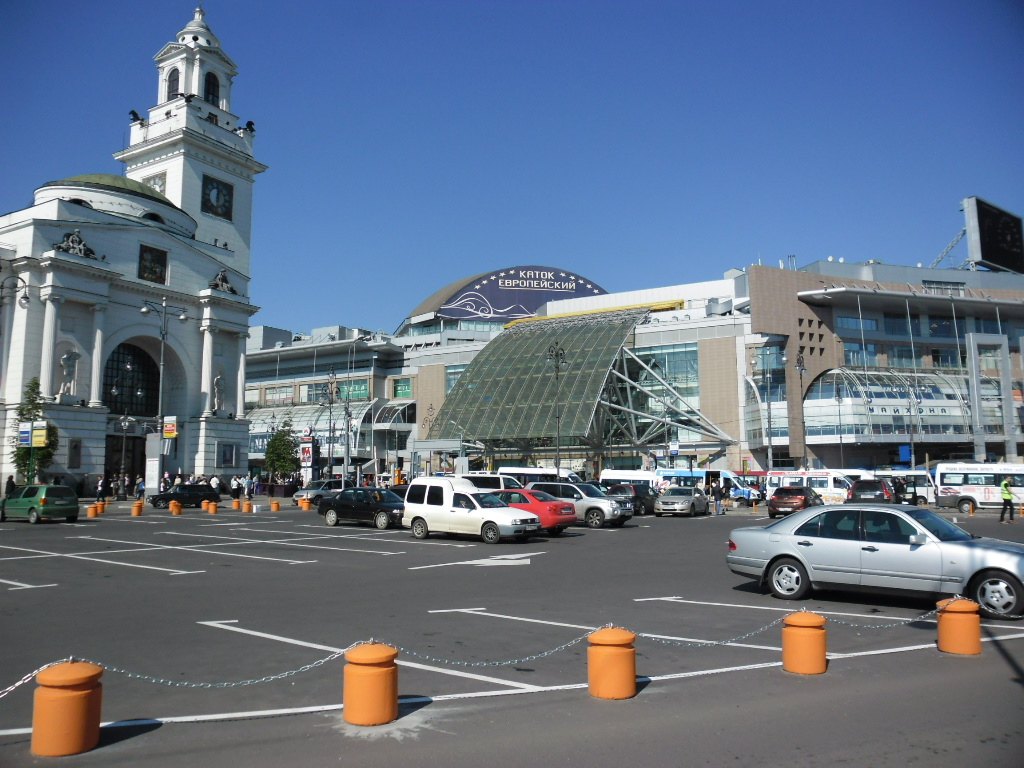
On the Eurasia square, outside passenger terminals, 2012

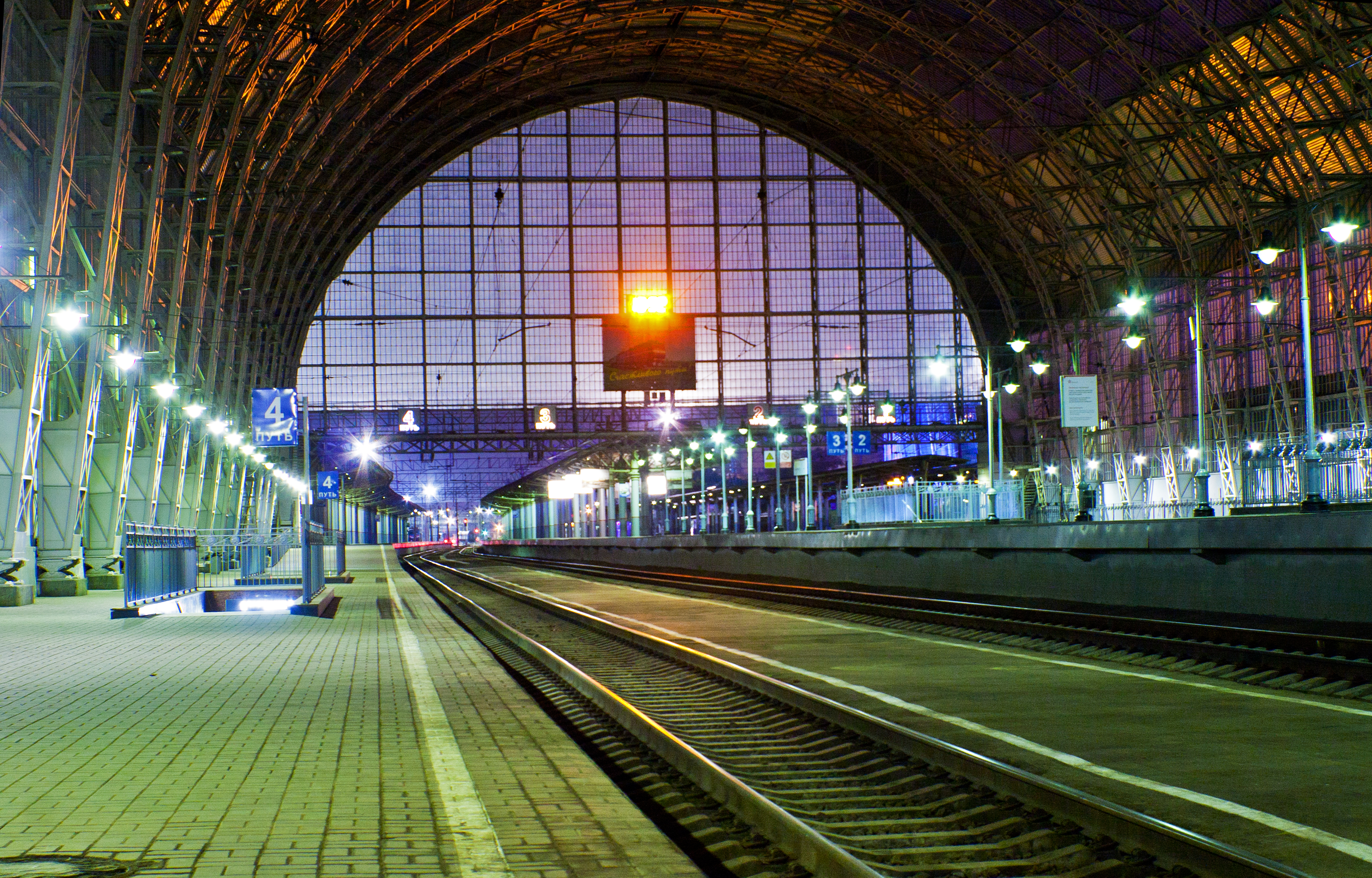
Debarkader of Kiyevsky train station passenger terminal, 2014

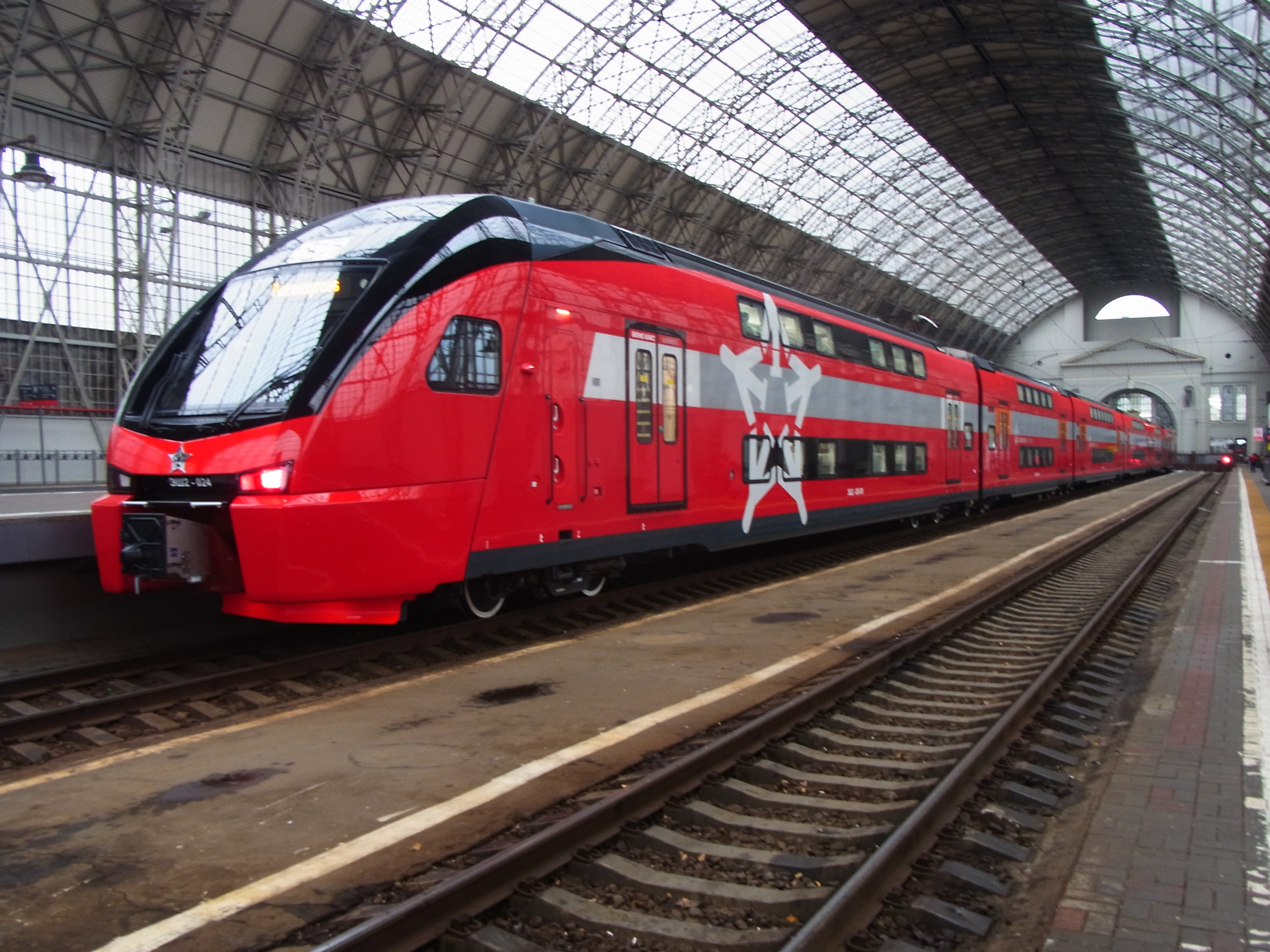
ESh2 "Eurasia"
Moscow Aeroexpress to Vnukovo International Airport
