= Aprelevka =

Town in Moscow Oblast, Russia

Aprelevka Апре́левка
- Town
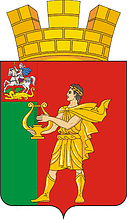
- Flag Coat of arms
- Interactive map of Aprelevka
- Location of Aprelevka Aprelevka (Moscow Oblast)
- Coordinates: 55°33′N 37°04′E
- Country: Russia
- Federal subject: Moscow Oblast
- Administrative district: Naro-Fominsky District
- TownSelsoviet: Aprelevka
- Founded: 1899
- Town status since: 1961
- Elevation: 190 m (620 ft)

Population (2010 Census)
  - Total: 18,349
  - Estimate (2025): 38,955 (+112.3%)

Administrative status
  - Capital of: Town of Aprelevka

Municipal status
  - Municipal district: Naro-Fominsky Municipal District
  - Urban settlement: Aprelevka Urban Settlement
  - Capital of: Aprelevka Urban Settlement
- Time zone: UTC+3 (MSK)
- Postal codes: 143360, 143362, 143363
- Dialing code: +7 496345
- OKTMO ID: 46750000006
- Website: www.апрелевка.рф

Aprelevka (Russian: Апре́левка) is a town in the Naro-Fominsky District of Moscow Oblast, Russia. It lies 42 kilometers (26 mi) southwest of Moscow along the Kiyevsky suburban railway line (Russian: Киевское направление Московской железной дороги).

The town is best known as the former site of the Aprelevka Record Factory, once the largest producer of phonograph and vinyl records in the Soviet Union.

== Etymology ==
The town was named after the nearby Aprelevka River. Despite its similarity to the Russian word апрель (April), the name is unrelated. It originates from the word прель, meaning a "damp place" or "bog".

== History ==
The Aprelevka railway station opened on 27 September 1899 on the Moscow–Kiev–Voronezh railway line. The station was named after a nearby estate owned by writer Nikolai Zlatovratsky (1845–1911), which itself took its name from the Aprelevka River. The river has appeared on maps since around 1850 and was previously recorded as "Oprelovka" and "Aprelovka". The name derives from the word прель (prel), meaning "damp place" or "bog".

In 1899, landowner O. S. Dubovich established a brick factory in the area. In 1910, German industrialists Gottlieb Moll, Albert Vogt, and August Kybarth founded a factory for the production of gramophone records under the name *Metropol Record*. In 1918, the factory was nationalized and renamed the Aprelevka Record Plant (Russian: Апрелевский завод грампластинок), later receiving the honorary title Aprelevka Plant in the name of Memory of Year 1905 (Russian: Апрелевский завод памяти 1905 года).

In 1935, Aprelevka was granted urban-type settlement status.

In 1961, Aprelevka was granted town status.

In 2004, the nearby village of Mamyri (Russian: Мамыри) and the settlement of Frunzevets (Russian: Фрунзевец) were incorporated into Aprelevka.

== Administrative and municipal status ==
Within the framework of administrative divisions, Aprelevka, together with eight rural localities, is incorporated within the Naro-Fominsky District as the Town of Aprelevka.

As a municipal division, the Town of Aprelevka is incorporated within the Naro-Fominsky Municipal District as the Aprelevka Urban Settlement.

== Economy ==
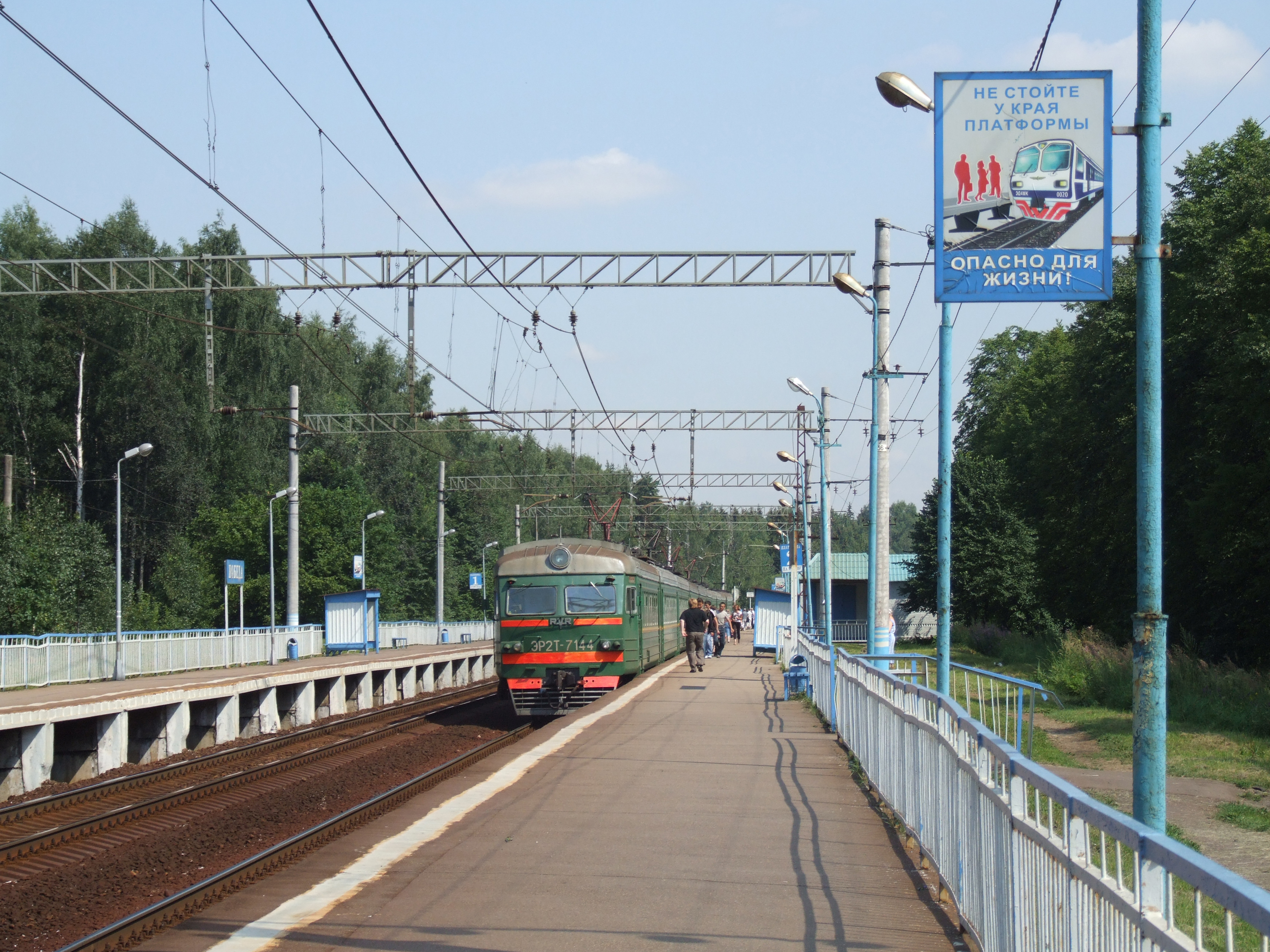
Rail in Aprelevka

Aprelevka’s most prominent industry was the Aprelevka Record Plant, founded in 1910 by German entrepreneurs Gottlieb Moll, his son Johann, and August Kybarth. The factory became the largest producer of vinyl and phonograph records in the Soviet Union, supplying a major share of the country’s recorded music.

The town also hosts a chemical manufacturing plant and several smaller industrial enterprises.
