= Central Suburban Passenger Company =

Russian railway

- Type: Joint-stock company
- Founded: 2005
- Headquarters: Moscow, Russia
- Revenue: $701 million (2017)
- Operating income: $78.8 million (2017)
- Net income: $1.15 million (2017)
- Total assets: $495 million (2017)
- Total equity: $282 million (2017)
- Number of employees: 9,000 (2022)

Central Suburban Passenger Company (CSPC; Russian: Центральная пригородная пассажирская компания) is a Russian commuter railway company. CSPC covers over half of all suburban transportation in Russia, carrying over 500 million passengers in 2011. Businessman Iskander Makhmudov and Andrey Bokarev own CSPC.

CSPC operates in 10 Russian regions, and in 2013 it had an 80% share of the Moscow rail commuter market.

== Financials ==
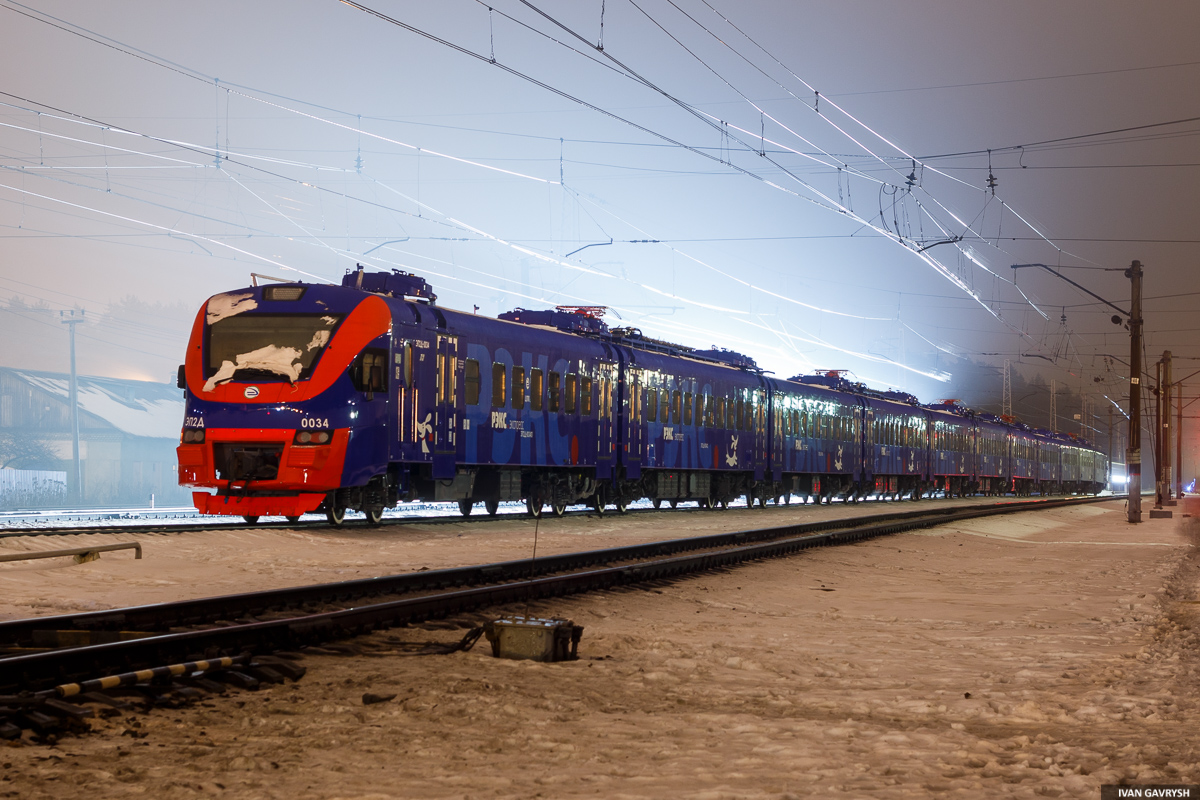
CSPC express train in Nakhabino station

In 2011, the company made 23.6 million rubles in net operating revenue and held 6.3 million rubles in assets.

== Ownership ==
Declared shareholders as of September 2018:

- OOO "MPK" (49.3%)
- Marshrutnyye sistemy (25.3%)

Before 2011, CSPC was owned by Russian Railways (slightly less than 50%), the city of Moscow (25%), and the Moscow Oblast (25%).

In 2011, Moscow Passenger Company (MPC) won an auction to purchase a 25% stake in CSPC from the city of Moscow. In 2013, MPC won an auction to purchase another stake (slightly less than 25%) from Russian Railways. In 2012, Iskander Makhmudov and Andrey Bokarev, through their company Russian Railways, purchased MPC's stake.
