= Vasily Arkhipov =

Soviet Navy vice admiral who prevented nuclear war (1926–1998)

Vice Admiral Vasily Arkhipov
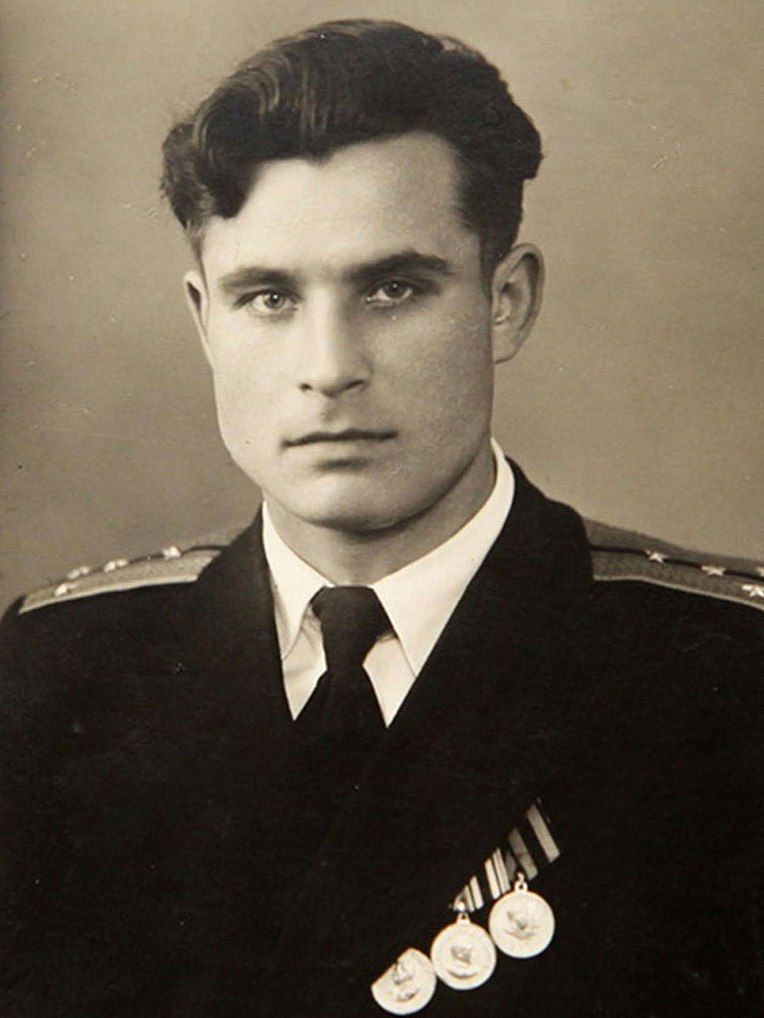
- Photo of Arkhipov while he was a Captain Lieutenant
- Born: Vasily Aleksandrovich Arkhipov; 30 January 1926; Zvorkovo, Moscow Oblast, Russian SFSR, Soviet Union
- Died: 19 August 1998 (aged 72); Zheleznodorozhny, Moscow Oblast, Russia
- Burial place: Purshevskoe Cemetery, Moscow Oblast, Russia
- Spouse: Olga Arkhipova
- Children: Yelena Andriukova
- Military career
- Branch: Soviet Navy
- Service years: 1945–1988
- Rank: Vice admiral
- Conflicts: World War II; Cuban Missile Crisis
- Awards: Order of the Red Banner; Order of the Red Star; Future of Life Award

Vasily Aleksandrovich Arkhipov (Russian: Василий Александрович Архипов; 30 January 1926 – 19 August 1998), also transliterated as Vasili Arkhipov, was a vice admiral in the Soviet Navy who, during the Cuban Missile Crisis in 1962, prevented nuclear war.

At the time of the crisis, Arkhipov was chief of staff of a Soviet submarine flotilla and was aboard the submarine B-59 as executive officer. When U.S. destroyers dropped practice depth charges near the submarine, its captain and the political officer believed war had begun and prepared to launch a nuclear torpedo against United States Navy ships. Launch authorization required the agreement of all three senior officers. Arkhipov refused, and his decision prevented the use of nuclear weapons.

In 2002, Thomas S. Blanton, director of the National Security Archive at George Washington University, said:

Arkhipov was "the man who saved the world."

Arkhipov became a rear admiral in 1975 and head of the Kirov Naval Academy. In 1981, he was promoted to vice admiral and retired in the mid-1980s.

After retirement, he lived in Zheleznodorozhny, Moscow Oblast. He died of kidney cancer on 19 August 1998. Some sources later linked the disease to radiation exposure during his service.

== Early life ==
Arkhipov was born in Staraya Kupavna, near Moscow, into a Russian rural family. He studied at the Pacific Higher Naval School in Vladivostok and, in August 1945, served aboard a minesweeper during the Soviet–Japanese War. After the war, he was transferred to the Caspian Higher Naval School (Azerbaijan Higher Naval Academy) and graduated in 1947. He then served aboard submarines of the Black Sea, Northern, and Baltic Fleets.

== K-19 accident ==
In July 1961, Arkhipov was appointed deputy commander, serving as executive officer, of the new Hotel-class ballistic missile submarine K-19. He, along with the entire crew, was exposed to radiation when the submarine's reactor coolant system developed a major leak and failed.

The submarine had been on exercises southeast of Greenland, had no backup systems, and also lost radio communication. Without the means to contact Moscow, Captain Nikolai Zateyev ordered seven engineers to devise a solution, and they improvised a secondary coolant system that stabilized the reactor and prevented a meltdown. All seven engineers and their divisional officer died within a month from acute radiation syndrome, and within two years another 15 crew members had died from radiation aftereffects.

== Role in the Cuban Missile Crisis ==
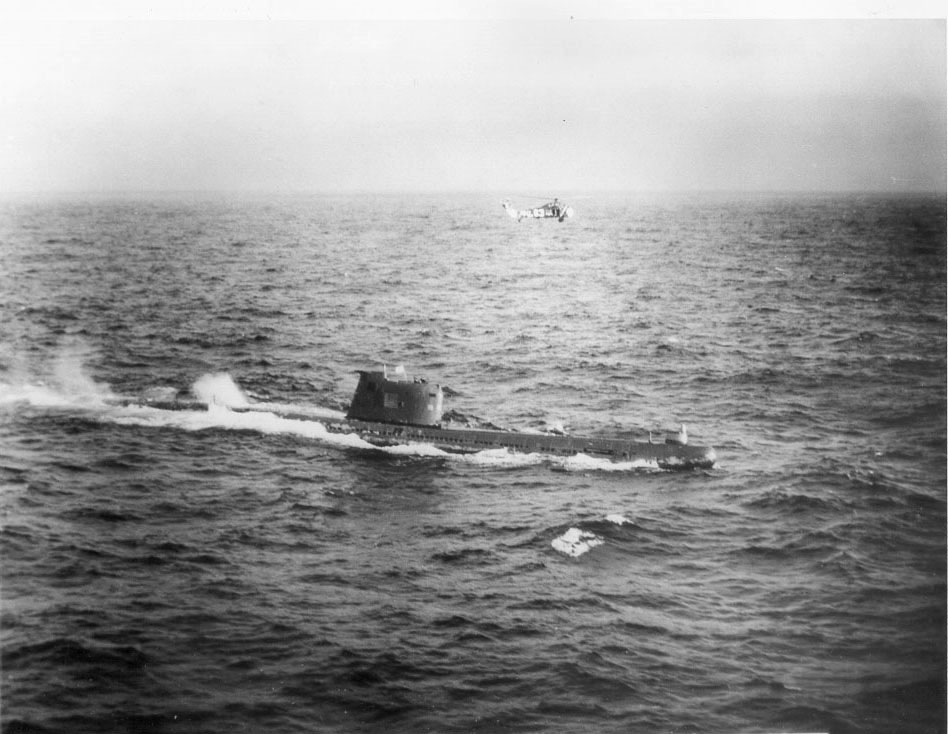
Soviet submarine B-59 in the Caribbean near Cuba

On 27 October 1962, during the Cuban Missile Crisis, a group of 11 United States Navy destroyers and the aircraft carrier USS Randolph (CV-15) detected the Soviet diesel-powered, nuclear-armed Foxtrot-class submarine B-59 near Cuba. The submarine was one of four Foxtrot-class boats sent by the USSR to the Caribbean. Although in international waters, the U.S. Navy dropped signaling depth charges to force B-59 to surface for identification.

There was no contact from Moscow for several days. Earlier the crew had intercepted U.S. civilian broadcasts, but at depth they could not receive radio traffic while evading pursuit. The men did not know whether war had already begun. Captain Valentin Grigoryevich Savitsky believed hostilities might have started and wanted to launch a nuclear T-5 torpedo.

On most Soviet submarines armed with nuclear torpedoes, only the captain and political officer were required to authorize a launch. On B-59, a third signature was needed because Vasili Arkhipov was also chief of staff of the brigade (the actual brigade commander was Captain First Rank Vasili Naumovich Agafonov). The three men were Captain Savitsky, Political Officer Ivan Maslennikov, and Executive Officer Arkhipov. An argument followed, with only Arkhipov opposing the launch.

Although second-in-command of B-59, Arkhipov’s authority as flotilla chief of staff and his reputation from the K-19 accident in 1961 influenced the debate. He eventually persuaded Savitsky to surface and await orders. This decision was credited with preventing nuclear escalation. By then, B-59 was nearly out of battery power, its air conditioning had failed, and conditions on board were severe. The submarine surfaced among U.S. warships and made contact with a U.S. destroyer before being ordered back to the USSR.

=== Immediate aftermath (1962–1963) ===
On returning to the Soviet Union, many crew members were reprimanded. One admiral told them: "It would have been better if you'd gone down with your ship." Arkhipov's wife Olga later said he rarely spoke of the events, feeling that their ordeal had not been appreciated. Each captain submitted a report to Marshal Andrei Grechko, who was substituting for the defense minister.

Soviet officials were angered by breaches of secrecy; their criticism eased when they learned diesel-electric, not nuclear-powered, submarines had been sent. Historian Alexander Mozgovoi noted that Grechko, upon hearing that the wrong type of submarine had been sent to Cuba, "removed his glasses and hit them against the table in fury, breaking them into small pieces and abruptly leaving the room".

=== Later testimonies (1990s–2000s) ===
In 1997, Arkhipov recalled that, after surfacing, his boat came under warning fire from U.S. aircraft:

The plane, flying over the conning tower, 1 to 3 seconds before the start of fire, turned on powerful searchlights and blinded the people on the bridge ... when [the commander] blinked and blinked his eyes and could see again, it became clear that the plane was firing past and along the boat.

In 2002, retired Commander Vadim Orlov, who was aboard B-59, confirmed the submarines carried nuclear torpedoes and credited Arkhipov with preventing their use. He described the situation less dramatically, saying Captain Savitsky lost his temper but calmed down.

Former U.S. Defense Secretary Robert McNamara said in 2002: "We came very, very close [to nuclear war], closer than we knew at the time." Historian Arthur M. Schlesinger Jr., an advisor to President Kennedy, added: "This was not only the most dangerous moment of the Cold War. It was the most dangerous moment in human history."

=== Historiography (2020s) ===
In 2024, historian Sergey Radchenko argued that evidence on Arkhipov's role relied on oral testimony published by Svetlana Savranskaya. When the Russian Ministry of Defense declassified documents in 2022, the Arkhipov incident was not mentioned.

== Later life and death ==
Arkhipov continued in Soviet Navy service, commanding submarines and later submarine squadrons. He was promoted to rear admiral in 1975, and became head of the Kirov Naval Academy. Arkhipov was promoted to vice admiral in 1981 and retired in 1988.

He settled in Kupavna (which was incorporated into Zheleznodorozhny, Moscow Oblast, in 2004), where he died on 19 August 1998. The radiation to which Arkhipov had been exposed in 1961 may have contributed to his kidney cancer, as it did for the illnesses of many others who served with him in the K-19 accident.

Nikolai Zateyev, the commander of the submarine K-19 at the time of its onboard nuclear accident, died on 28 August 1998. Both Arkhipov and Zateyev were 72 at the time of their deaths.

== Personal life ==
Arkhipov was known to be a shy and humble man. In a 2012 PBS documentary titled The Man Who Saved the World, his wife, Olga, described him as intelligent, polite, and very calm. Much of what is known about his personality comes from her. According to her, he enjoyed searching for newspapers during their vacations and tried to stay up-to-date with the modern world as much as possible. In this same interview, Olga alluded to her husband's possible superstitious beliefs as well. She recalls walking in on Vasily burning a bundle of their love letters inside their house and that he claimed that keeping the letters would mean "bad luck".

== In popular culture ==
Leon Ockenden portrayed Arkhipov in Season 12 Episode 1 of Secrets of the Dead, titled "The Man Who Saved the World". It was aired 23 October 2012 on the 50th anniversary of the Cuban Missile Crisis.

The 2021 novel Red Traitor by Owen Matthews includes Arkhipov as a major viewpoint character, and is dedicated to him.

The character of Captain Mikhail Polenin, portrayed by Liam Neeson, in the 2002 film K-19: The Widowmaker was based on Arkhipov's tenure on Soviet submarine K-19.

== Awards and honors ==
In recognition of his actions onboard B-59, Arkhipov received the first "Future of Life Award", which was presented posthumously to his family in 2017. Offered by the Future of Life Institute, this award recognizes exceptional measures, often performed despite personal risk and without obvious reward, to safeguard the collective future of humanity.

In 2002, Thomas S. Blanton, then director of the U.S. National Security Archive, said that Arkhipov "saved the world".

== See also ==
- Stanislav Petrov
- Sergey Preminin
- Nuclear close calls
