= Hostile Waters =

Hostile Waters may refer to:

- Hostile Waters (book), a 1997 book by Peter Huchthausen that describes the 1986 loss of Soviet submarine K-219 off Bermuda
- Hostile Waters (film), a 1997 television movie based on the book
- Hostile Waters: Antaeus Rising, a hybrid vehicle and strategy PC game
