= Sergey Preminin =

Soviet Russian sailor (1965–1986)

- Born: 18 October 1965; Skornyakovo, Vologda Oblast, Russian SFSR, Soviet Union
- Died: 3 October 1986 (aged 20) K-219, Sargasso Sea, Atlantic Ocean
- Allegiance: Soviet Union
- Branch: Soviet Navy
- Service years: 1984–1986
- Rank: Seaman
- Awards: Hero of the Russian Federation (7 August 1997), Order of the Red Star (23 July 1987), Order "For Merit to the Fatherland" (31 October 2003)

Sergey Anatolievich Preminin (Russian: Сергей Анатольевич Преминин; 18 October 1965 – 3 October 1986) was a Soviet Russian sailor who, after an explosion aboard nuclear submarine K-219, prevented an impending nuclear meltdown by manually forcing damaged control rods into place. He was, however, unable to exit the reactor compartment because the hatch had jammed due to increased pressure, and died.

Preminin was posthumously awarded the Order of the Red Star, the medal of Hero of the Russian Federation and the Order "For Merit to the Fatherland".

== Early life ==
Preminin was born on 18 October 1965 in the village of Skornyakovo in Vologda Oblast, then in the Russian SFSR of the Soviet Union. Preminin's father Anatoly was an electrician and his mother Valentina worked in a flax factory. The couple had three sons. Sergei attended school in the city of Krasavino and decided to follow in the footsteps of his older brother Nikolai by graduating from engineering school in Veliky Ustyug in the Vologda Oblast.

== Naval service ==
On 23 October 1984, Preminin started to serve in the Soviet Navy. Preminin initially underwent a training in a special group in Severodvinsk, after which he started to serve aboard the K-219.

=== Death ===
On 3 October 1986, while on patrol 680 miles (1,090 km) northeast of Bermuda, the K-219 suffered an explosion and fire in missile compartment VI. Three sailors were killed outright in the explosion. The vessel surfaced to permit its twin nuclear reactors to be shut down.

The remaining crew was assigned to the bow or the stern, as far away from the explosion site as possible, and had been issued gas masks. Soon after, the temperature indicator showed a very high temperature at the nuclear reactors, and the flow of coolant in the reactor gradually decreased further. This meant that a meltdown was imminent. However, the reactor shutdown could not proceed as planned from the control station; the trigger of the control rods had been damaged, by either the expanding gases or the intense heat. For this reason, the reactor SCRAM had to be carried out manually, directly into the reactor chamber. This also meant that the men doing this would be exposed to strong radiation, since the on-board contamination coveralls were not designed to protect the sailors from the strong gamma and neutron radiation directly in the vicinity of the reactor core.

The officer of the reactor department, Nikolay Belikov, and his subordinate—sailor Sergei Preminin—went into the reactor chamber to complete the reactor SCRAM. They dropped three of four rods, but because of the high temperature (about 70°C or 158°F), Belikov lost consciousness after being forced to evacuate. Preminin, now working alone, had to put the fourth rod in place. This was a job that required great physical strength, as the holders of the rods were now severely deformed by the heat.

When he tried to leave the reactor chamber, he could not open the hatch, as a pressure difference had been established between the reactor chamber and the reactor control station. After further attempts from other colleagues to force open the hatch from outside, Preminin died in the hot reactor chamber, as the rest of the crew had to move further towards the rear to escape the poisonous gases that spread out in the boat.

== In film ==
The sinking of the submarine and Preminin's feat were the subject for the book Hostile Waters, written by Peter Huchthausen, Igor Kurdin and R. Alan White. The BBC produced a television film of the same name in the same year, under the direction of David Drury of Warner Bros. Rob Campbell played the role of Preminin.

== Honors ==
=== Military awards ===
- Order of the Red Star (posthumously) by decree of the Presidium of the Supreme Soviet of the USSR (23 July 1987)
- Hero of the Russian Federation (posthumously), Medal #409, President's decree number 844 of 7 August 1997
- Order "For Merit to the Fatherland" I degree (31 October 2003, posthumously)

=== Monuments ===
- In the city of Gadzhiyevo, a monument was erected, and a road and two schools were named after him.
- In the city of Krasawino, a monument was erected in his honor.
- In Preminin's native Skornyakovo, a marble plaque commemorates his heroism with an inscription that reads: "To Russian Seaman Sergei Preminin, who has saved the world from a nuclear catastrophe."

=== Other ===
In Vologda in 2004 named a street in south part of city in memory of Sergei. In Vologda Oblast there are 2 schools named in memory of Sergei (including one school in his hometown, Krasavino). In 2015, in a letter to the Naming and Recognition Committee for National Heroes Day Preminin was also nominated as a national hero of Bermuda.

== See also ==
- Vasily Arkhipov
- List of Heroes of the Russian Federation
