= Peter Huchthausen =

American novelist

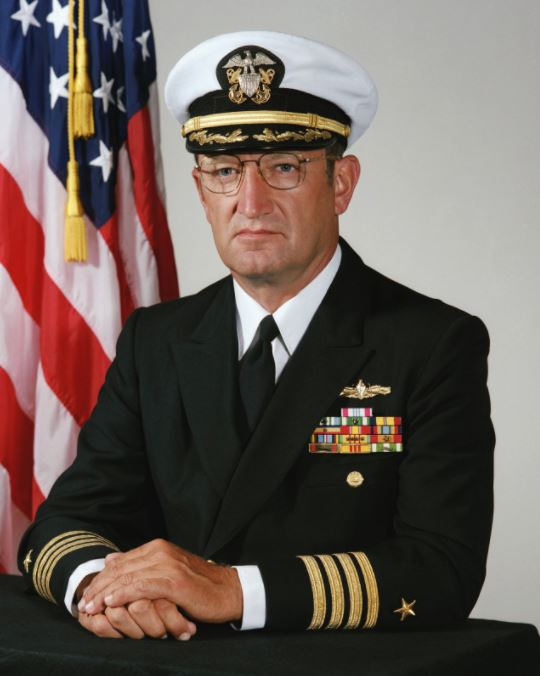
- Captain Peter Huchthausen pictured 1985
- Born: September 25, 1939
- Died: July 11, 2008 (aged 68)
- Burial place: Arlington National Cemetery
- Alma mater: Valley Forge Military Academy; United States Naval Academy
- Military career
- Allegiance: United States of America
- Branch: United States Navy
- Rank: Captain
- Conflicts: Cuban Missile Crisis; Vietnam War

Peter Anthony Huchthausen (September 25, 1939 – July 11, 2008 in Amfreville, Manche, France) was a Captain in the United States Navy and the author of several maritime books.

== Naval career ==
The son of the late Chaplain (Colonel) and Mrs. Walther A. Huchthausen, Peter graduated from Valley Forge Military Academy in 1957 and from the United States Naval Academy in 1962.

Huchthausen served as a line officer in the destroyer USS Blandy during the Cuban Missile Crisis, enforcing the naval blockade and verifying the removal of Soviet missiles from Cuba. He then served two combat tours of duty during Vietnam War, commanding a patrol boat and unit of ten river patrol boats in combat on the Mekong River with the United States Navy's Riverine Force in the Mekong Delta. He returned to Vietnam as chief engineer in the destroyer USS Orleck, which provided naval gunfire support to Army and Marine forces operations along the Vietnam coast. Transferring to Naval Intelligence, he became a Soviet naval submarine analyst and served in anti-submarine warfare positions on the staffs of Commander, U.S. Naval Forces, Europe, the United States First Fleet, The United States Third Fleet, and the Commander in Chief, Pacific Command. Later, he became the senior American naval attaché in Yugoslavia and Romania. Afterward, he became the chief of attaché and human intelligence collection operations in Western Europe for the Defense Intelligence Agency. Just before the dissolution of the Soviet Union, Huchthausen served for three years in Moscow as the senior U.S. Naval Attaché to the Union of Soviet Socialist Republics.

== Post-naval career ==
After retiring from active service from the United States Navy in 1990, Huchthausen returned to Moscow and opened an office there for an American firm. At this point, he began his research and writing career. He wrote nine books. Two were made into movies: the HBO movie, Hostile Waters and K-19: The Widowmaker.

Shortly before his death, he moved to Normandy, where he opened a bed and breakfast in Amfreville.

He was survived by his daughter, Donna Davis (Colin); grandchildren Ewan and Blake of Perth, Western Australia; son Paul Huchthausen (Dana), grandchildren, Bailey Anne and Nicholas of Gum Spring, Virginia; as well as sisters Christa Mueller (Fritz) of Williamsburg, VA, Ann Ekman (Mike) of Waynesboro, VA; and former wife and friend, Kathleen Huchthausen of Kennebunk and Frye Island, Maine

He was buried with full military honors at Arlington National Cemetery on December 3, 2008, after a funeral at the Fort Myer Old Post Chapel.

== Published books ==
- Echoes of the Mekong, by Peter A. Huchthausen and Nguyen Thi Lung. (Baltimore: Nautical & Aviation Pub. Co. of America, 1996).
- Hostile waters, by Peter Huchthausen, Igor Kurdin, and R. Alan White (New York: St. Martin's Press, 1997), sold more than 200,000 copies worldwide and became an HBO movie of the same name.
- Frye Island: Maine's newest town a history, 1748-1998, by Peter A. Huchthausen; illustrated by Christa H. Mueller. (Bowie, Md.: Heritage Books, 1998)
- K-19: the widowmaker: the secret story of the Soviet nuclear submarine , (Washington, D.C.: National Geographic Books, 2002), also became a movie by the same name starring Harrison Ford and Liam Neeson.
- October Fury. (Hoboken, N.J.: J. Wiley & Sons, 2002, ISBN 978-0-471-43357-6)
- America's splendid little wars : a short history of U.S. military engagements, 1975-2000. (New York: Viking, 2003)
- Shadow voyage: the extraordinary wartime escape of the legendary Bremen. (Hoboken, N.J.: J. Wiley & Sons, 2005), a story about the escape of the German passenger liner Bremen during the early months of World War II.
- Hide and seek: the untold story of Cold War espionage at sea, by Peter A. Huchthausen and Alexandre Sheldon-Duplaix. (Hoboken, NJ: J. Wiley & Sons, 2008).
- Finding God in the shadows: stories from the battlefield of life, by Marsha Hansen and Peter A. Huchthausen. (Minneapolis: Augsburg Books, 2008).
