= Boris Korchilov =

Soviet naval officer

- Борис Александрович Корчилов
- Born: November 17, 1937; Leningrad, Soviet Union
- Died: July 10, 1961 (aged 23); Moscow, Soviet Union
- Military career
- Allegiance: Soviet Union
- Branch: Soviet Navy
- Service years: 1960–1961
- Rank: Lieutenant
- Commands: Remote-control group of the K-19
- Conflicts: Cold War
- Awards: Order of Lenin

Boris Alexandrovich Korchilov (Russian: Борис Александрович Корчилов; November 17, 1937, Leningrad, USSR – July 10, 1961, Moscow, USSR) was a Soviet naval officer, engineer-lieutenant, and commander of the remote-control group of the submarine K-19. He died during the liquidation of a nuclear reactor accident in July 1961, preventing a technological catastrophe.

== Biography ==
Boris Korchilov was born in 1937 in Leningrad and spent his early years in the besieged city during World War II. He attended the 5th High School in Leningrad.

In 1960, he successfully graduated from the Dzerzhinsky Naval Academy. Following the completion of his studies, Boris Korchilov assumed the role of the remote-control group commander on the submarine K-19.

== Nuclear accident ==
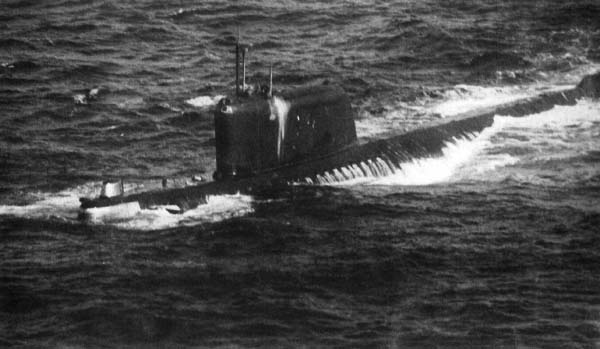
K-19. Photo taken by a circling U.S. Navy helicopter.

The K-19 submarine accident occurred on July 4, 1961, at 4:07. A crack appeared in the pipeline leading from the first circuit of the nuclear reactor to the pressure sensor, causing a rapid rise in reactor temperature. The crew attempted to increase pressure, but the reactor's temperature continued to rise. During a meeting with the commander of the K-19 submarine, Captain 2nd Rank Nikolay Zateyev, the decision was made to manually create a cooling system to prevent a meltdown. Lieutenant Korchilov volunteered to enter the reactor compartment to conduct welding work.

At 6:50, Boris Korchilov's emergency group descended into the compartment. When they entered the compartment, they saw a blue glow emanating from the pipes of the damaged reactor. They thought a fire had started, but it was shining from the ionized hydrogen radiation. The crew faced lethal radiation doses, but Korchilov, as the senior officer, provided moral support to the sailors installing the emergency cooling system. After hours of strenuous efforts, the temperature was stabilized. Korchilov's actions in averting a nuclear disaster were crucial during this critical operation.

When Boris Korchilov climbed out of the reactor compartment and took off the gas mask, yellowish foam bubbled on his lips, and he immediately vomited. Almost ten hours passed as the submarine sailed to the area where Soviet ships could be located. The submarine eventually made contact with a Soviet diesel submarine, S-270, which reported the accident to the fleet command. Korchilov was transferred to S-270 and then to Moscow for medical treatment.

Korchilov received a radiation dose of 54 Sv (5400 rem). He died on July 10, 1961, in Moscow at Hospital No. 6.

The accident on board the submarine K-19 was classified as a top secret. The irradiated sailors were buried in lead coffins, secretly, without disclosing the burial location even to their relatives. One of the surviving crew members accidentally discovered the burial site (he came to bury a relative and stumbled upon inconspicuous graves). Boris Korchilov was reburied at Krasnenky Cemetery in Saint Petersburg.

Academician A. P. Alexandrov recognized the actions of the crew and Korchilov's group in creating the emergency reactor cooling system as correct and selfless. The system, installed by Boris Korchilov's group on July 4, 1961, in the damaged reactor compartment, was subsequently implemented in the design of all nuclear reactors on navy ships, as well as at nuclear power plants.

== Awards ==
The commander of the K-19 submarine recommended Lieutenant Korchilov for the title of Hero of the Soviet Union. However, Leader of the Soviet Union Nikita Khrushchev commented on awarding submariners - We don't award for accidents. Nevertheless, by a secret order of Supreme Soviet of the Soviet Union on August 5, 1961, Boris Korchilov was posthumously awarded the Order of Lenin with the wording For Courage and Heroism.

== Memory ==
- An award named after Boris Korchilov was established in the submarine fleet of the Soviet Navy for crews demonstrating the best organization of military-technical propaganda.
- In the city of Zaozyorsk, one of the streets is named after Boris Korchilov.
- St. Petersburg (former Leningrad) 5th High School has installed a memorial plaque and an exhibition dedicated to Korchilov.
- On 1 February 2006, former President of the Soviet Union Mikhail Gorbachev proposed in a letter to the Norwegian Nobel Committee that the entire crew of K-19 be nominated for a Nobel Peace Prize for their actions on 4 July 1961.

== In popular culture ==
- "K-19: The Widowmaker" is a 2002 historical submarine film directed by Kathryn Bigelow. Actor Peter Sarsgaard played the role of reactor compartment commander engineer-lieutenant Vadim Radchenko, a prototype of Boris Korchilov.
- Submarine K-19. Non-Hollywood Story. on YouTube // History Channel, December 21, 2016. (In Russian).
- The Most Accident-Prone Submarine of the USSR. The Story of K-19. on YouTube // History Internet, December 28, 2020. (In Russian).

== See also ==
- Soviet submarine K-19
