= K219 =

K219, or similar, may refer to:

- K-219 (Kansas highway), a former state spur route
- Soviet submarine K-219, sunk in 1986
- Violin Concerto No. 5 in A major, K. 219, by Mozart
