= Norman Hilberry =

American physicist

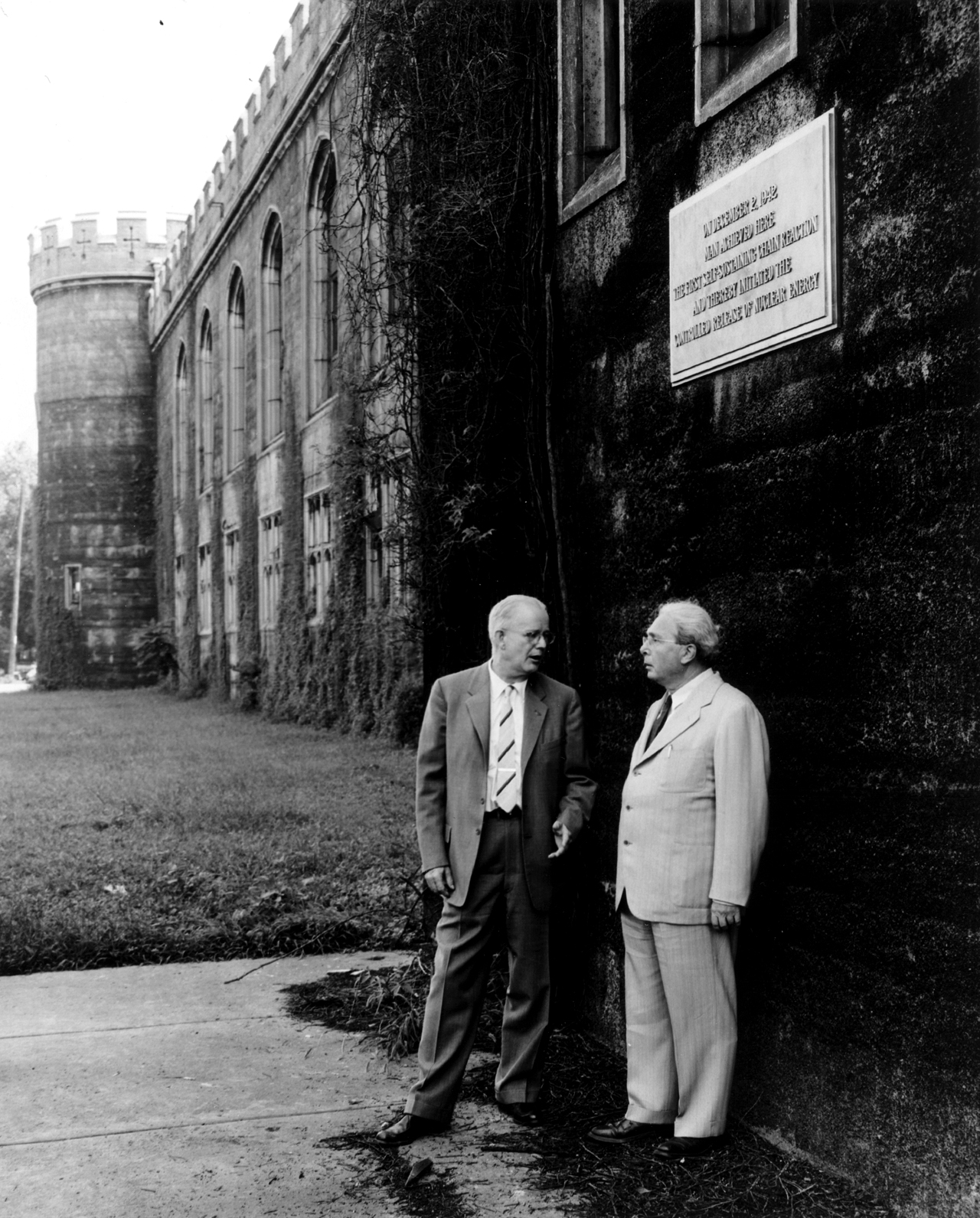
- Norman Hilberry (left) with Leo Szilard at Stagg Field in the mid 1950s
- Born: Horace van Norman Hilberry; March 11, 1899; Cleveland, Ohio, US
- Died: March 28, 1986 (aged 87); Phoenix, Arizona, US
- Education: Oberlin College, A.B. University of Chicago Ph.D.
- Known for: Director of Argonne National Laboratory
- Scientific career
- Fields: Physics
- Workplaces: New York University; Argonne National Laboratory; University of Arizona
- Thesis: Extensive cosmic-ray showers and the energy distribution of the primary cosmic rays (1941)

Norman Hilberry (March 11, 1899 – March 28, 1986) was an American physicist, best known as the director of the Argonne National Laboratory from 1956 to 1961. In December 1942 he was the man who stood ready with an axe to cut the scram line during the start up of Chicago Pile-1, the world's first nuclear reactor to achieve criticality.

== Biography ==
Horace van Norman Hilberry was born in Cleveland, Ohio, on March 11, 1899. He received his Bachelor of Arts (A.B.) degree from Oberlin College in 1921, and then became an assistant in physics at the University of Chicago. In 1925 he became an instructor in physics at Washington Square College in New York, where he rose to become an assistant professor in 1928. He earned his Doctor of Philosophy (Ph.D.) from the University of Chicago in 1941, writing his thesis on "Extensive cosmic-ray showers and the energy distribution of the primary cosmic rays".

In 1941, Hilberry joined what would become the Manhattan Project, the effort to create an atomic bomb during World War II. He moved to the University of Chicago to help Arthur H. Compton in any way possible. Hilberry became associate director of Compton's Metallurgical Project. On December 2, 1942, he was present for the start up of Chicago Pile-1, the world's first nuclear reactor to achieve criticality. Because of fears that the reaction could "run away", Hilberry stood ready with an axe to cut the scram line, a manila rope connected to control rods that could quickly shut the reactor down. He was also present for the start-up of the X-10 Graphite Reactor in November 1943, and the reactors at the Hanford Engineer Works the following year. He returned to the Metallurgical Laboratory in Chicago in 1945.

Hilberry became assistant director of the Metallurgical Laboratory in 1943. On July 1, 1946, the Metallurgical Laboratory became Argonne National Laboratory, the first designated National Laboratory, with Walter Zinn as director, and Hilberry as associate director. He became the deputy director in 1949, and the director in June 1956, on Zinn's departure. He was the first director of Argonne's International School of Nuclear Science and Engineering, an important part of the Eisenhower administration's Atoms for Peace program, from 1955 to 1956. He stepped down in November 1961, and was replaced by Albert Crewe. He remained at Argonne as a senior scientist until 1964, when he accepted an appointment as professor of nuclear engineering at the University of Arizona. He retired and became a professor emeritus in 1985.

Hilberry was the recipient of the American Nuclear Society's Arthur Holly Compton Award, and received a citation for meritorious service from the Atomic Energy Commission. He was elected a fellow of the American Association for the Advancement of Science in 1933. He was president of the American Nuclear Society from 1965 to 1966. He was a member of the board of directors of the Atomic Industry Forum from 1961 to 1968, of the Advisory Committee on US Policy Toward the International Atomic Energy Agency in 1962, and of the National Academy of Sciences' Advisory Committee to the United States Office of Emergency Preparedness from 1968 to 1973.

He died from complications arising from influenza on March 28, 1986, at the Humana Desert Hospital in Phoenix, Arizona. He was survived by his wife Ann and daughter Joan. His papers are in the University of Chicago Library.
