= Soviet submarine K-19 =

Ballistic missile submarine

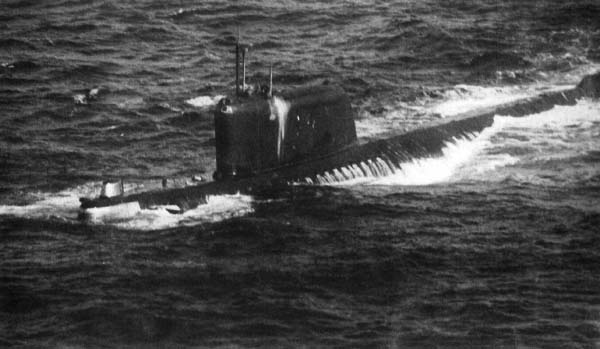
- K-19 disabled in the North Atlantic on 29 February 1972

History

Soviet Union
- Name: К-19
- Laid down: 17 October 1958
- Launched: 17 October 1959
- Completed: 12 July 1960
- Commissioned: 12 November 1960
- Decommissioned: 19 April 1990
- Nickname(s): Hiroshima
- Fate: Recycled at Naval Yard 85 Nerpa.

General characteristics
- Class & type: Hotel-class submarine
- Displacement: 4,030 long tons (4,095 t) (surfaced); 5,000 long tons (5,080 t) (submerged)
- Length: 114 m (374 ft 0 in)
- Beam: 9.2 m (30 ft 2 in)
- Draft: 7.1 m (23 ft 4 in)
- Propulsion: 2 × 70 MW VM-A reactors, 2 geared turbines, 2 shafts, 39,200 shp (29 MW)
- Speed: 15 knots (28 km/h; 17 mph) (surfaced); 26 knots (48 km/h; 30 mph) (submerged)
- Range: 32,200 mi (51,800 km) at 26 knots (48 km/h; 30 mph); 35,700 mi (57,500 km) at 24 knots (44 km/h; 28 mph) (80% power)
- Endurance: 60 days (limited by food, mental and physical health)
- Test depth: 250 m (820 ft) (test); 300 m (980 ft) (design)
- Complement: 125 officers and men
- Armament: 3 × R-13 nuclear SRBM (650 km range) as a Hotel I; 3 × R-21 nuclear MRBM (1300 km range) as a Hotel II; 4 × 21 in (533 mm) torpedo tubes forward; 2 × 16 in (406 mm) tubes forward; 2 × 16 in (406 mm) tubes aft

K-19 was the first submarine of the Project 658 (Russian: проект-658, lit. Projekt-658) class (NATO reporting name Hotel-class submarine), the first generation of Soviet nuclear submarines equipped with nuclear ballistic missiles, specifically the R-13 SLBM. The boat was hastily built by the Soviets in response to United States' developments in nuclear submarines as part of the arms race. Before it was launched, 10 civilian workers and a sailor died due to accidents and fires. After K-19 was commissioned, the boat had multiple breakdowns and accidents, several of which threatened to sink the submarine.

On its initial voyage on 4 July 1961, K-19 suffered a complete loss of coolant to one of its two reactors. A backup system included in the design was not installed, so the captain ordered members of the engineering crew to find a solution to avoid a nuclear meltdown. Sacrificing their own lives, the engineering crew jury-rigged a secondary coolant system and kept the reactor from a meltdown. Twenty-two crew members died during the following two years. The submarine experienced several other accidents, including two fires and a collision. The series of accidents inspired crew members to nickname the submarine "Hiroshima."

== History ==
=== Background ===
In the late 1950s, the leaders of the Soviet Union were determined to catch up with the United States and began to build a nuclear submarine fleet. In practice, this meant that speed was prioritized over safety in the construction of vessels, which were then rushed through sea trials so they could be put into service. K-19 suffered from poor workmanship and was accident-prone from the beginning. Many Soviet naval officers felt that the ships were not fit for combat, but fearing reprisals from above, no action was taken to prevent them from sailing. The crews aboard the first nuclear submarines of the Soviet fleet were provided with a very high quality standard of food including smoked fish, sausages, fine chocolates, and cheeses, unlike the standard fare given to the crews of other naval vessels.

==== Construction deaths ====
K-19 was ordered by the Soviet Navy on 16 October 1957. Her keel was laid on 17 October 1958 at the naval yard in Severodvinsk. Several workers died building the submarine: two workers were killed when a fire broke out, and later six women gluing rubber lining to a water cistern were fatally poisoned by inhaling fumes. While missiles were being loaded, an electrician was crushed to death by a missile-tube cover, and an engineer fell between two compartments and died.

==== Gains unlucky reputation ====
The boat was launched and named on 8 April 1959. Breaking with tradition, a man (Captain 3rd Rank V. V. Panov of the 5th Urgent Unit) instead of a woman was chosen to smash the ceremonial champagne bottle across the ship's stern. The bottle failed to break, instead sliding along the screws (propellers) and bouncing off the rubber-coated hull. This is traditionally viewed among sea crews as a sign that the ship is unlucky. Captain 1st Rank Nikolai Vladimirovich Zateyev was the first commander of the submarine. Vasily Arkhipov, who would later prevent the Cuban Missile Crisis from turning into nuclear war, was appointed as executive officer.

==== Early problems ====
In January 1960, confusion among the crew during a watch change led to improper operation of the reactor and a reactor-control rod was bent. The damage required the reactor to be dismantled for repairs. The officers on duty were removed and Captain Panov was demoted.

The submarine's ensign was hoisted for the first time on 12 July 1960. The vessel underwent sea trials from 13 through 17 July 1960 and again from 12 August through 8 November 1960, travelling 17,347 kilometres (10,779 mi). The ship was considered completed on 12 November 1960. After surfacing from a full-power run, the crew discovered that most of the hull's rubber coating had detached, and the entire surface of the boat had to be re-coated.

During a test dive to the maximum depth of 300 m (980 ft), flooding was reported in the reactor compartment, and Captain Zateyev ordered the submarine to immediately surface, where the boat heeled over on her port side due to the water she had taken on. It was later determined that during construction the workers had failed to replace a gasket. In October 1960, the galley crew disposed of wood from equipment crates through the galley's waste system, clogging it. This led to flooding of the ninth compartment, which filled one third full of water. In December 1960, a loss of coolant was caused by failure of the main circuit pump. Specialists called from Severodvinsk managed to complete repairs at sea within a week.

The boat was commissioned on 30 April 1961. The submarine had a total of 139 men aboard, including missile men, reactor officers, torpedo men, doctors, cooks, stewards, and several observing officers who were not part of the standard crew.

=== Nuclear accident ===
On 4 July 1961, under the command of Captain First Rank Nikolai Vladimirovich Zateyev, K-19 was conducting exercises in the North Atlantic off the south-east coast of Greenland. At 04:15 local time the pressure in the starboard nuclear reactor's cooling system dropped to zero. The reactor department crew found a major leak in the reactor coolant system, causing the coolant pumps to fail. The boat could not contact Moscow and request assistance because a separate accident had damaged the long-range radio system. The control rods were automatically inserted by the emergency SCRAM system, but the reactor temperature rose uncontrollably. Decay heat from fission products produced during normal operation eventually heated the reactor to 800 °C (1,470 °F).

Making a drastic decision, Zateyev ordered the engineering section to fabricate a new coolant system by cutting off an air vent valve and welding a water-supply pipe to it. This required men to work in high radiation for extended periods. The jury-rigged cooling water system successfully reduced the temperature in the reactor.

The accident released radioactive steam containing fission products that were drawn into the ship's ventilation system and spread to other compartments of the ship. The entire crew was irradiated as was most of the ship and some of the ballistic missiles on board. All seven members of the engineering crew and their divisional officer died of radiation exposure within the next month. Fifteen more sailors died within the next two years.

Instead of continuing on the mission's planned route, the captain decided to head south to meet diesel-powered submarines expected to be there. Worries about a potential crew mutiny prompted Zateyev to have all small arms thrown overboard except for five pistols distributed to his most trusted officers. A diesel submarine, S-270, picked up K-19's low-power distress transmissions and joined up with it.

American warships nearby had also heard the transmission and offered to help, but Zateyev, afraid of giving away Soviet military secrets to the West, refused and sailed to meet S-270. He evacuated the crew and had the boat towed to its home base.

Over the next two years, repair crews removed and replaced the damaged reactors. The repair process contaminated the nearby environment, in a zone within 700 m (2,300 ft), and the repair crew. The Soviet Navy dumped the original radioactive compartment into the Kara Sea. K-19 returned to the fleet with the nickname "Hiroshima".

According to the government's official explanation of the disaster, the repair crews found that the catastrophe had been caused by a faulty welding incident during initial construction. They discovered that during installation of the primary cooling system piping, a welder had failed to cover exposed pipe surfaces with asbestos drop cloths (required to protect piping systems from accidental exposure to welding sparks), due to the cramped working space. A drop from a welding electrode fell on an unprotected surface, producing an invisible crack. This crack was subject to prolonged and intensive pressure (over 200 standard atmospheres (20,000 kilopascals)), compromising the pipe's integrity and finally causing it to fail.

Others disputed this conclusion. Retired Rear-Admiral Nikolai Mormul asserted that when the reactor was first started ashore, the construction crew had not attached a pressure gauge to the primary cooling circuit. Before anyone realized there was a problem, the cooling pipes were subjected to a pressure of 400 atmospheres, double the acceptable limit.

On 1 February 2006, former President of the Soviet Union Mikhail Gorbachev proposed in a letter to the Norwegian Nobel Committee that the crew of K-19 be nominated for a Nobel Peace Prize for their actions on 4 July 1961.

==== Deceased crew members ====
Several crew members received fatal doses of radiation during repairs on the reserve coolant system of Reactor #8. Eight died between one and three weeks after the accident from severe radiation sickness. A person who receives a dose of 4 to 5 Sv (about 400–500 rem) over a short period has a 50% chance of dying within 30 days.

Name	Rank	Dose of radiation	Date of death	Days survived
Boris Korchilov	Lieutenant	54 Sv (Sievert) = 5400 rem	10 July 1961	6
Boris Ryzhikov	Chief starshina	8.6 Sv	25 July 1961	21
Yuriy Ordochkin	Starshina, 1st class	11 Sv	10 July 1961	6
Evgeny Kashenkov	Starshina, 2nd class	10 Sv	10 July 1961	6
Semyon Penkov	Seaman	10 Sv	18 July 1961	14
Nicolai Savkin	Seaman	11 Sv	13 July 1961	9
Valery Charitonov	Seaman	11 Sv	15 July 1961	11
Yuriy Povstyev	Captain lieutenant, Commander of the division of movement	7.5 Sv	22 July 1961	18

Fourteen other crew members died within two years. Many other crew members also received radiation doses exceeding permissible levels. They underwent medical treatment during the following year. Many others experienced chest pains, numbness, cancer, and kidney failure. Their treatment was devised by Professor Volynskiy and included bone marrow transplantation and blood transfusion. It saved, among others, Chief Lieutenant Mikhail Krasichkov and Captain 3rd class Vladimir Yenin, who had received doses of radiation that were otherwise considered deadly. For reasons of secrecy, the official diagnosis was not "radiation sickness" but "astheno-vegetative syndrome", a mental disorder.

==== Crew members decorated ====
On 6 August 1961, 26 members of the crew were decorated for courage and valor shown during the accident.

=== Later operational history ===
On 14 December 1961, the boat was fully upgraded to the Hotel II (658м) variant, which included upgrading to R-21 missiles, which had twice the effective range of the earlier missiles.

==== Collision ====
At 07:13 on 15 November 1969, K-19 collided with the attack submarine USS Gato in the Barents Sea at a depth of 60 m (200 ft). She was able to surface using an emergency main ballast tank blow. The impact completely destroyed the bow sonar systems and mangled the covers of the forward torpedo tubes. K-19 was able to return to port where the boat was repaired and returned to the fleet. Gato was relatively undamaged and continued her patrol.

==== Fires ====
On 24 February 1972, a fire broke out while the submarine was at a depth of 120 m (390 ft), some 1,300 km (700 nmi; 810 mi) from Newfoundland, Canada. The boat surfaced and the crew was evacuated to surface warships except for 12 men trapped in the aft torpedo room. Towing was delayed by a gale, and rescuers could not reach the aft torpedo room because of conditions in the engine room. The fire killed 28 sailors aboard K-19 and two others who died after they were transferred to rescue ships. Investigators determined that the fire was caused by a hydraulic fluid leak onto a hot filter.

The rescue operation lasted more than 40 days and involved over 30 ships. From 15 June through 5 November 1972, K-19 was repaired and put back into service.

On 15 November 1972, another fire broke out in compartment 6, but it was put out by the chemical fire-extinguisher system and there were no casualties.

==== Reclassification ====
On 25 July 1977, K-19 was reclassified in the large submarine class, and on 26 July 1979, she was reclassified as a communications submarine and given the symbol KS-19 (КС-19).

On 15 August 1982, an electrical short circuit resulted in severe burns to two sailors; one, V. A. Kravchuk, died five days later.

On 28 November 1985, the ship was upgraded to the 658s (658с) variant.

=== Decommissioning and fate ===
On 19 April 1990 the submarine was decommissioned, and was transferred in 1994 to the naval repair yard at Polyarny. In March 2002, she was towed to the Nerpa Shipyard, Snezhnogorsk, Murmansk, to be scrapped.

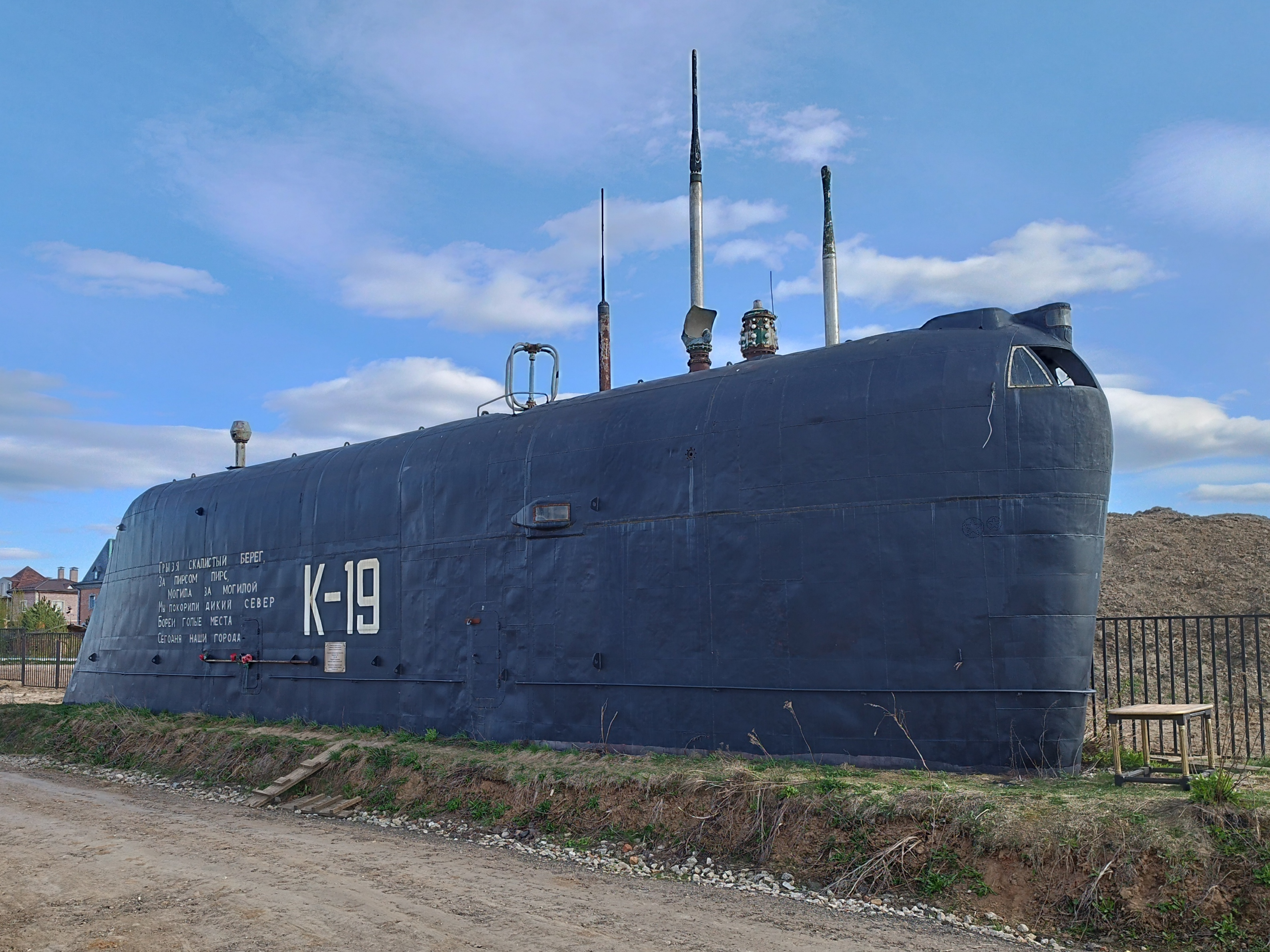
Sail of K-19 as a memorial

In 2006, a section of K-19 was purchased by Vladimir Romanov, who once served on the submarine as a conscript, with the intention of "Turning it into a Moscow-based meeting place to build links between submarine veterans from Russia and other countries." In 2023, The Athletic reported that Romanov had refurbished the submarine to serve as his place of residence in Nikul'skaya, described as a village in northwestern Russia.

== Theatre and film ==
In 1969 writer Vasily Aksyonov wrote a play about the nuclear incident.

The movie K-19: The Widowmaker (2002), starring Harrison Ford and Liam Neeson, is based on the story of the K-19's first disaster. The original crew of the submarine were allowed to read the script and had complaints, which led to several changes in the script. The production company attempted in March 2002 to secure access to the boat as a set for its production, but the Russian Navy declined. The nickname "The Widowmaker" in the film's title is fictional; the submarine did not gain a nickname until the nuclear accident on 4 July 1961, when she was called "Hiroshima".

== See also ==
- Andreev Bay nuclear accident
- Kursk submarine disaster
- List of military nuclear accidents
- Soviet submarine K-431, Chazhma Bay nuclear accident
