= Hostile Waters (book) =

- First edition
- Author: Peter Huchthausen, Igor Kurdin and R. Alan White
- Publisher: St. Martin's Press (US); Hutchinson (UK)
- Publication date: July 1997
- ISBN: 0-312-96612-1
- OCLC: 39750125

Hostile Waters (ISBN 0312966121) is a 1997 nonfiction book by Peter Huchthausen, Igor Kurdin and R. Alan White that describes the 1986 loss of the Soviet submarine K-219 off Bermuda while captained by Igor Britanov.

The incident was also described in the 1997 film of the same name. The book was criticized by a reviewer for the US Naval Institute for insinuating that the loss of the submarine was caused by a collision with the USS Augusta – a claim initially made by Soviet authorities but denied by both the US Navy and the captain of K-219 – though other reviews noted but did not take issue with this choice.
