= Soviet submarine K-33 =

Nuclear-powered Project 658-class submarine

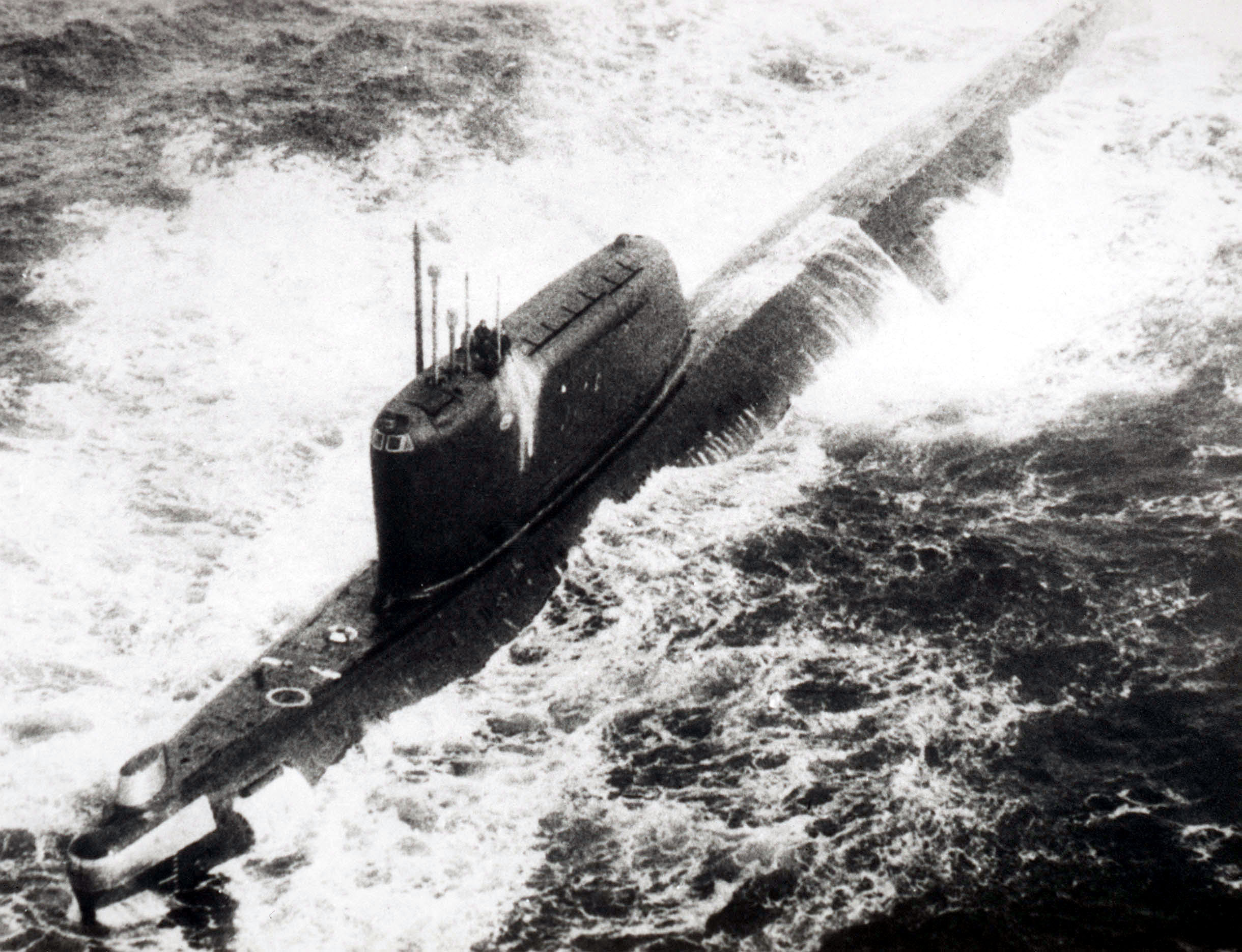
- Project 658M class submarine (Hotel II)

History

Soviet Union
- Name: K-33 (921)
- Builder: Factory No. 902, Severodvinsk, Soviet Union
- Launched: 6 August 1960
- Commissioned: 5 July 1961
- Renamed: K-54, in 1977
- Home port: Murmansk
- Decommissioned: 1990

General characteristics
- Class & type: Hotel-class submarine
- Displacement: 4,080 m^{3} surfaced; 5,000 m^{3} submerged
- Length: 114 m (374 ft 0 in)
- Beam: 9.2 m (30 ft 2 in)
- Draft: 7.31 m (24 ft 0 in)
- Propulsion: 2 × VM-A pressurized water reactors, 190 MW (250,000 hp) each; 2 × steam turbines 17,500 hp (13 MW) each
- Speed: 18 knots (33 km/h; 21 mph) surfaced; 26 knots (48 km/h; 30 mph) submerged
- Endurance: 50 days
- Test depth: 240 m (790 ft) design; 300 m (980 ft) maximum
- Complement: 104 men
- Armament: 4 × 21 in (533 mm) torpedo tubes forward; 4 × 16 in (406 mm) torpedo tubes aft; D-4 launch system with three R-21 missiles

Service record
- Part of: Soviet Northern Fleet

K-33 was a Soviet nuclear-powered Project 658-class submarine (NATO reporting name Hotel II). She belonged to the Soviet Northern Fleet and carried the identification number 921. In 1977, she was renamed K-54.

K-33 was built at Factory No. 902 in Severodvinsk, Soviet Union, as a Hotel I-class submarine, launched on 6 August 1960 and was commissioned on 5 July 1961. In 1964 K-33 was repaired and modernized into 658M-standard (Hotel II), by installing a new missile complex giving her capability to fire missiles while submerged. She was decommissioned in 1990.

K-33 was involved in two incidents.

== Kattegat incident ==
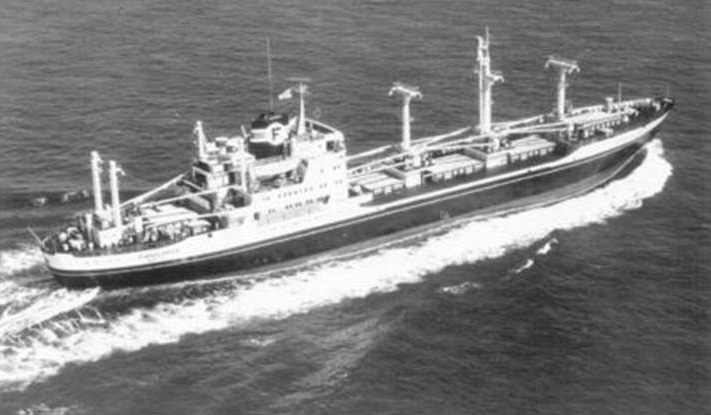
MS Finnclipper

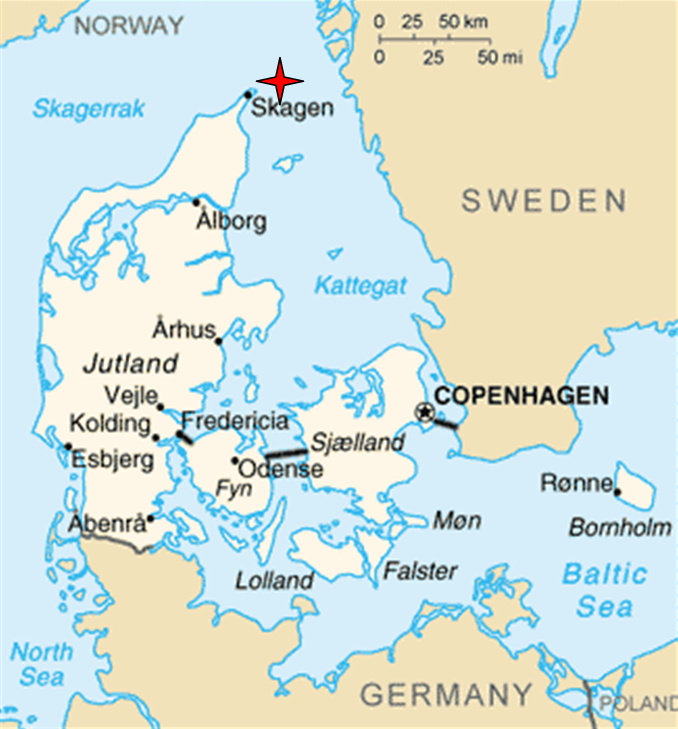
The location of the incident

On 12 April 1963, K-33 collided with the Finnish merchant vessel MS Finnclipper in the Kattegat.

Finnclipper, owned by Enso Gutzeit, was on her way to the United States with a load of 6,000 tons of paper. When she reached the Kattegat, there was a mist. Finnclipper's crew heard engine noise on their port side at 11.05 a.m. and a submarine emerged from the mist. Finnclipper steered sharply to starboard to try to avoid a collision, but to no avail.

Finnclipper immediately stopped and returned to the submarine to see if she needed help. Two Soviet officers on board told the Finnish captain that the submarine's side had suffered severe structural damage, having been pressed in and deformed. The Soviet officers did not reveal their nationality, but told Finnclipper's crew that their vessel was a Warsaw Pact submarine. The Finns, however, could read the number 921 clearly on the side of the submarine, identifying her as K-33. According to some Soviet sources, K-33 underwent an overhaul at a Soviet Northern Fleet base from 25 October 1962 through 29 December 1964 and therefore could not have been involved in the collision, and at the time the Soviets claimed that the submarine involved was not a nuclear submarine, although Finnclipper's crew had identified K-33 clearly. A 1996 Russian article says K-33 was en route to a patrol in the North Atlantic Ocean when she collided with Finnclipper.

Finnclipper managed to cross the Atlantic Ocean after the collision, although she had sprung a leak. The severely damaged K-33 limped to Murmansk for repairs. The captain of the Finnish vessel, Runar Lindholm, gave a maritime declaration when arriving in New York, but the report was labeled "secret" for over 44 years. It has been speculated that the incident was held secret due to the Finno-Soviet Treaty of 1948, under which the Soviets could forbid the Finns to report the incident in the news media or even to research it.

On 4 April 2007, Lindholm and maritime author Jaakko Varimaa, who at the time was second mate on Finnclipper, published the book Sukellusvene sumussa ("Submarine In The Mist"), revealing the accident to the general public.

== Arctic incident ==
In 1965, K-33 was involved in a radiation emergency in the Arctic, involving dehermeticity of fuel elements.

== Sources ==
- Varimaa, Jaakko (2007). Sukellusvene sumussa. Revontuli. ISBN 978-952-5170-67-2.
- Ilta-Sanomat 4 April 2007
