= Scram =

Emergency shutdown of a nuclear reactor

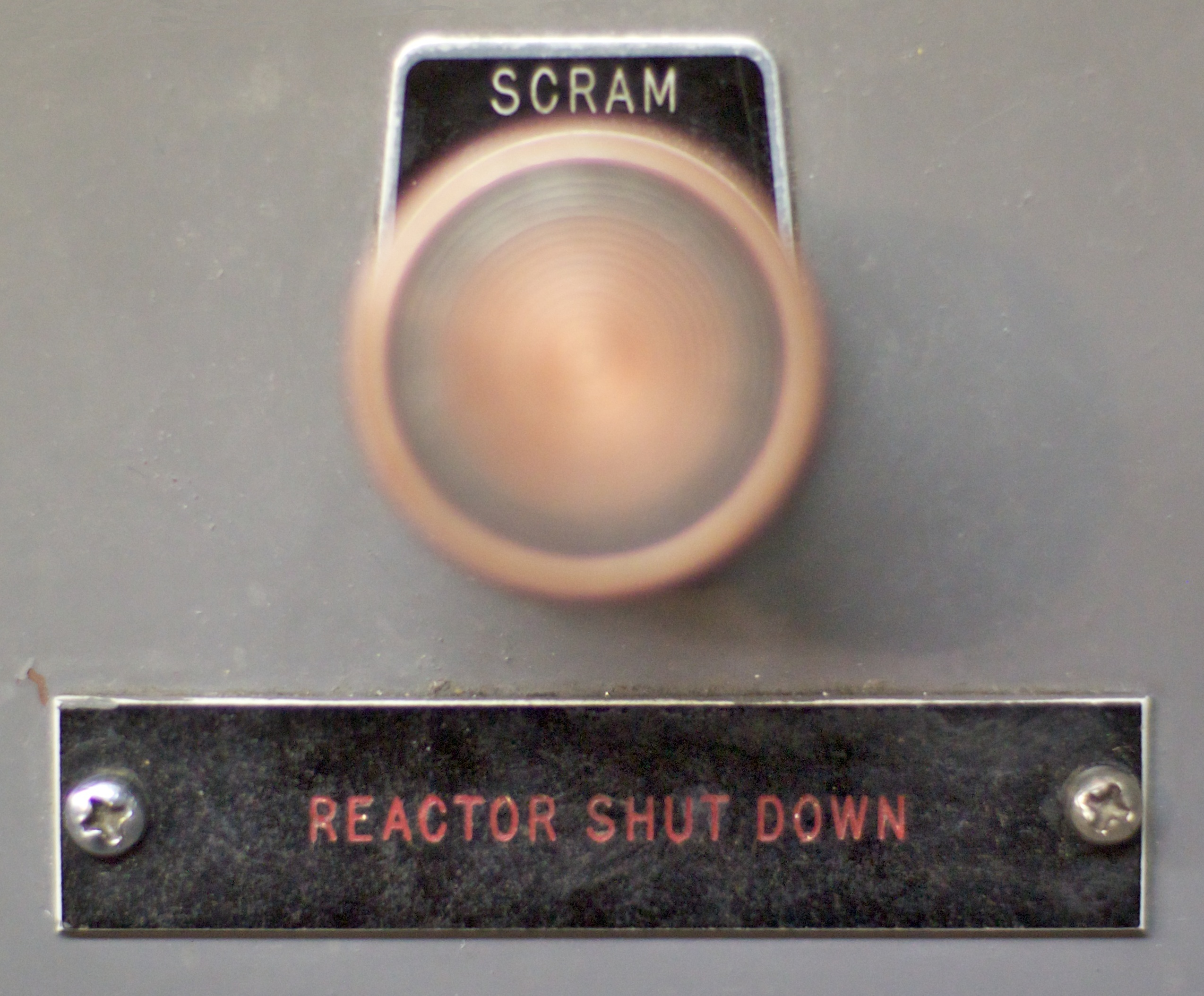
SCRAM button at the Experimental Breeder Reactor I in Idaho. Sometimes the switch will have a flip cover to prevent inadvertent operation.

A scram or SCRAM is an emergency shutdown of a nuclear reactor effected by terminating the fission reaction. It is also the name that is given to the manually operated kill switch that initiates the shutdown. In commercial reactor operations, this type of shutdown is often referred to as a "scram" at boiling water reactors and a "reactor trip" at pressurized water reactors. In many cases, a scram is part of the routine shutdown procedure which serves to test the emergency shutdown system.

== Etymology ==
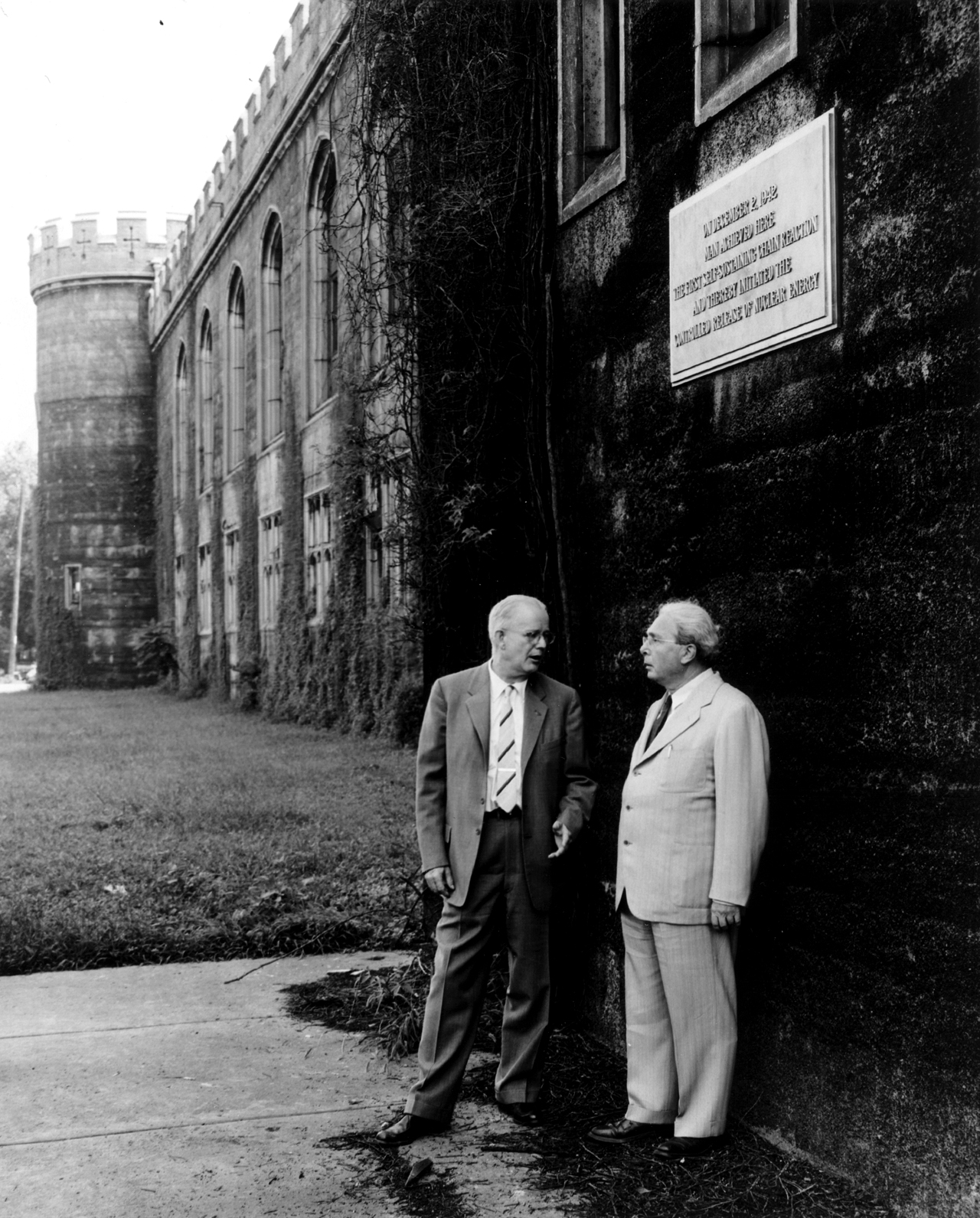
Norman Hilberry (left) and Leó Szilárd at Stagg Field, site of the first self-sustaining nuclear chain-reaction

There is no definitive origin for the term. United States Nuclear Regulatory Commission historian Tom Wellock notes that scram is English-language slang for leaving quickly and urgently (as in scrambling to get away), and he cites this as the original and most likely accurate basis for the use of scram in the technical context.

Scram is sometimes cited as being an acronym for safety control rod axe man or safety cut rope axe man. This was, according to urban legend, coined by Enrico Fermi when he oversaw the construction of the world's first nuclear reactor. The core, which was built under the spectator seating at the University of Chicago's Stagg Field, had an actual control rod tied to a rope with a man with an axe standing next to it; cutting the rope would mean the rods would fall by gravity into the reactor core, shutting the reactor down. The axe man at the first chain reaction was Norman Hilberry. In a letter to Raymond Murray (January 21, 1981), Hilberry wrote:

When I showed up on the balcony on that December 2, 1942 afternoon, I was ushered to the balcony rail, handed a well sharpened fireman's axe and told, "If the safety rods fail to operate, cut that manila rope." The safety rods, needless to say, worked, the rope was not cut... I don't believe I have ever felt quite as foolish as I did then. ...I did not get the SCRAM [Safety Control Rod Axe Man] story until many years after the fact. Then one day one of my fellows who had been on Zinn's construction crew called me Mr. Scram. I asked him, "How come?" And then the story.

Leona Marshall Libby, who was present that day at the Chicago Pile, recalled that the term was coined by Volney Wilson who led the team that designed the control rod circuitry:

The safety rods were coated with cadmium foil, and this metal absorbed so many neutrons that the chain reaction was stopped. Volney Wilson called these "scram" rods. He said that the pile had "scrammed," the rods had "scrammed" into the pile.

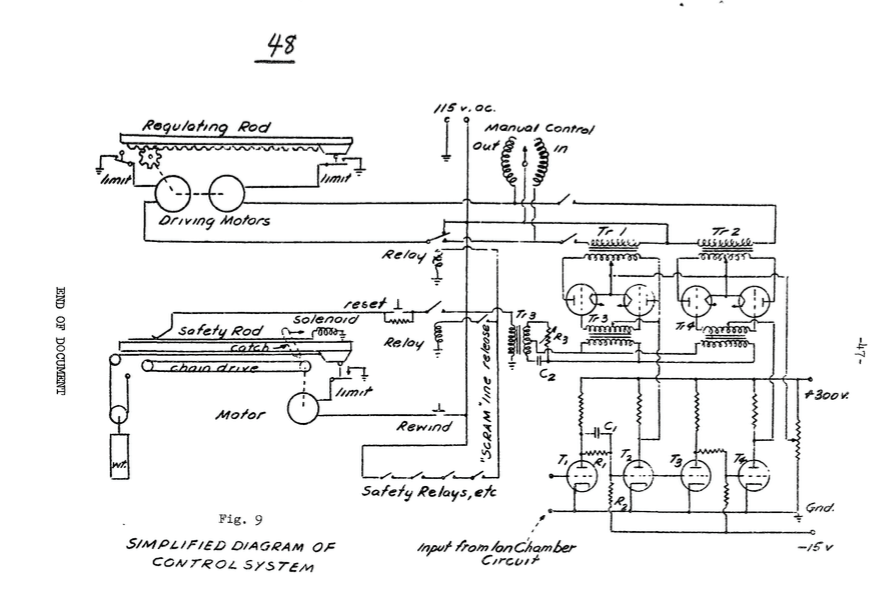
Control rod and SCRAM circuitry for the Chicago Pile-1

Other witnesses that day agreed with Libby's crediting "scram" to Wilson. Wellock wrote that Warren Nyer, a student who worked on assembling the pile, also attributed the word to Wilson: "The word arose in a discussion Dr. Wilson, who was head of the instrumentation and controls group, was having with several members of his group," Nyer wrote. "The group had decided to have a big button to push to drive in both the control rods and the safety rod. What to label it? 'What do we do after we punch the button?,' someone asked. 'Scram out of here!,' Wilson said. Bill Overbeck, another member of that group said, 'OK I'll label it SCRAM.'"

The earliest references to "scram" among the Chicago Pile team were also associated with Wilson's shutdown circuitry and not Hilberry. In a 1952 U.S. Atomic Energy Commission (AEC) report by Fermi, the AEC declassified information on the Chicago Pile. The report includes a section written by Wilson's team shortly after the Chicago Pile achieved a self-sustaining chain reaction on December 2, 1942. It includes a wiring schematic of the rod control circuitry with a clearly labeled "SCRAM" line (see image on the right and pages 37 and 48).

The Russian name, AZ-5 (АЗ-5, in Cyrillic), is an abbreviation for аварийная защита 5-й категории (avariynaya zashchita 5-y kategorii), which translates to "emergency protection of the 5th category" in English.

== Mechanisms ==
In any reactor, a scram is achieved by inserting large amounts of negative reactivity mass into the midst of the fissile material, to immediately terminate the fission reaction. In light-water reactors, this is achieved by inserting neutron-absorbing control rods into the core, although the mechanism by which rods are inserted depends on the type of reactor. In pressurized water reactors the control rods are held above a reactor's core by electric motors against both their own weight and a powerful spring. A scram is designed to release the control rods from those motors and allows their weight and the spring to drive them into the reactor core, rapidly halting the nuclear reaction by absorbing liberated neutrons. Another design uses electromagnets to hold the rods suspended, with any cut to the electric current resulting in an immediate and automatic control rod insertion.

In some boiling water reactor types, the control rods are inserted up from underneath the reactor vessel. In this case a hydraulic control unit with a pressurized storage tank provides the force to rapidly insert the control rods upon any interruption of the electric current. In both the PWR and the BWR there are secondary systems (and often even tertiary systems) that will insert control rods in the event that primary rapid insertion does not promptly and fully actuate.

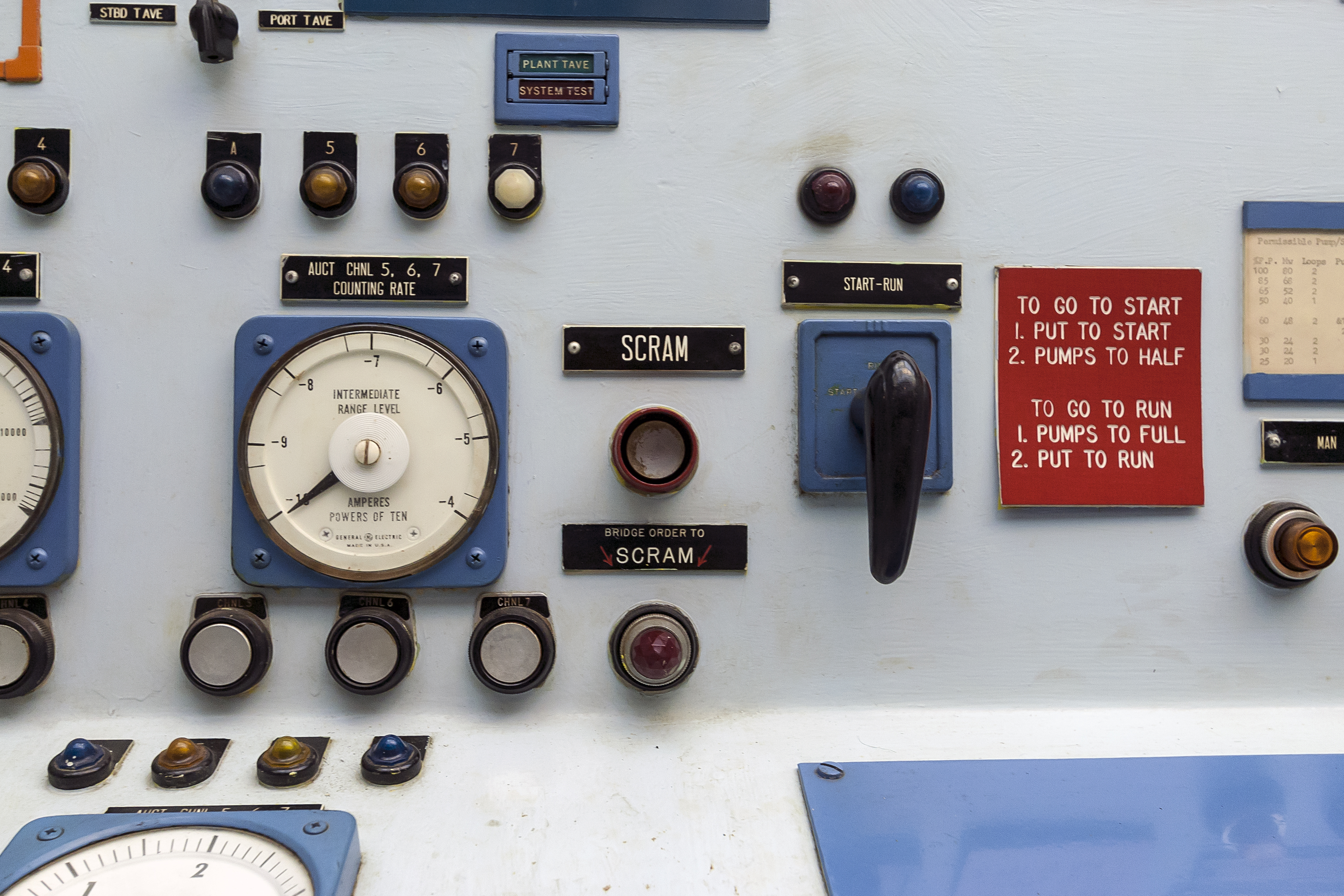
SCRAM button in the control room of the NS Savannah

Liquid neutron absorbers (neutron poisons) are also used in rapid shutdown systems for heavy and light water reactors. Following a scram, if the reactor (or section(s) thereof) are not below the shutdown margin (that is, they could return to a critical state due to insertion of positive reactivity from cooling, poison decay, or other uncontrolled conditions), the operators can inject solutions containing neutron poisons directly into the reactor coolant.

Neutron poison solutions are water-based solutions that contain chemicals that absorb neutrons, such as common household borax, sodium polyborate, boric acid, or gadolinium nitrate, causing a decrease in neutron multiplication, and thus shutting down the reactor without use of the control rods. In the PWR, these neutron-absorbing solutions are stored in pressurized tanks (called accumulators) that are attached to the primary coolant system via valves. A varying level of neutron absorbent is kept within the primary coolant at all times, and is increased using the accumulators in the event of a failure of all of the control rods to insert, which will promptly bring the reactor below the shutdown margin.

In the BWR, soluble neutron absorbers are found within the standby liquid control system, which uses redundant battery-operated injection pumps, or, in the latest models, high pressure nitrogen gas to inject the neutron absorber solution into the reactor vessel against any pressure within. Because they may delay the restart of a reactor, these systems are only used to shut down the reactor if control rod insertion fails. This concern is especially significant in a BWR, where injection of liquid boron would cause precipitation of solid boron compounds on fuel cladding, which would prevent the reactor from restarting until the boron deposits were removed.

In most reactor designs, the routine shutdown procedure also uses a scram to insert the control rods, as it is the most reliable method of completely inserting the control rods, and prevents the possibility of accidentally withdrawing them during or after the shutdown.

In a fusion reactor, there are multiple options for a so-called "plasma scram" system, including complete fuel cut-off and cryogenic impurity pellet bombardment.

== Reactor response ==
Most neutrons in a reactor are prompt neutrons; that is, neutrons produced directly by a fission reaction. These neutrons move at a high velocity, so they are likely to escape into the moderator before being captured. On average, it takes about 13 μs for the neutrons to be slowed by the moderator enough to facilitate a sustained reaction, which allows the insertion of neutron absorbers to affect the reactor quickly.

As a result, once the reactor has been scrammed, the reactor power will drop significantly almost instantaneously. A small fraction (about 0.65%) of neutrons in a typical power reactor comes from the radioactive decay of a fission product. These delayed neutrons, which are emitted at lower velocities, will limit the rate at which a nuclear reactor will shut down.

Due to flaws in its original control rod design, scramming an RBMK reactor could raise reactivity to dangerous levels before lowering it. This was noticed when it caused a power surge at the startup of Ignalina Nuclear Power Plant Unit number 1, in 1983. On April 26, 1986, the Chernobyl disaster happened due to a fatally flawed shutdown system, after the AZ-5 shutdown system was initiated after a core overheat. RBMK reactors were subsequently either retrofitted to account for the flaw, or decommissioned.

=== Decay heat ===
Not all of the heat in a nuclear reactor is generated by the chain reaction that a scram is designed to stop. For a reactor that is scrammed after holding a constant power level for an extended period (greater than 100 hrs), about 7% of the steady-state power will remain after initial shutdown due to fission product decay that cannot be stopped. For a reactor that has not had a constant power history, the exact percentage is determined by the concentrations and half-lives of the individual fission products in the core at the time of the scram.

The power produced by decay heat decreases as the fission products decay, but it is large enough that failure to remove decay heat may cause the reactor core temperature to rise to dangerous levels and has caused nuclear accidents, including the nuclear accidents at Three Mile Island and Fukushima I.

== See also ==
- Iodine pit – Problem in nuclear reactor start-up
- Kill switch – Safety mechanism to quickly shut down a system
- Nuclear reactor – Device for controlled nuclear reactions
- Nuclear reactor safety system – Nuclear safety systems in the USA
- Sergey Preminin – Soviet Russian sailor (1965–1986), posthumously awarded the title of Hero of the Russian Federation for performing a manual SCRAM on board the submarine K-219 in 1986
- Chernobyl disaster – 1986 nuclear accident in the Soviet Union
