= Nikolai Vladimirovich Zateyev =

Soviet submarine commander

- Николай Владимирович Затеев
- Zateyev in 1962, as a captain first rank
- Born: June 30, 1926; Nizhni Novgorod, Russian SFSR, Soviet Union
- Died: August 28, 1998 (aged 72); Moscow, Russian Federation
- Military career
- Allegiance: Soviet Union
- Branch: Soviet Army; Soviet Navy
- Service years: 1943–1986
- Rank: Captain First Rank
- Commands: K-19
- Awards: Order of the Red Banner; Order for Service to the Homeland in the Armed Forces of the USSR; Order for Personal Courage
- Other work: Author

Nikolai Vladimirovich Zateyev (Russian: Николай Владимирович Затеев; c. June 30, 1926 – 28 August 1998) was a Russian submariner and a Captain First Rank in the Soviet Navy, notable as the commander of the ill-fated Soviet submarine K-19 in July 1961 during the Hotel class submarine's nuclear-reactor coolant leak. Zateyev and the actions of his crew managed to avert disaster, despite severe radiation exposure. After the event, Zateyev and his crew were sworn to secrecy by the Soviet government regarding the events that transpired, and were only permitted to reveal the story after its collapse. Zateyev later released his memoirs on the event, which were used as the basis for a number of literary works on the disaster, as well as a 2002 documentary and film. In these memoirs, Zateyev criticised the rushed production of Russia's first nuclear ballistic missile submarine. He and his crew's actions on July 4, 1961, earned the surviving crewmembers a joint nomination for the Nobel Peace Prize in March 2006.

== Early life and career ==
Zateyev was born in Nizhny Novgorod. He was drafted into the Red Army in 1943, and studied in the Baku Naval Preparatory School. He passed the navigator course and was commissioned from the M.V. Frunze Higher Naval School in Leningrad. In the late 1940s he joined the Black Sea Fleet and served on submarines first as navigation officer and then rose through the position of executive officer. In 1954 he completed the Advanced Special Officers' Course and was given command of his own submarine. For the excellent gunnery performance of his submarine he was rewarded by an early promotion by order of the Defence Minister, Marshal Zhukov. In 1958 he was transferred to the Northern Fleet and was given command of the new submarine K-19 when it was commissioned.

== K-19 ==
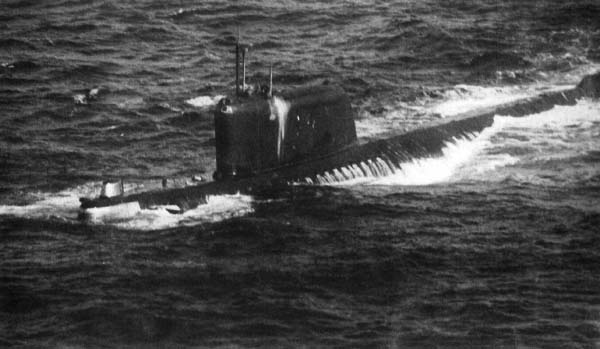
K-19. Photo taken by a circling U.S. Navy helicopter.

On July 4, 1961, while K-19 was operating near southern Greenland, water pressure in the starboard nuclear reactor plummeted due to a coolant leak in an area of the reactor very difficult to access. The loss of coolant caused the reactor to begin to overheat, endangering the integrity of the control rods. Zateyev mistakenly believed this could lead to a nuclear explosion. The captain believed that such an explosion would damage a nearby NATO base and could cause a nuclear war between the Soviet Union and the United States. Mikhail Gorbachev later wrote that "An explosion on board the K-19 could have been taken for a military provocation or even an attempt to launch a nuclear strike on the North American coast. An immediate response by the United States and NATO could have triggered off a Third World War." Eight crewmen died in the days that followed July 4, after working in the reactor compartment. However, a jury-rigged coolant system successfully averted any catastrophe. The K-19 was later towed back to harbor and its reactors were replaced over a period of two years.

Following the incident, Zateyev and the crew were instructed to keep silent about the accident, and neither the replacement crew for the K-19 nor the families of those who had died were notified. The victims of radiation poisoning were buried in lead coffins at sea, according to the letter written by Mikhail Gorbachev to the Norwegian Nobel Committee in 2006. Only in 1990 were the survivors (of which there were 56 by February 1, 2006) permitted to speak.

Zateyev was subsequently employed on shore. From 1962 to 1965, he studied at the Naval Academy in Leningrad, and was subsequently employed as a department head at the Leningrad Naval Base and at naval headquarters in Moscow. In 1972, he was head of the navy trials department responsible for the acceptance of new ships from the shipyards. He retired in 1986, and after 1990, he was actively involved in Soviet Navy veterans' affairs. He died in 1998 from a disease of the lungs, and is buried in Moscow next to some of his comrades from the K-19.

== In popular culture ==
The character Captain Alexei Vostrikov played by Harrison Ford in the 2002 film K-19: The Widowmaker is based on Zateyev.
