= Hostile Waters (film) =

1997 British television film

- Cover of 1998 BBC VHS release of the film
- Written by: Troy Kennedy Martin
- Directed by: David Drury
- Music by: David Ferguson
- Country of origin: United Kingdom
- Original language: English

Production
- Running time: 94 minutes

Original release
- Network: BBC One
- Release: 26 July 1997

Hostile Waters is a British 1997 television film about the loss of the Soviet Navy's K-219, a Yankee I class nuclear ballistic missile sub. The film stars Rutger Hauer as the commander of K-219 and claims to be based on the true story, also described in the 1997 book of the same name. The film was produced by World Productions for the BBC and HBO, in association with Invision Productions and UFA Filmproduktions. It was written by Troy Kennedy Martin and directed by David Drury, and was first transmitted on BBC One on 26 July 1997.

== Plot ==
In 1986, the Soviet Navy submarine K-219 performs a Crazy Ivan, and USS Aurora collides with her, causing a rupture of the seal on one of its ballistic missile tubes. The leaking seawater causes a corrosive reaction which floods the sub with toxic gas. The corrosive reaction starts a fire that floods the sub with more toxic gas and smoke.

The captain surfaces the boat, moves the crew out to the deck, and attempts to vent the sub. The chief engineer informs the captain that the fire may cook off the nukes and cause a nuclear explosion. The launch doors are opened on the sub to vent smoke.

Aurora ascertains that a fire is aboard K-219, and informs the Pentagon. The Pentagon, fearing radiological contamination of the Eastern Seaboard, orders Aurora to prepare to sink K-219. The fact that the launch doors are open on the SLBMs causes consternation in Washington D.C., with calls for the immediate sinking of the sub, should it appear to be preparing to launch.

The captain of K-219 prepares a bold plan to dive with the launch doors open, to flood the missile bay and quench the fires. As the captain dives the sub, Aurora prepares to fire, assuming K-219 is setting about to launch its missiles. After a brief but heated argument the U.S. commander is convinced to wait before launching and realises that the Soviet sub is diving, rather than launching its SLBMs.

K-219's tactic works, and the sub resurfaces with the fires out. A new crisis develops: Both nuclear reactors are overheating, and the cooling rods must be lowered manually by two crew members who have only limited oxygen left. The rods are lowered, and both reactors are shut down, averting disaster, but one crew member remains locked inside the reactor room, running out of oxygen. With seawater flooding the submarine, the captain of K-219 decides to abandon ship. Throughout the crisis, Washington insists that no information on the possibility of nuclear fallout along the eastern American coastline be leaked to the Governors and no evacuation plans be activated to protect the population, in order not to derail the forthcoming Reykjavik Summit between Soviet leader Mikhail Gorbachev and U.S. President Ronald Reagan.

Capt. Britanov and his surviving crew members return safely to Moscow with some crew decorated and he being dismissed from the navy. The Reykjavik Summit takes place as planned.

The film's postscript details that as a legacy almost a decade after the end of the Cold War, fifty one nuclear warheads and seven nuclear reactors from nuclear submarines litter the North Atlantic ocean floor.

== Cast ==
- Rutger Hauer as Captain Igor Britanov
- Martin Sheen as Aurora Skipper
- Max von Sydow as Admiral Chernavin
- Colm Feore as Pshenishny
- Rob Campbell as Sergei Preminin
- Harris Yulin as Admiral Quinn
- Regina Taylor as Lieutenant Curtis
- John Rothman as Aurora Executive Officer
- Michael Attwell as Kuzmenko
- Dominic Monaghan as Sasha
- Peter Guinness as Vladimirov
- James E. Kerr as Aznabaev
- Alexis Denisof as John Baker
- Seamus McQuade as Helmsman
- Paul Birchard as Torpedo Chief
- Oliver Marlo as Doctor
- Mark Drewry as Petrachkov
- Denzil Kilvington as Volnigbirov
- Garry Cooper as Gennady
- Frank Baker as Pumps
- Richard Graham as Belikov
- Joachim Paul Assböck as Tigran Gasparian
- Alexander Wachholz as Martinov
- David King as Admiral 2nd Class
- Todd Boyce as Larry Brock
- Michael Shannon as Admiral
- Sanja Spengler as Britanov's Wife
- Philip Martin Brown as Cook
- J.J. Gordon as Officer 4
- Lawrence Elman as Officer
- Erik Hansen as Naval Marshall
- William Marsh as Acoustics Officer
- Rainer Sellien as Technician
- Norbert Tefelski as Admiral / Engineer
- Felix zu Knyphausen as Sonar Operator
- Frank Witter as Russian Submarine Soldier (uncredited)

== Development ==
The film was Troy Kennedy Martin's first work for British television in 12 years, since Edge of Darkness. HBO's involvement made the project financially possible, but the US network required American characters to be at the centre of the film, though without any named after real Americans, for fear of potential legal action: Kennedy Martin's script went through ten versions. The American submarine involved (in the film's version of events), the Augusta, is called the Aurora in the film.

== Reception ==
The film screened at 9pm on BBC One on 26 July 1997. Ahead of broadcast, the United States Navy's chief of information denied the story of a collision with K-219: "The US Navy normally does not comment on submarine operations, but in this case, because the scenario is so outrageous, the US Navy is compelled to respond."

John Preston wrote a highly positive review for The Sunday Telegraph: "it had a terrific cast, must have cost a fortune to make and proved to be the most gripping thing I've seen since – since Edge of Darkness". He called Hauer "better than he's been in decades". In a tongue-in-cheek review, Jim Shelley in The Guardian also praised Hauer's performance: "Rutger saunters through it all with considerable aplomb, bestowing upon even his most staccato speeches a kind of suave grandeur, like Clark Gable in The Misfits." The Sunday Times was dismissive: "Given the scale of the crisis and the nautical setting, the language is incredibly mild. However, a few days spent studying nuclear physics and post-war submarine design prior to viewing may increase enjoyment."

HBO screened the film a few hours later, at 9pm. Variety wrote that "the characters are simplistically drawn, which, for this genre, is not necessarily a bad thing" but praised Hauer's acting and the technical aspects. The New York Times wrote that it delivered "first-rate dramatic tension. Mr. Hauer is quietly powerful as Captain Britanov... Nothing much happens on the American sub, so Martin Sheen's role as its captain consists mainly of looking worried. But he does it with thrilling understatement".

== Lawsuit ==
Igor Britanov himself took out a lawsuit against HBO's parent company Warner Bros., alleging that the film-makers had not sought his permission to portray him and that the film made him look incompetent. After three years of hearings, in 2004 an American court found in his favour and awarded him damages: Britanov declined to say how much, but Russian media reported this as tens of thousands of dollars. In a statement, Britanov said: "A submarine with open hatches would sink to the bottom like a stone and I'm already sick of explaining to my submariner colleagues that I did nothing of the sort".
