= Igor Britanov =

Soviet submarine commander

Captain Second Rank Igor Anatolievich Britanov, Soviet Navy was the captain of the Soviet missile submarine K-219 when it sank off the coast of Bermuda on October 3, 1986.

== The incident on K-219 ==
That day, while on patrol 680 miles (1,090 km) northeast of Bermuda, K-219 suffered an explosion and fire in a missile tube. The seal in a missile hatch cover failed, allowing seawater to leak into the missile tube and react with residue from the missile's liquid fuel. According to one press version, the Soviet Navy claimed that the leak was caused by a collision with USS Augusta (SSN-710). Augusta was certainly operating in proximity, but the United States Navy denies any collision. K-219 had previously experienced a similar casualty; one of her missile tubes was already disabled and welded shut.

Britanov was ordered to have his ship towed to Gadzhievo, her homeport, which was 7,000 kilometers (about 4,300 miles) away. The attempts to tow the ship were unsuccessful, and poison gas began to leak in the aft compartments. Against orders, Britanov ordered the crew evacuated to the towing ship, while he remained onboard K-219. Seeing that Britanov - in their judgement - was not acting efficiently enough, the Soviet Navy's high command ordered the security officer, Valery Pshenichnyy, to assume command and resume the patrol. Before that order could be carried out, K-219 sank to the bottom of the Hatteras Abyss. The cause is unknown, but a version presumes that Britanov may have scuttled the ship.

Upon his return to the Soviet Union, Britanov was dismissed from the Soviet Navy and charged with negligence, treason and sabotage. While waiting for his trial in Sverdlovsk in May 1987, Defense Minister Sergey Sokolov resigned and was replaced by Dmitry Yazov; subsequently, the charges against Britanov were dropped.

=== Not a collision? ===
The Soviet Union - and by some accounts apparently to this day, the Russian government - claimed that the K-219 collided with Augusta off the coast of Bermuda, and that is what resulted in the sinking of the submarine. The United States Navy has denied this, and - surprisingly - so has Britanov himself. In an interview with Lt. Cmdr. Wayne Grasdock on August 5, 1998, Britanov stated that in the eyes of the Russian government, there were no heroes on K-219. When asked how many times he was invited to be a guest speaker at Russian functions, he replied he was not invited at all. "I do not tell the story the way my government wants me to tell it," Britanov explained. "I did not collide with an American sub.”

== The Hostile Waters controversy ==
In 1997, a film of the incident called Hostile Waters was released by Warner Brothers, starring Rutger Hauer as Captain Britanov. In 2001, the real Captain Britanov filed suit against the studio, claiming they did not have his permission to use his story or his character and that he was portrayed by the writers as incompetent - though reportedly, he approved of Hauer's portrayal. In 2004, the courts decided in Britanov's favor, though he declined to state the exact dollar value of the damages.

== See also ==
- Soviet submarine K-219
