= USS Augusta (SSN-710) =

Los Angeles-class nuclear-powered attack submarine of the US Navy

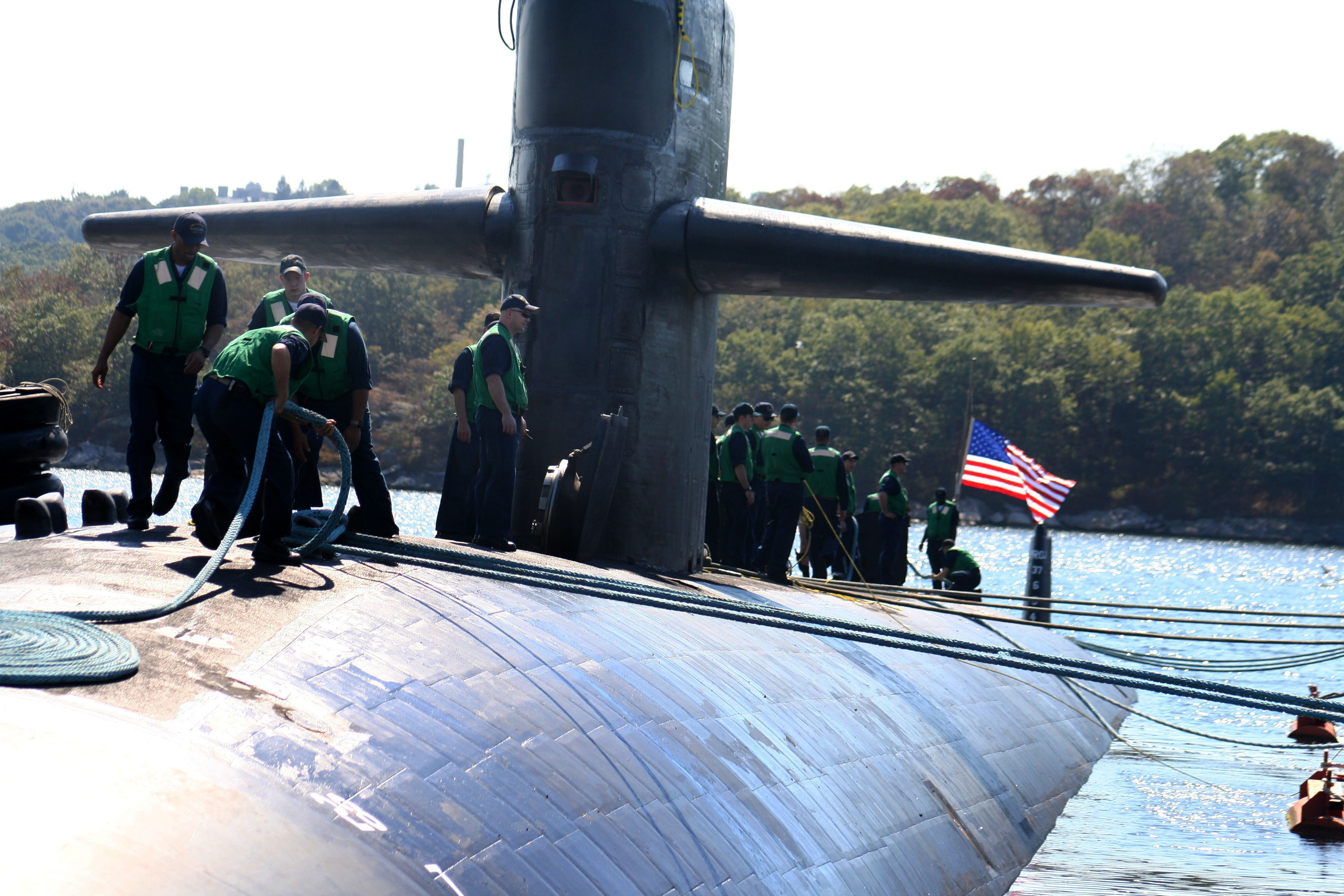

History

United States
- Namesake: Augusta, Maine
- Awarded: 10 December 1973
- Builder: General Dynamics Corporation
- Laid down: 1 April 1983
- Launched: 21 January 1984
- Acquired: 5 December 1984
- Commissioned: 19 January 1985
- Decommissioned: 11 February 2009
- Stricken: 11 February 2009
- Home port: Groton, Connecticut
- Motto: Protecting The Frontier Since 1754 "Any Mission, Any Time"
- Nickname(s): "Gussie"
- Honors and awards: Arctic Service, Navy Expeditionary, Battle "E", Navy Unit Commendation, Global War On Terrorism Expeditionary, Global War On Terrorism Service, Sea Service
- Fate: Recycling completed on November 30, 2021
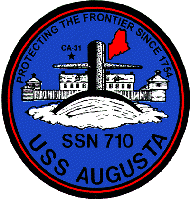
- Badge

General characteristics
- Class & type: Los Angeles-class submarine
- Displacement: 5,786 tons light, 6,927 tons full, 378 tons dead
- Length: 110.3 m (361 ft 11 in)
- Beam: 10 m (32 ft 10 in)
- Draft: 9.7 m (31 ft 10 in)
- Propulsion: S6G nuclear reactor
- Speed: Surfaced: 20 knots (23 mph; 37 km/h); Submerged: +20 knots (23 mph; 37 km/h) (official)
- Complement: 15 officers, 115 enlisted
- Sensors & processing systems: BQQ-5 passive sonar, BQS-15 detecting and ranging sonar, WLR-8 fire control radar receiver, WLR-9 acoustic receiver for detection of active search sonar and acoustic homing torpedoes, BRD-7 radio direction finder
- Armament: 4 × 21 in (533 mm) bow tubes, 10 Mk48 ADCAP torpedo reloads, Tomahawk land attack missile block 3 SLCM range 1,700 nautical miles (3,100 km), Harpoon anti–surface ship missile range 70 nautical miles (130 km), mine laying Mk67 mobile Mk60 captor mines

Service record
- Operations: Iraq War (2003)

USS Augusta (SSN-710), a Los Angeles-class submarine, was the first ship of the United States Navy to be named for Augusta, Maine. The contract to build her was awarded to the Electric Boat Division of General Dynamics Corporation in Groton, Connecticut on 31 October 1973 and her keel was laid down on 1 April 1983. She was launched on 21 January 1984 sponsored by Mrs. Diana D. Cohen, wife of U.S. Senator William Cohen and commissioned on 19 January 1985.

== 1986 collision ==
The Department of Defense reported that Augusta required $2.7 million worth of repairs due to damage in an undersea collision while on a routine training patrol. On 31 October 1986 Augusta entered dry-dock at Electric Boat to have her sonar dome replaced and the repairs were completed on 13 December 1986.

The Soviet Navy claims that on 3 October 1986, Augusta collided with the 667AU Nalim (Yankee-I) class ballistic missile submarine K-219, commanded by Igor Britanov, off the coast of Bermuda. The U.S. Navy states that K-219 was disabled by an internal explosion.

CBS news reported that Augusta "very possibly" collided with a Soviet submarine.

== Later service ==
In July 1987, Augusta began service as a trials boat for the BQG-5D Wide Aperture Array (WAA) passive sonar system and carrying the prototype BQQ-10 ARCI sonars, which incorporate off-the-shelf computer components, allowing easy introduction of modular upgrades.

In 2003, Augusta was part of a small group of submarines participating in Tomahawk Strikes against Iraq in the opening of Operation Iraqi Freedom. The boat successfully launched missiles against all assigned missions leaving the theater with 100% completion.

Augusta underwent extensive maintenance during 2006 to prepare for six-month deployment in 2007, which began in March and completed in September. Augusta changed her homeport to Norfolk Naval Shipyard, where she began decommissioning in January 2008, and completed the disassembly of her reactor on 24 November 2008. On November 30, 2021, this ship completed its scrapping.
