= Soviet submarine K-219 =

Navaga-class ballistic missile submarine

Coordinates: 31°25′N 54°42′W

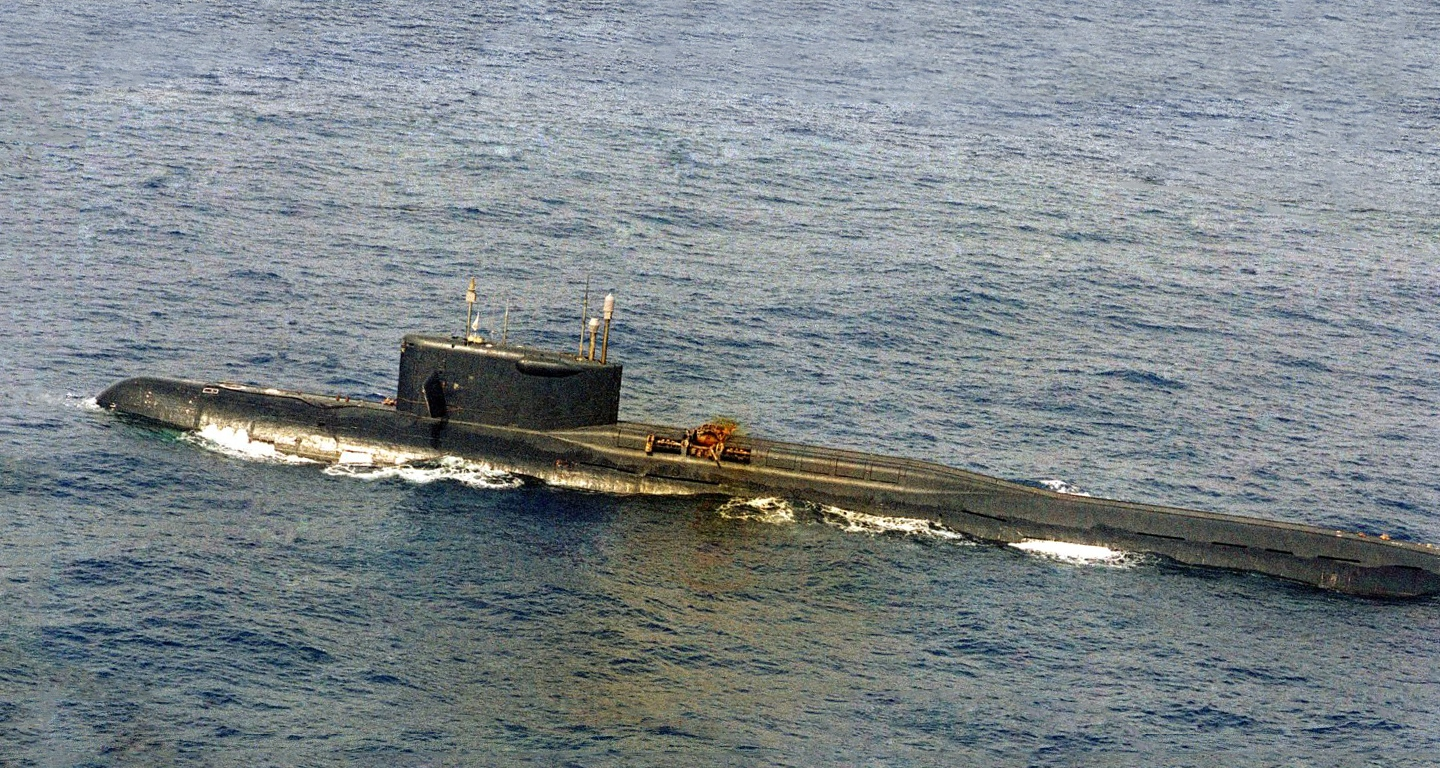
- US Navy photo of K-219 on the surface after suffering a fire in a missile tube

History

Soviet Union
- Name: K-219
- Laid down: 28 May 1970
- Launched: 8 October 1971
- Commissioned: 31 December 1971
- Stricken: 1986
- Home port: Gadzhiyevo
- Fate: Sunk by explosion and fire caused by seawater leak in missile tube, 3 October 1986

General characteristics
- Class & type: Yankee-class submarine
- Displacement: 7,766 long tons (7,891 t) surfaced; 9,300 long tons (9,449 t) submerged
- Length: 129.8 m (425 ft 10 in)
- Beam: 11.7 m (38 ft 5 in)
- Draft: 8.7 m (28 ft 7 in)
- Propulsion: 2 × 90 MWt OK-700 reactors with VM-4 cores producing 20,000 hp (15 MW) each
- Speed: 26 knots (48 km/h; 30 mph)
- Test depth: 400 m (1,300 ft)
- Complement: 120 officers and men
- Armament: 4 × 21 in (533 mm) torpedo tubes; 2 × 16 in (406 mm) torpedo tubes; 16 × SLBM launch tubes

K-219 was a Project 667A Navaga-class ballistic missile submarine (NATO reporting name Yankee I) of the Soviet Navy. It carried 16 R-27U liquid-fuel missiles powered by UDMH with nitrogen tetroxide (NTO). K-219 was involved in what has become one of the most controversial submarine incidents during the Cold War on 3 October 1986. The 15-year-old vessel, which was on an otherwise routine Cold War nuclear deterrence patrol in the North Atlantic 1,090 kilometres (680 mi) northeast of Bermuda, suffered an explosion and fire in a missile tube. While underway, a submerged seal in a missile hatch cover failed, allowing high-pressure seawater to enter the missile tube and owing to the pressure differential ruptured the missile fuel tanks, allowing the missile's liquid fuel to mix and ultimately combust. Though there was no official announcement, the Soviet Union claimed the leak was caused by a collision with the submarine USS Augusta. Although Augusta was operating within the area, both the United States Navy and the commander of K-219, Captain Second Rank Igor Britanov, deny that a collision took place. The submarine sank on 6 October 1986 with approximately 30 nuclear warheads aboard.

The incident was novelized in the book Hostile Waters, which reconstructed the incident from descriptions by the survivors, ships' logs, the official investigations, and participants both ashore and afloat from the Soviet and the American sides.

== Explosion ==
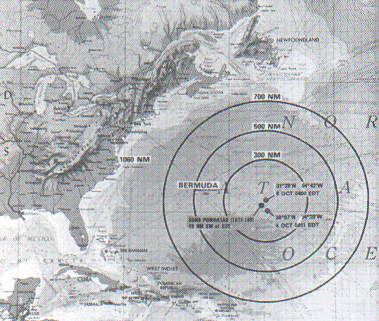
Location of the incident

Shortly after 0530 Moscow time, seawater leaking into silo six of K-219 reacted with missile fuel, producing chlorine and nitrogen dioxide gases and sufficient heat to explosively decompose additional fuming nitric acid to produce more nitrogen dioxide gas. K-219 weapons officer Alexander Petrachkov attempted to deal with this by disengaging the hatch cover and venting the missile tube to the sea. Shortly after 0532, an explosion occurred in the silo. K-219 had previously experienced a similar event; one of her missile tubes was already disabled and welded shut, having been permanently sealed after an explosion caused by reaction between seawater leaking into the silo and missile fuel residue.

An article in Undersea Warfare by Captain First Rank, Igor Kurdin, Russian Navy – K-219's previous XO (executive officer) – and Lieutenant Commander Wayne Grasdock, USN described the explosion occurrence as follows:

At 0514, the BCh-2 officer and the hold machinist/engineer in compartment IV (the forward missile compartment) discovered water dripping from under the plug of missile tube No. 6 (the third tube from the bow on the port side). During precompression of the plug, the drips turned into a stream. The BCh-2 officer reported water in missile tube No. 6, and at 0525, the captain ordered an ascent to a safe depth (46 meters, 151 ft) while a pump was started in an attempt to dry out missile tube No. 6. At 0532, brown clouds of oxidant began issuing from under the missile-tube plug, and the BCh-2 officer declared an accident alert in the compartment and reported the situation to the GKP (main control post). Although personnel assigned to other compartments left the space, nine people remained in compartment IV. The captain declared an accident alert. It took the crew no more than one minute to carry out initial damage control measures, which included hermetically sealing all compartments. Five minutes later, at 0538, an explosion occurred in missile tube No. 6.

Two sailors were killed outright in the explosion, and a third died soon afterward from toxic gas poisoning. Through a breach in the hull, the vessel immediately started taking on seawater, quickly sinking from its original depth of 40 meters (130 ft) to eventually reaching a depth of over 300 meters (980 ft). Sealing all of the compartments and full engagement of the seawater pumps in the stricken compartments enabled the depth to be stabilized.

Up to 25 sailors were trapped in a sealed section, and it was only after a conference with his incident specialists that the captain allowed the chief engineer to open the hatch and save the 25 lives. It could be seen from instruments that although the nuclear reactor should have automatically been shut down, it was not. Lt. Nikolai Belikov, one of the reactor control officers, entered the reactor compartment but ran out of oxygen after turning just one of the four rod assemblies on the first reactor, forcing him to evacuate. Belikov then reentered with twenty-year-old enlisted seaman Sergei Preminin as support, shutting down the remaining three rod assemblies. However, they were forced to evacuate again due to heat and exhaustion, leaving the four assembly rods from the second reactor still active. Despite his exhaustion, Preminin then volunteered to single-handedly shut down the second reactor by following the instructions of the chief engineer. Working with a full-face gas mask, he succeeded, averting any potential meltdown. However, when Preminin tried to exit the reactor compartment, he found that the door would not open. A large fire had developed within the compartment, raising the pressure inside compared to that outside. The resulting pressure difference trapped Preminin inside the reactor compartment, where he eventually died of asphyxiation. For his actions, Sergei Preminin was posthumously awarded the title Hero of the Russian Federation.

In a nuclear safe condition, and with sufficient stability to allow it to surface, Captain Britanov surfaced K-219 on battery power alone. He was then ordered to have the ship towed by a Soviet freighter back to her home port of Gadzhiyevo, 7,000 kilometres (4,300 mi) away. Although a towline was attached, towing attempts were unsuccessful, and after subsequent poison gas leaks into the final aft compartments and against orders, Britanov ordered the crew to evacuate onto the towing ship, but remained aboard K-219 himself.

Displeased with Britanov's inability to repair his submarine and continue his patrol, Moscow ordered Valery Pshenichny, K-219's security officer, to assume command, transfer the surviving crew back to the submarine, and return to duty. Before those orders could be carried out the flooding reached a point beyond recovery and on 6 October 1986 K-219 sank to the bottom of the Hatteras Abyssal Plain at a depth of about 6,000 m (20,000 ft). Britanov abandoned ship shortly before the sinking. K-219's full complement of nuclear weapons was lost along with the vessel.

=== Aftermath ===
Preminin was posthumously awarded the Order of the Red Star for his bravery in securing the reactors. Britanov was charged with negligence, sabotage, and treason. He was never imprisoned, but waited for his trial in Sverdlovsk. On 30 May 1987, Defense Minister Sergey Sokolov was dismissed as a result of the Mathias Rust incident two days earlier, and replaced by Dmitry Yazov; the charges against Britanov were subsequently dismissed.

== In popular culture ==
In 1997, the British BBC television film Hostile Waters, co-produced with HBO and starring Rutger Hauer, Martin Sheen, and Max von Sydow, was released in the United States by Warner Bros. It was based on the book by the same name, which claimed to describe the loss of K-219. In 2001, Captain Britanov filed suit, claiming Warner Bros. did not seek or get his permission to use his story or his character, and that the film did not portray the events accurately and made him look incompetent. After three years of hearing, the court ruled in Britanov's favor. Russian media reported that the filmmaker paid a settlement totaling under $100,000.

After the release of the movie, the U.S. Navy issued the following statement regarding both the book and the movie:

The United States Navy normally does not comment on submarine operations, but in the [sic] case, because the scenario is so outrageous, the Navy is compelled to respond. The United States Navy categorically denies that any U.S. submarine collided with the Soviet Yankee-class submarine K-219 or that the Navy had anything to do with the cause of the casualty that resulted in the loss of the Soviet Yankee-class submarine.

An article on the U.S. Navy's website posted by Captain 1st Rank (Ret.) Igor Kurdin (former XO of K-219) and Lieutenant Commander Wayne Grasdock denied any collision between K-219 and Augusta. Captain Britanov also denies a collision, and he has stated that he was not asked to be a guest speaker at Russian functions, because he refuses to follow the Russian government's interpretation of the K-219 incident.

In a BBC interview recorded in February 2013, Admiral of the Fleet Vladimir Chernavin, the Commander-in-Chief of the Soviet Navy at the time of the K-219 incident, says the accident was caused by a malfunction in a missile tube, and makes no mention of a collision with an American submarine. The interview was conducted for the BBC2 series The Silent War.

== See also ==
- List of sunken nuclear submarines

== Notes ==
=== Bibliography ===
- Книга памяти – К-219 (in Russian)
- Huchthausen, Peter; Kurdin, Igor; White, R. Alan (1997), Hostile Waters, London: St. Martin's Press, ISBN 0-312-96612-1
- Kurdin, Igor; Grasdock, Wayne (Fall 2005). "Loss of a Yankee SSBN". Undersea Warfare. 7 (5). Archived from the original on 23 July 2013.
- Offley, Edward (2007), Scorpion Down: Sunk by the Soviets, Buried by the Pentagon: The Untold Story of the USS Scorpion, Westview Press, ISBN 978-0465-05186-1
- Ramana, M. V.; Reddy, C. Rammanohar (2003), Prisoners of the Nuclear Dream, Orient Longman, ISBN 978-81-250-2477-4
