= K-19: The Widowmaker =

2002 film by Kathryn Bigelow

- Theatrical release poster
- Directed by: Kathryn Bigelow
- Screenplay by: Christopher Kyle
- Story by: Louis Nowra
- Produced by: Kathryn Bigelow; Edward S. Feldman; Sigurjón Sighvatsson; Christine Whitaker; Matthias Deyle
- Starring: Harrison Ford; Liam Neeson; Peter Sarsgaard
- Cinematography: Jeff Cronenweth
- Edited by: Walter Murch
- Music by: Klaus Badelt
- Production companies: Intermedia Films; National Geographic Films; Palomar Pictures; First Light
- Distributed by: Paramount Pictures (United States, United Kingdom and Canada); Constantin Film (Germany)
- Release dates: July 19, 2002 (United States); September 5, 2002 (Germany); October 25, 2002 (United Kingdom)
- Running time: 138 minutes
- Countries: United States; United Kingdom; Germany; Canada; Russia
- Language: English
- Budget: $90–100 million
- Box office: $65.7 million

K-19: The Widowmaker is a 2002 historical submarine film directed and produced by Kathryn Bigelow, and produced by Edward S. Feldman, Sigurjon Sighvatsson, Christine Whitaker and Matthias Deyle with a screenplay by Christopher Kyle. An international co-production of the United States, United Kingdom, Germany and Canada, the film takes place in 1961 and focuses its story on the Soviet Hotel-class submarine K-19.

The film stars Harrison Ford and Liam Neeson alongside Peter Sarsgaard, Joss Ackland, Donald Sumpter, Christian Camargo, Michael Gladis and John Shrapnel in supporting roles.

K-19: The Widowmaker was released by Paramount Pictures in the United States on July 19, 2002, in Germany on September 5, 2002, and in the United Kingdom on October 25, 2002. The film received mixed reviews upon release, with critics praising the performances and dramatic atmosphere, but criticizing the screenplay. The film was also a box-office bomb, grossing only $65.7 million worldwide on a budget of $90 million.

== Plot ==
During the nuclear arms race in 1961, the Soviet Union possesses enough missiles to destroy the world twice-over, the United States ten times over, and they continue to build more. American nuclear submarines patrol near Leningrad and Moscow. Leaders of both nations believe war is a foregone conclusion only a question of when and who will preemptively attack.

The Soviet Union launches its first nuclear-powered ballistic missile submarine, the K-19, commanded by Captain Alexei Vostrikov, with executive officer Mikhail Polenin, the crew's original captain. Vostrikov is alleged to have been appointed through his wife's political connections, and because of Polenin's tendency to put crew morale and safety before Soviet pride. Discovering the reactor officer drunk and asleep on duty, Vostrikov fires him, receiving a replacement, Vadim Radtchenko, fresh from the academy. The launch is plagued by misfortune; the inaugural bottle of champagne fails to break on the bow and the medical officer is killed by a truck.

The K-19's first mission is to surface in the Arctic, test-fire an unarmed intercontinental ballistic missile, and patrol the Atlantic within striking range of New York City and Washington, D.C. Vostrikov orders K-19 to submerge past its maximum operational depth, then surface at full-speed to break through the Arctic pack-ice. Protesting the dangerous maneuver, Polenin storms off the bridge. The test missile launches successfully.

A reactor coolant pipe bursts. Control rods are inserted into the reactor, but the temperature rises; back-up coolant systems were not installed. K-19 surfaces to contact fleet command but the long-range transmitter antenna cable is damaged. Engineers rig a makeshift coolant system, working in shifts to limit radiation exposure. The first team emerges vomiting and blistered. The second and third teams cool the reactor, but all suffer radiation poisoning. With radiation levels rising, the submarine surfaces and most of the crew are ordered topside. Radtchenko balks after seeing the first team's injuries, and the crew chief takes his place on the third team.

A Sikorsky H-34 helicopter from a nearby United States Navy destroyer offers assistance, which Vostrikov rejects. The Soviet government grows concerned when the K-19 ceases contact but is spotted near the destroyer. Hoping diesel submarines will be sent to tow the K-19, Vostrikov orders a return to port. The repaired pipework leaks causing the reactor temperature to rise. Torpedo fuel ignites a fire. Initially ordering the fire suppression system activated which would suffocate anyone in the area Vostrikov is talked down by Polenin, who personally assists the fire crew. Two officers mutiny against Vostrikov, and Radtchenko enters the reactor alone to attempt repairs.

Polenin deceives the mutineers into handing over their weapons, arrests them, and frees Vostrikov. Unaware of Radtchenko, Vostrikov, at Polenin's behest, announces his plan to dive and attempt another repair, fearing an overheating reactor could set off their warheads and incite nuclear war. The crew responds positively, and K-19 dives. Radtchenko's repairs are successful. Blinded and weakened by the radiation, he is dragged to safety by Vostrikov. A meltdown is prevented, but irradiated steam leaks throughout the submarine.

A Soviet diesel submarine reaches K-19, with orders to confine the crew aboard until a freighter can pick them up. Vostrikov instead orders an evacuation. Returning to the Soviet Union, Vostrikov is tried for endangering the mission and disobeying a direct order, but Polenin comes to his defense. Captain Vostrikov is acquitted, although he can never again command a submarine, and surviving crew are sworn to secrecy in perpetuity. The seven crewmen who repaired the reactor die from radiation exposure shortly after returning home – twenty more will die a few short years later.

Epilogue: Twenty-eight years later in 1989 after the fall of the Berlin Wall and the decline of communism, surviving K-19 comrades break their silence. An aged Vostrikov meets Polenin and other survivors at a cemetery on the anniversary of their rescue. Vostrikov reveals that he nominated the deceased crewmen for the Hero of the Soviet Union award, but was told the honor was reserved for combat veterans. Remarking "what good are honors from such people", Vostrikov toasts the survivors and those who sacrificed their lives.

== Cast ==
- Harrison Ford as Captain 2nd Rank Alexei Vostrikov, Commanding Officer
- Liam Neeson as Captain 3rd Rank Mikhail "Misha" Polenin, Executive Officer
- Peter Sarsgaard as Lieutenant Vadim Radtchenko, Reactor Officer
- Joss Ackland as Marshal Zolentsov, Defence Minister
- John Shrapnel as Admiral Bratyeev
- Donald Sumpter as Captain 3rd Rank Gennadi Savran, Medical Officer
- Tim Woodward as Vice-Admiral Konstantin Partonov
- Steve Nicolson as Captain 3rd Rank Yuri Demichev, Torpedo Officer
- Ravil Isyanov as Captain 3rd Rank Igor Suslov, Political Officer
- Christian Camargo as Petty Officer Pavel Loktev, Senior Reactor Technician
- George Anton as Captain-Lieutenant Konstantin Poliansky, Missile Officer
- James Francis Ginty as Seaman Anatoly Subachev, Reactor Technician
- Lex Shrapnel as Captain-Lieutenant Mikhail Kornilov, Communications Officer
- Ingvar Eggert Sigurðsson as Captain 3rd Rank Viktor Gorelov, Chief Engineer
- Sam Spruell as Senior Seaman Dmitri Nevsky
- Sam Redford as Petty Officer 2nd Class Vasily Mishin
- Peter Stebbings as Kuryshev
- Shaun Benson as Chief Petty Officer Leonid Pashinski
- Kristen Holden-Ried as Captain-Lieutenant Anton Malahov
- Dmitry Chepovetsky as Sergei Maximov
- Tygh Runyan as Petty Officer 1st Class Maxim Portenko, Sonar Operator
- Jacob Pitts as Grigori
- Michael Gladis as Senior Seaman Yevgeny Borzenkov
- JJ Feild as Andrei Pritoola
- Peter Oldring as Vanya Belov
- Joshua Close as Viktor
- Jeremy Akerman as Fyodor Tsetkov, Captain of the S-270

== Production ==
K-19: The Widowmaker cost between $90 to $100 million to produce, but gross returns were only $35 million in the United States and $30.5 million internationally. The film was not financed by a major studio (National Geographic Films was a wholly owned taxable subsidiary of the National Geographic Society), making it one of the most expensive independent films to-date. The film was shot in Halifax, Nova Scotia; Toronto, Ontario; Gimli, Manitoba; and Moscow, Russia.

The K-19 was portrayed in the film by K-77, a Soviet submarine launched in the 1960s. Following the production of the movie, the K-77 was opened as a museum ship in Providence, Rhode Island until it sank in a storm in 2007.

The producers made some efforts to work with the original crew of K-19, who took exception to the first version of the script available to them, and called for an end to Russian cooperation with the filmmakers. The nickname "The Widowmaker" was used only in the film. In real life, the submarine had no nickname until the nuclear accident on July 3, 1961, when it received the nickname "Hiroshima".

== Reception ==
On the review aggregator website Rotten Tomatoes, 60% of 170 critics' reviews are positive, with an average rating of 6.2/10. The website's critics consensus reads: "A gripping drama even though the filmmakers have taken liberties with the facts." Metacritic calculated a weighted average score of 58 out of 100 based on 35 critics, indicating "mixed or average" reviews. Audiences polled by CinemaScore gave the film an average grade of "B" on an A+ to F scale.

When K-19: The Widowmaker was premiered in Russia in October 2002, 52 veterans of the K-19 submarine accepted flights to the Saint Petersburg premiere; despite what they saw as technical as well as historical compromises, they praised the film and, in particular, the performance of Harrison Ford.

In his review, film critic Roger Ebert compared K-19: The Widowmaker to other classic films of the genre, "Movies involving submarines have the logic of chess: The longer the game goes, the fewer the possible remaining moves. K-19: The Widowmaker joins a tradition that includes Das Boot and The Hunt for Red October and goes back to Run Silent, Run Deep."

In a 2023 interview with James Hibberd of The Hollywood Reporter, Ford cited his role as Alexei Vostrikov as one of the roles he is most proud of playing, and considered the movie to be good in spite of its lukewarm critical reception.
