= Hotel-class submarine =

Soviet Navy nuclear-powered ballistic missile submarine (1960–1991)

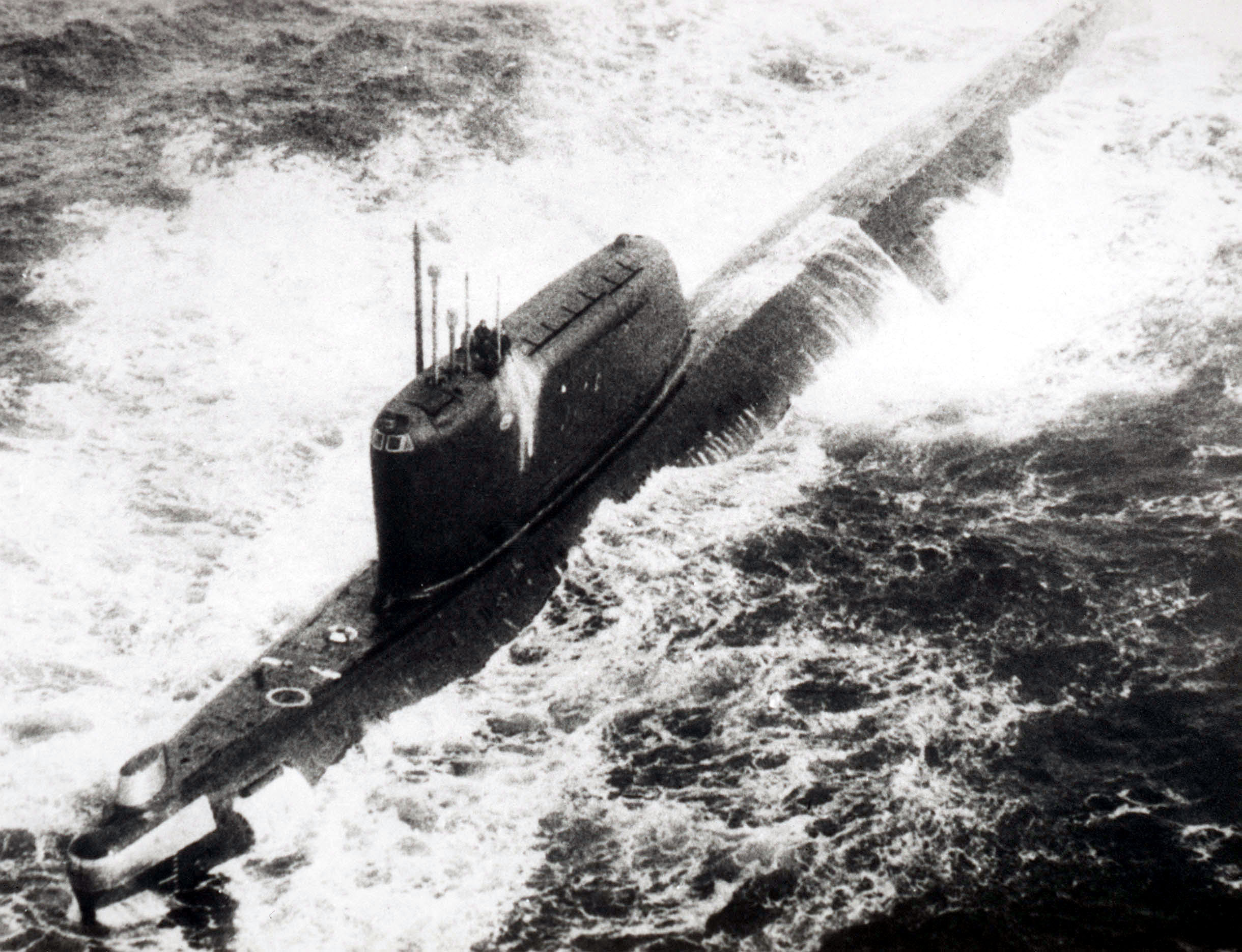
- Project 658M submarine

Class overview
- Name: 658
- Builders: Severodvinsk
- Operators: Soviet Navy
- Preceded by: 629
- Succeeded by: Navaga / Nalim
- In commission: 1960–1991
- Completed: 8
- Retired: 8

General characteristics
- Type: Nuclear submarine
- Displacement: 658M : 5,500 long tons (5,588 t) submerged
- Length: 114 m (374 ft 0 in)
- Beam: 9.2 m (30 ft 2 in)
- Draught: 7.31 m (24 ft 0 in)
- Propulsion: 2 × pressurized water reactors, 2 shafts
- Speed: 18 knots (21 mph; 33 km/h) surfaced; 26 knots (30 mph; 48 km/h) submerged
- Complement: 104
- Armament: 658 : D-2 missile system; 3 × R-13 (SS-N-4 Sark) missiles; 658M : D-4 missile system; 3 × R-21 (SS-N-5 Serb) missiles; 4 × 21 in (533 mm) torpedo tubes forward; 2 × 16 in (406 mm) tubes forward; 2 × 16 in (406 mm) tubes aft

The Soviet Navy's Project 658 (NATO reporting name: Hotel) is a type of nuclear-powered ballistic missile submarine that was launched by the Soviet Union around 1959.

== Design ==
The development of the submarine, designed to carry the D-2 launch system and R-13 missiles, was approved on 26 August 1956. Work on the design began in September 1956, the technical project was completed in the first quarter of 1957.

The duties of the chief designer of Project 658 were originally assigned to the chief engineer of OKB-18, P.Z. Golosovskiy. In February 1958 project management was transferred to I.V. Mikhaylov, who in October 1958 had replaced S.N. Kovalev. From the outset the deputy of the chief designer was I.D. Spasskiy.

The Hotel design was based on the Project 627 November-class submarine, the first Soviet nuclear submarines. They were modified by adding the missile compartment from the Golf-class submarines. Additionally, the Hotels had small horizontal hydroplanes for better maneuverability and more reliable electro-hydraulic command control surfaces for high-speed underwater operations with reduced noise.

The D-2 launch system on the Hotels placed three R-13 missiles in vertical containers directly behind the sail. The submarine had to be surfaced to launch, but all three missiles could be fired within 12 minutes of surfacing.

== Variants ==
- Project 658: The first Hotel-class submarine, K-19, was laid down on 17 October 1958 and commissioned on 12 November 1960, only to suffer numerous setbacks and accidents. The last of the eight Hotel submarines was launched on April 1, 1962. All of them were built at Severodvinsk State Shipyard 402 (now known as the Northern Machine-Building Enterprise - SEVMASH) in Molotovsk (now Severodvinsk) shipyard Russia.
- Project 658M: Beginning in 1961 and ending in 1963, all Hotels but one (K-145) were equipped with the new D-4 launch system, which could launch missiles from a depth of 16 m (52 ft). The modified submarines received the NATO reporting name Hotel II. They were armed with R-21 (SS-N-5 Serb) missiles, with a range of 1,200 km (650 nmi). The installation of the D-4 launching system required some structural changes of the submarine; before launch, the launch tube had to be flooded. The chief designer of the modification was S.N. Kovalev.
- Project 701: From 1969 to 1970, K-145 was modified by Project 701 to test the R-29 missiles, receiving the NATO reporting name Hotel III. It was lengthened to 130 meters and its displacement increased to 5,500 tons surfaced and 6,400 tons submerged. The maximum speed was reduced to 18 kn (33 km/h; 21 mph) on the surface and 22 kn (41 km/h; 25 mph) submerged. Six launchers for R-29 missiles were placed in two compartments, each with three launchers. In 1976 K-145 returned to combat service.

== Vessels ==
Hotel-class — significant dates
#	Shipyard	Laid down	Launched	Commissioned	Status
K-19	SEVMASH, Severodvinsk	17 October 1958	11 October 1959	12 November 1960	Decommissioned in 1991 as KS-19 for scrap
K-33/K-54	SEVMASH, Severodvinsk	9 February 1959	6 August 1960	24 December 1960	Decommissioned in 1987 for scrap
K-55	SEVMASH, Severodvinsk	5 August 1959	18 September 1960	27 December 1960	Decommissioned in 1989 for scrap
K-40	SEVMASH, Severodvinsk	6 December 1959	18 June 1961	27 December 1961	Decommissioned in 1987 for scrap
K-16	SEVMASH, Severodvinsk	5 May 1960	31 July 1961	28 December 1961	Decommissioned in 1987 for scrap
K-145	SEVMASH, Severodvinsk	21 January 1961	30 May 1962	31 October 1962	Decommissioned in 1989 for scrap
K-149	SEVMASH, Severodvinsk	12 April 1961	20 July 1962	27 October 1962	Decommissioned in 1991 for scrap
K-178	SEVMASH, Severodvinsk	11 September 1961	1 April 1962	8 December 1962	Decommissioned in 1990 for scrap

== Bibliography ==
- Pavlov, A. S. (1997). Warships of the USSR and Russia 1945–1995. Naval Institute Press. ISBN 1-55750-671-X.
- Polmar, Norman (2026). Submarines of the Russian and Soviet Navies: 1946–2026. Schiffer Publishing. ISBN 978-0-7643-7083-0.
- Polmar, Norman & Noot, Jurrien (1991). Submarines of the Russian and Soviet Navies, 1718–1990. Naval Institute Press. ISBN 0-87021-570-1.
