= Rizhskaya railway station (Leningradskaya line) =

Railway station in Moscow, Russia

Rizhskaya Рижская
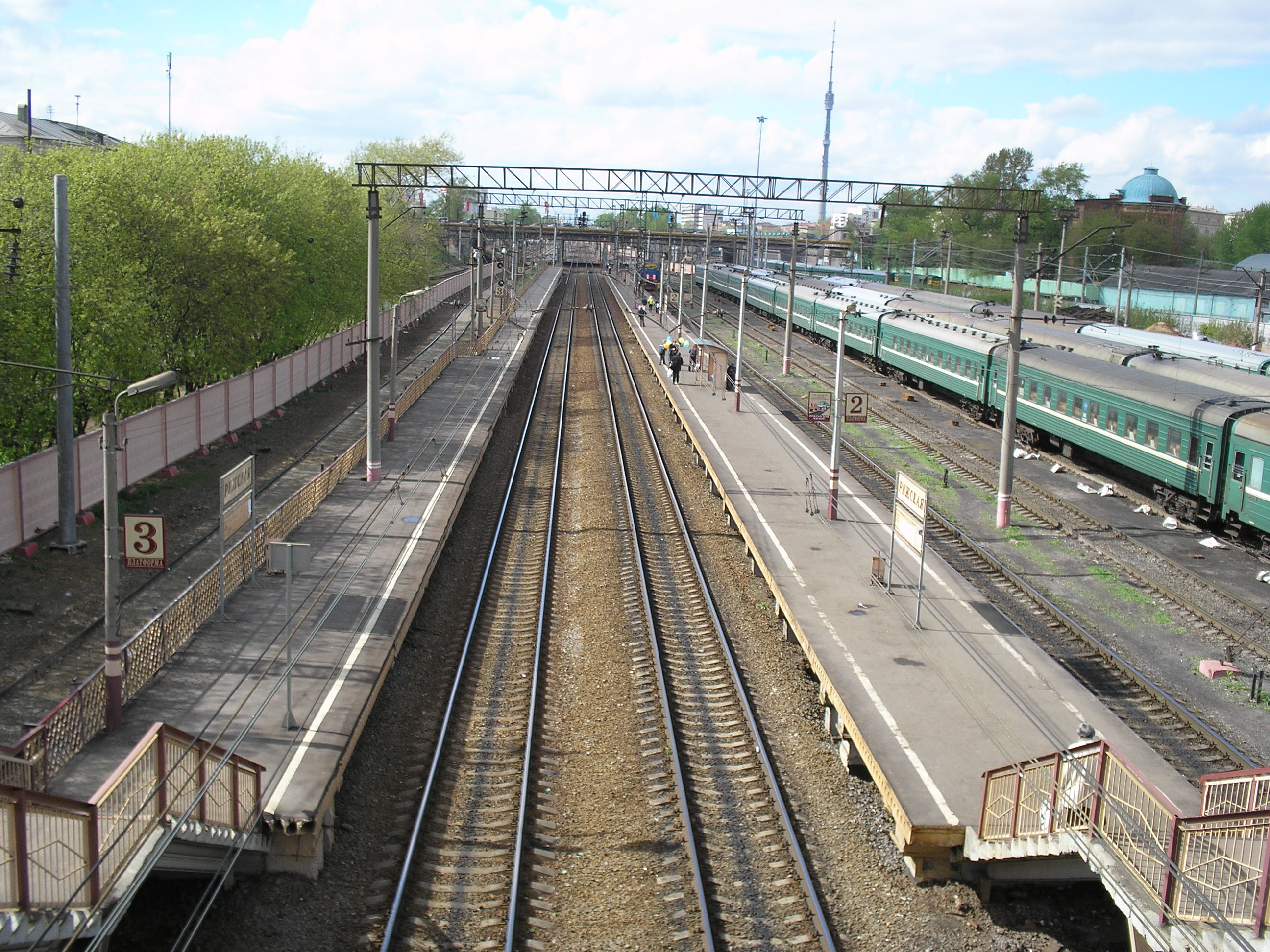
- Rizhskaya railway station in 2007

General information
- Location: Moscow; Russia
- Coordinates: 55°47′49″N 37°38′21″E
- System: Oktyabrskaya Railway platform
- Owner: Russian Railways
- Operator: Oktyabrskaya Railway
- Connections: Rizhskaya; Rizhskaya; Rizhskaya; Rizhskaya

Services
Preceding station	Russian Railways	Following station
Kalibrovskaya towards Tver	Leningradsky Suburban	Moscow Leningradsky Terminus
Future services
Preceding station	Moscow Central Diameters	Following station
Kalibrovskaya towards Kryukovo	Line D3	Nikolayevka towards Ippodrom
Location

Rizhskaya is a railway station on the Leningradskaya line of Oktyabrskaya Railway and prospective Line D3 of the Moscow Central Diameters in Moscow. According to the current plans, the station will be rebuilt.

== Gallery ==
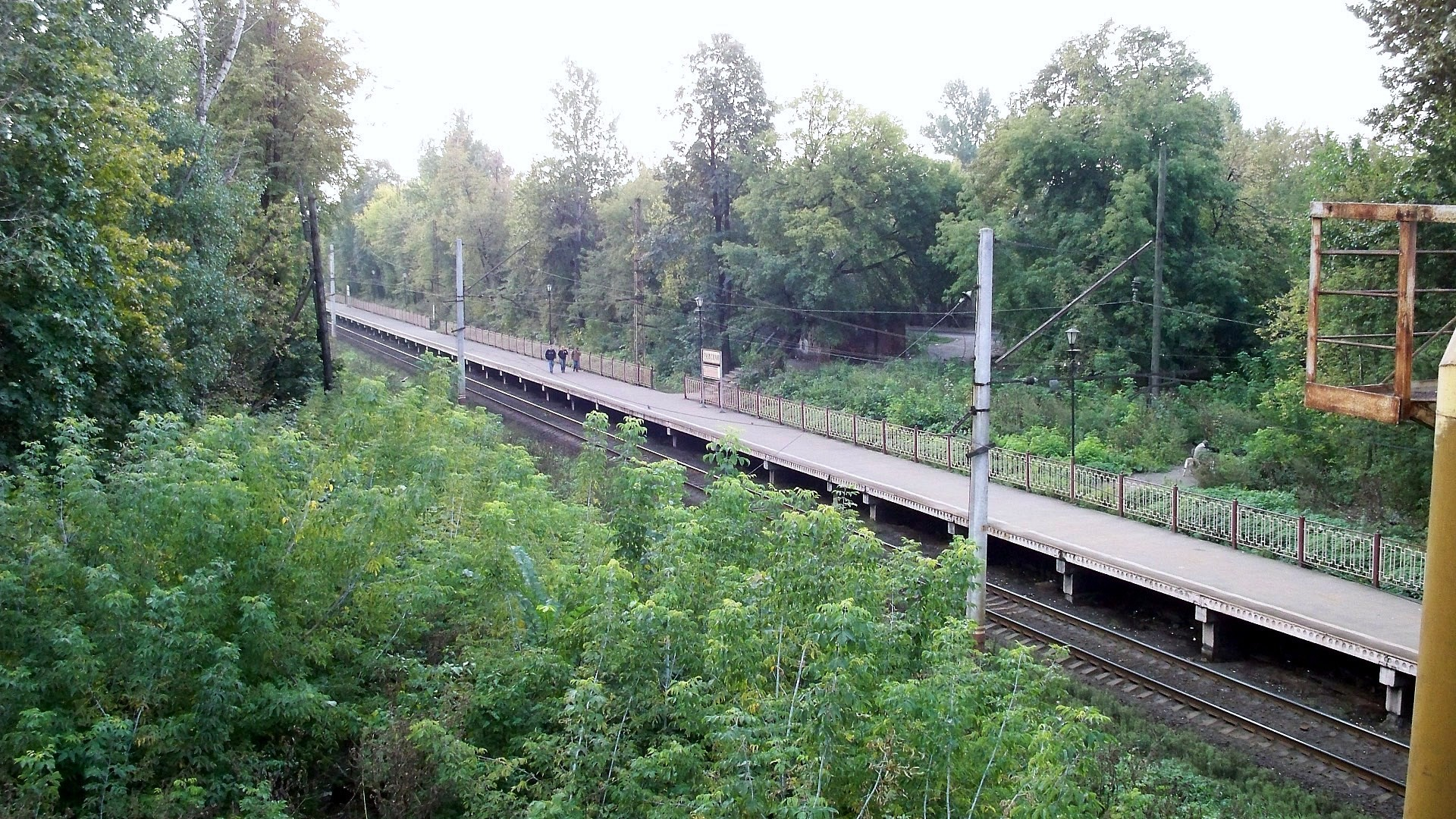
Rizhskaya railway station in 2008

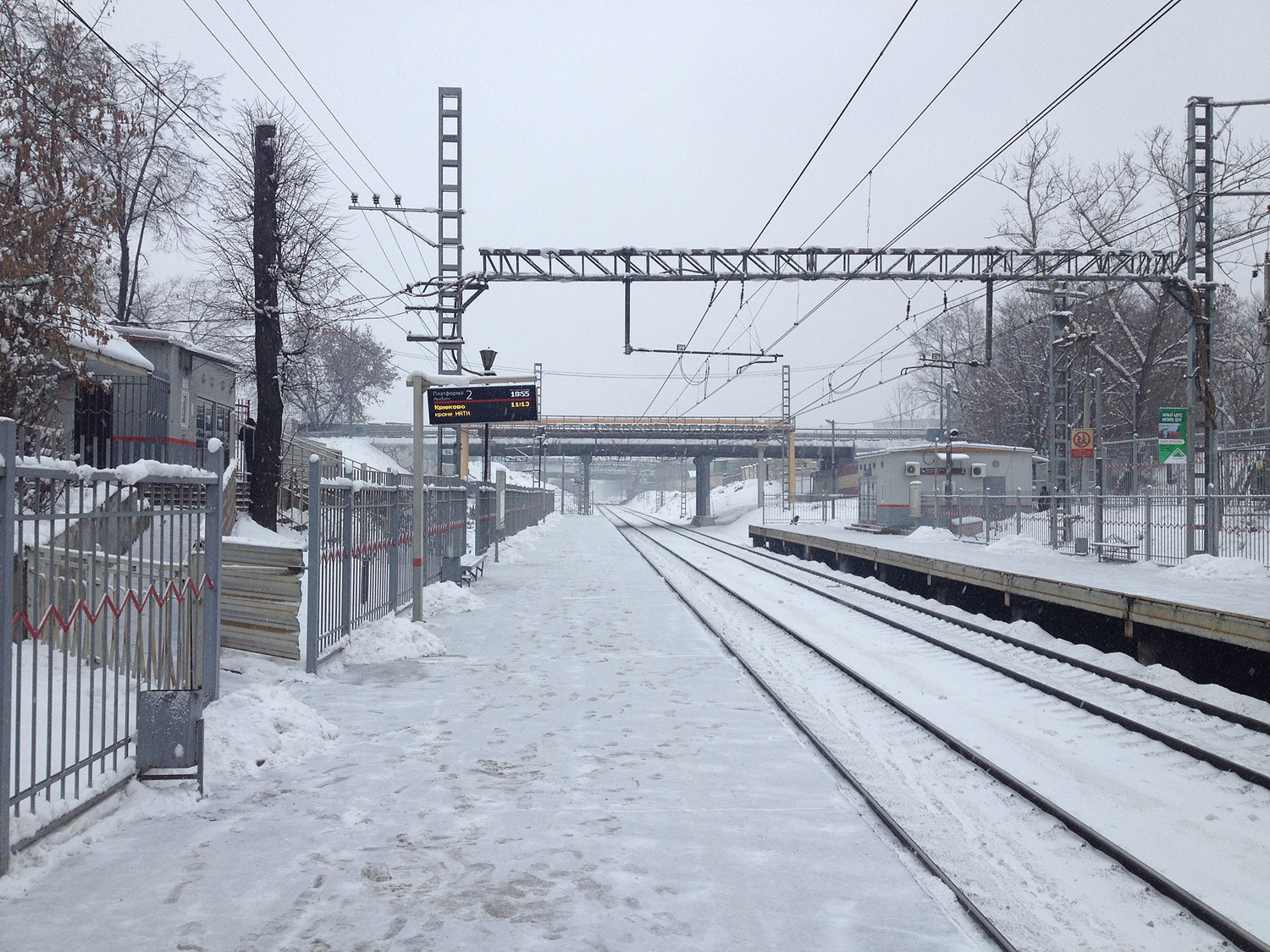
The station in 2014
