= Khovrino railway station =

Railway station in Moscow

Khovrino Ховрино
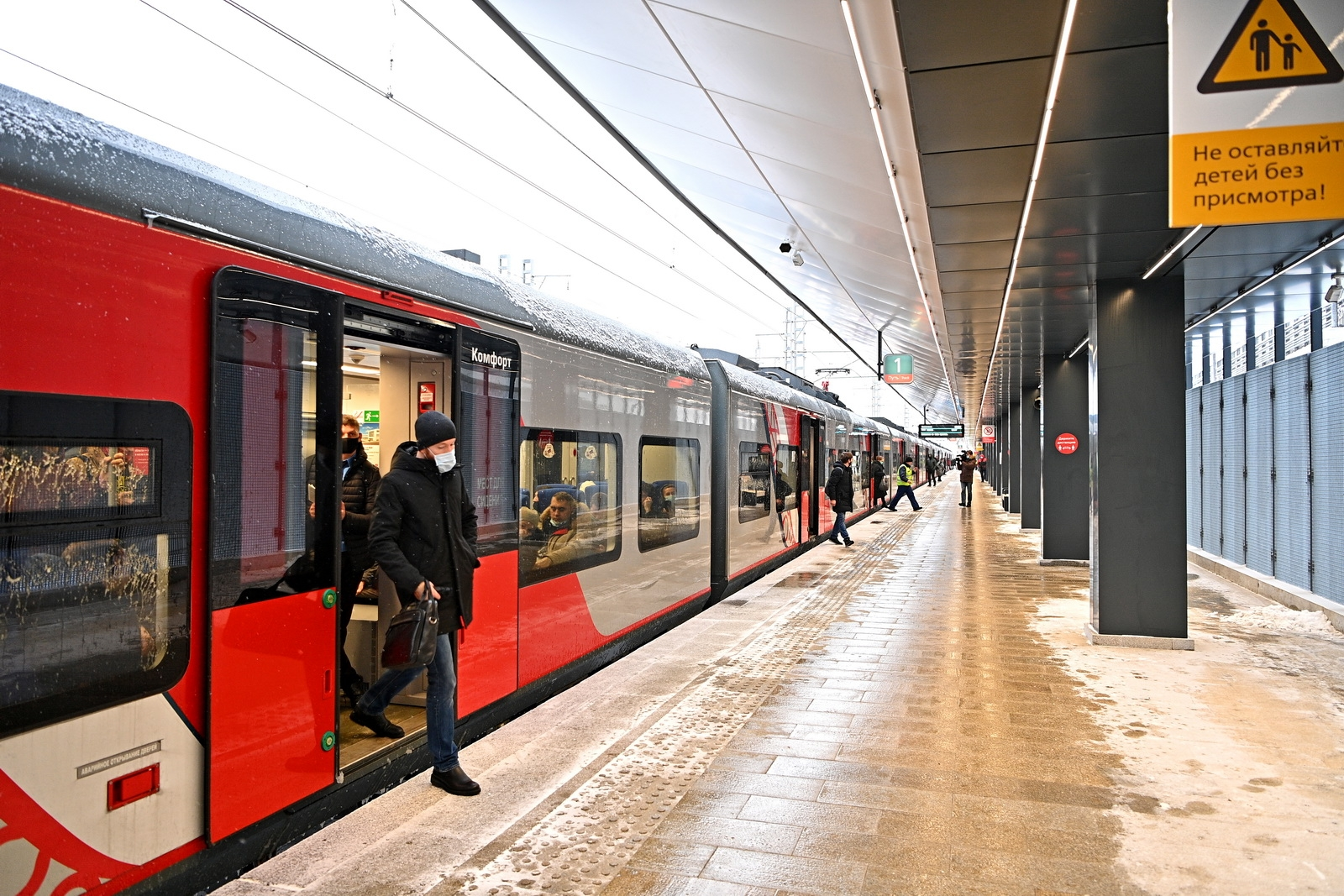

General information
- Location: Russia
- System: Moscow Railway platform
- Owner: Russian Railways
- Operator: Moscow Railway

History
- Opened: 2020

Services
| Preceding station | Russian Railways | Following station |
|---|---|---|
| Levoberezhnaya towards Tver | Leningradsky Suburban | Grachyovskaya towards Moscow Leningradsky |
Proposed
| Preceding station | Moscow Central Diameters | Following station |
| Levoberezhnaya towards Kryukovo | Line D3 | Grachyovskaya towards Ippodrom |
Location

Khovrino is a railway station of Moscow Railway in Moscow. It was opened in November 2020.

== Gallery ==
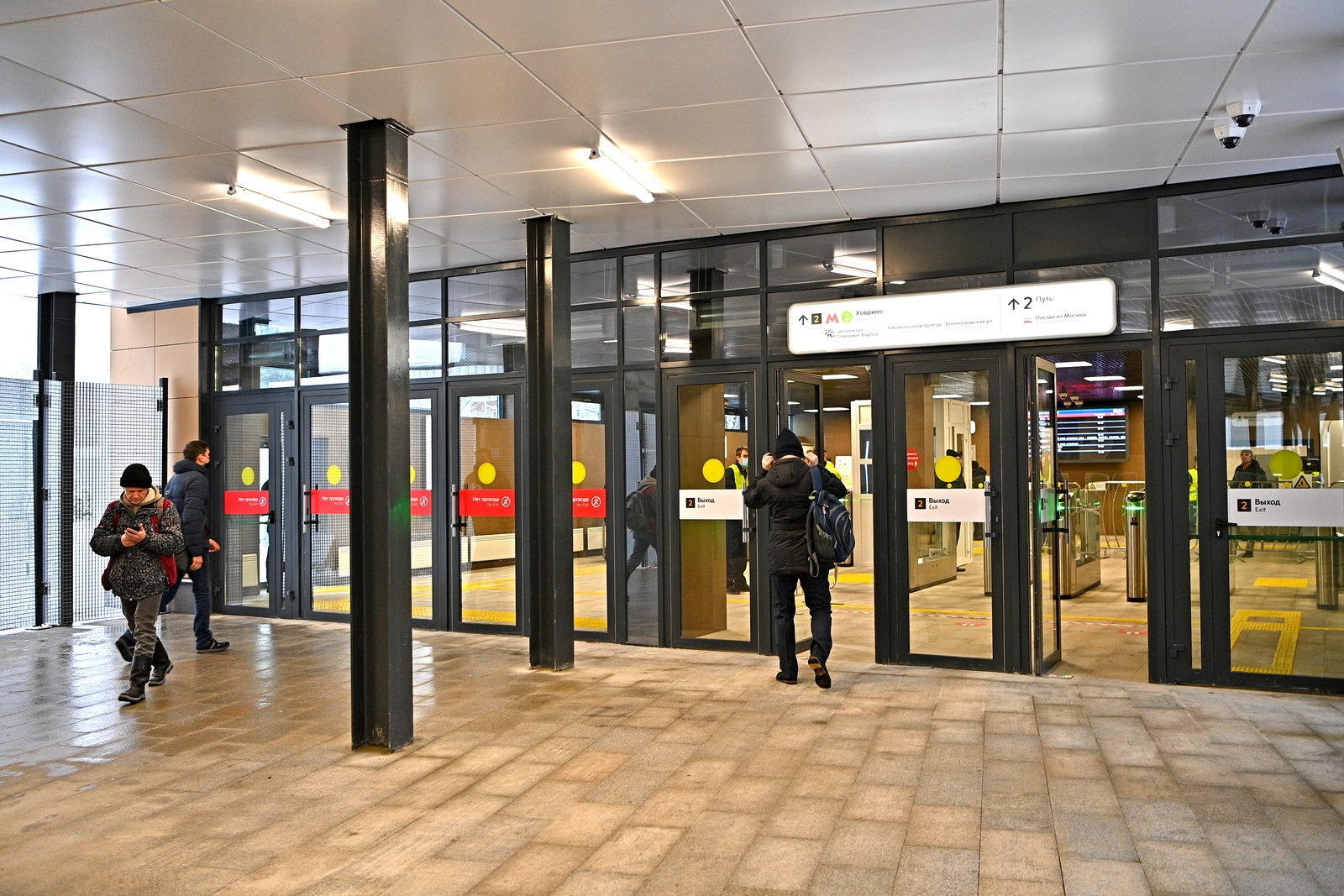

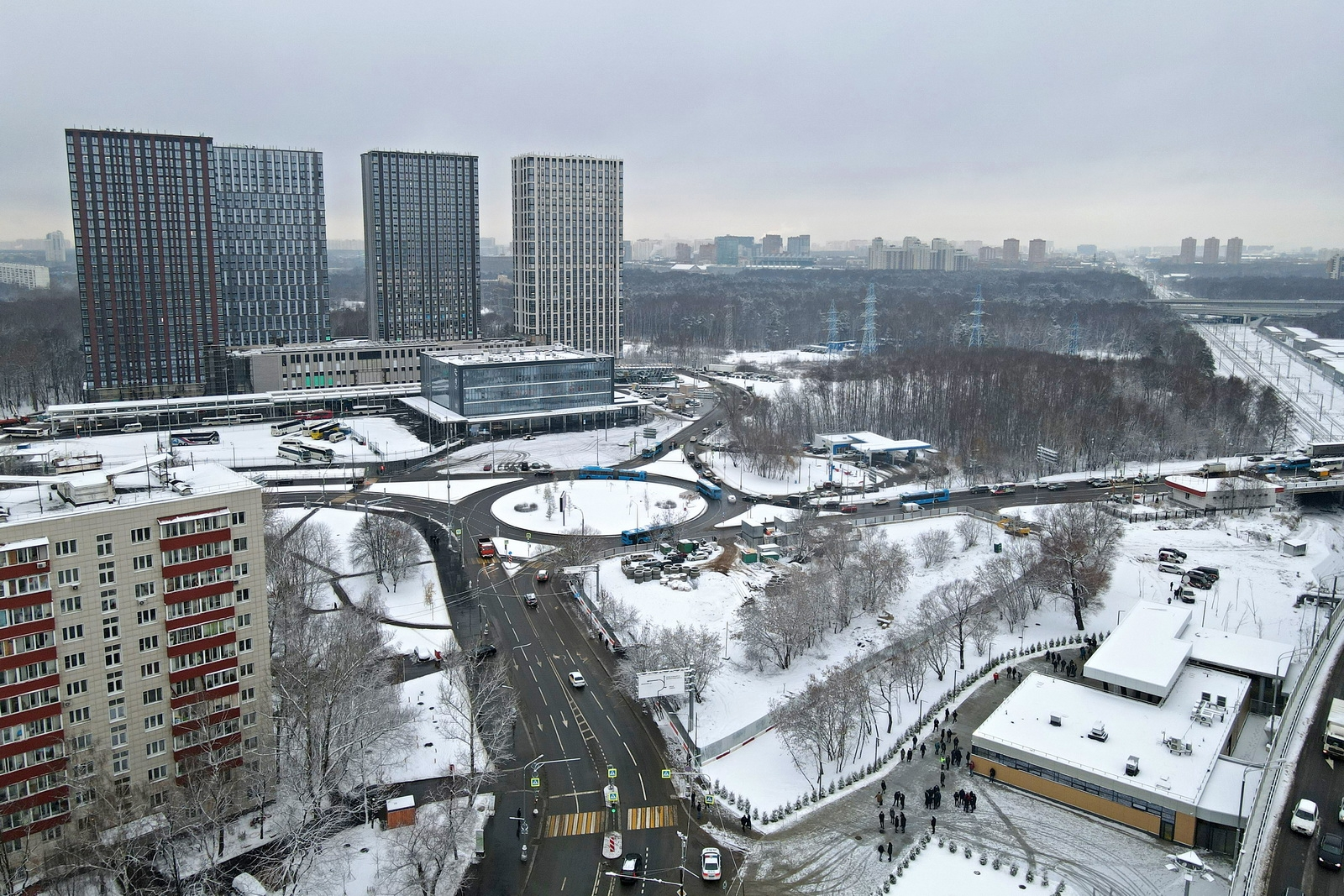
