= Molzhaninovo railway station =

Railway station in Moscow, Russia

Coordinates: 55.9243°N 37.3812°E

Molzhaninovo Молжаниново
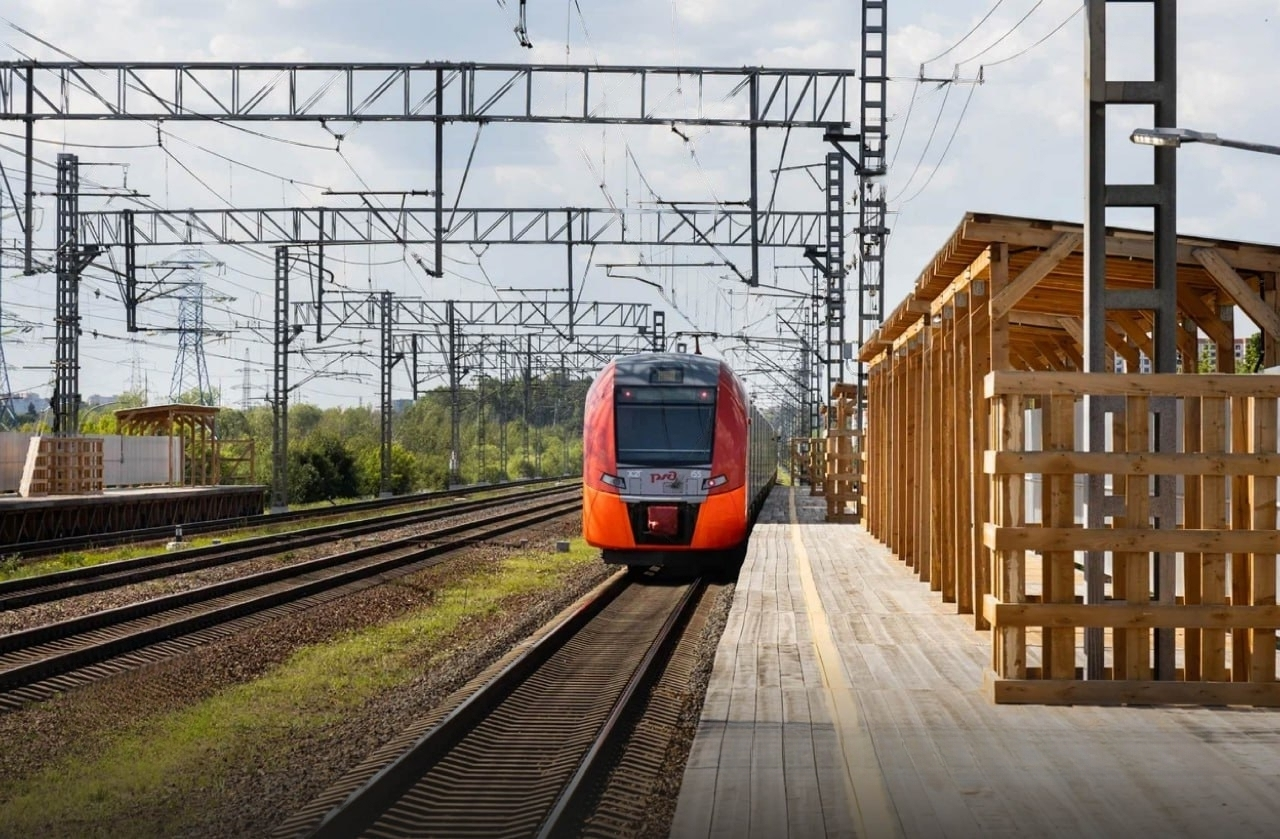

General information
- Location: Khimki, Moscow; Russia
- System: Platform
- Owner: Russian Railways
- Operator: October Railway
- Line: Saint Petersburg–Moscow railway
- Platforms: 2
- Tracks: 4

Construction
- Structure type: At-grade
- Parking: Yes

Other information
- Station code: 060317

History
- Opened: 1932
- Former names: Planernaya

Services
Preceding station	Russian Railways	Following station
Novopodrezkovo towards Tver	Leningradsky Suburban	Khimki towards Moscow Leningradsky
Proposed
Preceding station	Moscow Central Diameters	Following station
Novopodrezkovo towards Kryukovo	Line D3	Novye Khimki towards Ippodrom
Location

Molzhaninovo, formerly Planernaya, is a railway station located on the north side of Khimki on the Moscow-St Petersburg Railway. It serves the Leningradsky suburban railway line.

== History ==
The platforms were opened in the late 1920s. It was originally called Pervomayskaya, but in 1932 it was renamed for the Osoaviakhim gliding school located nearby. Later, the school was replaced by the equestrian school of the "Spartak" sports organization, which eventually became the "Planernaya" Olympic training and sports center. Since the end of 2012, the northbound platform has been partly dismantled in connection with the laying of a new second track, and replaced by a wooden platform that provides egress from the four head cars of electric trains. Germany reached this briefly in late 1941.

== About the station ==
It has two main landing platforms on the 1st and 2nd tracks. On the 3rd (middle) track in the 1990s, during the repair of the line section after a landslide, an additional short landing platform for one car was built. A pedestrian tunnel from the southern end of the station allows customers to transfer between platforms.

Exits to Luzhskaya Street and the Leningrad Highway (about 100 meters) and Starofilinskaya Street (about 300 meters to Filino Village, now part of Moscow, and the Spartak settlement of Khimki City District, Moscow Region). Within walking distance is the Olympic training and sports center "Planernaya", Khimki cemetery, and a unit of the Institute of Medical and Biological Problems of the Russian Academy of Sciences.
