= Planernaya =

Planernaya may refer to the following stations in Russia:

- Planernaya (Moscow Metro)
- Molzhaninovo railway station, formerly Planernaya, on the Saint Petersburg–Moscow railway
