= Ploschad Tryokh Vokzalov railway station =

Railway station in Moscow, Russia

Ploschad Tryokh Vokzalov Площадь Трёх Вокзалов
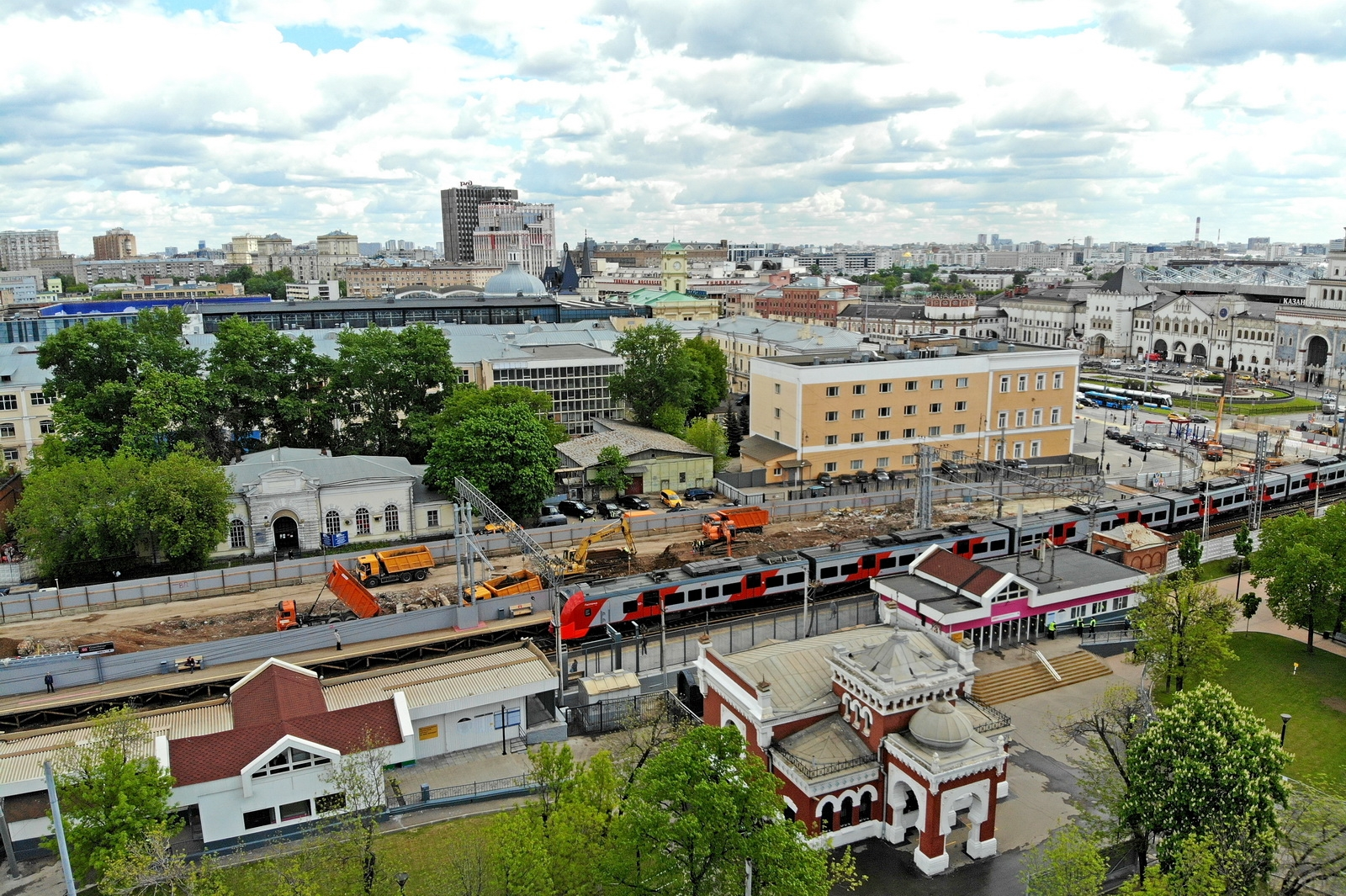

General information
- Location: Kalanchyovskaya street, Moscow; Russia
- Coordinates: 55°46′35″N 37°39′05″E
- System: Moscow Railway station
- Owner: Russian Railways
- Operator: Moscow Railway
- Platforms: 2
- Tracks: 4
- Connections: Sokolnicheskaya line; Koltsevaya line

Construction
- Structure type: At-grade
- Parking: Yes
- Cycle facilities: Yes
- Accessible: Yes

Other information
- Station code: 191617

History
- Opened: 1865
- Rebuilt: 2023

Services
Preceding station	Moscow Central Diameters	Following station
Rizhskaya towards Nakhabino	Line D2	Kurskaya towards Podolsk
Kurskaya towards Zheleznodorozhnaya	Line D4	Rizhskaya towards Aprelevka
Location

Ploschad Tryokh Vokzalov (Russian: Площадь Трёх Вокзалов, English: Three Stations Square), until 2023 Moskva-Kalanchyovskaya (Russian: Москва-Каланчёвская) is a square along Line D2 of the Moscow Central Diameters in Moscow. Construction was finished in 2023.

== Gallery ==
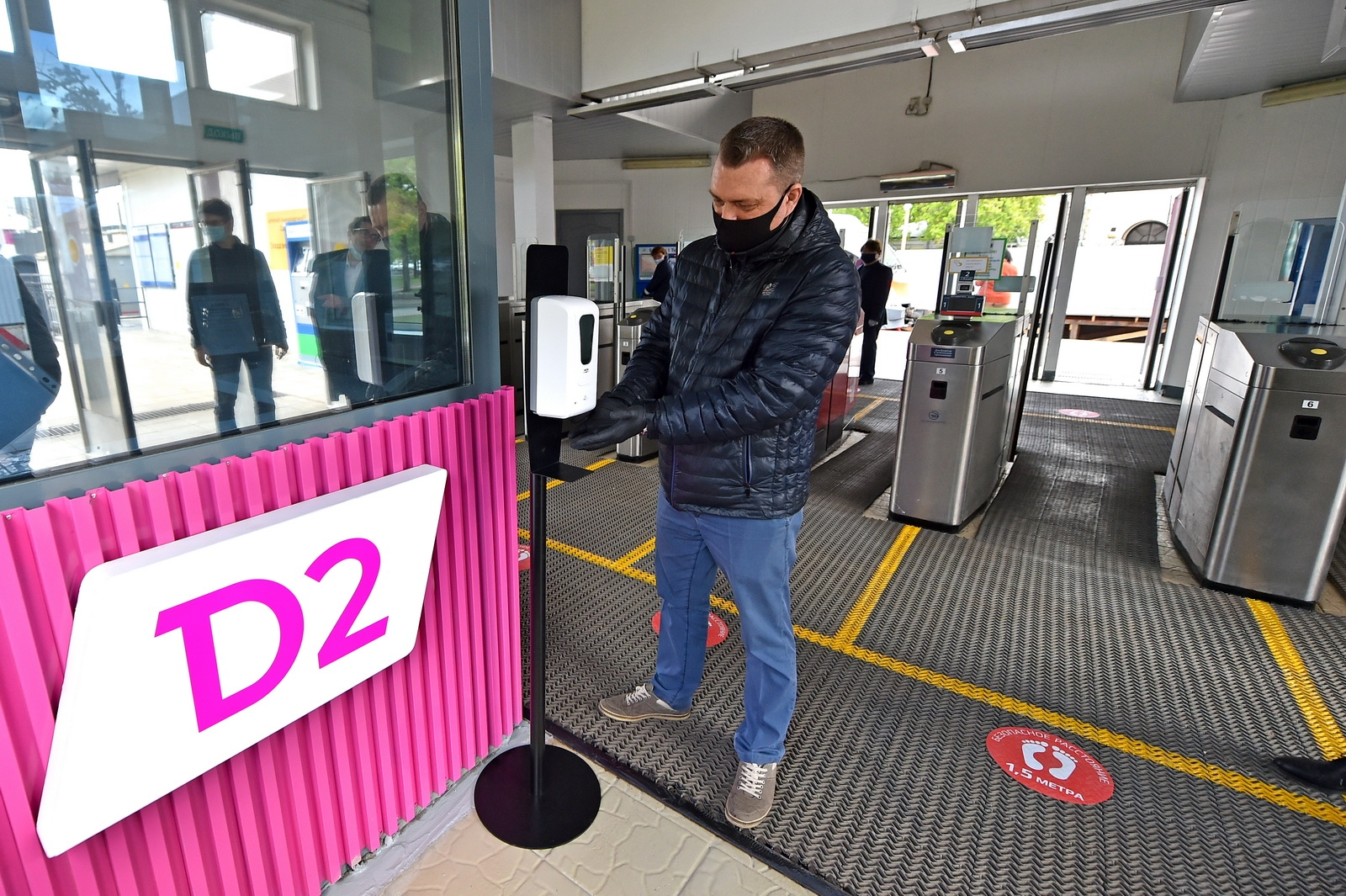

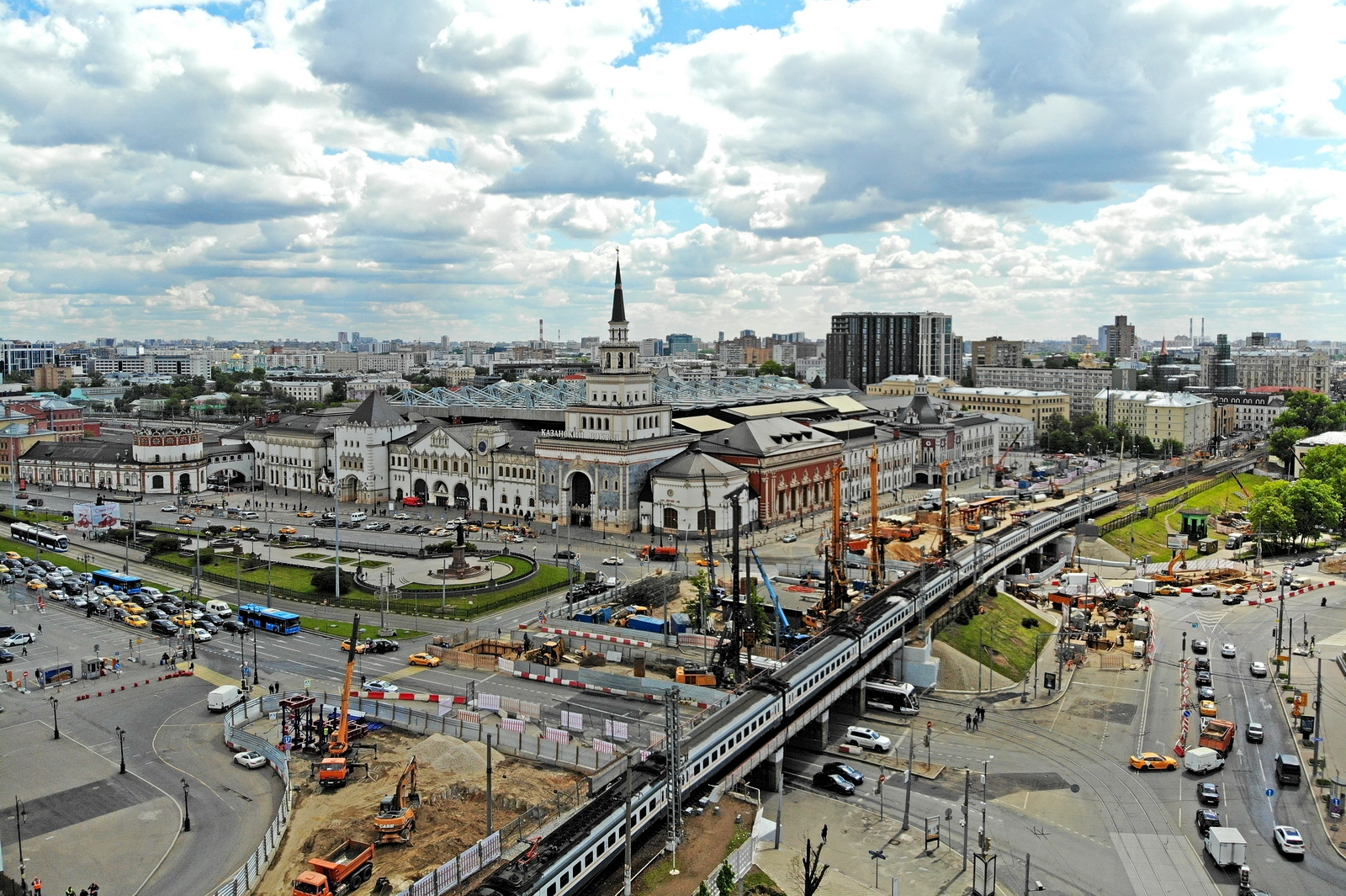

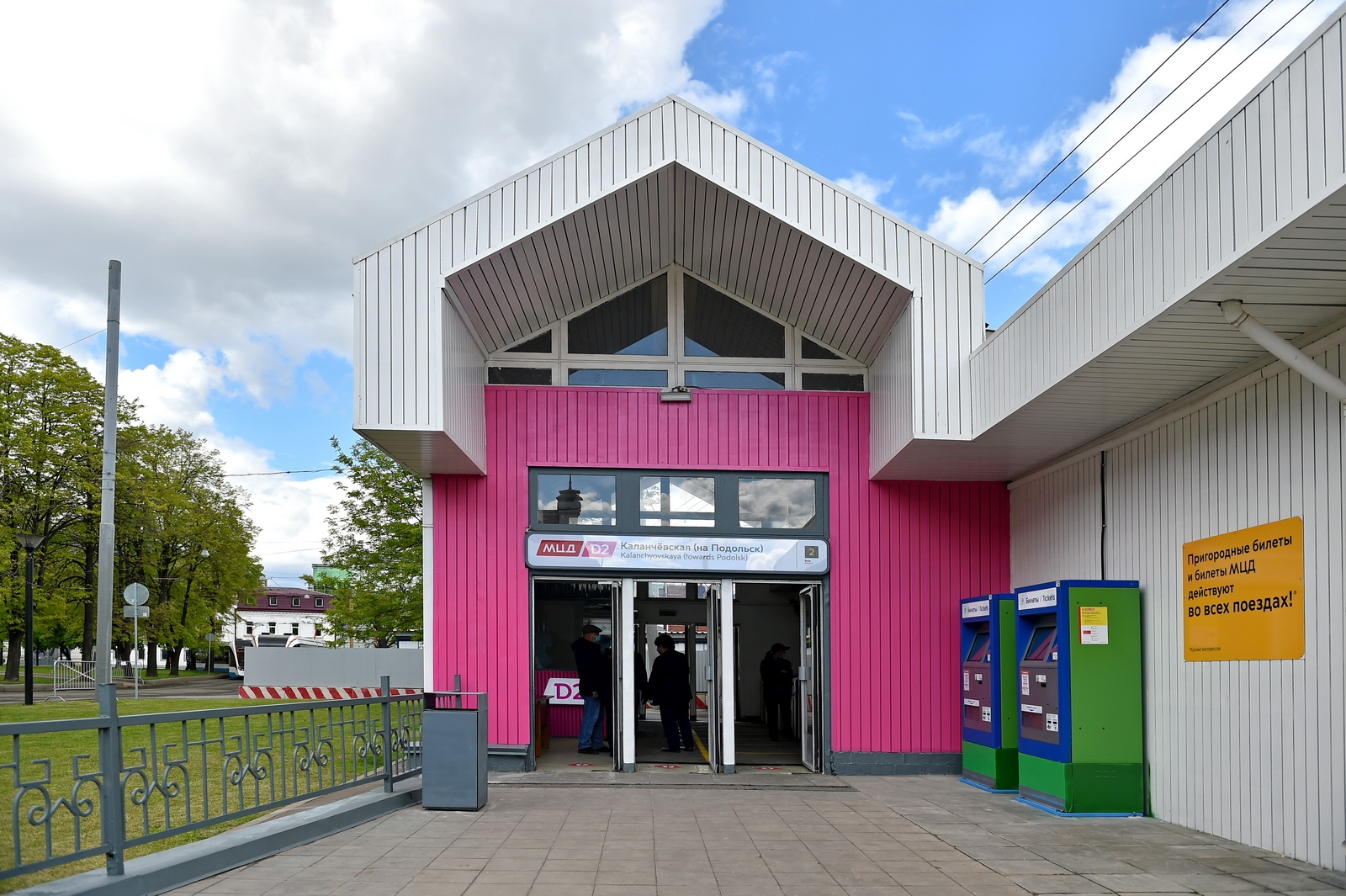
