= Rizhskaya railway station (Alekseyevskaya connecting branch line) =

Railway station of Alexeyevsky rail branch in Moscow

Rizhskaya Рижская
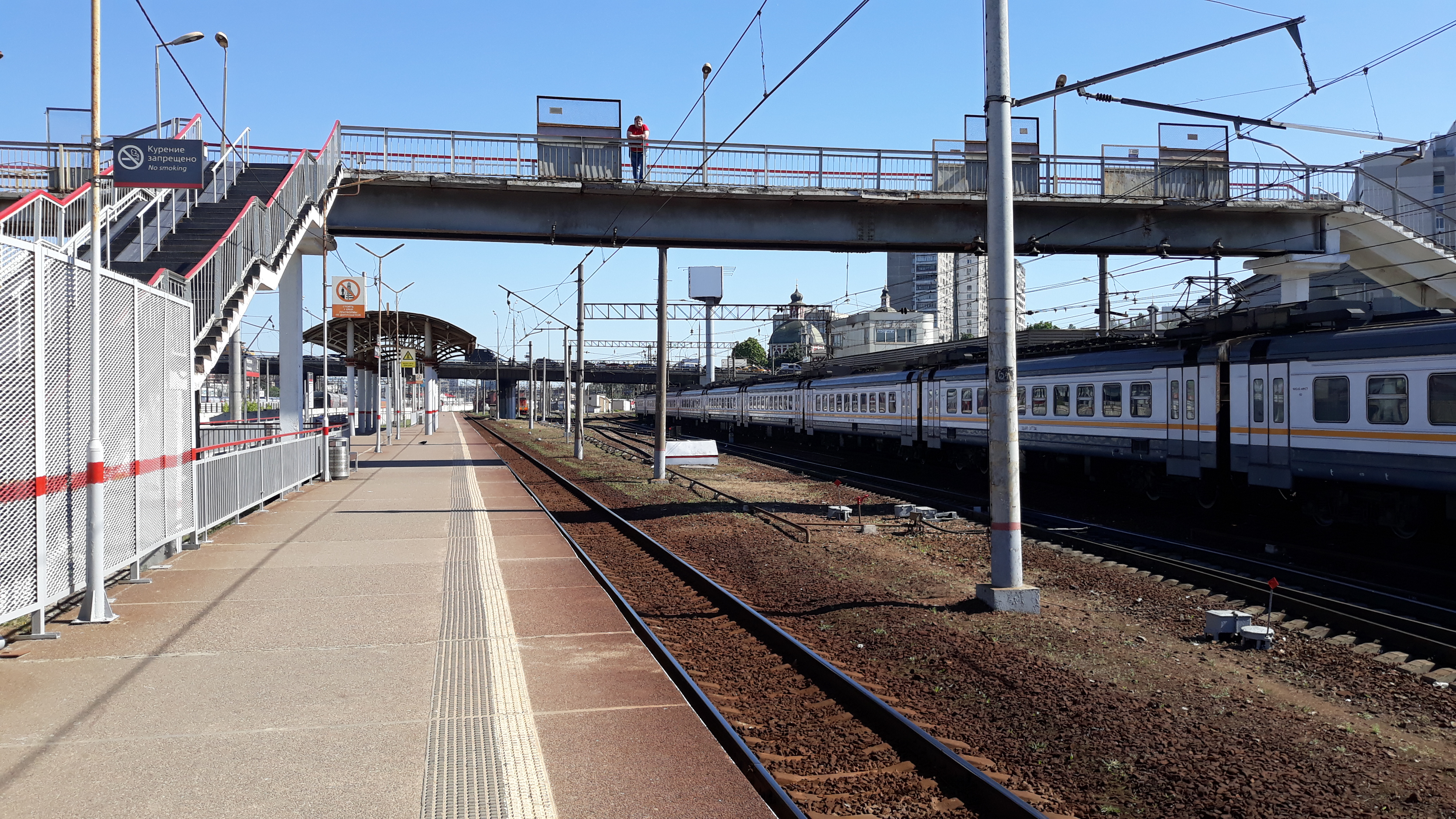

General information
- Location: Rizhskaya, Moscow; Russia
- Coordinates: 55.7938°N 37.6388°E
- System: Moscow Railway platform
- Owner: Russian Railways
- Operator: Moscow Railway
- Platforms: 2 (Side platform)
- Tracks: 2
- Connections: Rizhskaya; Rizhskaya; Rizhskaya

Construction
- Structure type: At-grade

History
- Opened: 1949
- Former names: Rzhevskaya

Services
| Preceding station | Moscow Central Diameters | Following station |
|---|---|---|
| Maryina Roscha towards Nakhabino | Line D2 | Kalanchyovskaya towards Podolsk |
Proposed
| Kalanchyovskaya towards Zheleznodorozhnaya | Line D4 | Maryina Roshcha towards Aprelevka |
Location

Rizhskaya is a railway station of Moscow Railway on Alekseyevskaya connecting branch line in Moscow, that serving lines D2 and D4 of the Moscow Central Diameters and the regional trains of Russian Railways. It was opened in 1949.

== Gallery ==
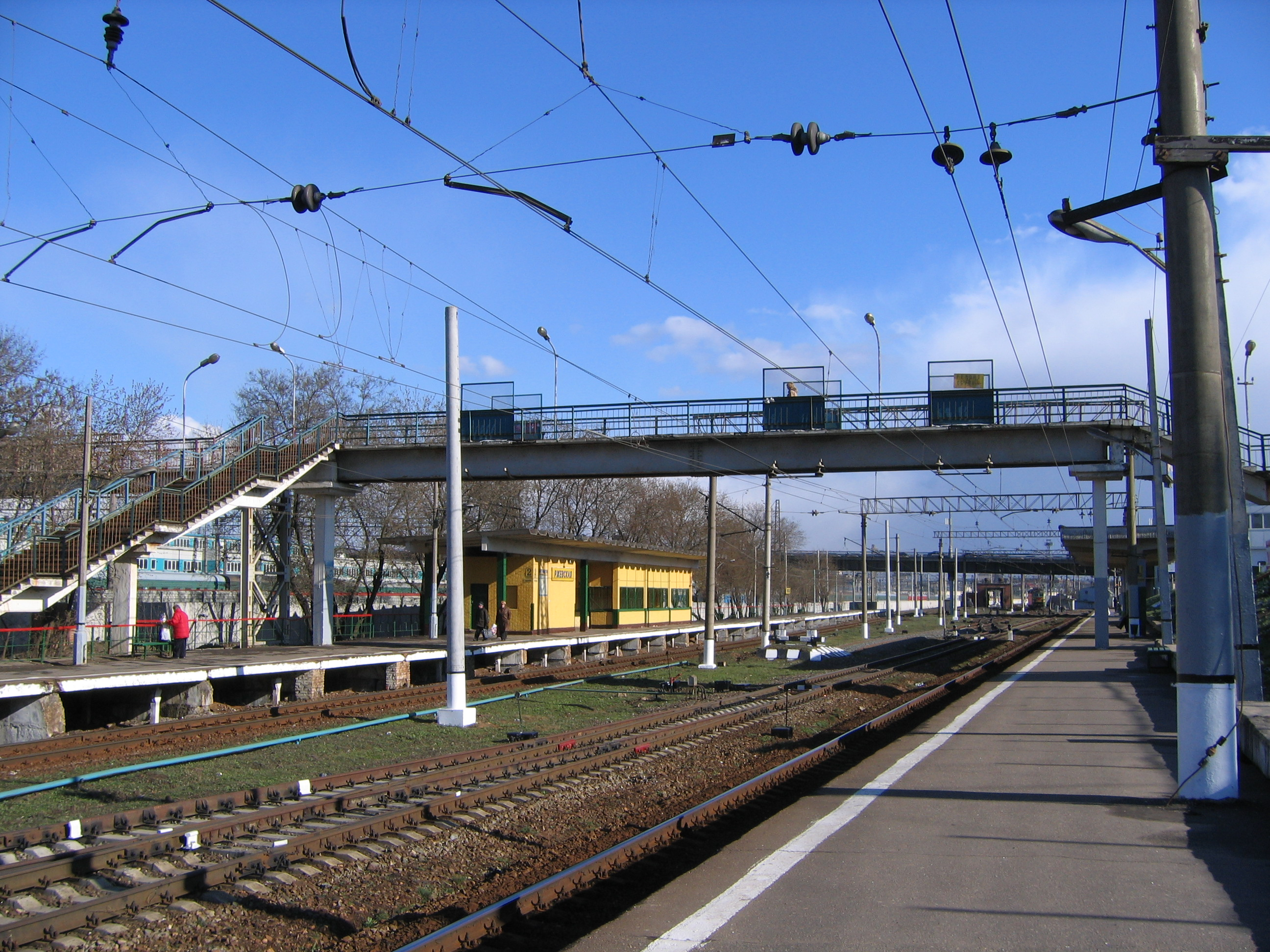
Rzhevskaya railway station in 2007. Later it was renamed to Rizhskaya.

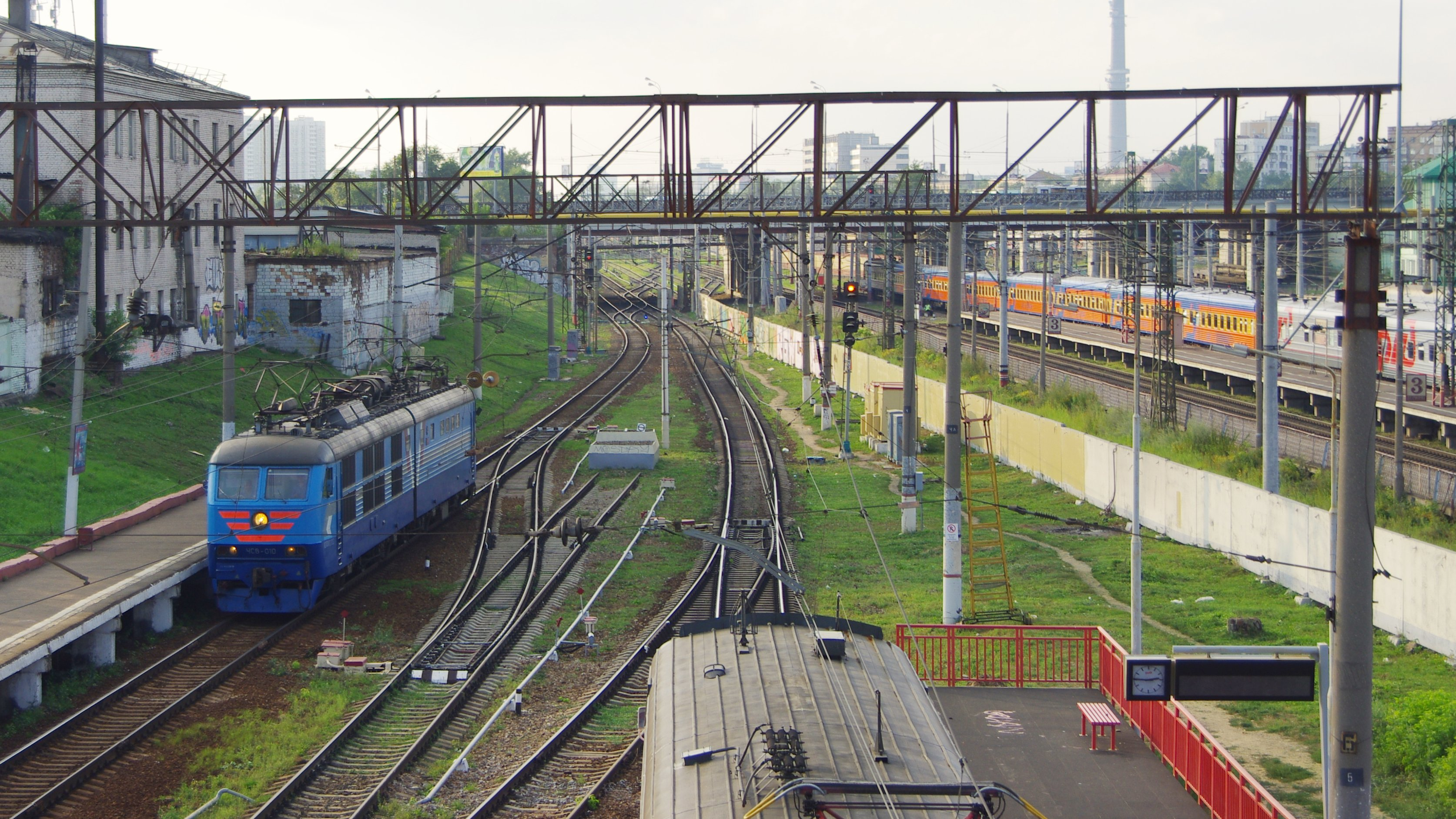
