= Line D3 (Moscow Central Diameters) =

Future suburban rail line in Moscow

Leningradsko-Kazansky Diameter

Overview
- Native name: Ленинградско-Казанский диаметр
- Status: Operating
- Owner: Government of Russia
- Locale: Moscow
- Termini: Zelenograd-Kryukovo; Ippodrom
- Stations: 42

Service
- Type: Commuter rail
- System: Moscow Central Diameters
- Operator: Central Suburban Passenger Company
- Rolling stock: EG2Tv

History
- Opened: 17 August 2023

Technical
- Line length: 88 km (55 mi)
- Track gauge: 1,520 mm (4 ft 11 27/32 in) Russian gauge

D3 (Russian: МЦД-3) or Leningradsko-Kazansky Diameter (Russian: Ленинградско-Казанский диаметр) (Diameter 3; Orange Diameter) is the third line of the Moscow Central Diameters which was opened on 17 August 2023. 14 stations of D-3 will be interchange stations to the Metro and the Moscow Central Circle.

== Stations ==
| Station Name | | Transfers |
| English | Russian | Transfers |
|---|---|---|
| Zelenograd-Kryukovo | Зеленоград-Крюково | |
| Malino | Малино | |
| Firsanovskaya | Фирсановская | |
| Skhodnya | Сходня | |
| Podrezkovo | Подрезково | |
| Novopodrezkovo | Новоподрезково | |
| Molzhaninovo | Молжаниново | |
| Khimki | Химки | |
| Levoberezhnaya | Левобережная | |
| Khovrino | Ховрино | Khovrino |
| Grachyovskaya | Грачёвская | |
| Mosselmash | Моссельмаш | |
| Likhobory | Лихоборы | Likhobory |
| Petrovsko-Razumovskaya | Петровско-Разумовская | Petrovsko-Razumovskaya; Petrovsko-Razumovskaya |
| Ostankino | Останкино | Butyrskaya; Teletsentr |
| Rizhskaya | Рижская | Rizhskaya; Rizhskaya; Rizhskaya |
| Mitkovo | Митьково | Sokolniki; Sokolniki |
| Elektrozavodskaya | Электрозаводская | Elektrozavodskaya; Elektrozavodskaya |
| Sortirovochnaya | Сортировочная | |
| Aviamotornaya | Авиамоторная | Aviamotornaya; Aviamotornaya |
| Andronovka | Андроновка | Andronovka |
| Perovo | Перово | Chukhlinka |
| Plyushchevo | Плющево | |
| Veshnyaki | Вешняки | Ryazansky Prospekt |
| Vykhino | Выхино | Vykhino |
| Kosino | Косино | Lermontovsky Prospekt; Kosino |
| Ukhtomskaya | Ухтомская | |
| Lyubertsy | Люберцы | |
| Panki | Панки | |
| Tomilino | Томилино | |
| Kraskovo | Красково | |
| Malakhovka | Малаховка | |
| Udelnaya | Удельная | |
| Bykovo | Быково | |
| Ilyinskaya | Ильинская | |
| Otdykh | Отдых | |
| Kratovo | Кратово | |
| Yeseninskaya | Есенинская | |
| Fabrichnaya | Фабричная | |
| Ramenskoye | Раменское | |
| Ippodrom | Ипподром | |
