= Leningradsky suburban railway line =

Railway line in Russia

Leningradsky Suburban Railway
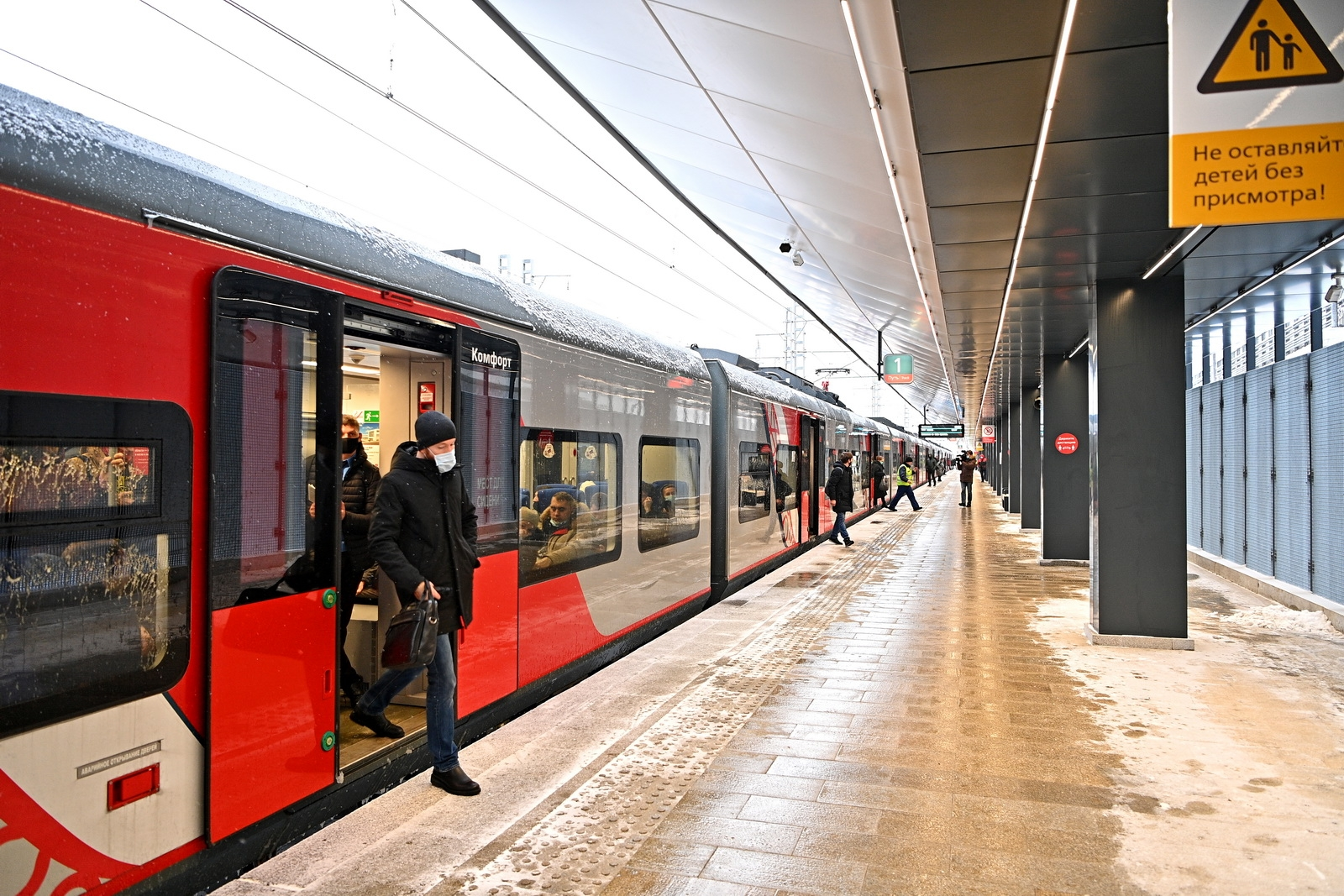
- Leningradsky suburban railway at Khovrino railway station in Moscow.

Overview
- Native name: Ленинградское направление Октябрьской железной дороги
- Owner: Russian Railways
- Locale: Moscow
- Termini: Moscow Leningradsky; Tver
- Stations: 44

Service
- Type: Commuter rail
- System: October Railway
- Operator(s): Russian Railways

History
- Opened: 1 November 1851

Technical
- Track gauge: 1,520 mm (4 ft 11 27/32 in) Russian gauge
- Electrification: 3000 V DC overhead line

The Leningradsky suburban railway line (Russian: Ленинградское направление Октябрьской железной дороги) is one of eleven railway lines used for suburban railway connections between Moscow, Russia, and surrounding areas in Moscow Oblast and Tver Oblast. The Leningradsky suburban railway line connects Moscow with the station in the northwest, in particular, with the towns of Khimki, Zelenograd, Solnechnogorsk, Klin, Konakovo, and Tver. The stations the direction serves are located in Moscow, in the towns of Khimki, Solnechnogorsk, and Klin in Moscow Oblast, and in Konakovsky and Kalininsky Districts and the city of Tver of Tver Oblast. The suburban trains have their southeastern terminus at Moscow Leningradsky railway station in Moscow. In the northwestern direction, the suburban trains terminate at Kryukovo, Podsolnechnaya, Klin, Konakovo GRES, and Tver. The line is served by October Railway. This is in contrast to all other suburban directions from Moscow, which are served by Moscow Railway.

The suburban railway line follows the Moscow – Saint Petersburg Railway which connects Moscow with Saint Petersburg via Tver and Bologoye. It is electrified everywhere between Moscow and Saint Petersburg.

== History ==
The railway between Moscow and Saint Petersburg was opened on November 1, 1851 and is the second oldest railway in Russia. In 1950, it was electrified between Moscow and Kryukovo, and in 1953, between Kryukovo and Klin. In 1957, the section between Klin and Kalinin (currently Tver) was electrified. In 1966, a branch to Konakovo was electrified as well.

In 1914, a railway connecting Klin and Vysokovsk was open. There was passenger traffic between Klin and Vysokovsk. The section was never electrified, and the passenger traffic was discontinued in the 1970s. In 2018, the line was demolished, since it was crossed by the M11 highway, and no bridge or tunnel was included to the construction project.

== Stations ==
Following the standard notations in Russia, a railway stop below is called a station if it is a terminus or if it has a cargo terminal, and it is called a platform (railway stop) otherwise.

=== Moscow to Tver ===
1. Moscow Leningradsky railway station, transfer to Komsomolskaya (Sokolnicheskaya line) and Komsomolskaya (Koltsevaya line) metro stations;
2. Rizhskaya (platform), Rizhskaya metro station;
3. Ostankino (platform), Butyrskaya metro station;
4. Petrovsko-Razumovskaya (platform), Petrovsko-Razumovskaya metro station;
5. Likhobory (platform), Likhobory station of Moscow Central Circle;
6. Mosselmash (platform);
7. Grachyovskaya (platform);
8. Khovrino (platform), Khovrino metro station;
9. Levoberezhnaya (platform);
10. Khimki (station);
11. Molzhaninovo (platform);
12. Novopodrezkovo (platform);
13. Podrezkovo (platform);
14. Skhodnya (station);
15. Firsanovskaya (platform);
16. Malino (platform);
17. Kryukovo (station);
18. Alabushevo (platform);
19. Radishchevo (platform);
20. Povarovka (platform);
21. Povarovo-1 (station);
22. Beryozki-Dachnyye (platform);
23. Podsolnechnaya (station);
24. Senezh (platform);
25. Golovkovo (platform);
26. Pokrovka (platform);
27. Frolovskoye (platform);
28. Streglovo (platform);
29. Klin (station);
30. Yamuga (platform);
31. Reshetnikovo (station);
32. Chernichnaya (platform);
33. Zavidovo (station);
34. Moskovskoye More (platform);
35. Redkino (station);
36. Mezhevo (platform);
37. Kuzminka (platform);
38. Chupriyanovka (platform);
39. Lazurnaya (platform, formally in operation, but trains do not stop there);
40. Tver (station).

=== Reshetnikovo to Konakovo GRES ===
1. Reshetnikovo (station);
2. Puteprovodnaya (platform);
3. Konakovsky Mokh (station);
4. Donkhovka (platform);
5. Konakovo GRES (station).
