= Moscow Leningradsky railway station =

Railway station in Moscow, Russia

Moscow–Leningradsky Москва–Ленинградская
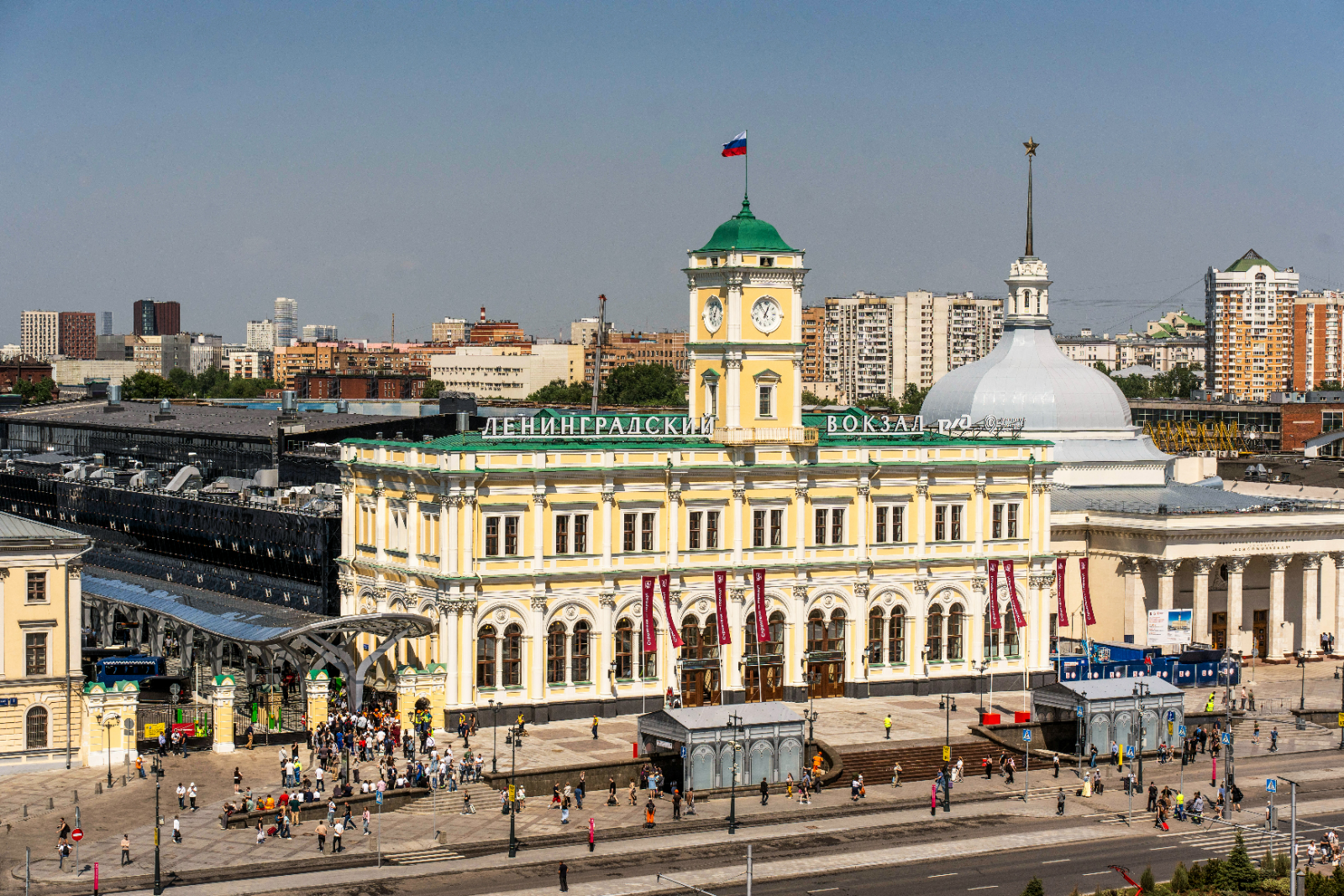
- View from Komsomolskaya Square.

General information
- Other names: Moscow Passazhirskaya
- Location: Komsomolskaya Square, 3, Moscow, Russia
- Coordinates: 55.776111°N 37.655278°E
- System: October Railway terminal
- Owner: Russian Railways
- Operator: October Railway
- Line: Saint Petersburg–Moscow railway
- Platforms: 6
- Tracks: 10
- Connections: Moscow Metro stations: Komsomolskaya; Komsomolskaya; Tram: 7, 13, 37, 50; Bus: 40, 122, А; Trolleybus: 14, 41

Other information
- Station code: 060073
- Fare zone: 0

History
- Opened: 1851
- Rebuilt: 1903, 1977
- Former names: Peterburgsky, Nikolaevsky, Oktyabrsky

Services
Preceding station	Russian Railways	Following station
Rizhskaya towards Tver	Leningradsky Suburban	Terminus
Tver towards St. Petersburg–Glavny	Sapsan	Terminus
Location
- Location within Moscow Ring Road

Moscow Leningradsky railway station (IATA: ZKD) (Russian: Ленинградский вокзал, Leningradsky vokzal) is the oldest of Moscow's ten railway terminals. Situated on Komsomolskaya Square, the station serves north-western directions, notably Saint Petersburg. International services from the station include Tallinn, Estonia, operated by GoRail, and Helsinki, Finland. It is the only Moscow railway terminal operated by October Railway rather than Moscow Railway.

== History ==
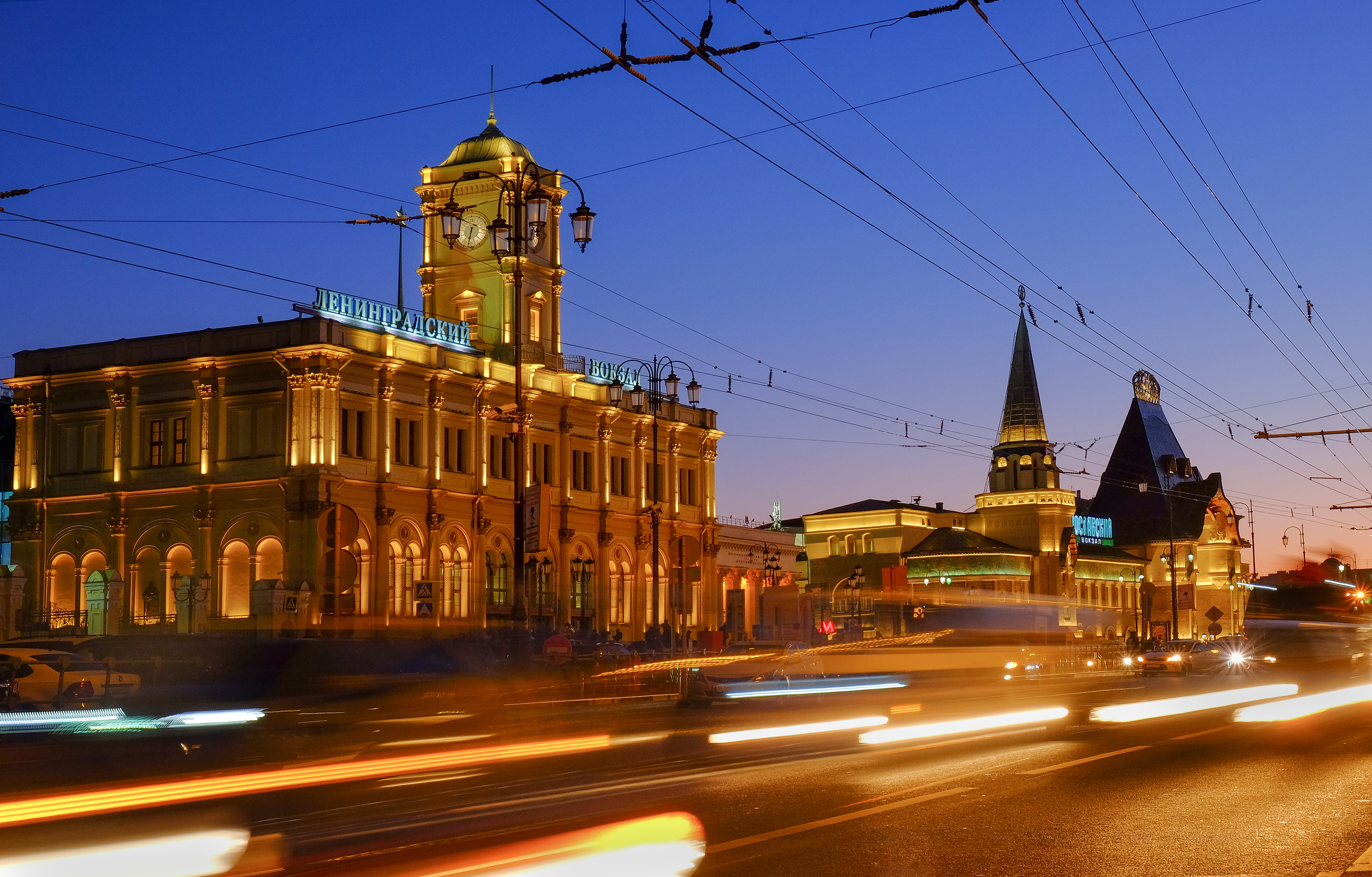
Leningradsky railway station at night

The station was constructed between 1844 and 1851 to an eclectic design by Konstantin Thon as the terminus of the Moscow-Saint Petersburg Railway, a pet project of Emperor Nicholas I. Regular connection was opened in 1851. Initially it was known as Peterburgsky (i.e., St Petersburg station). Upon the Emperor's death five years later, the station was named Nikolayevsky (and the railway Nikolayevskaya) after him and retained this name until 1924, when the Bolsheviks renamed it Oktyabrsky terminal (and the corresponding railway to October railway), to commemorate the October Revolution. The present name was given in 1937.

Thon's design follows closely that of the station's counterpart in St. Petersburg. The monotonous regularity of rustication and pilasters is enlivened with Italianate details (ground floor windows strongly reminiscent of the Palazzo Rucellai) and an elegant clocktower at the centre (probably inspired by the Palazzo Senatorio in Rome). Even more rigorous is the exterior of the nearby Moscow Customs House (1844–1852), also by Thon. The interior of the station was modernized and renovated in 1950 and 1972.

=== Renovation 2008-2013 ===
From 2008-2013, Leningradsky station underwent a renovation of both interior and exterior elements. The façade of the building was repaired and returned to its historic colour scheme, while the interior was configured with a new mezzanine level for expanded retail and food spaces, with the main hall losing its Soviet era appearance as a result. Digital information boards showing arrival and departure information was also installed. The bust of Vladimir Lenin which was installed in 1975 was removed from the main hall and was stored at the Museum of the Moscow Railway (Moscow Rizhsky station). A monument to Konstantin Thon was installed on the exterior of the station, while a fountain of Saint George and the Dragon was placed between the station and Komsomolskaya Metro Station.

Leningradsky railway station following renovations in 2013

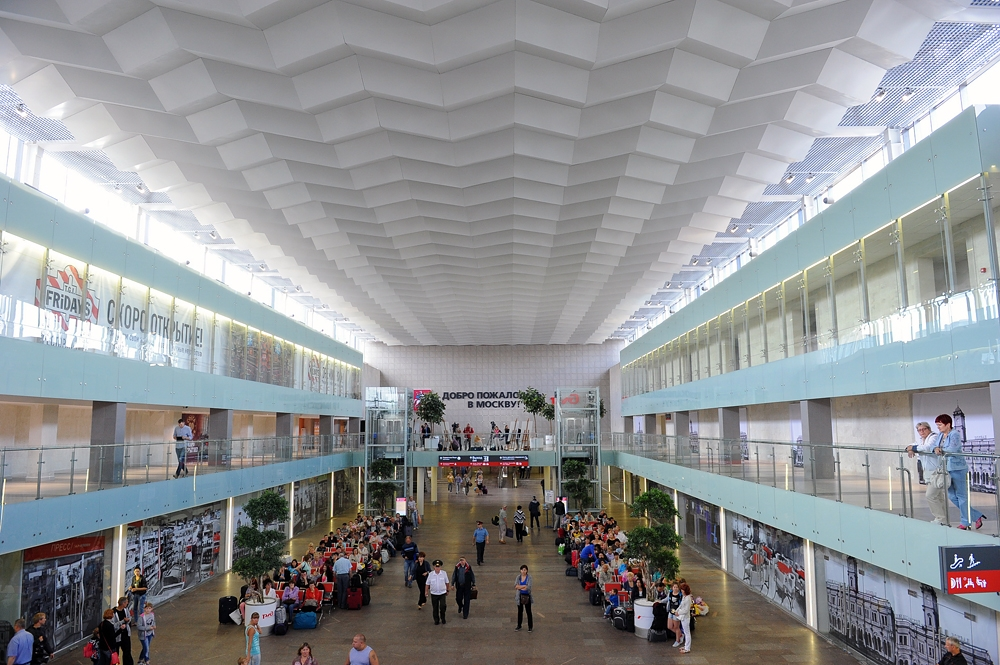

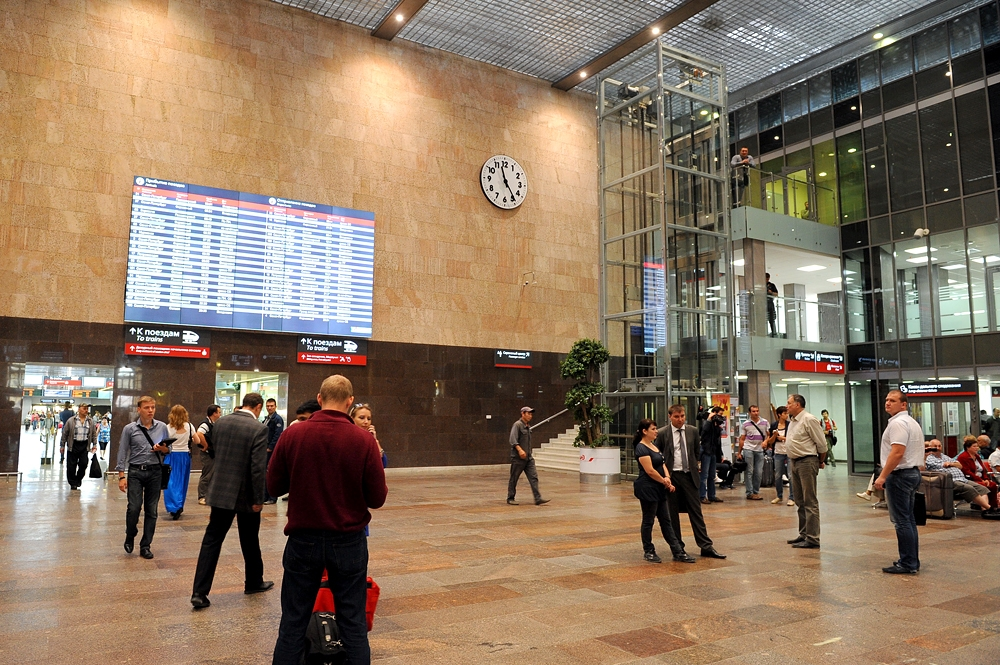

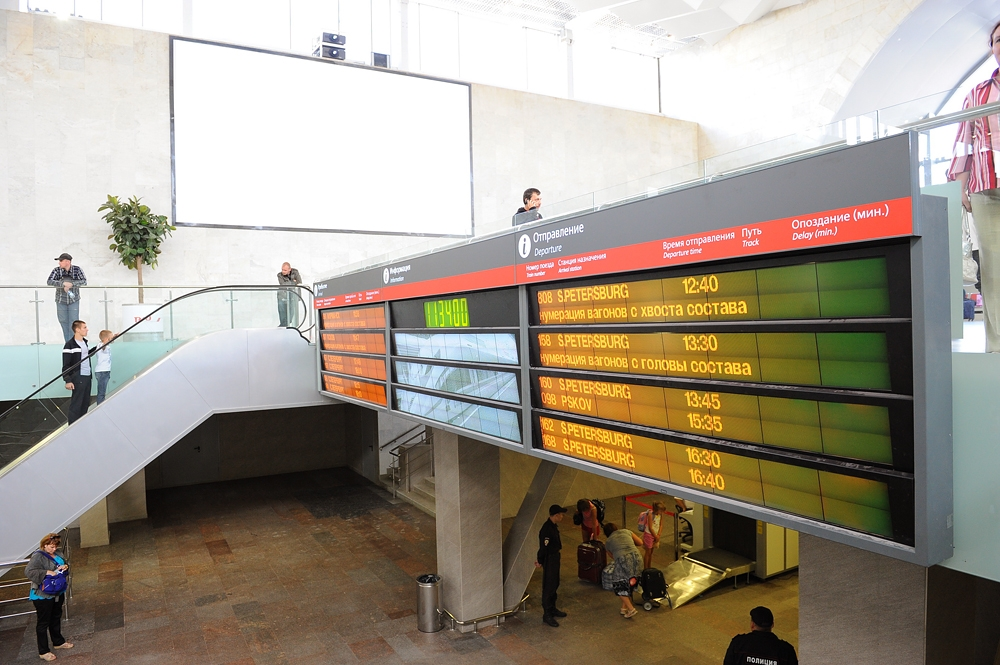

=== Renovation 2024-2026 ===
Major renovation work on the station took place from 11 August 2024 to 22 May 2026. The station underwent a comprehensive overhaul aimed at the restoration of the historic structure, while upgrading the facility for modern use.

Leningradsky railway station following renovations in 2026

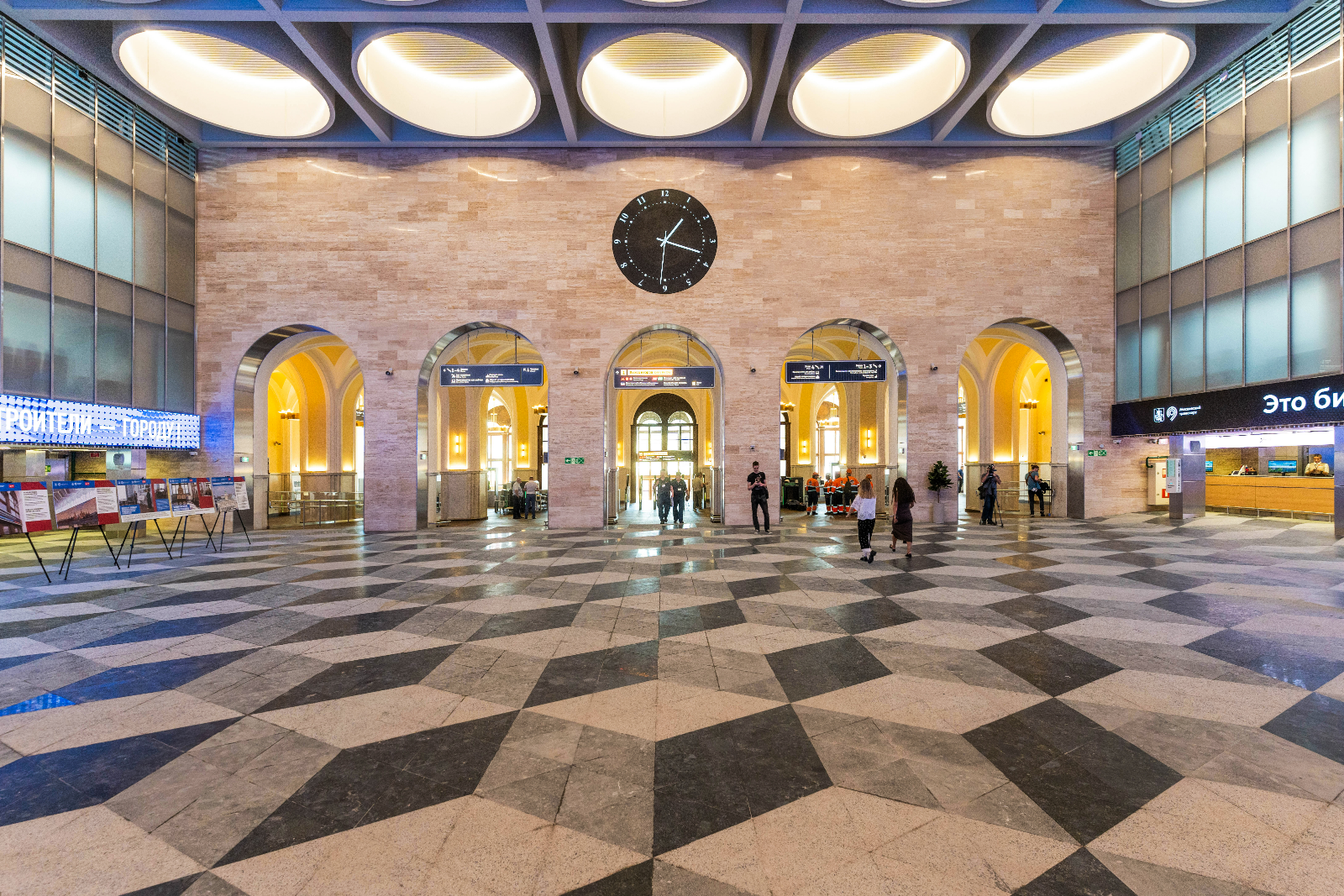

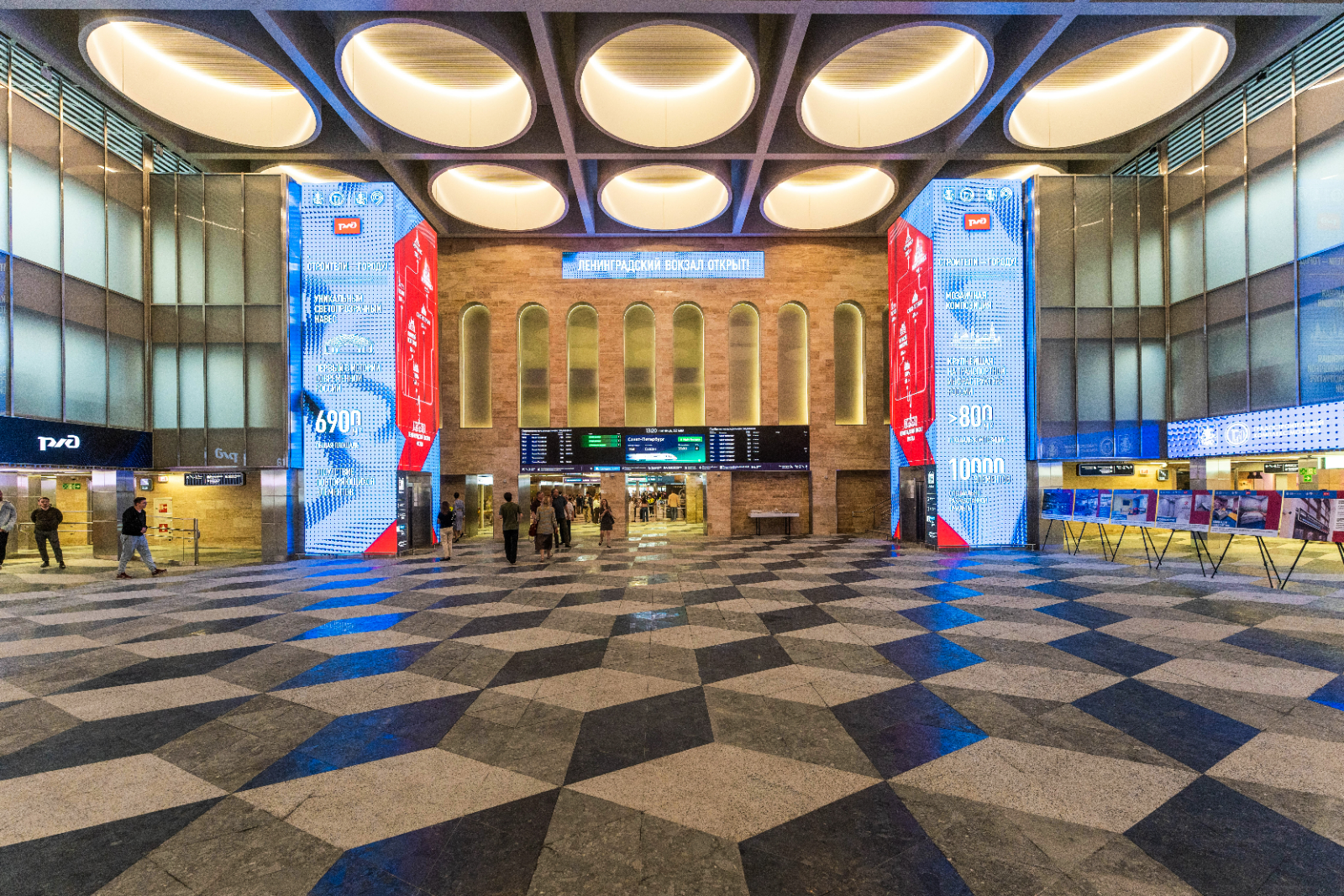

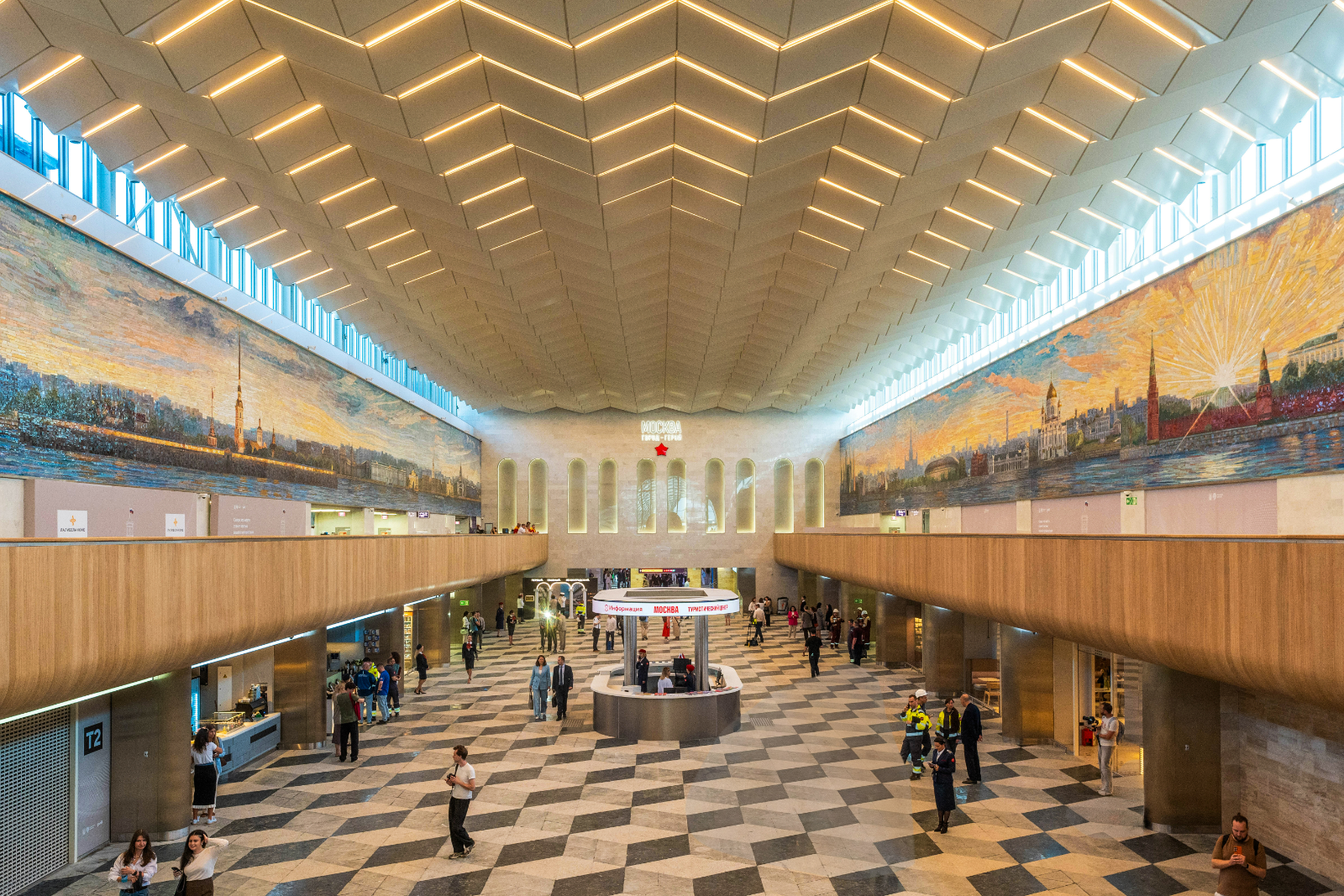

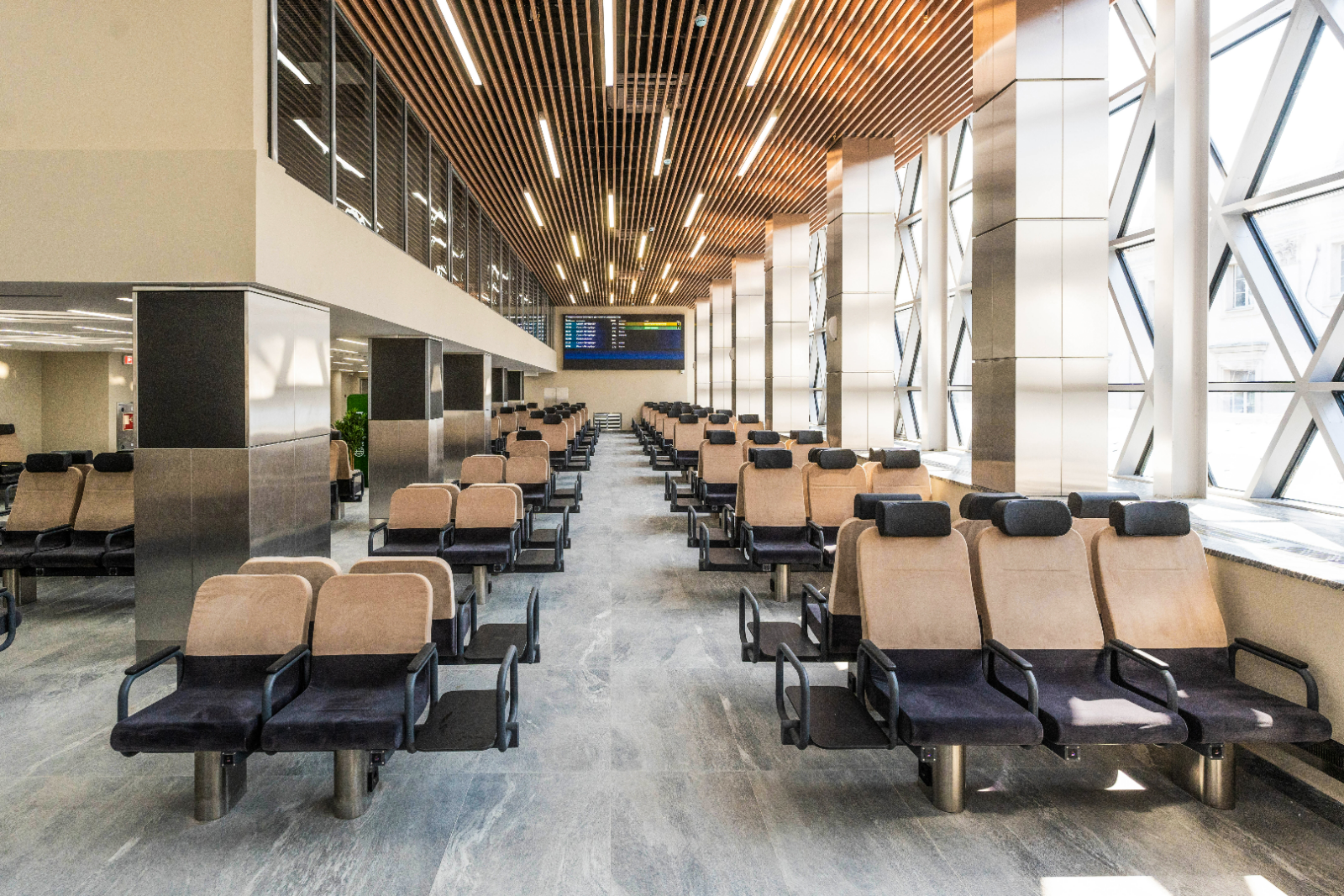

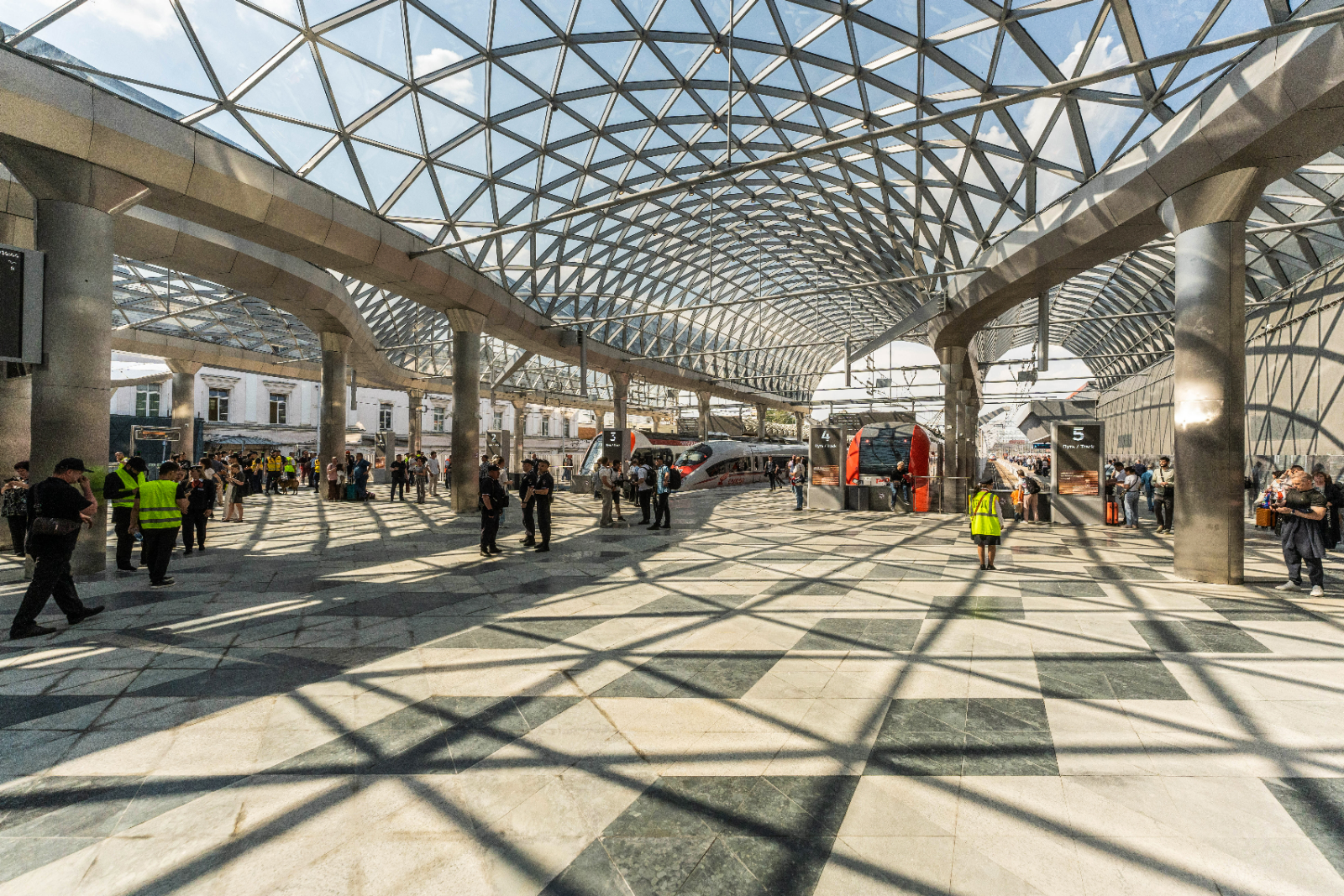

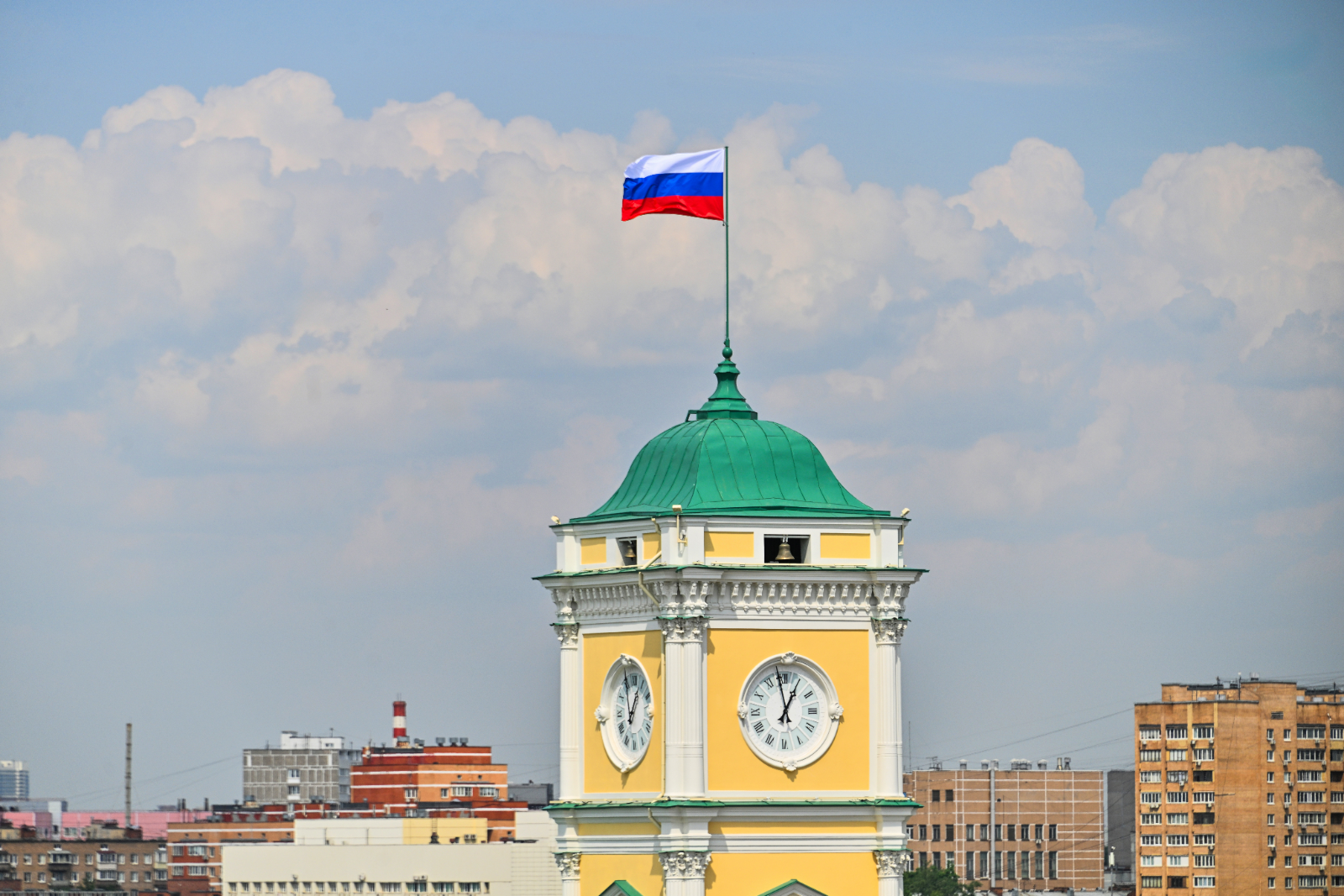

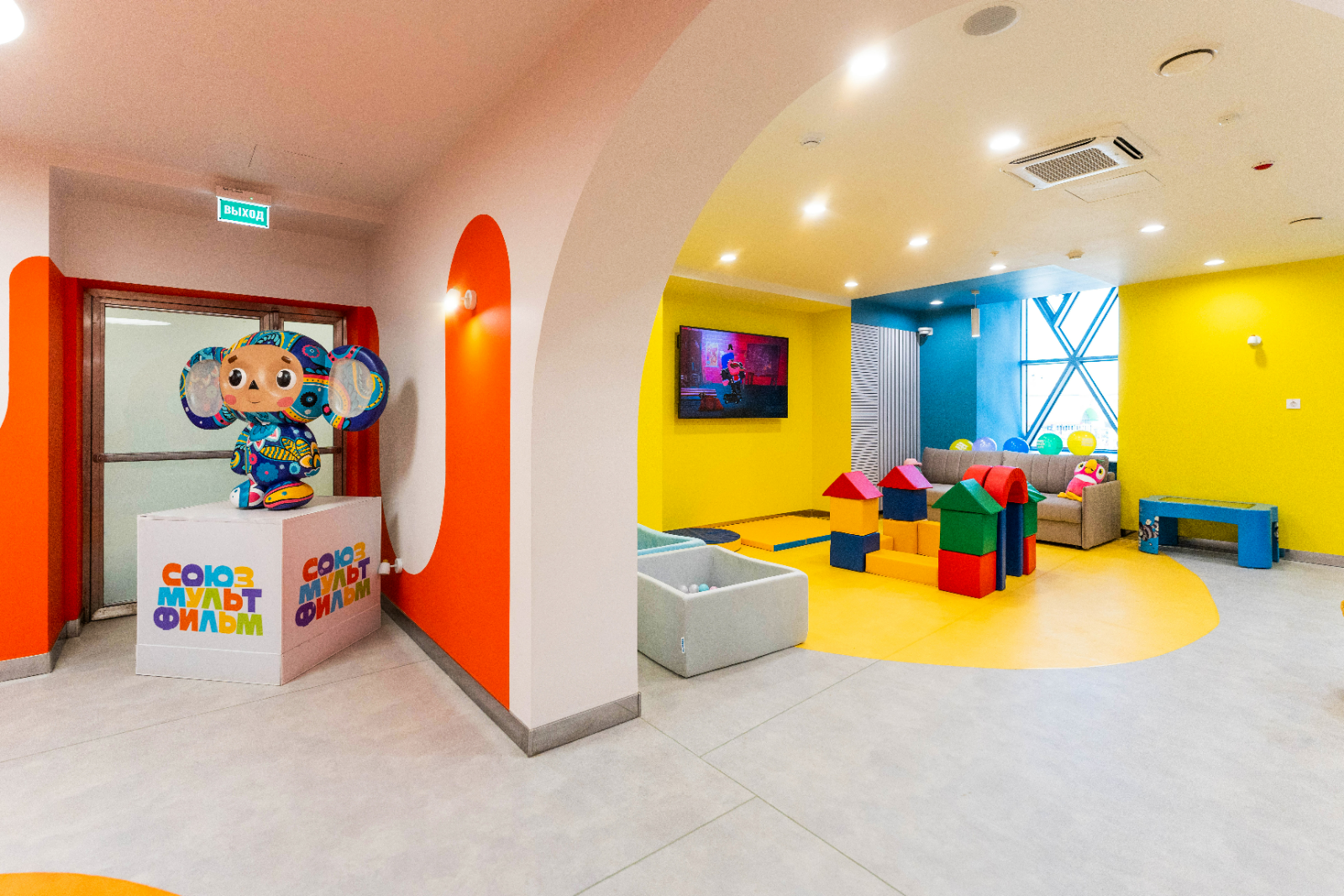

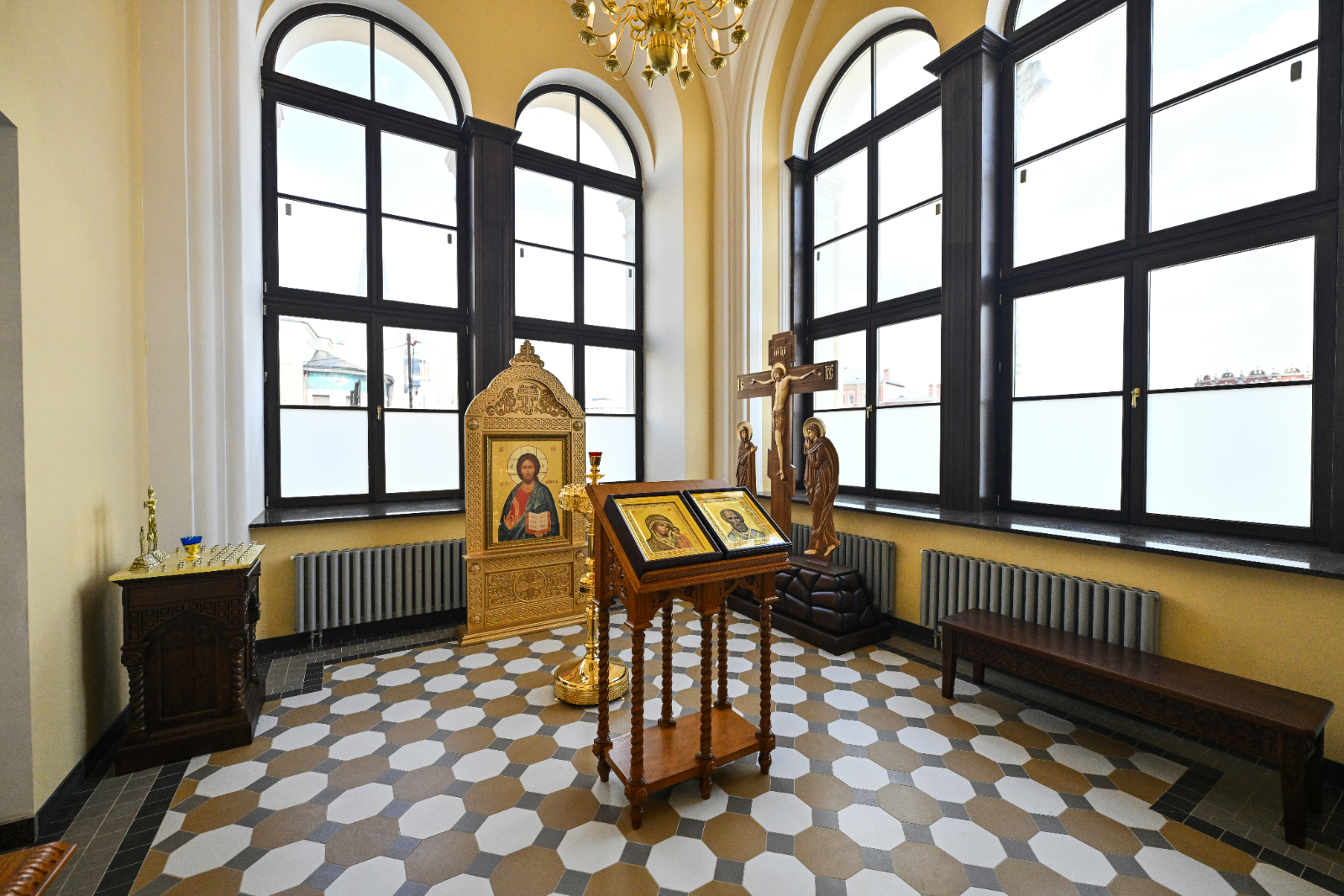

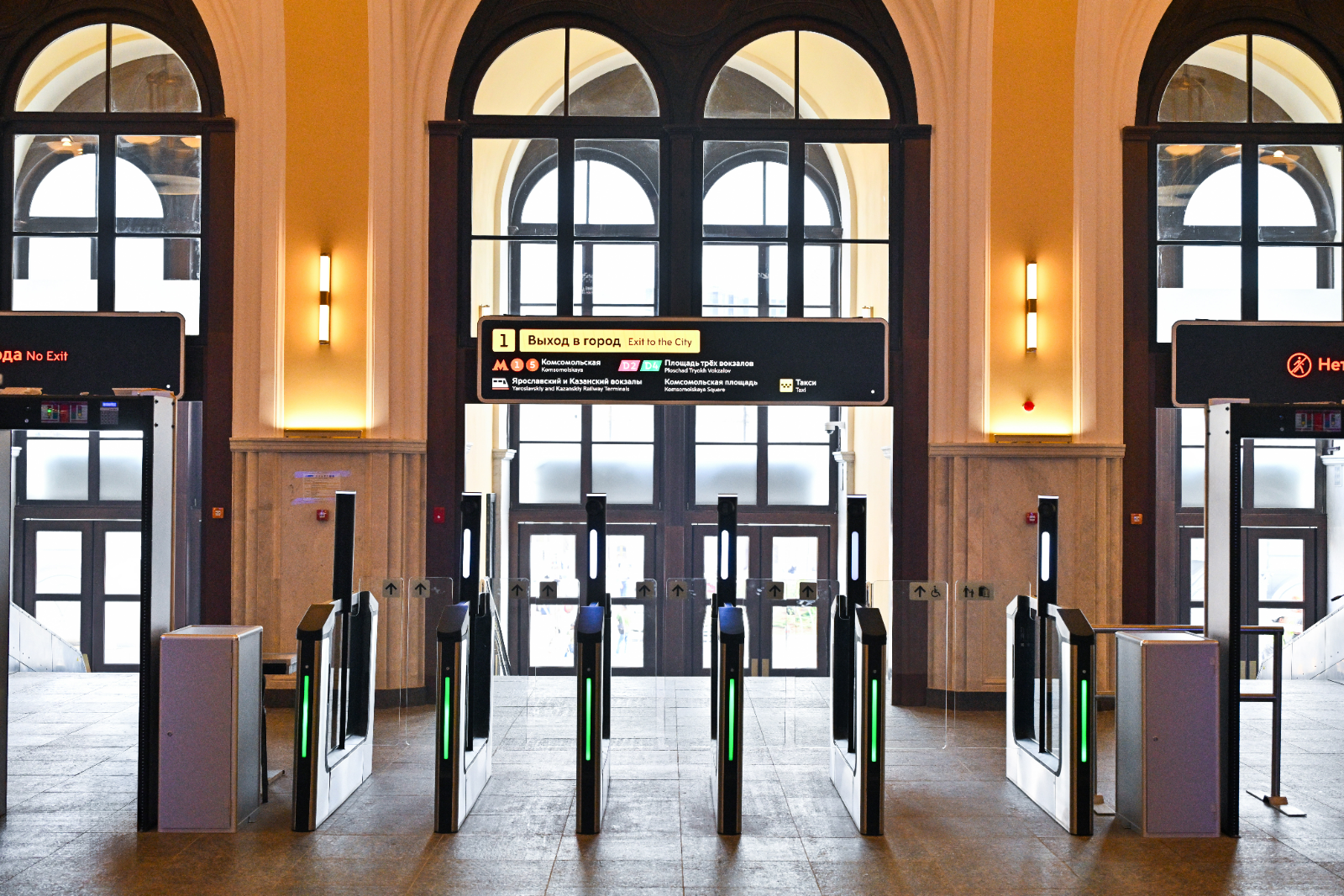

The renovation extensively restored the 19th century façade by Konstantin Thon, while doubling usable passenger space, increasing seating capacity and introducing digital navigation systems. Updated typography and visual design elements were developed by Art. Lebedev Studio, while engineering work was carried out by Mosinzhproektin in consultation with the Moscow CIty Department of Cultural Heritage. Two large murals of Moscow and Saint Petersburg, created by artist Maxim Kozlov, were installed in the main hall. Further additions included the restoration of the stations chapel, installation of a new heading system, and updated medical and security facilities.

The layout of the station was reconfigured to support future integration with the under construction Moscow–Saint Petersburg high-speed railway. New concourses and platform canopies were built, along with an connection to Komsomolskaya Metro Station.

Following the completion of renovation work at Leningradsky, it was announced that the nearby Yaroslavsky railway station would undergo renovation, combining the three stations into a unified transport hub.

== Destinations ==
=== Long distance from Moscow ===
Train number	Train name	Destination	Operated by
001/002	Krasnaya Strela (rus: Красная стрела)	(Russia) St. Petersburg (Moskovsky)	(Russia) Russian Railways
003/004	Express (rus: Экспресс)	(Russia) St. Petersburg (Moskovsky)	(Russia) Russian Railways
005/006	Double-deck coach (rus: Двухэтажный состав)	(Russia) St. Petersburg (Moskovsky)	(Russia) Russian Railways
007/008	Double-deck coach (rus: Двухэтажный состав)	(Russia) St. Petersburg (Moskovsky)	(Russia) Russian Railways
009/010	Pskov (rus: Псков)	(Russia) Pskov	(Russia) Russian Railways
011/012	Alexander Nevsky (rus: Александр Невский)	(Russia) St. Petersburg (Moskovsky)	(Russia) Russian Railways
015/016	Arktika (rus: Арктика)	(Russia) Murmansk	(Russia) Russian Railways
017/018	Karelia (rus: Карелия)	(Russia) Petrozavodsk	(Russia) Russian Railways
019/020	Megapolis (rus: Мегаполис)	(Russia) St. Petersburg (Moskovsky)	(Russia) Tverskoy Express
025/026	Smena/A. Betankur (rus: Смена/А. Бетанкур)	(Russia) St. Petersburg (Moskovsky)	(Russia) Russian Railways
027/028	Severnaya Palmira (rus: Северная Пальмира)	(Russia) St. Petersburg (Moskovsky)	(Russia) Russian Railways
037/038	Afanasiy Nikitin (rus: Афанасий Никитин)	(Russia) St. Petersburg (Moskovsky)	(Russia) Russian Railways
053/054	Grand Express (rus: Гранд Экспресс)	(Russia) St. Petersburg (Moskovsky)	(Russia) Grand Service Express
063/064	Dve Stolitsy (rus: Две Столицы)	(Russia) St. Petersburg (Moskovsky)	(Russia) Russian Railways
747/748	Nevsky express (rus: Невский Экспресс)	(Russia) St. Petersburg (Moskovsky)	(Russia) Russian Railways
725Ч/726Ч	Lastochka (rus: Ласточка)	(Russia) St. Petersburg (Moskovsky)	(Russia) Russian Railways

There are also numerous ordinary long range trains to these directions.

=== High-speed rail ===
Train number	Train name	Destination	Operated by
751/752; 753/754; 755/756; 757/758; 759/760; 761/762; 763/764; 765/766; 767/768; 769/770; 771/772; 773/774; 775/776; 777/778; 779/780; 781/782	Sapsan (rus: Сапсан)	(Russia) St. Petersburg (Moskovsky)	(Russia) Russian Railways

High-speed commuter rail Since 1 October 2015, Siemens Desiro RUS high speed commuter trains operating on Moscow-Tver and Moscow-Kryukovo (Zelenograd) routes. The major stops on the route are:Khimki, Kryukovo (Zelenograd), Podsolnechnaya (Solnechnogorsk) and Klin.

=== Other destinations ===
Country	Destinations
Russia	Bologoye, Borovichi, Ostashkov, Tver, Velikie Luki, Veliky Novgorod, Zelenograd (Kryukovo)

=== Suburban destinations ===
Suburban commuter trains (elektrichka) connect Leningradsky station with stations and platforms of the Leningradsky suburban railway line, in particular, with the towns of Khimki, Zelenograd (Kryukovo), Solnechnogorsk (Podsolnechnaya), Klin, Konakovo, and Tver.

== Gallery ==
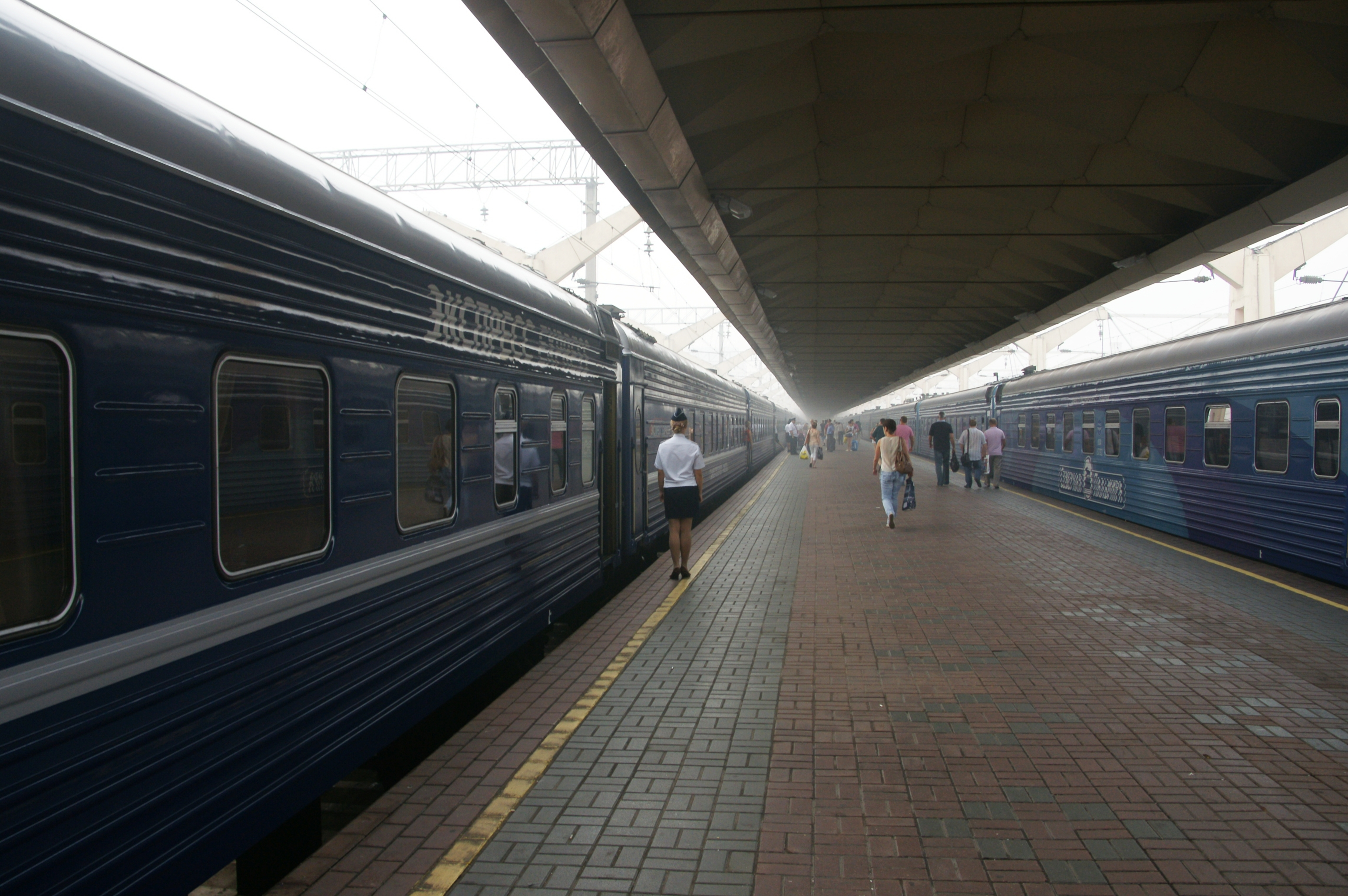
The platform of the Leningrad station in 2010.

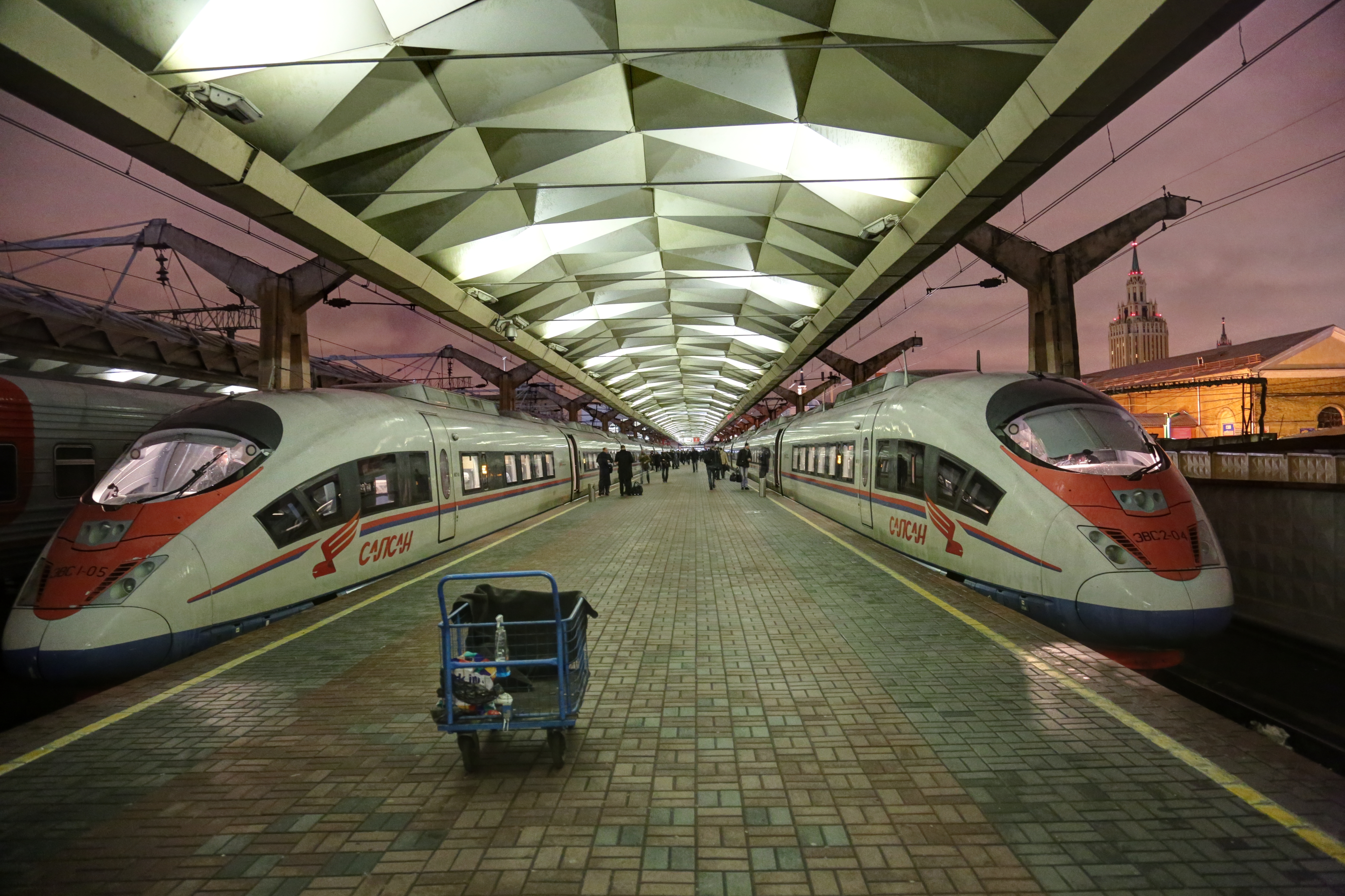
Express Moscow—St. Petersburg Sapsan at the Leningradsky Railway Station

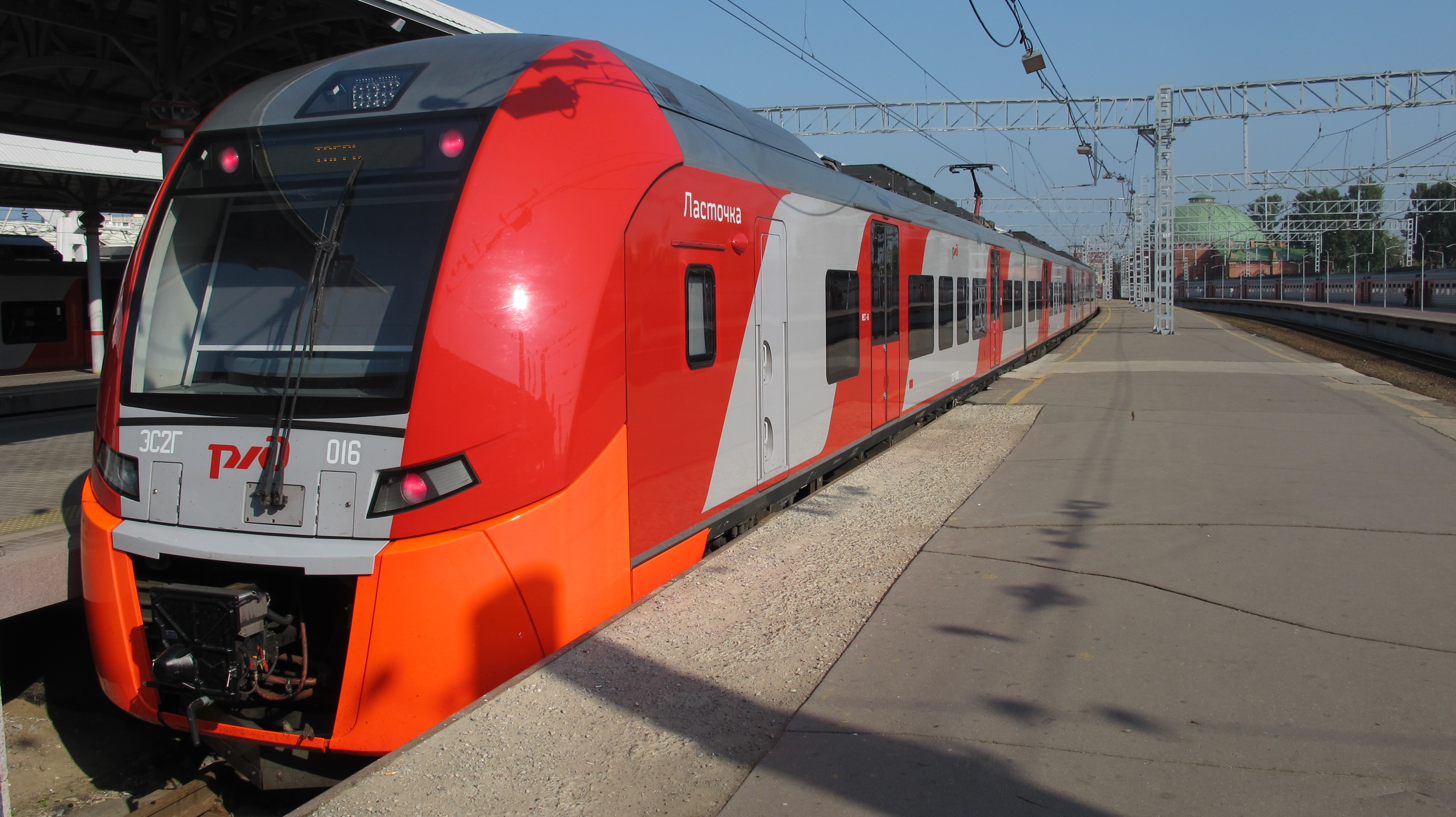
Electric train Lastochka (eng. Swallow) ES2G-016 Moscow-Tver at the Leningradsky railway station

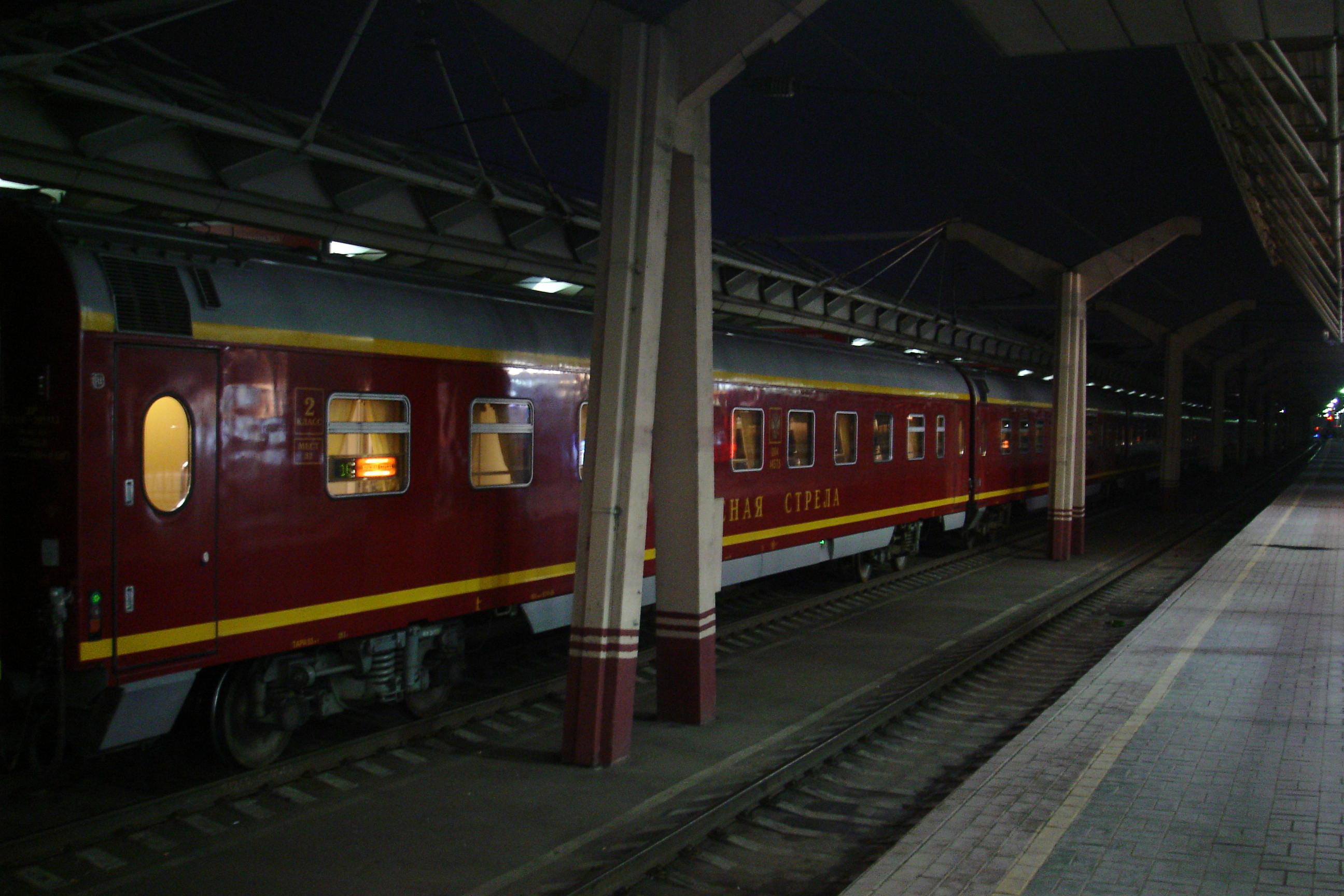
Overnight sleeper train "Red Arrow" at the Leningrad station in Moscow

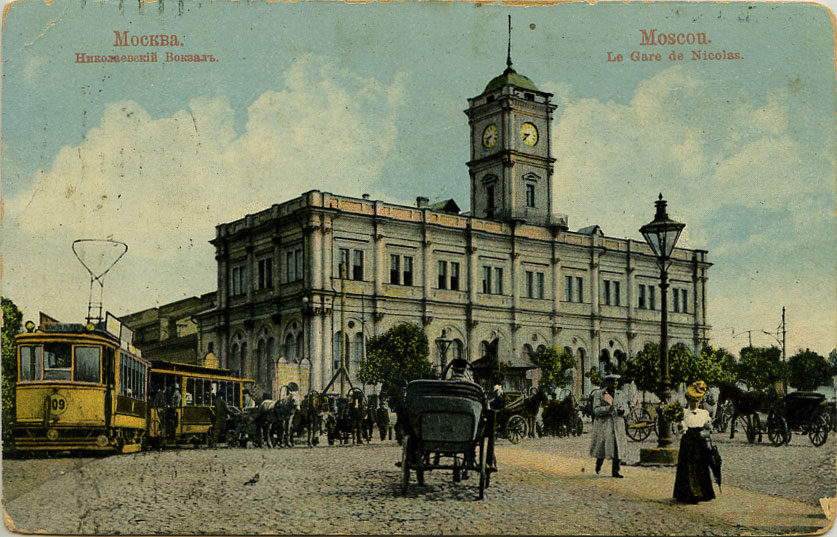
Historical view of the station (1900)

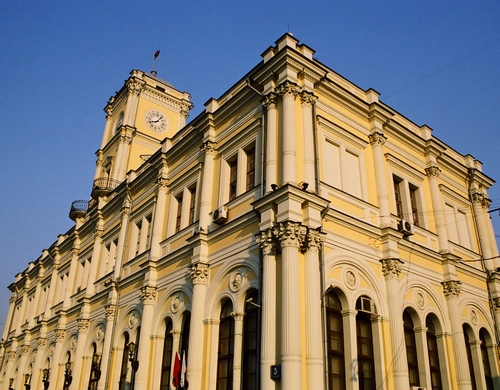
View from Komsomolskaya (Koltsevaya Line) metro station

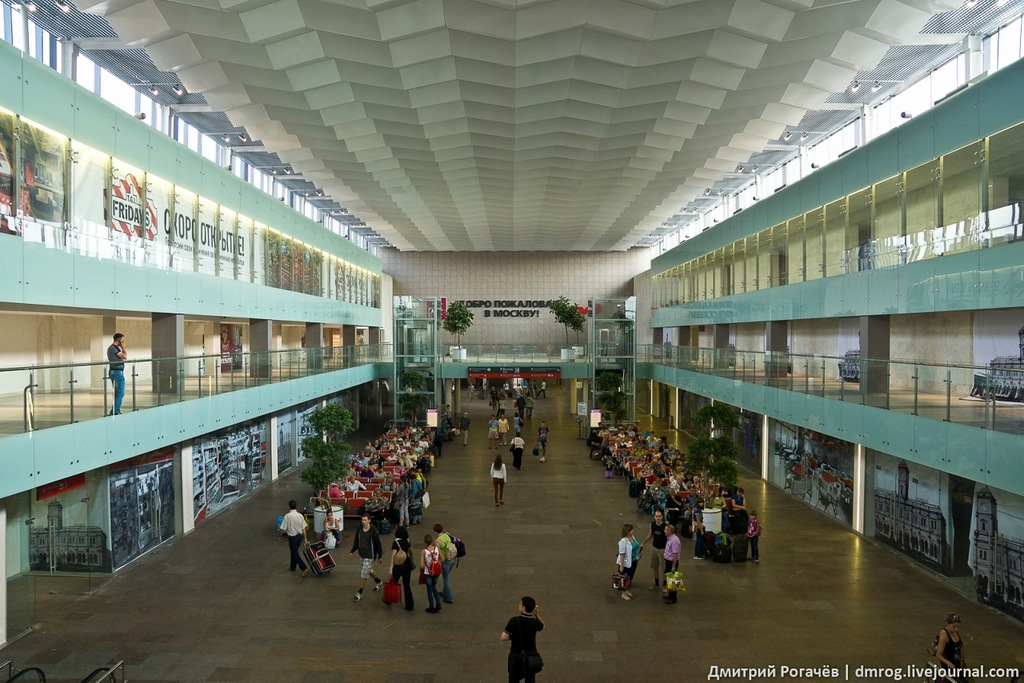
Leningradsky railway station after reconstruction

Aliexpress pavilion at the Leningrad station
