= Tver railway station =

Railway station in Tver, Russia

Tver Тверь
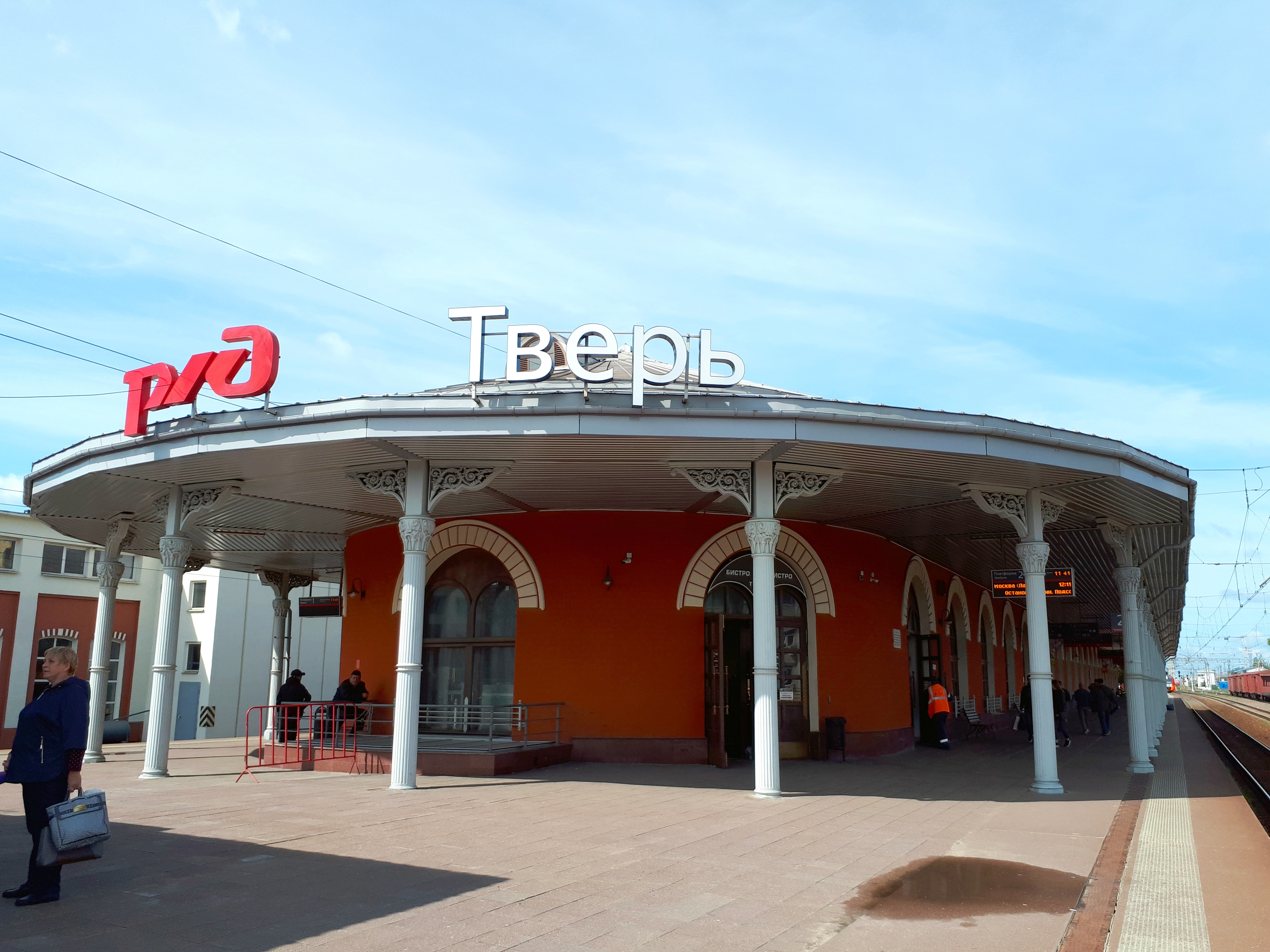

General information
- Location: Ulitsa Kominterna, 18; Tver, Tver Oblast; Russia
- Coordinates: 56.8352°N 35.8928°E
- Owner: Russian Railways
- Operator: October Railway
- Line: Saint Petersburg–Moscow railway
- Platforms: 1
- Tracks: 8

Construction
- Structure type: Heritage

History
- Opened: 1850

Services
Preceding station	Russian Railways	Following station
Vyshniy Volochyok towards St. Petersburg–Glavny	Sapsan	Moscow Leningradsky Terminus
Terminus	Leningradsky Suburban	Lazurnaya towards Moscow Leningradsky
Location

Tver (Russian: Тверь) is one of the major stations of the Saint Petersburg–Moscow railway located in the city of Tver, administrative center of Tver Oblast, Russia. It was opened on 1850 during the Russian Empire period.

== Services ==
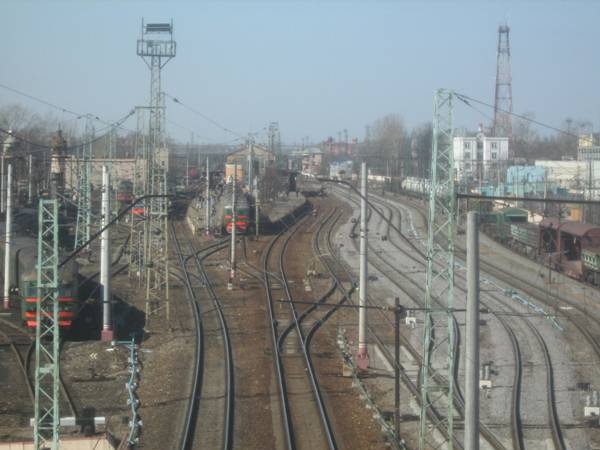
Railway tracks at the station. Taken on 2008

The suburban trains on the Leningradsky suburban railway line are terminated from Moscow Leningradsky. Long-distance trains also served this station within directions: Moscow, Nizhny Novgorod, Helsinki, Vyshny Volochyok, Likhoslavl, Zelenograd, Saratov, Tosno, Bologoye and Adler.

== History ==
Tver station on the Petersburg-Moscow railway line was opened on the 29th June 1850, it was classified as a Class 1 station. The name of the station was approved by the Ministry for Railways in December 1850. In 1863 the station received its present-day name. Also built in the station complex was a circular depot with 22 bays and a railway turntable, an island railway station, and a water tower. On the 15th July 1864 a line was built to a wharf on the Volga river, funded by the Nikolayevskaya Railway, with a length of 4,854 versts (5178 kilometers). In 1868, this line was transferred to the Main Society for Russian Railways. In 1882, an access road was built from this line to the flour mill of the Konyaev brothers, with a length of 92 sazhens (196 meters).
