= Rizhsky suburban railway line =

Railway line in Russia

Rizhsky Suburban Railway

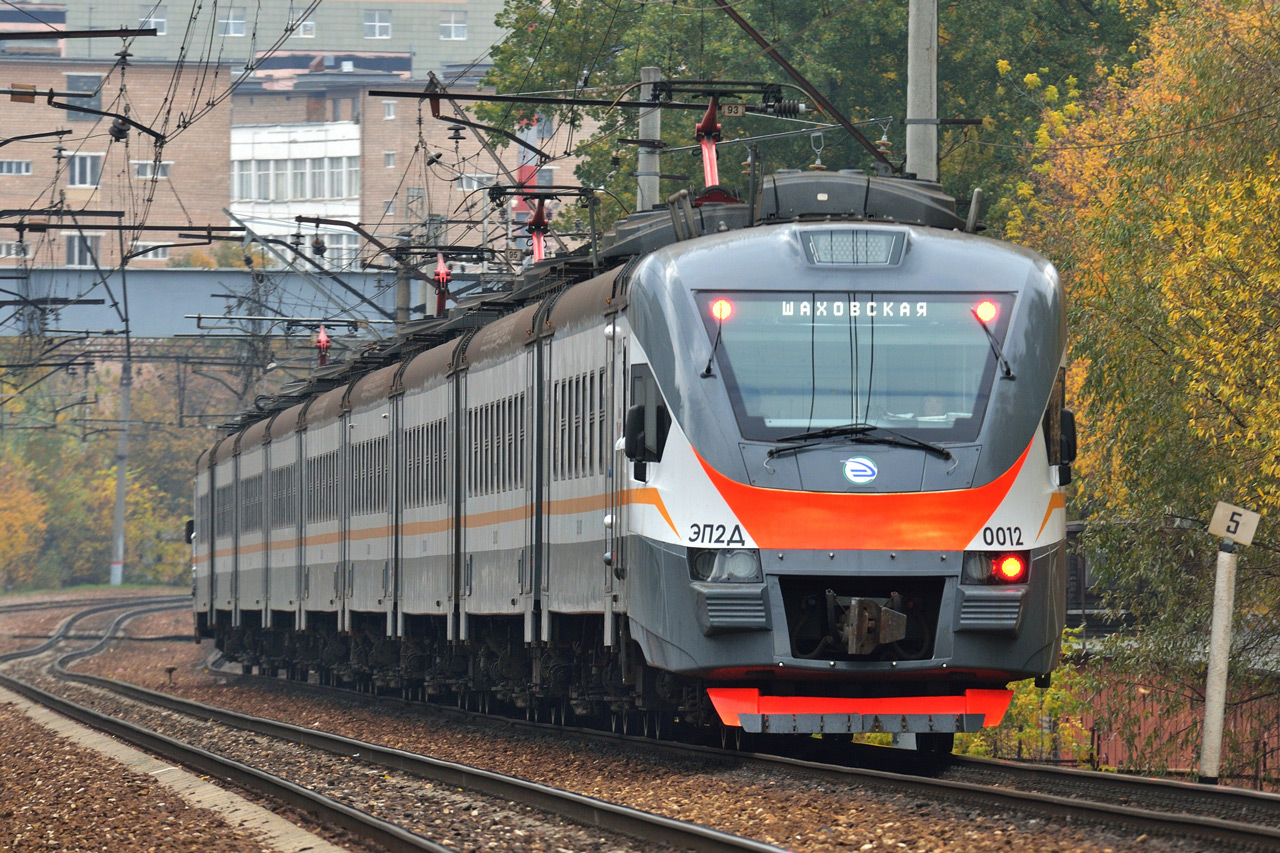
- A CSPC EP2D train traversing on the Rizhsky suburban railway line.

Overview
- Native name: Рижское направление Московской железной дороги
- Status: Operational
- Owner: Russian Railways
- Locale: Moscow and Moscow Oblast
- Termini: Shakhovskaya; Moscow Rizhsky
- Stations: 44

Service
- Type: Commuter rail
- System: Moscow Railway; Moscow Central Diameters (Rizhsky–Nakhabino)
- Operator(s): Central Suburban Passenger Company; Russian Railways

History
- Opened: 30 June 1901

Technical
- Line length: 155 km (96 mi)
- Track gauge: 1,520 mm (4 ft 11 27/32 in) Russian gauge
- Electrification: 3 kV DC overhead line

The Rizhsky suburban railway line (Russian: Рижское направление Московской железной дороги) is one of eleven suburban railway lines used for connections between Moscow, Russia, and surrounding areas, mostly in Moscow Oblast. The Rizhsky suburban railway line connects Moscow with the station in the northwest, in particular, with the towns of Krasnogorsk, Dedovsk, Istra, and Volokolamsk. The stations the line serves are located in Moscow, as well as in the towns of Krasnogorsk, Istra, Volokolamsk, and the urban-type settlement of Shakhovskaya in Moscow Oblast. Some of the suburban trains have their southeastern terminus at Streshnevo and Moscow Rizhsky railway station in Moscow, others commute from the Kursky suburban railway line. In the northwestern direction, the suburban trains terminate at Nakhabino, Dedovsk, Novoiyerusalimskaya, Rumyantsevo, Volokolamsk, and Shakhovskaya. The suburban railway line is served by the Moscow Railway subsidiary of Russian Railways with the join stock of CSPC. The tracks between Moscow Rizhsky railway station and Nakhabino are also used by Line D2, one of the Moscow Central Diameters.

The suburban railway line follows the railway which connects Moscow with Riga via Rzhev and Velikiye Luki. It is electrified between Moscow and Shakhovskaya. Between Moscow and Volokolamsk, there are two tracks, west of Volokolamsk there is one track. The distance between Rizhsky railway station and Shakhovskaya is 155 kilometres (96 mi).

== History ==
The construction of the railway between Moscow and Vindava (Moscow–Vindava Railway) started in 1897. On June 30, 1901, the passenger traffic between Moscow and Volokolamsk was opened. Vindavsky railway station, currently Rizhsky railway station, was opened on September 11, 1901.

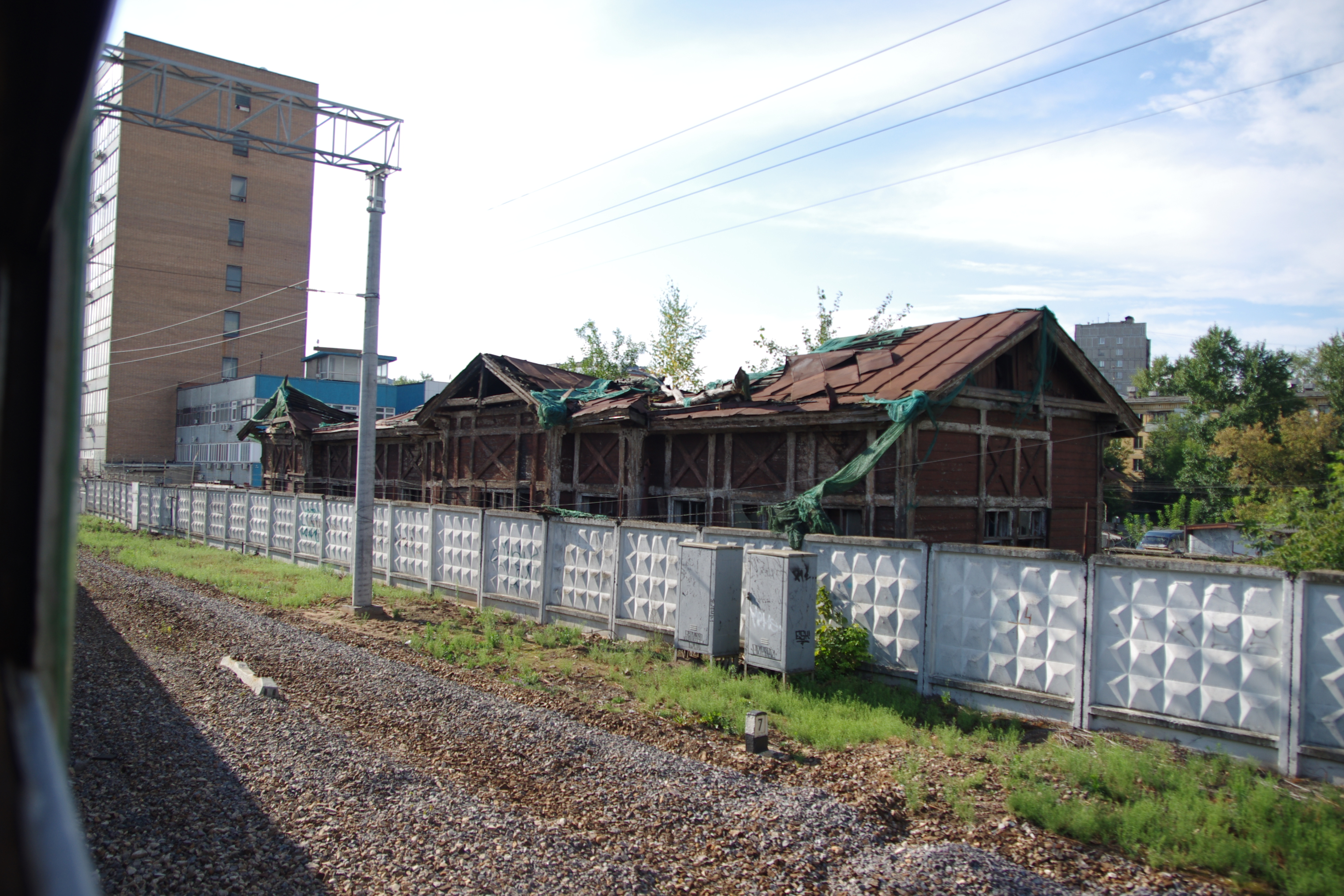
Temporary Moscow terminal building used in 1901 at Podmoskovnaya station (2012)

The railway had only one track; the construction of the second track between Moscow and Volokolamsk only started in the 1950s.

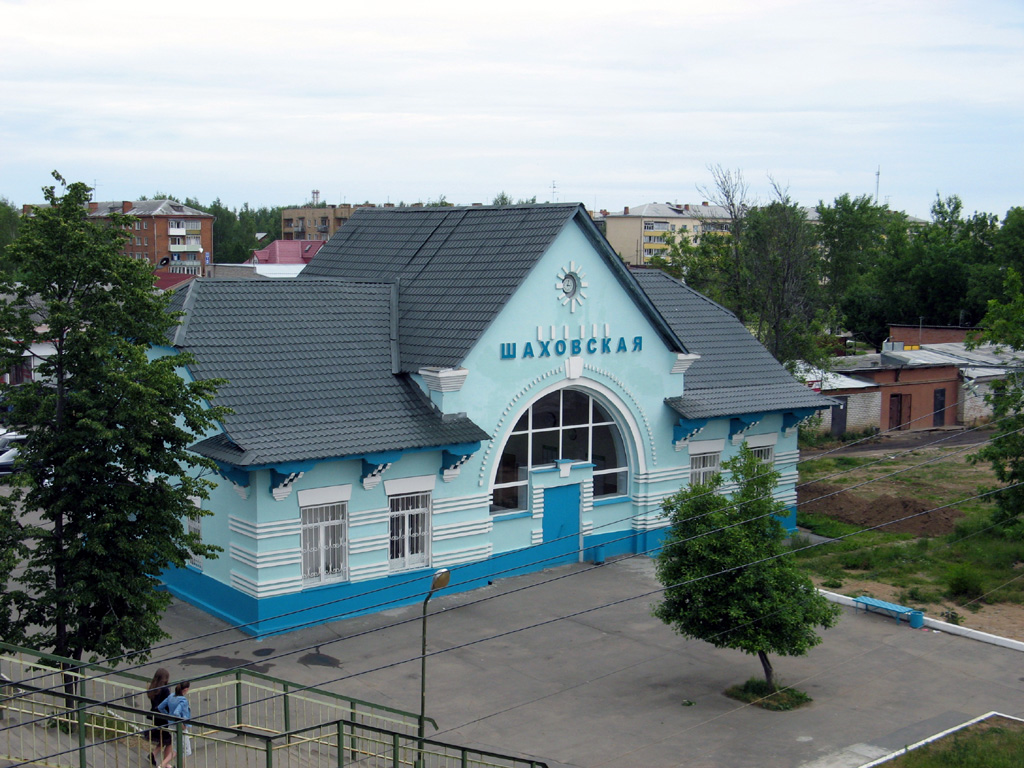
Shakhovskaya railway station

In 1945, the section between Moscow and Nakhabino was electrified. It was used by seventeen suburban trains per day in each direction. One of these trains continued to Lyublino, and sixteen others terminated at Rizhsky railway station. In 1954, the section to Guchkovo (currently Dedovsk) was electrified, and in 1955, the section to Novoiyerusalimskaya was electrified. In 1959, the line was transferred to Moscow Railway. In 1959, the electrification to Volokolamsk was completed, and for a long time Volokolamsk served as the end station of the line. The traffic between Volokolamsk and Rzhev was performed by steam engine-led trains, later by diesel trains. In 1990, direct trains from Moscow to Shakhovskaya were launched, but the section between Volokolamsk and Shakhovskaya was only electrified by 1991, so that the trains between 1990 and 1991 were pulled by a diesel locomotive between Volokolamsk and Shakhovskaya.

In the 1930s, a side one-track stretch between Nakhabino and Pavlovskaya Sloboda 55.804905°N 37.08758°E was built. Although there was no direct connection between Moscow and Pavlovskaya Sloboda, it was served by the same locomotives as the main direction. In 1964 the section was electrified. In the 1990s, the military installations in Pavlovskaya Sloboda were disestablished, and the number of passengers dropped. Following the general trend, the Russian Railways decided to close down the branch. It was closed down in 1996 and subsequently demolished.

In 2018 old Leningradskaya station was closed because of moving of the platform to the west towards Streshnevo station of the Moscow Central Circle. The new station was open on 1 October 2018, and on 12 June 2019 the interchange between Streshnevo and Leningradskaya (later renamed Streshnevo) started operation.

On 21 November 2019 Moscow Central Diameters started operation. Subsequently, Tushino, Leningradskaya, and Rzhevskaya were renamed to Tushinskaya, Streshnevo, and Rizhskaya to have common names with metro stations located close to them. On 25 June 2021, Pokrovskoye-Streshnevo was closed, and Shchukinskaya was opened.

== Stations ==
Following the standard notations in Russia, a railway stop is called a station if it is a terminus or if it handles freight, and is called a platform otherwise.

Station	Type	Connections	Coördinates
Shakhovskaya	station	onward to Rzhev	56.030137°N 35.511235°E
Podmoskovnyye Dachi	platform		
Bukholovo	platform		
Moskvich	platform		
Blagoveshchenskoye	station		
133 km	platform		
Volokolamsk	station		
Dubosekovo	platform		
Matryonino	platform		
Chismena	station		
Lesodolgorukovo	platform		
91 km	platform		
Ustinovka	platform		
Novopetrovskaya	platform		
Rumyantsevo	station		
Kursakovskaya	platform		
Yadroshino	platform		
73 km	platform		
Kholshchyoviki	station		
Chekhovskaya	platform		
Novoiyerusalimskaya	station		
Istra	platform		
Troitskaya	platform		
Manikhino I	station	Greater Ring of the Moscow Railway	
50 km	platform		
Snegiri	station		
Miitovskaya	platform		
Dedovsk	station		
Malinovka	platform		
Nakhabino	station		
Anikeyevka	platform		
Opalikha	platform		
Krasnogorskaya	platform		
Pavshino	station		
Penyagino	platform		
Volokolamskaya	platform	Volokolamskaya metro station	
Trikotazhnaya	platform		
Tushinskaya	station	Tushinskaya metro station	55.827215°N 37.440784°E
Shchukinskaya	platform	Shchukinskaya metro station	
Streshnevo	platform	Streshnevo MCC	
Streshnevo	platform	Voykovskaya metro station	
Krasny Baltiyets	platform		
Grazhdanskaya	platform		
Dmitrovskaya	platform	Dmitrovskaya metro station	
Moscow Rizhsky	station	Rizhskaya metro station	
