= Dmitrovskaya railway station (Rizhskoye line) =

Railway station in Moscow, Russia

Dmitrovskaya Дмитровская
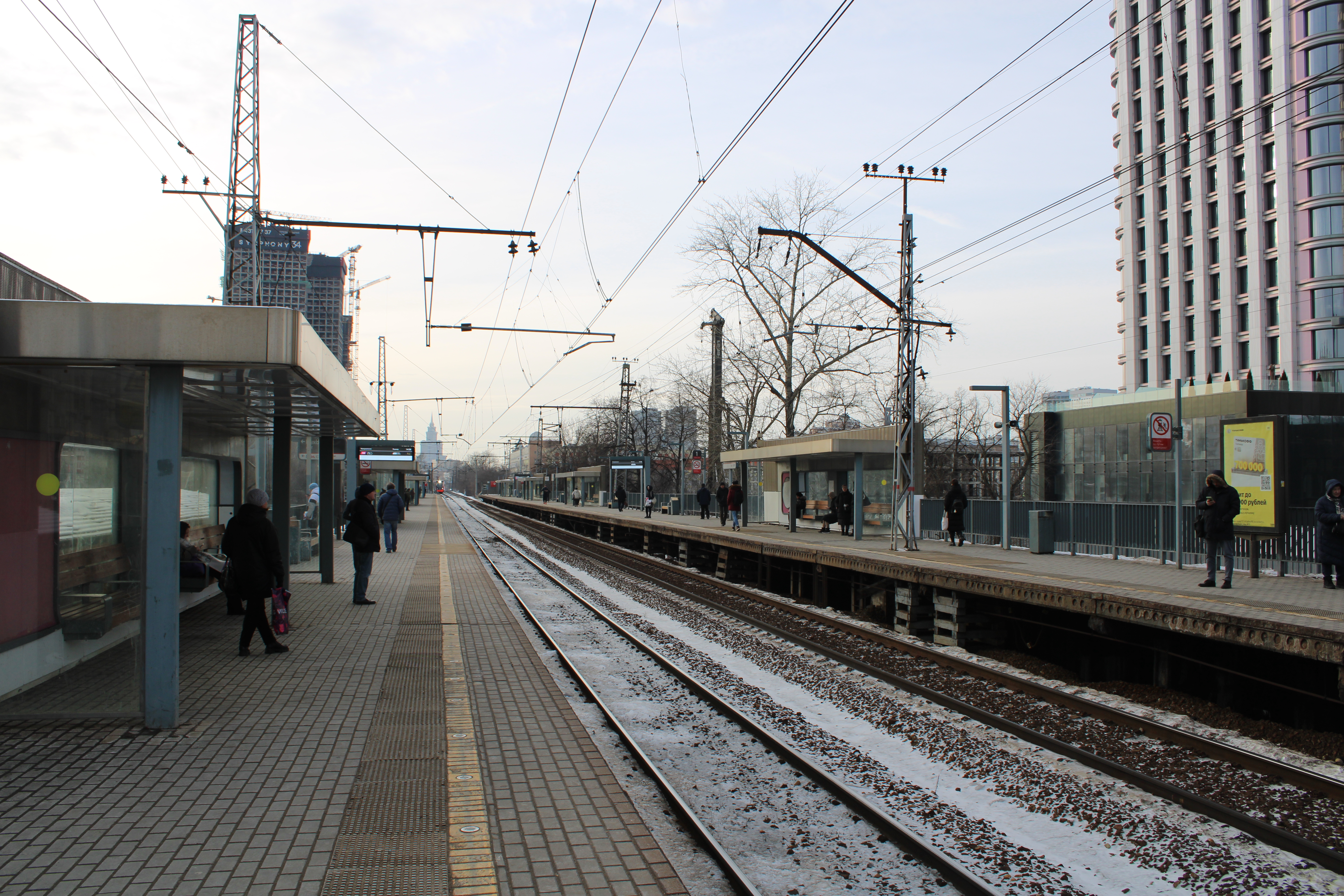
- Dmitrovskaya railway station in 2023

General information
- Location: Northern Administrative Okrug; Moscow; Russia
- Coordinates: 55.8079°N 37.5781°E
- Owner: Russian Railways
- Operator: Moscow Railway
- Line: Rizhsky Suburban Line
- Platforms: 2
- Tracks: 2
- Connections: Dmitrovskaya; Dmitrovskaya

Construction
- Structure type: At-grade
- Accessible: Yes

History
- Opened: 1964

Services
Preceding station	Moscow Central Diameters	Following station
Grazhdanskaya towards Nakhabino	Line D2	Maryina Roscha towards Podolsk
Location

Dmitrovskaya is the railway station of the Rizhsky suburban railway line located at the Northern Administrative Okrug, Moscow, Russia. The station is served by Line D2 of the Moscow Central Diameters which was opened on November 21, 2019.
