= Streshnevo railway station =

Railway station in Moscow, Russia

Streshnevo Стрешнево
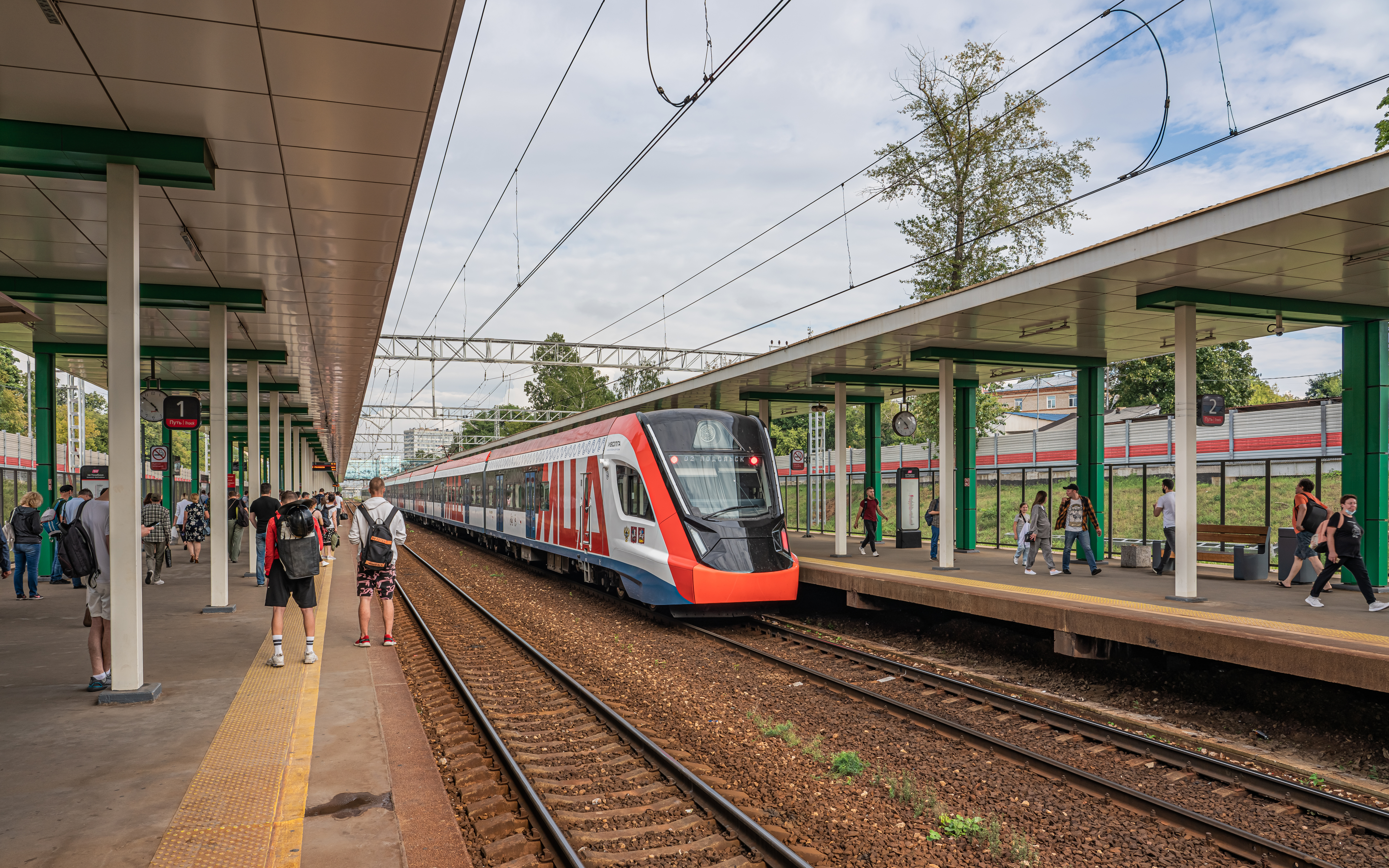

General information
- Location: Svetlyy Proyezd, 10 корпус 1, Moscow; Russia
- Coordinates: 55.8152°N 37.4904°E
- System: Moscow Railway platform
- Owner: Russian Railways
- Operator: Moscow Railway
- Platforms: 2 (Side platform)
- Tracks: 2

Construction
- Structure type: At-grade
- Parking: Yes

History
- Opened: 1964
- Rebuilt: 2018

Services
| Preceding station | Moscow Central Diameters | Following station |
|---|---|---|
| Shchukinskaya towards Nakhabino | Line D2 | Krasny Baltiyets towards Podolsk |
Route map
Location

Streshnevo is a railway station of Line D2 of the Moscow Central Diameters in Moscow. It was opened in 1964 and rebuilt in 2018.

== Gallery ==
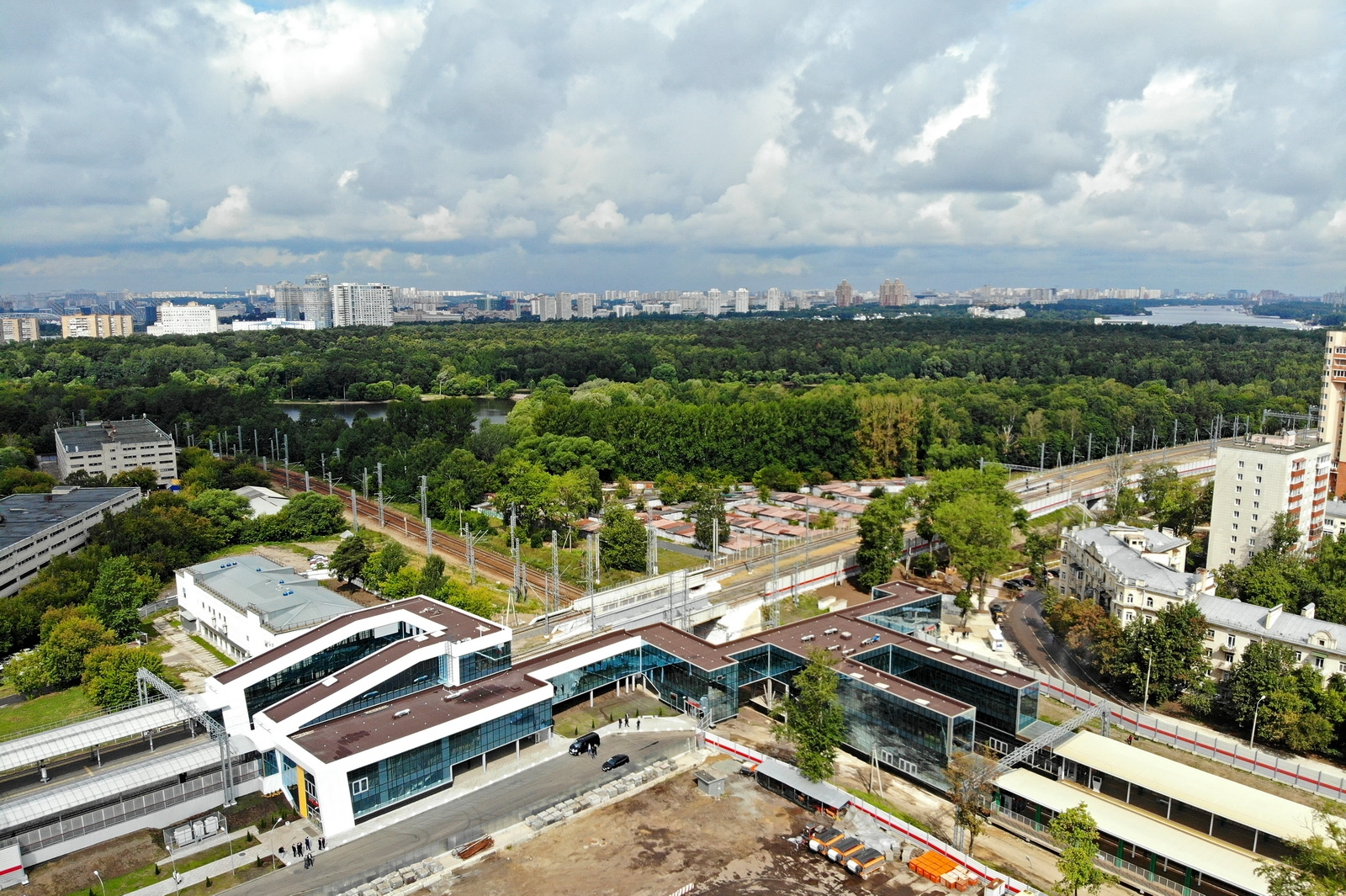
Transfer terminal leading to Streshnevo metro station of the Moscow Central Circle line.

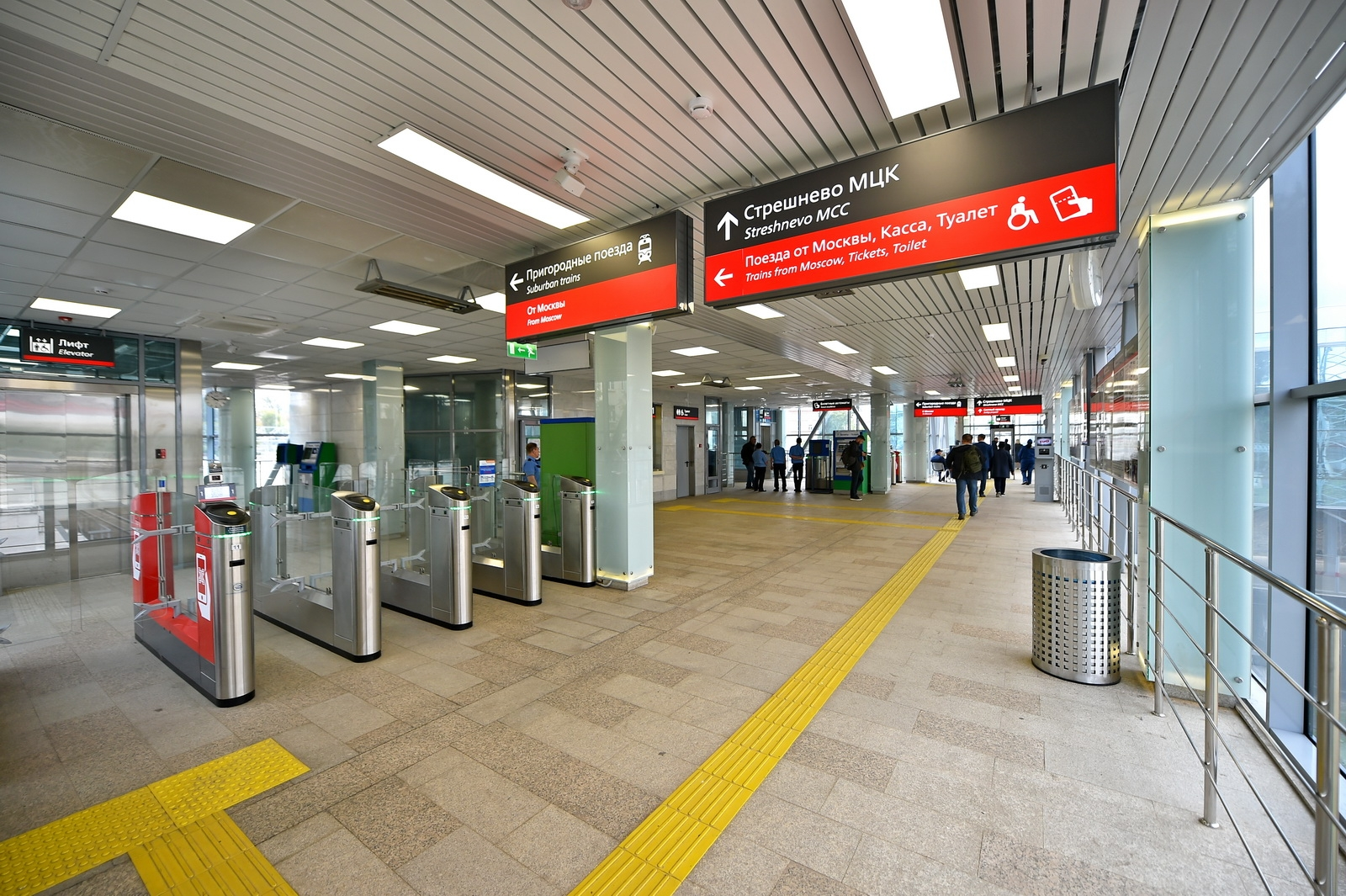
Interior of the transfer terminal.

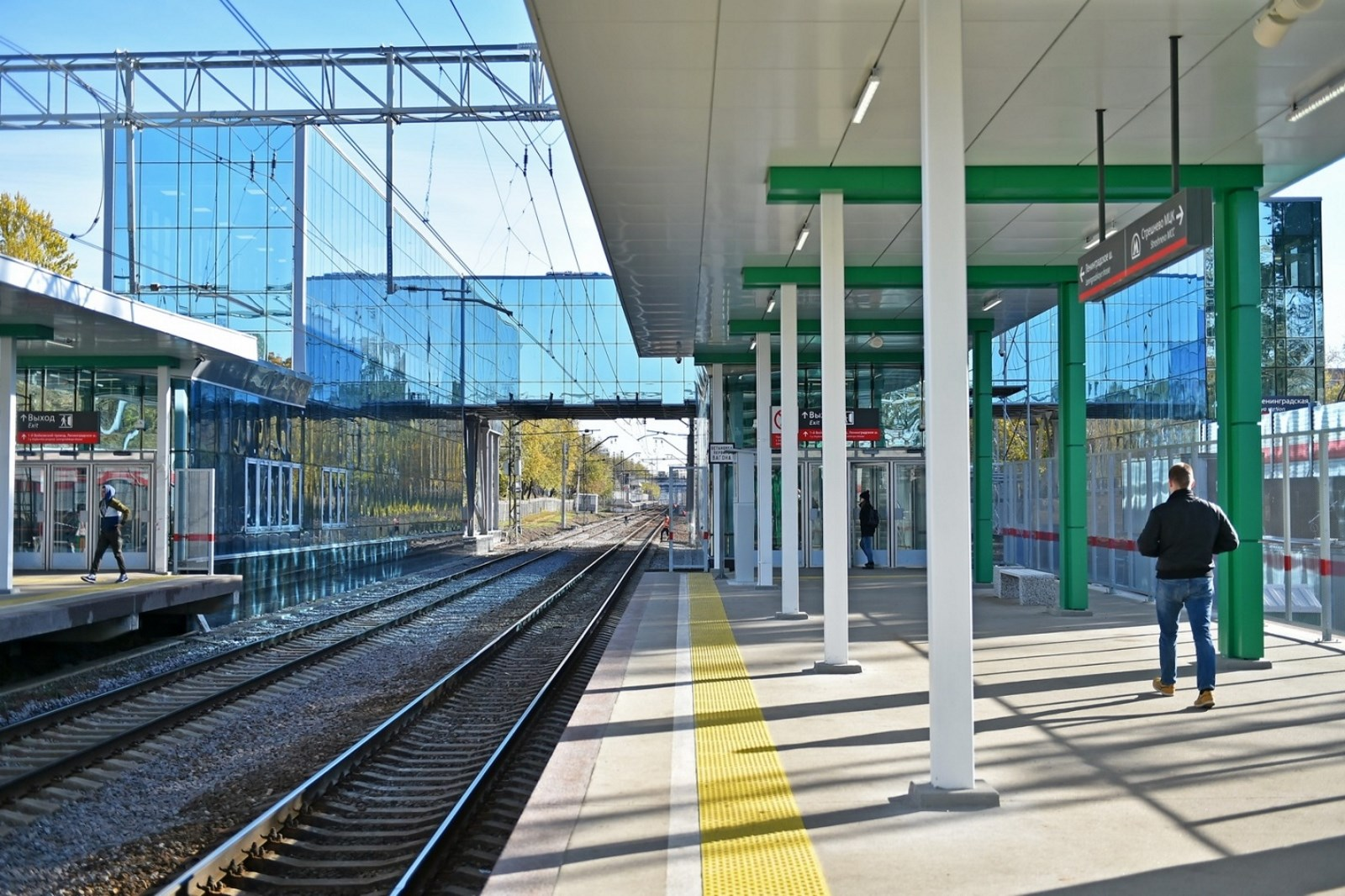
