= Opalikha railway station =

Railway station in Moscow Oblast, Russia

Opalikha Опалиха
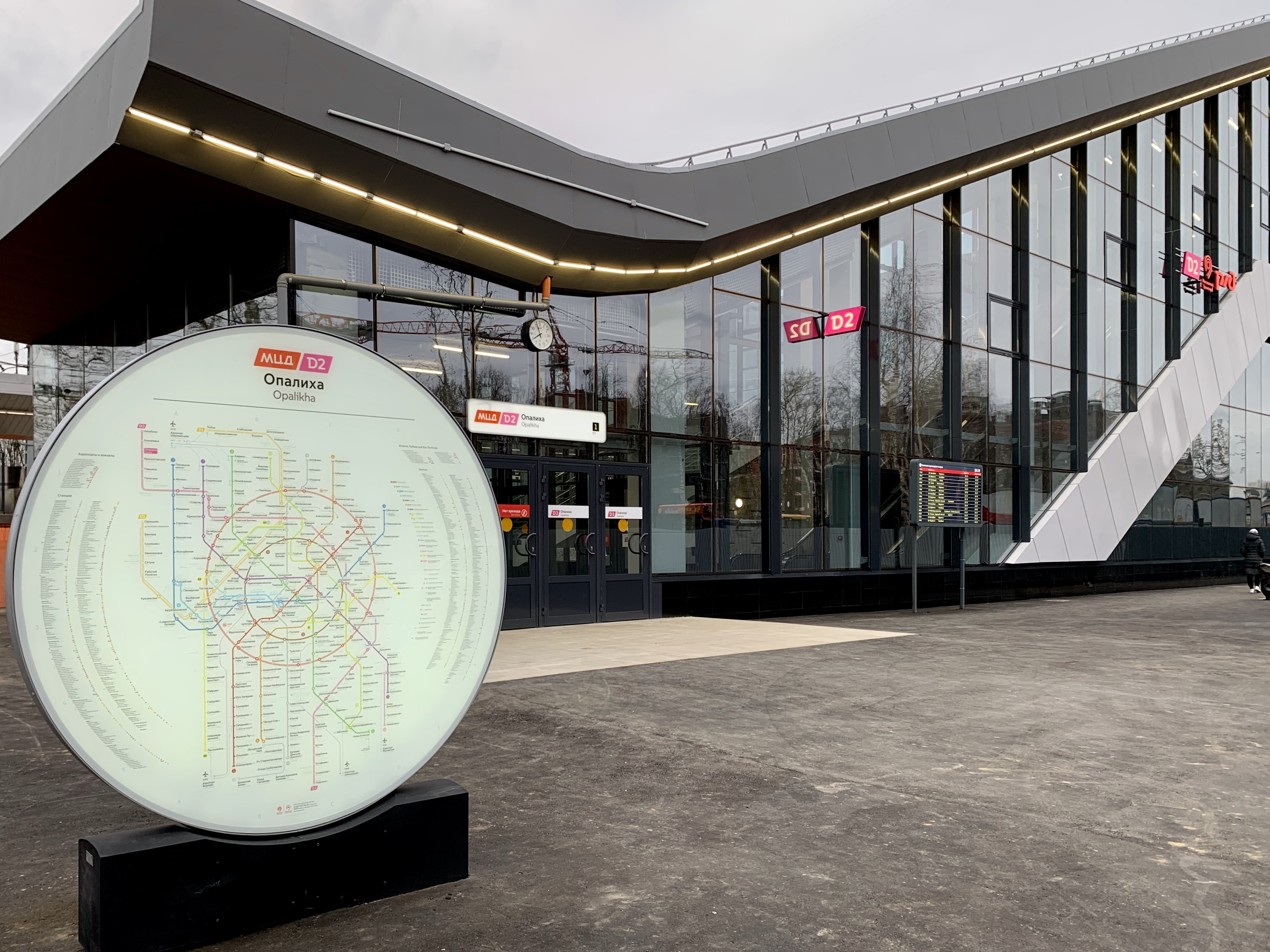

General information
- Location: Krasnogorsk; Russia
- Coordinates: 55.8229°N 37.2482°E
- System: Moscow Railway platform
- Owner: Russian Railways
- Operator: Moscow Railway

History
- Opened: 1901
- Rebuilt: 2020

Services
Preceding station	Moscow Central Diameters	Following station
Anikeyevka towards Nakhabino	Line D2	Krasnogorskaya towards Podolsk
Route map
Location

Opalikha is a railway station of Line D2 of the Moscow Central Diameters in Krasnogorsk, Moscow Oblast. It was opened in 1901 and rebuilt in 2020.

== Gallery ==
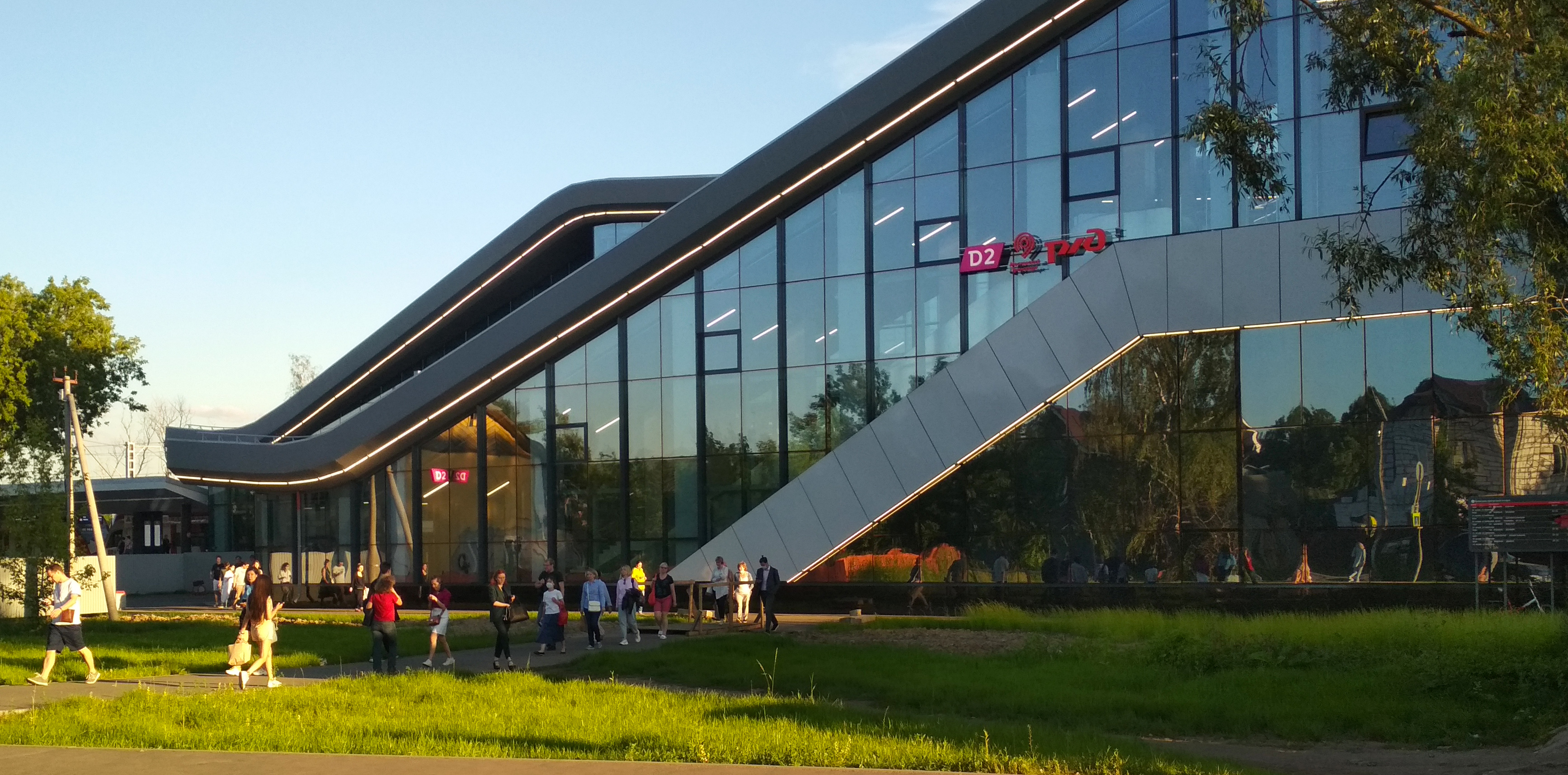
The railway station in 2020.

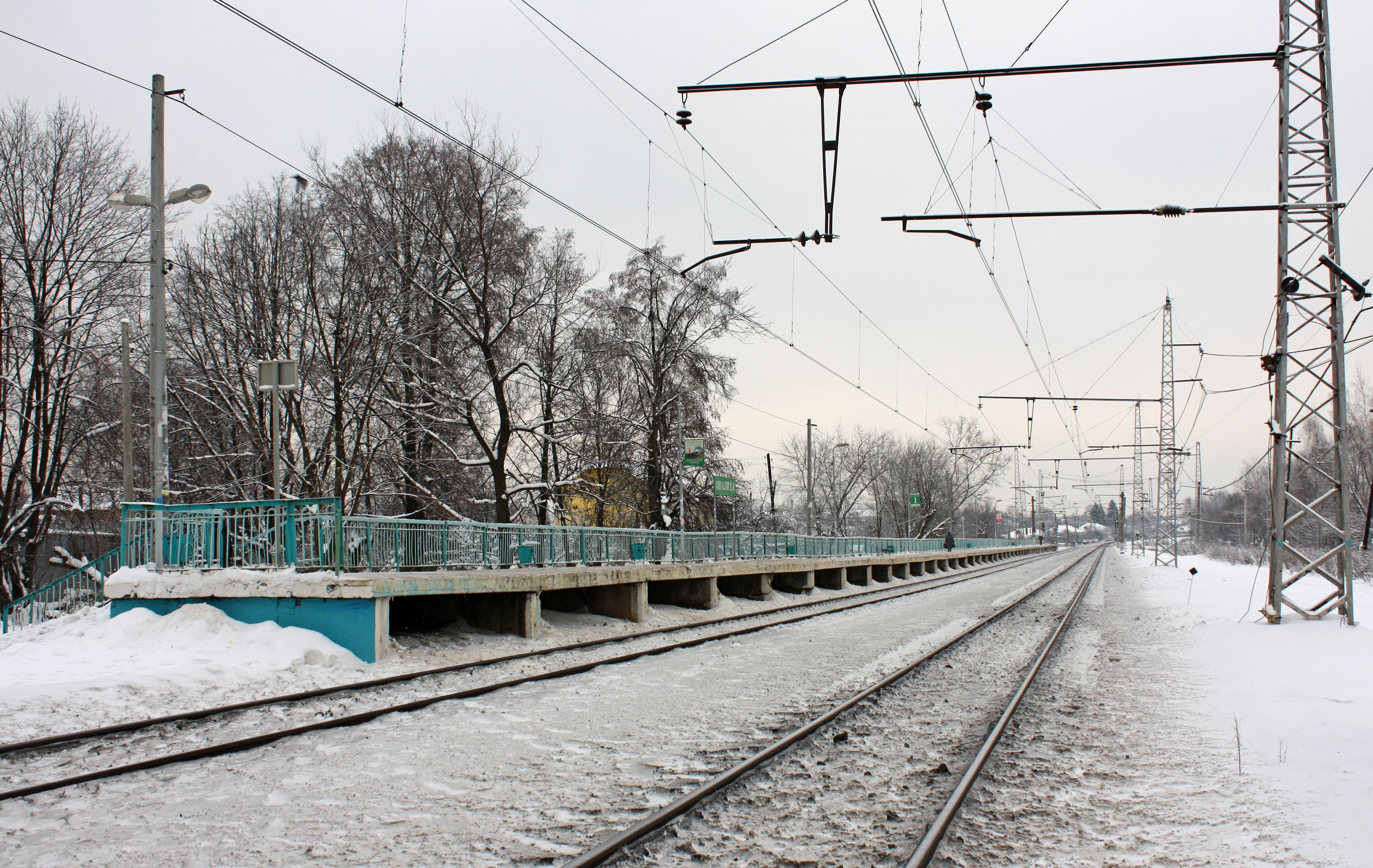
Opalikha railway station in 2010, long before reconstruction.
