= Streshnevo =

Streshnevo may refer to:

- Streshnevo (Moscow Central Circle), a railway station on the Moscow Central Circle
- Streshnevo railway station, a railway station on the Moscow Central Diameters
