= Krasny Baltiyets railway station =

Railway station in Moscow, Russia

Coordinates: 55.8155°N 37.5261°E

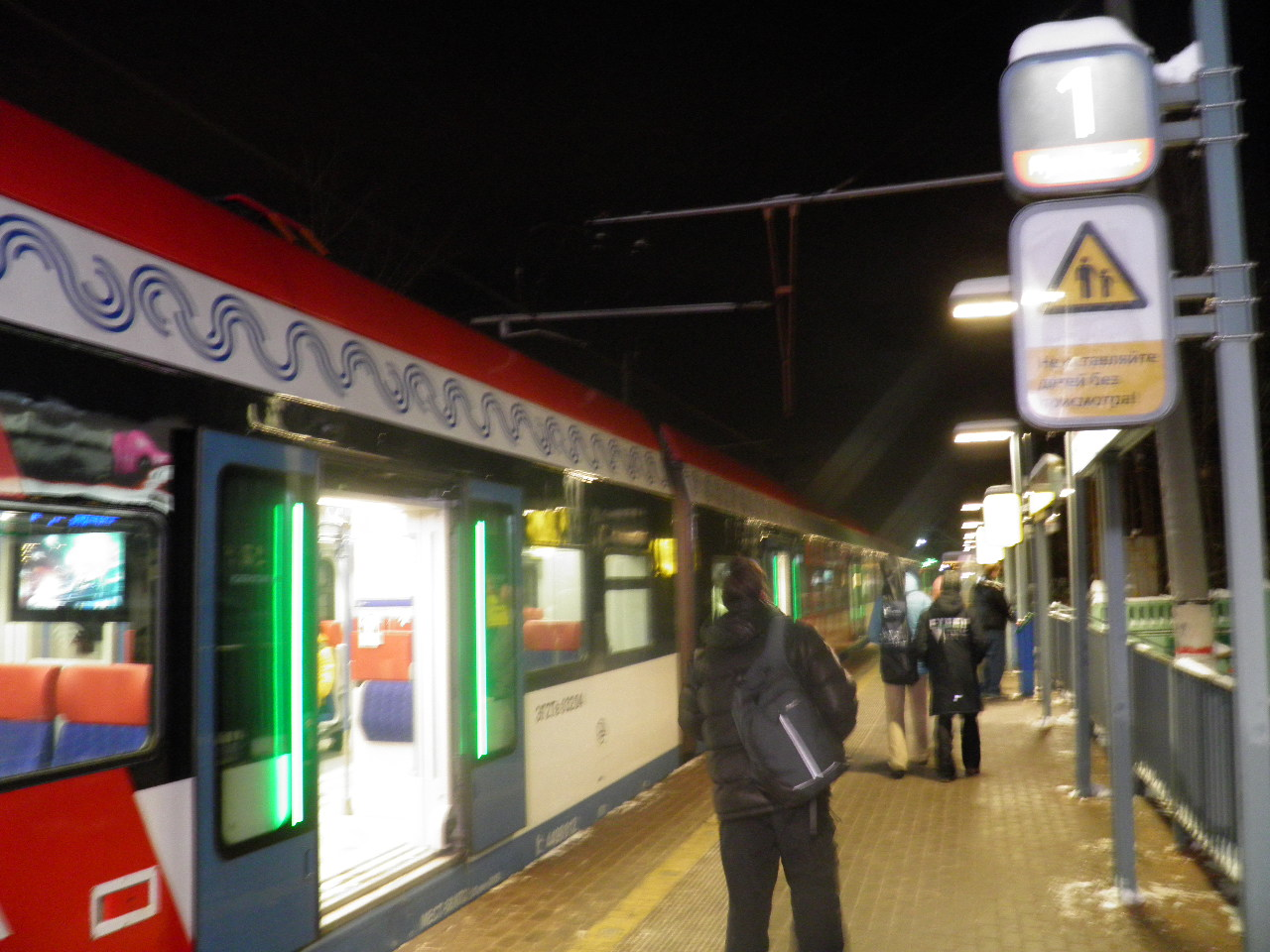
Krasny Baltiets Station

Krasny Baltiyets (Russian: Красный балтиец) is a light rail station of the high-speed rail transport system of the Moscow Central Diameters, located in Moscow on the border of the Koptevo, Aeroport, Sokol and Voikovsky districts. The commute time to Dmitrovskaya MCD2 station is 6 minutes and 2 minutes to Streshnevo MCC station.

The station was named after a railroad workers' community centre 'Red Baltic Seaman' built in Bauhaus style in 1928-1930 in the vicinity of this Baltic sea bound railway line first opened in 1901.
