= Line D2 (Moscow Central Diameters) =

Suburban rail line in Moscow

Kursko-Rizhsky Diameter

Overview
- Native name: Курско–Рижский диаметр
- Status: Operational
- Owner: Government of Russia
- Locale: Moscow
- Termini: Nakhabino; Podolsk
- Stations: 35

Service
- Type: Commuter rail
- System: Moscow Central Diameters
- Operator: Central Suburban Passenger Company
- Rolling stock: EG2Tv

History
- Opened: 29 November 2019

Technical
- Line length: 80 km (50 mi)
- Track gauge: 1,520 mm (4 ft 11 27/32 in) Russian gauge
- Electrification: 3 kV DC overhead catenary

D2 (Russian: МЦД-2) or Kursko-Rizhsky Diameter (Russian: Курско–Рижский диаметр) (Diameter 2; Pink Diameter)is the second of the Moscow Central Diameters, a suburban network in Moscow which uses the existing infrastructure of Moscow Railway and provides a regular connection between Moscow and surrounding cities. MCD-2 runs from Nakhabino via Krasnogorsk and Moscow to Podolsk.

The line was opened on 21 November 2019, at the same day as D1. It uses the tracks and the stations of the Rizhsky and the Kursky suburban railway line. The length of the line is 80 kilometres (50 mi), and the travel time between the termini is 116 minutes. These suburban railway lines have been connected earlier, and through suburban trains were running between them, therefore the initial investment to open the line was minimum.

Modified Ivolga trains have been serving the line since its opening.

== Stations ==
The stations between Volokolamskaya and Ostafyevo are in Moscow, others are in Moscow Oblast.

Moskva Tovarnaya is set to close.

Station Name		Transfers
English	Russian	Transfers
Nakhabino	Нахабино	
Anikeyevka	Аникеевка	
Opalikha	Опалиха	
Krasnogorskaya	Красногорская	
Pavshino	Павшино	
Penyagino	Пенягино	
Volokolamskaya	Волоколамская	Volokolamskaya
Trikotazhnaya	Трикотажная	
Tushinskaya	Тушинская	Tushinskaya
Shchukinskaya	Щукинская	Shchukinskaya
Streshnevo	Стрешнево	Streshnevo
Krasny Baltiets	Красный Балтиец	
Grazhdanskaya	Гражданская	
Savyolovskaya	Савёловская	Savyolovskaya Savyolovskaya Savyolovskaya Savyolovskaya
Dmitrovskaya	Дмитровская	Dmitrovskaya; Dmitrovskaya
Maryina Roshcha	Марьина Роща	Maryina Roshcha; Maryina Roshcha; Maryina Roshcha
Rizhskaya	Рижская	Rizhskaya; Rizhskaya; Rizhskaya
Ploschad Tryokh Vokzalov	Площадь трёх вокзалов	Ploschad Tryokh Vokzalov; Komsomolskaya; Komsomolskaya
Kurskaya	Курская	Kurskaya; Kurskaya; Kurskaya; Chkalovskaya
Serp i Molot	Серп и Молот	Serp i Molot; Ploshchad Ilyicha; Rimskaya
Moskva Tovarnaya	Москва Товарная	
Kalitniki	Калитники	
Novokhokhlovskaya	Новохохловская	Novokhokhlovskaya
Tekstilshchiki	Текстильщики	Tekstilshchiki; Tekstilshchiki
Pechatniki	Печатники	Pechatniki; Pechatniki
Lyublino	Люблино	
Depo	Депо	
Pererva	Перерва	
Kuryanovo	Курьяново	
Moskvorechye	Москворечье	
Tsaritsyno	Царицыно	Tsaritsyno
Kotlyakovo	Котляково	Kotlyakovo; Gorodnya
Pokrovskoye	Покровское	
Krasny Stroitel	Красный Строитель	
Bittsa	Битца	
Butovo	Бутово	
Shcherbinka	Щербинка	
Ostafyevo	Остафьево	
Silikatnaya	Силикатная	
Podolsk	Подольск	
