= Dmitrovskaya railway station (Savyolovskoye line) =

Railway station in Moscow, Russia

Coordinates: 55°48′27″N 37°35′08″E

Dmitrovskaya Дмитровская

General information
- Location: Moscow; Russia
- System: Moscow Railway platform
- Owner: Russian Railways
- Operator: Moscow Railway
- Connections: Dmitrovskaya; Dmitrovskaya

Services
Preceding station	Moscow Central Diameters	Following station
Timiryazevskaya towards Odintsovo	Line D1	Moscow Savyolovskaya towards Lobnya
Route map
Location

Dmitrovskaya is a planned railway station of Line D1 of the Moscow Central Diameters in Moscow. It will be opened in 2024.
