= Dmitrovskaya (Moscow Metro) =

Moscow Metro station

Dmitrovskaya Дмитровская
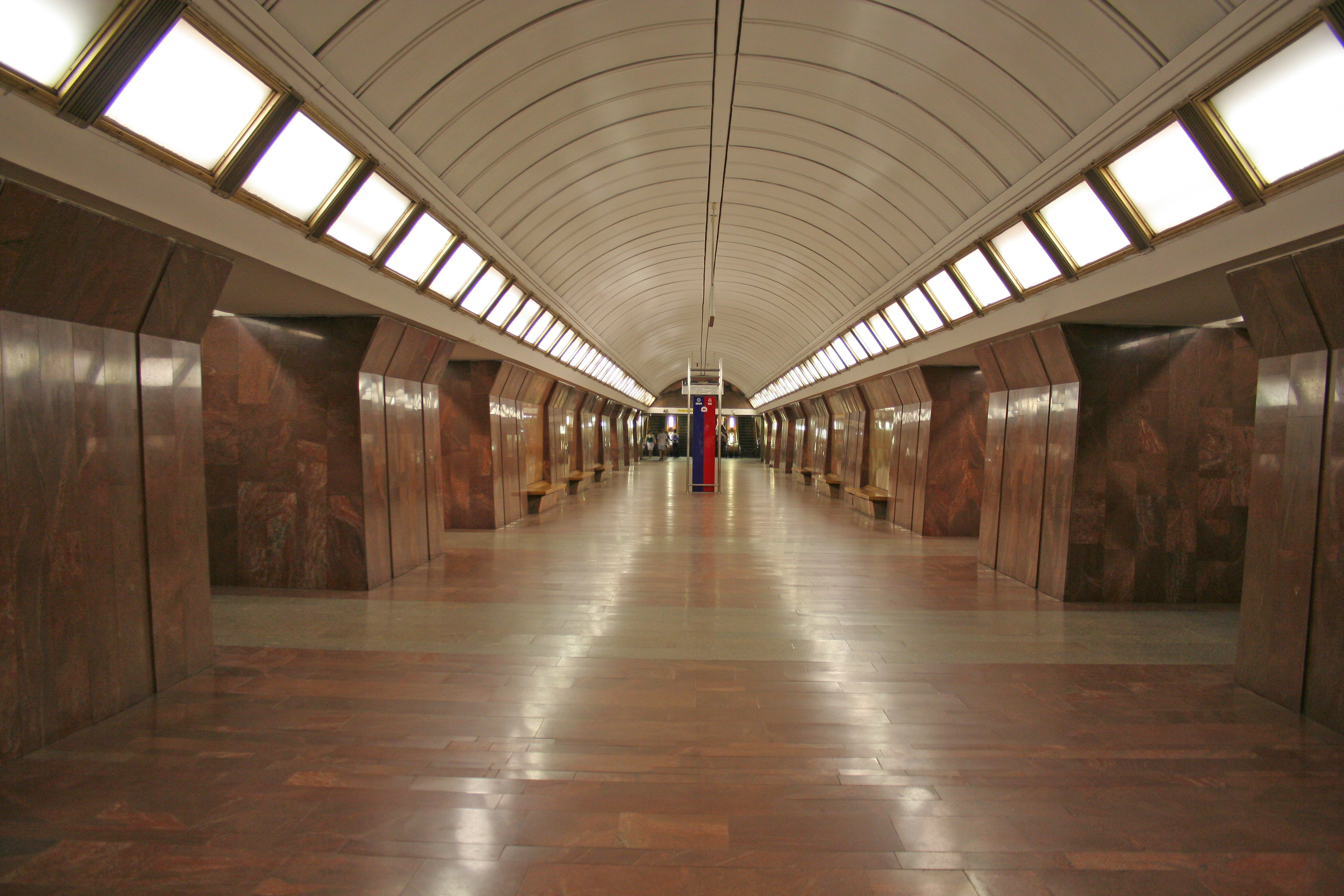

General information
- Location: Butyrsky District; Savyolovsky District; North-Eastern Administrative Okrug; Northern Administrative Okrug; Moscow; Russia
- Coordinates: 55.8069°N 37.5817°E
- System: Moscow Metro station
- Owner: Moskovsky Metropoliten
- Line: Serpukhovsko-Timiryazevskaya line
- Platforms: 1 island platform
- Tracks: 2

Construction
- Structure type: pylon tri-vault
- Depth: 59 metres (194 ft)
- Platform levels: 1
- Parking: No

Other information
- Station code: 135

History
- Opened: 1 March 1991; 35 years ago

Services
Preceding station	Moscow Metro	Following station
Timiryazevskaya towards Altufyevo	Serpukhovsko-Timiryazevskaya line	Savyolovskaya towards Bulvar Dmitriya Donskogo
Route map
Location
- Location within Moscow Metro

Dmitrovskaya (Russian: Дмитровская) is a station of the Serpukhovsko-Timiryazevskaya Line of the Moscow Metro.

It was opened in 1991, and is named for the highway leading to the town of Dmitrov.

== Description ==
The station was designed by Rimidalv Pogrebny and Vladimir Filippov (architect) in a pylon-trivault style. The white pylons are coated with red marble, while the side walls are decorated with its pink variety and plinth with brown. The floor is layered out with pink-grey granite and red marble. The back wall, as well as the arch above the escalator, feature metal bas-reliefs dedicated to the 1941 Battle of Moscow, both sculpted by Fyodor Fiveysky.

The station has one entrance, accessible from both sides of the Butyrskaya street. It is adjacent to the Dmitrovskaya railway station which serves the Rizhsky suburban railway line and Line D2 of Moscow Central Diameters.

== Gallery ==
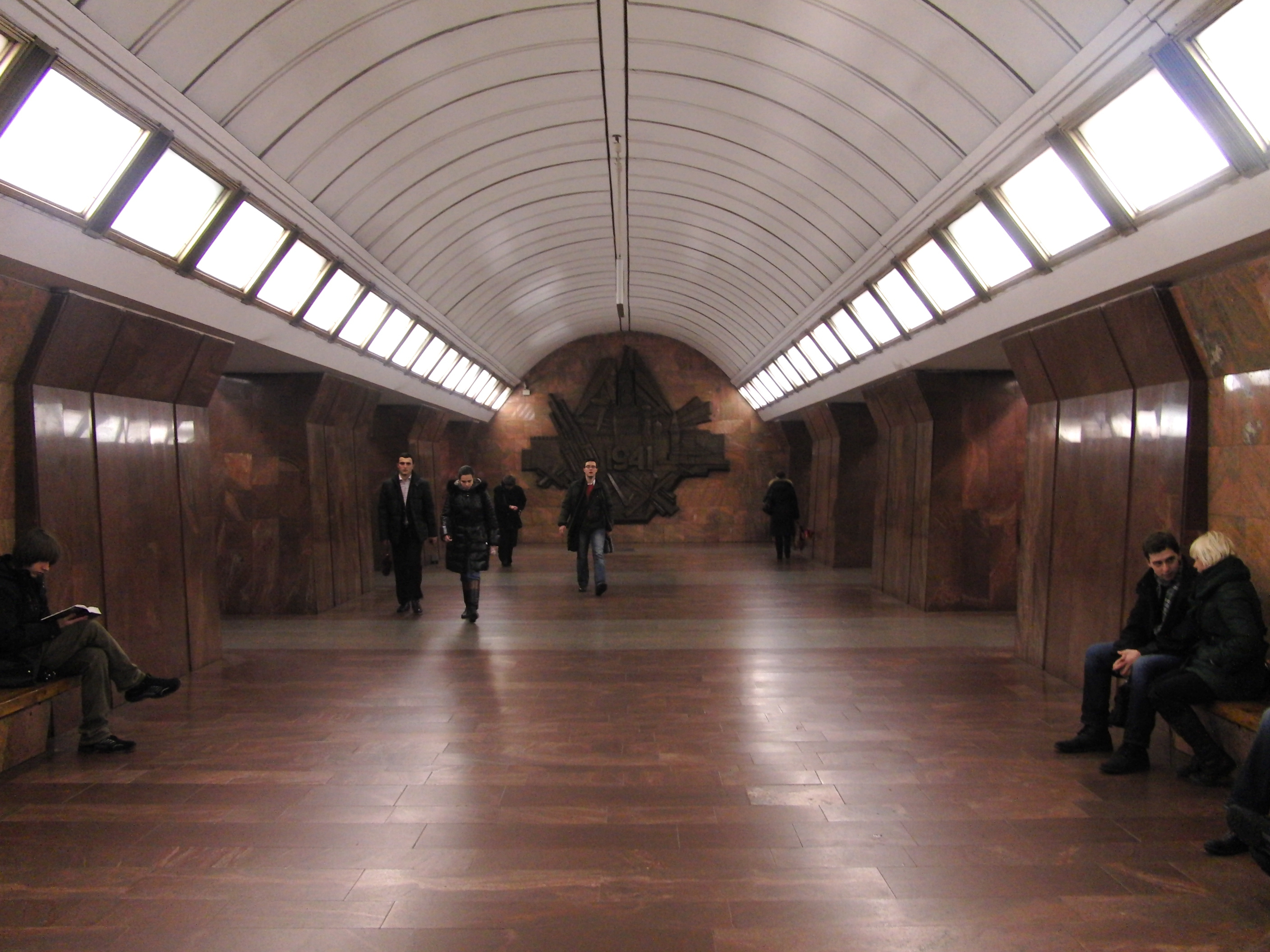

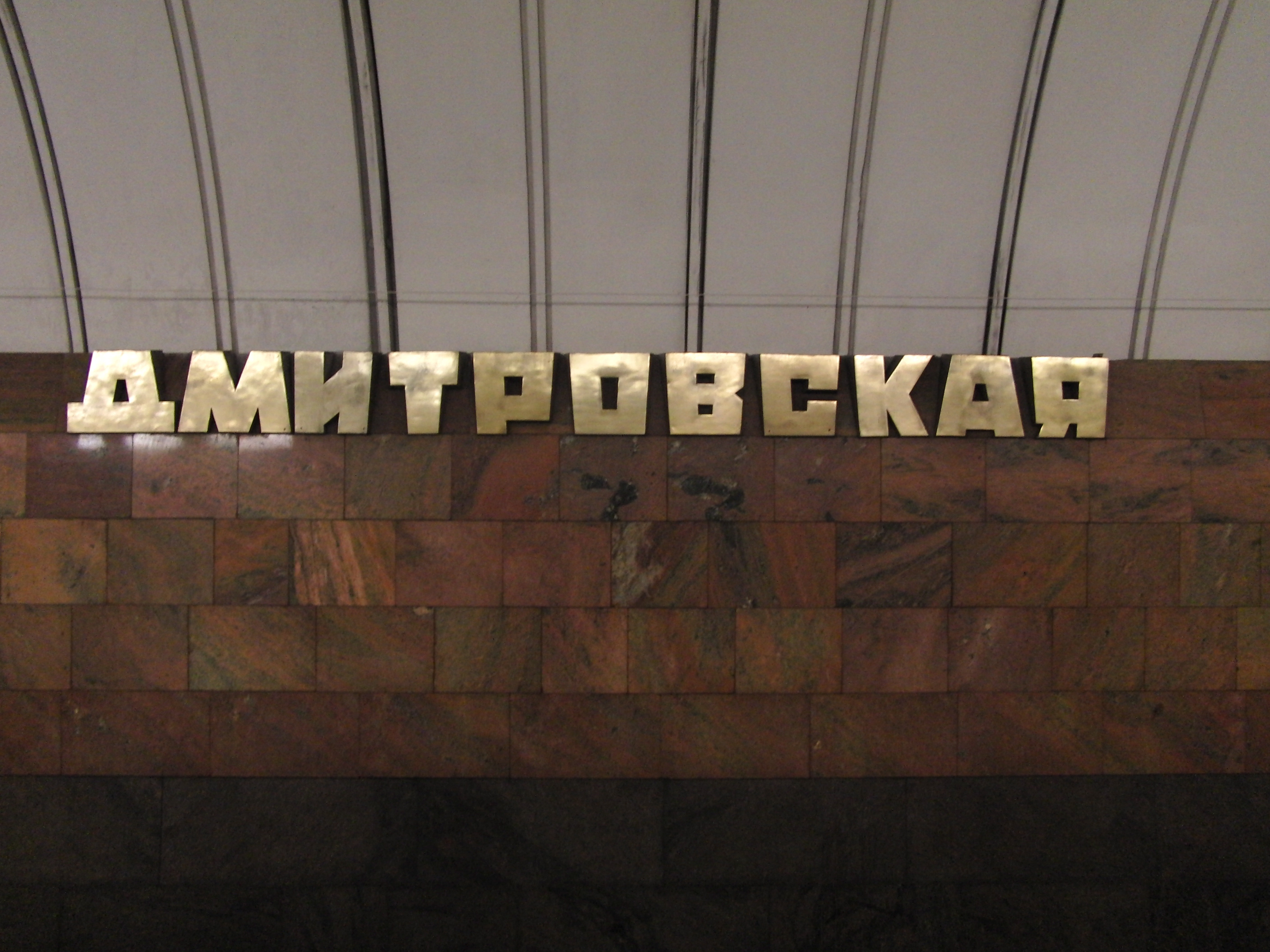

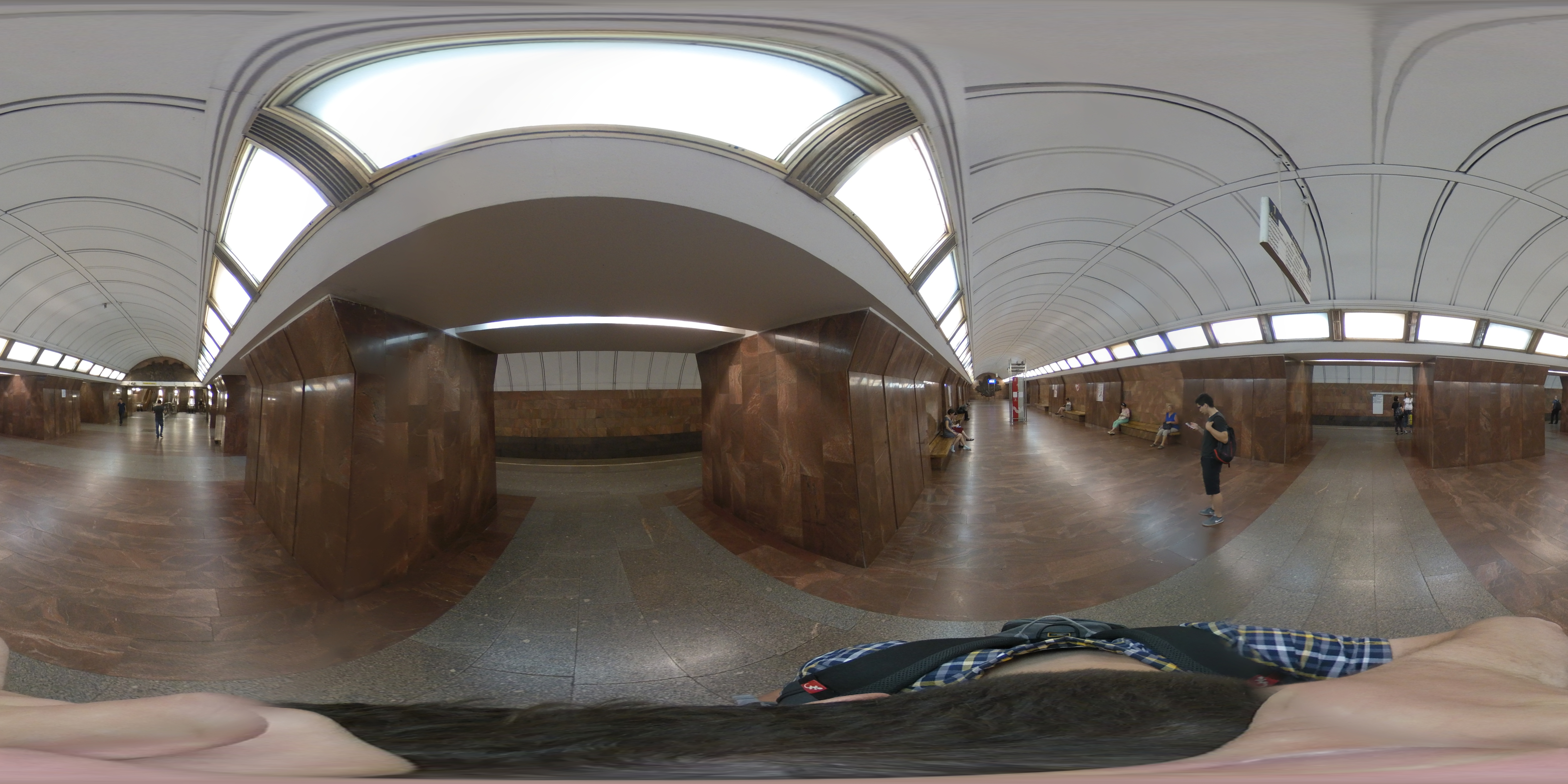
Main hall of Dmitrovskaya station (view as a 360° interactive panorama)
