= Podolsk railway station =

Railway station in Moscow Oblast, Russia

Podolsk Подольск
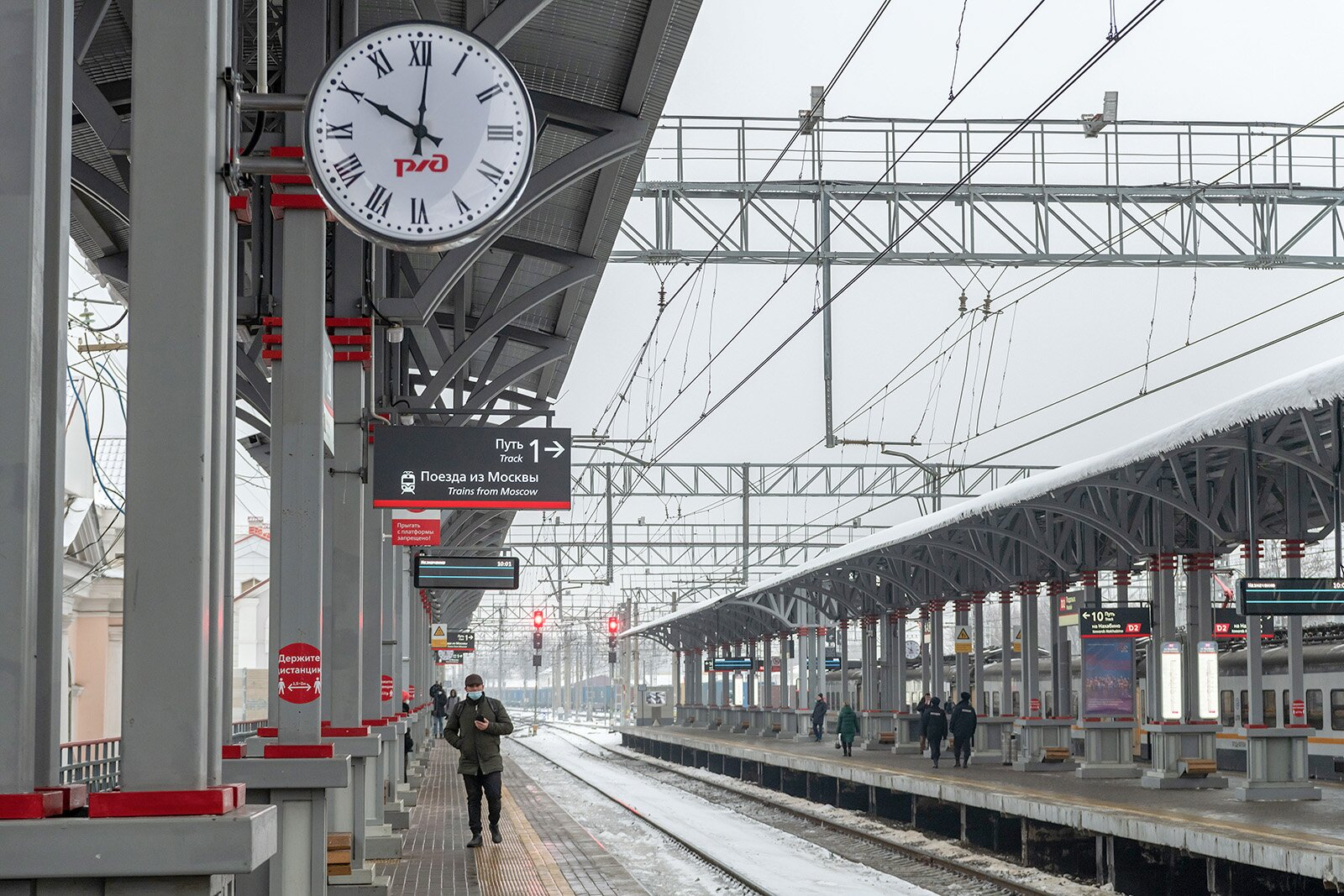

General information
- Location: Podolsk; Moscow Oblast; Russia
- Coordinates: 55.4317°N 37.5654°E
- System: Moscow Railway platform
- Owner: Russian Railways
- Operator: Moscow Railways

History
- Opened: 1865
- Rebuilt: 2020

Services
Preceding station	Moscow Railway (commuter service)	Following station
Silikatnaya towards Moscow Kursky	Kurskoye line	Kutuzovskaya towards Tula
Preceding station	Moscow Central Diameters	Following station
Silikatnaya towards Nakhabino	Line D2	Terminus
Location

Podolsk is a railway station of Line D2 of the Moscow Central Diameters in Moscow Oblast. It was opened in 1865 and rebuilt in 2020.

== Gallery ==
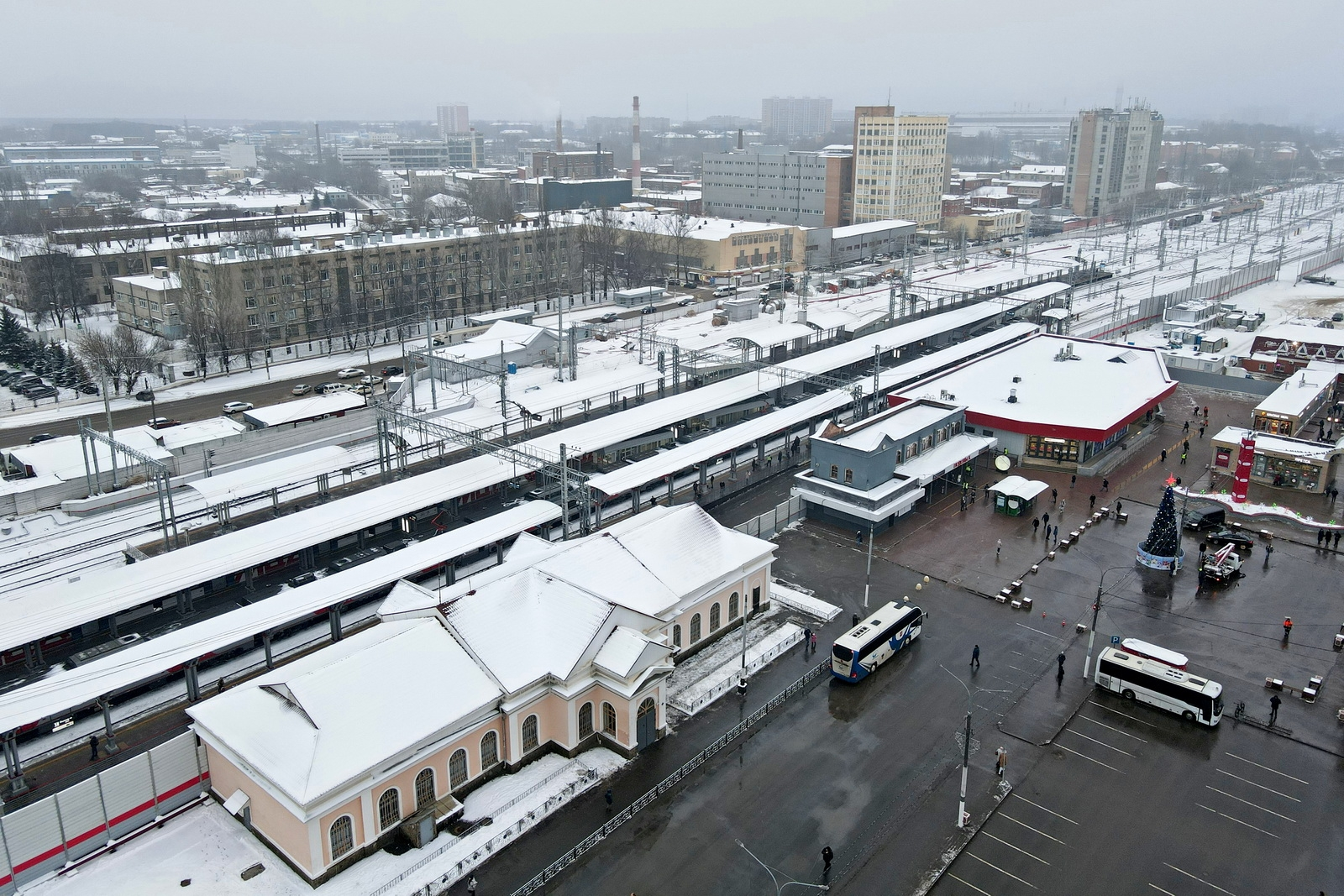
Reconstruction of the station was completed in 2020

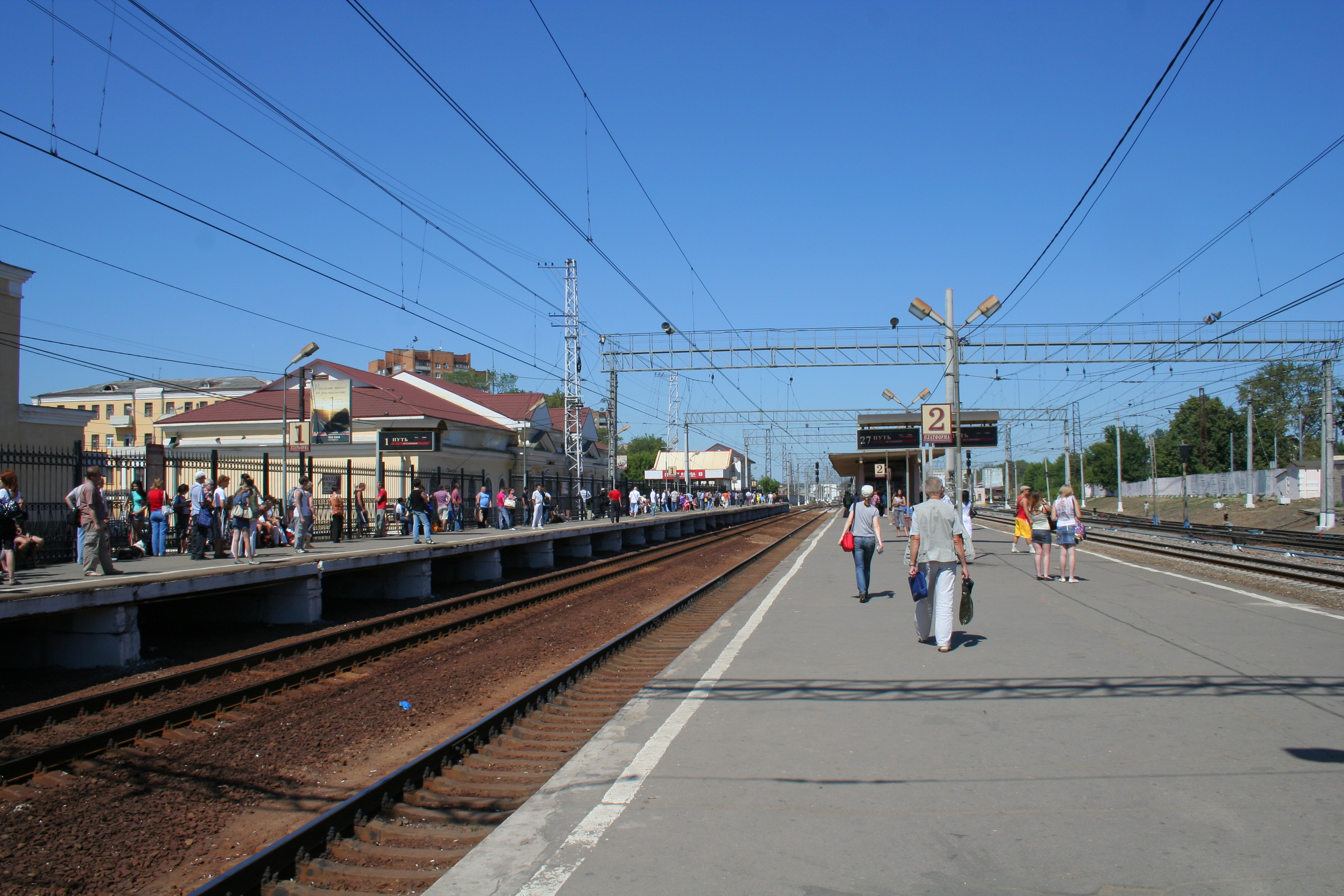
Podolsk railway station in 2010

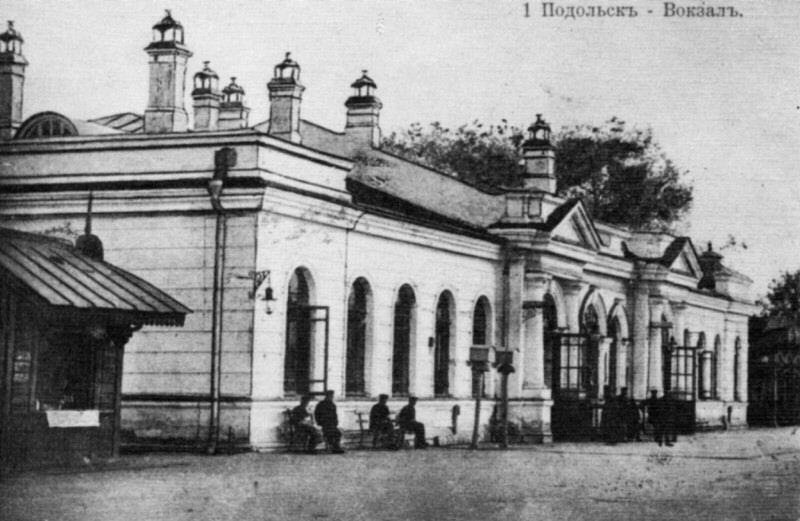
The station in 1889
