= Nakhabino railway station =

Railway station in Moscow Oblast, Russia

Nakhabino Нахабино
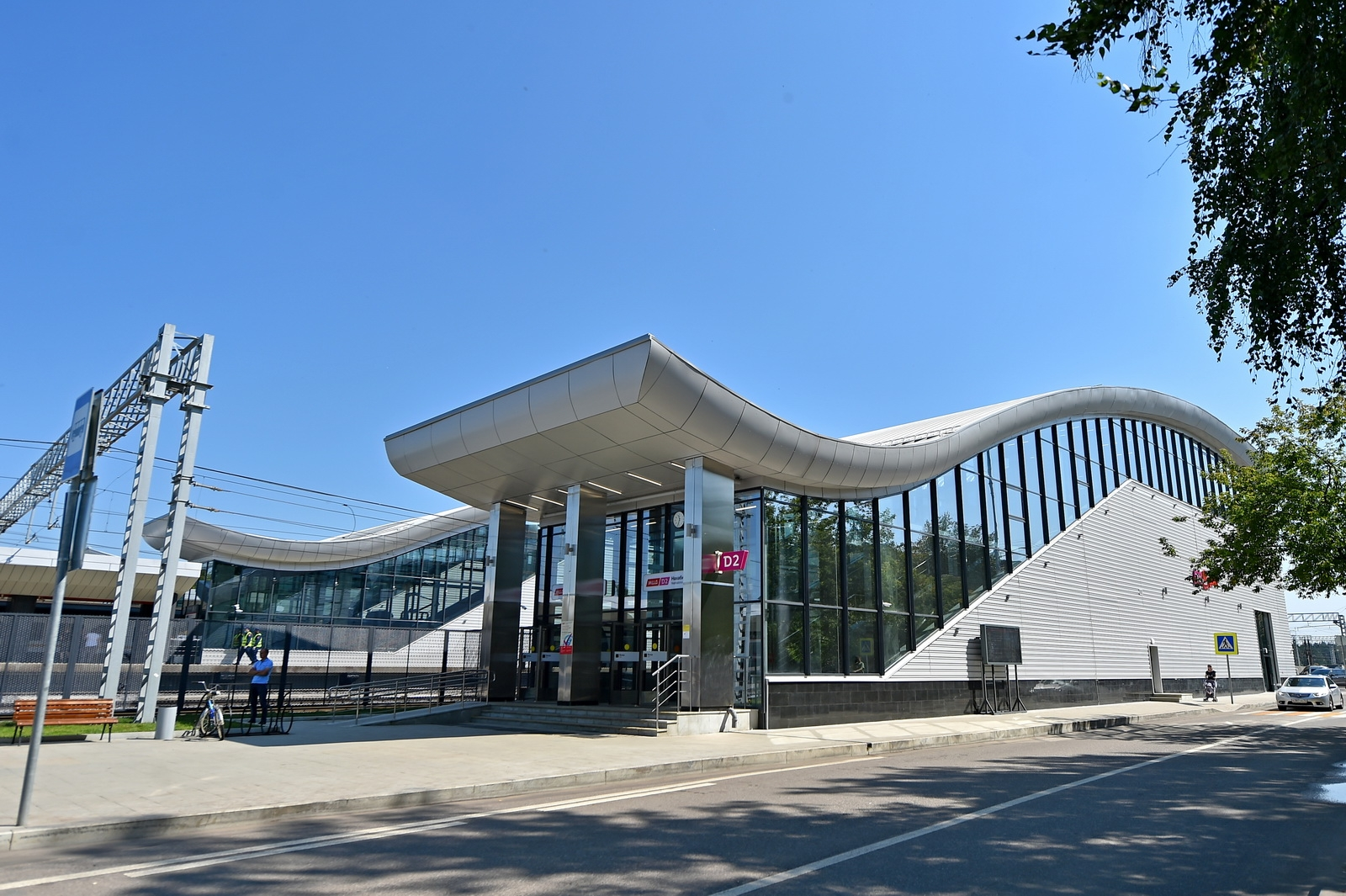

General information
- Location: Nakhabino; Moscow Oblast; Russia
- Coordinates: 55.8416°N 37.1849°E
- System: Moscow Railway platform
- Owner: Russian Railways
- Operator: Moscow Railways
- Platforms: 2
- Tracks: 6

Construction
- Structure type: At-grade

History
- Opened: 1901
- Rebuilt: 2020

Services
Preceding station	Moscow Central Diameters	Following station
Terminus	Line D2	Anikeyevka towards Podolsk
Location

Nakhabino is a railway station of Line D2 of the Moscow Central Diameters in Moscow Oblast. It was opened in 1901 and rebuilt in 2020.

== Gallery ==
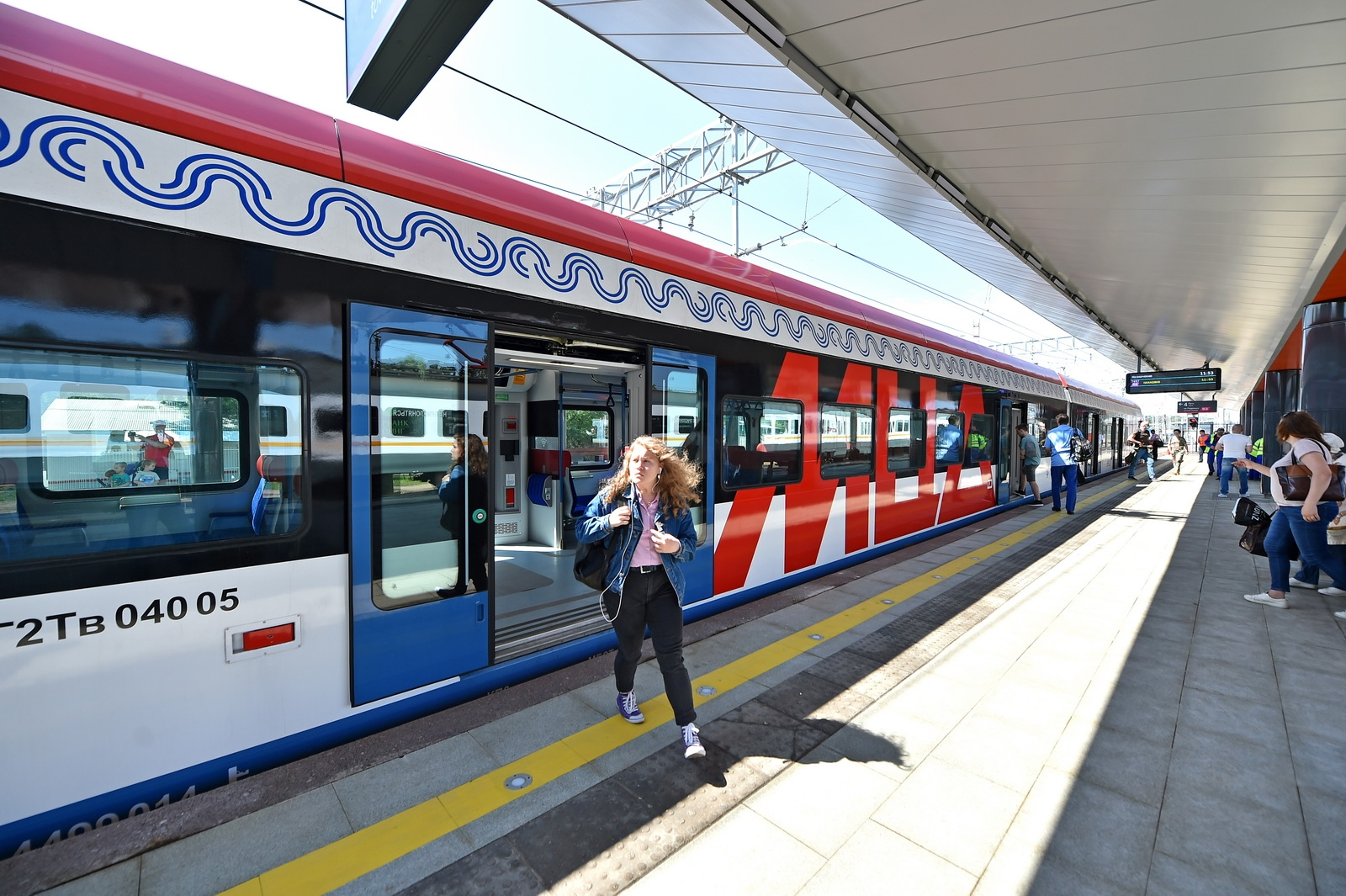

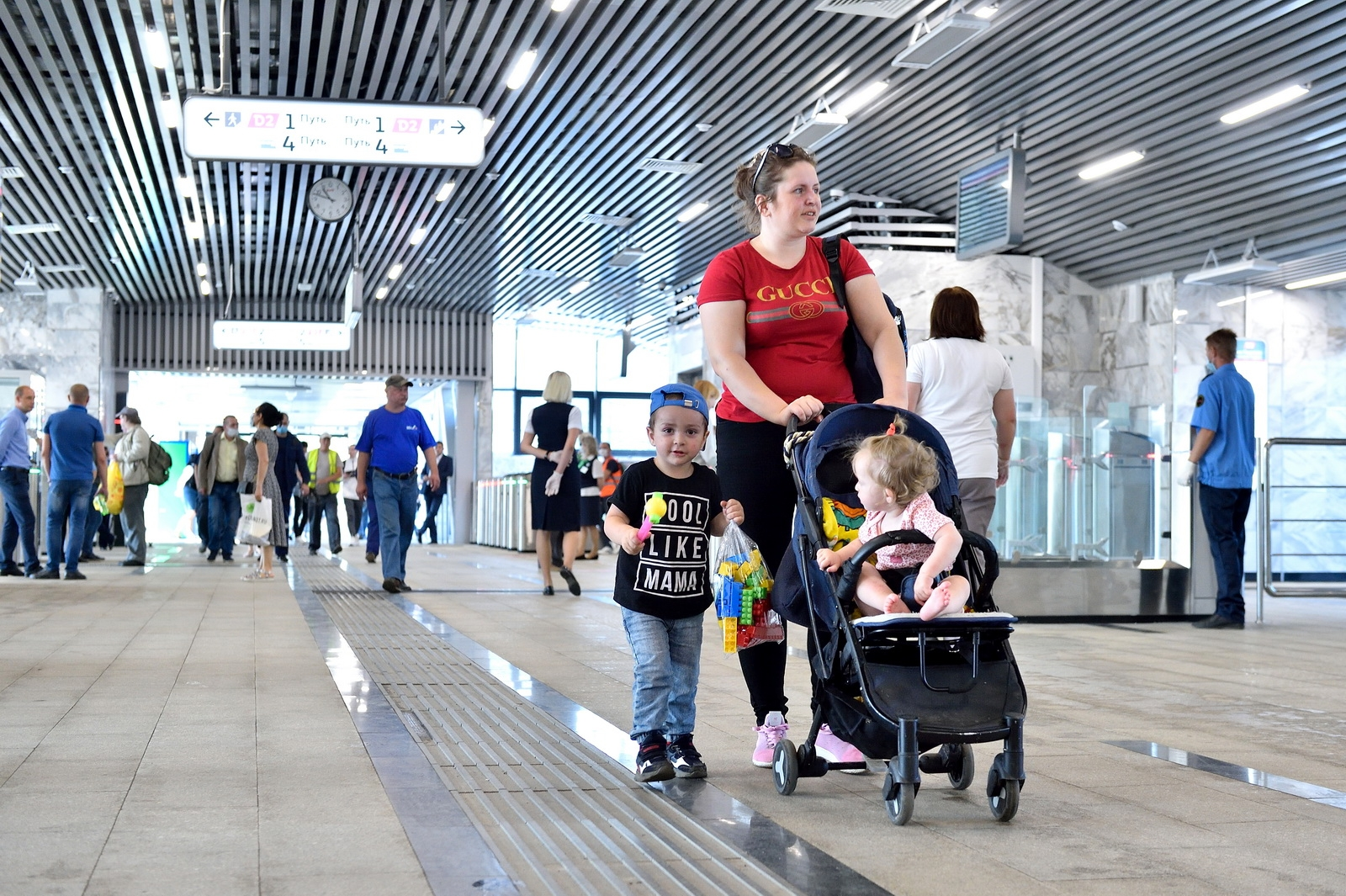

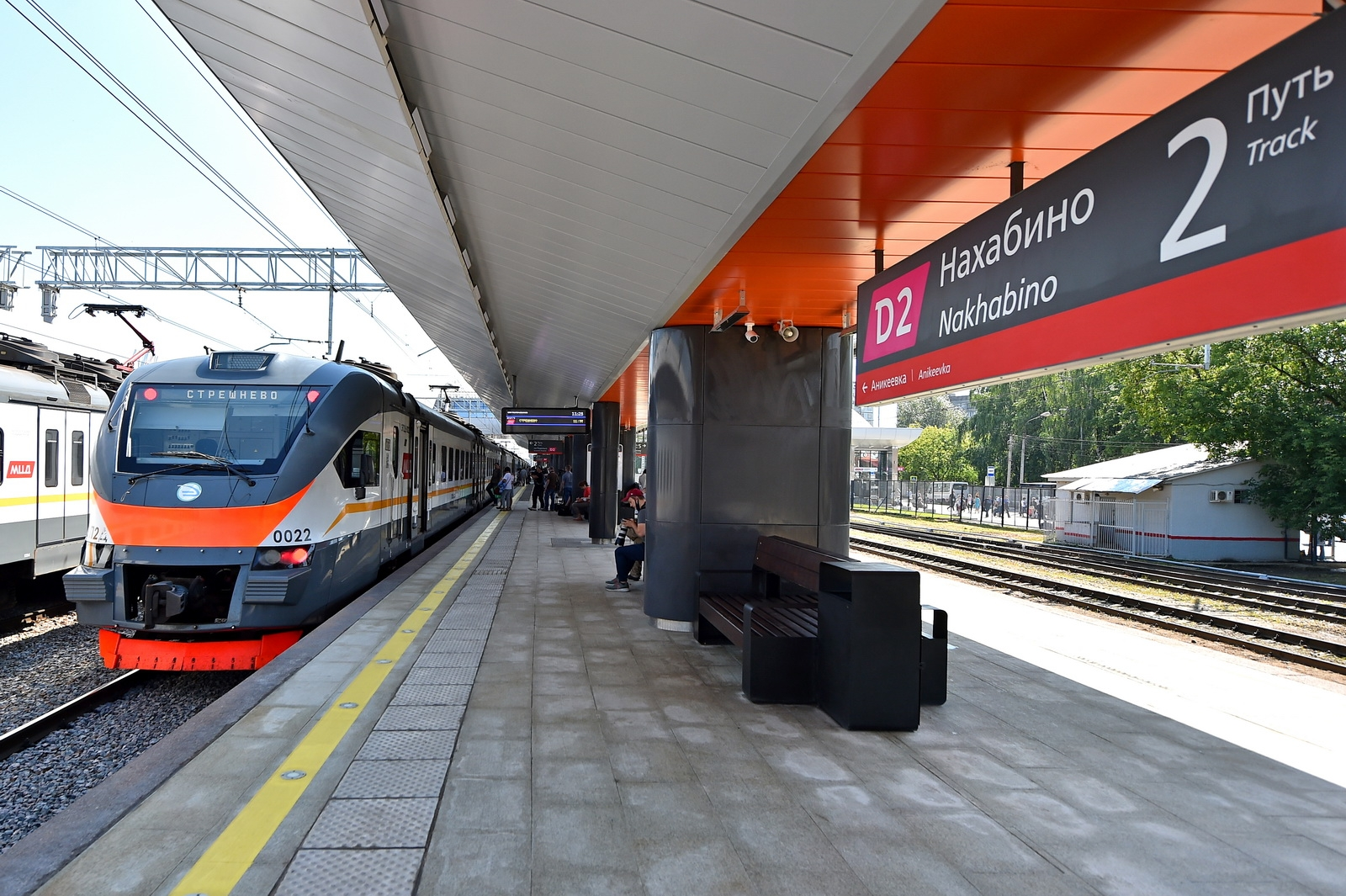

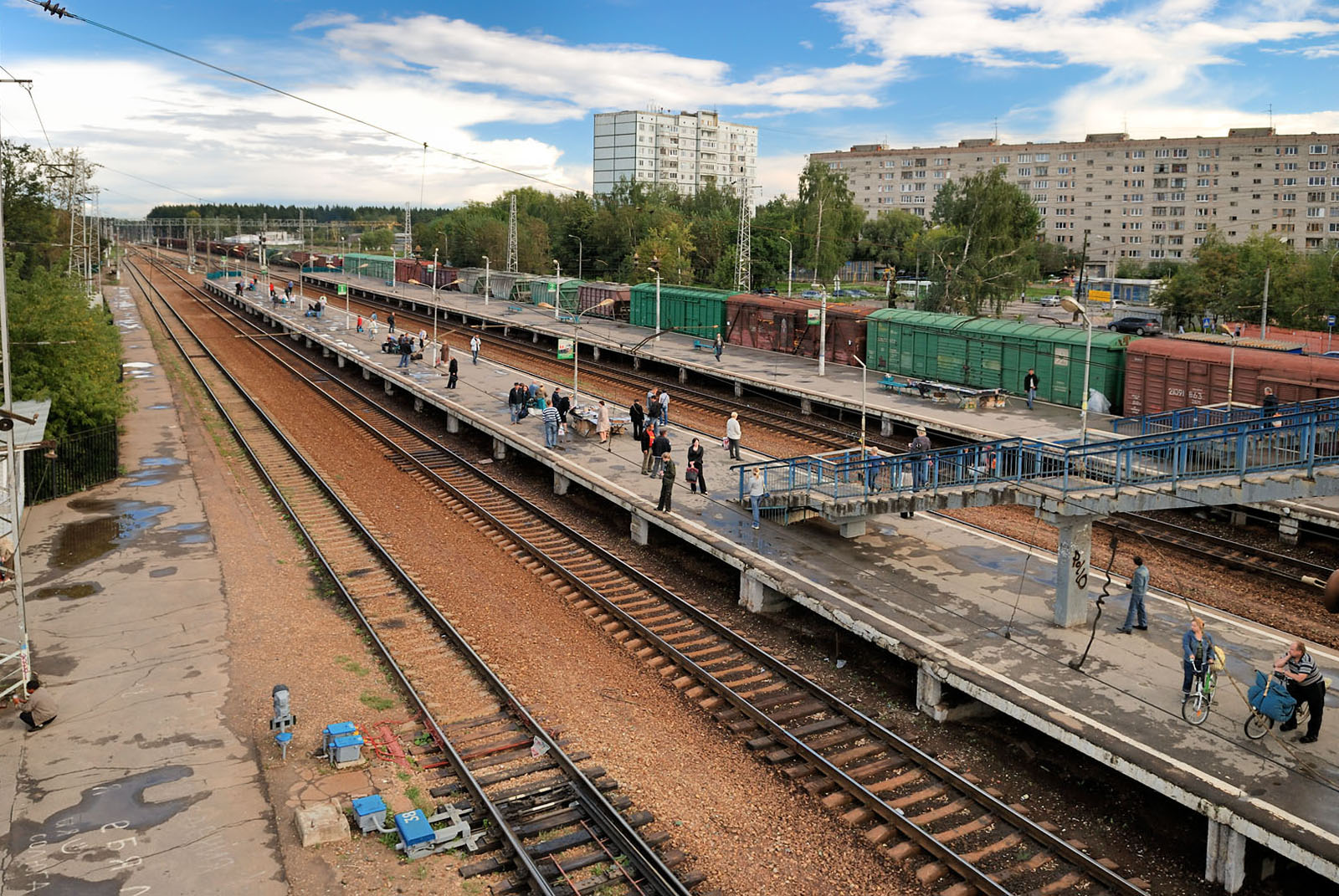
Nakhabino railway station in 2011, long before the reconstruction.
