= Streshnevo (Moscow Central Circle) =

Station on the Moscow Central Circle

Streshnevo Стрешнево
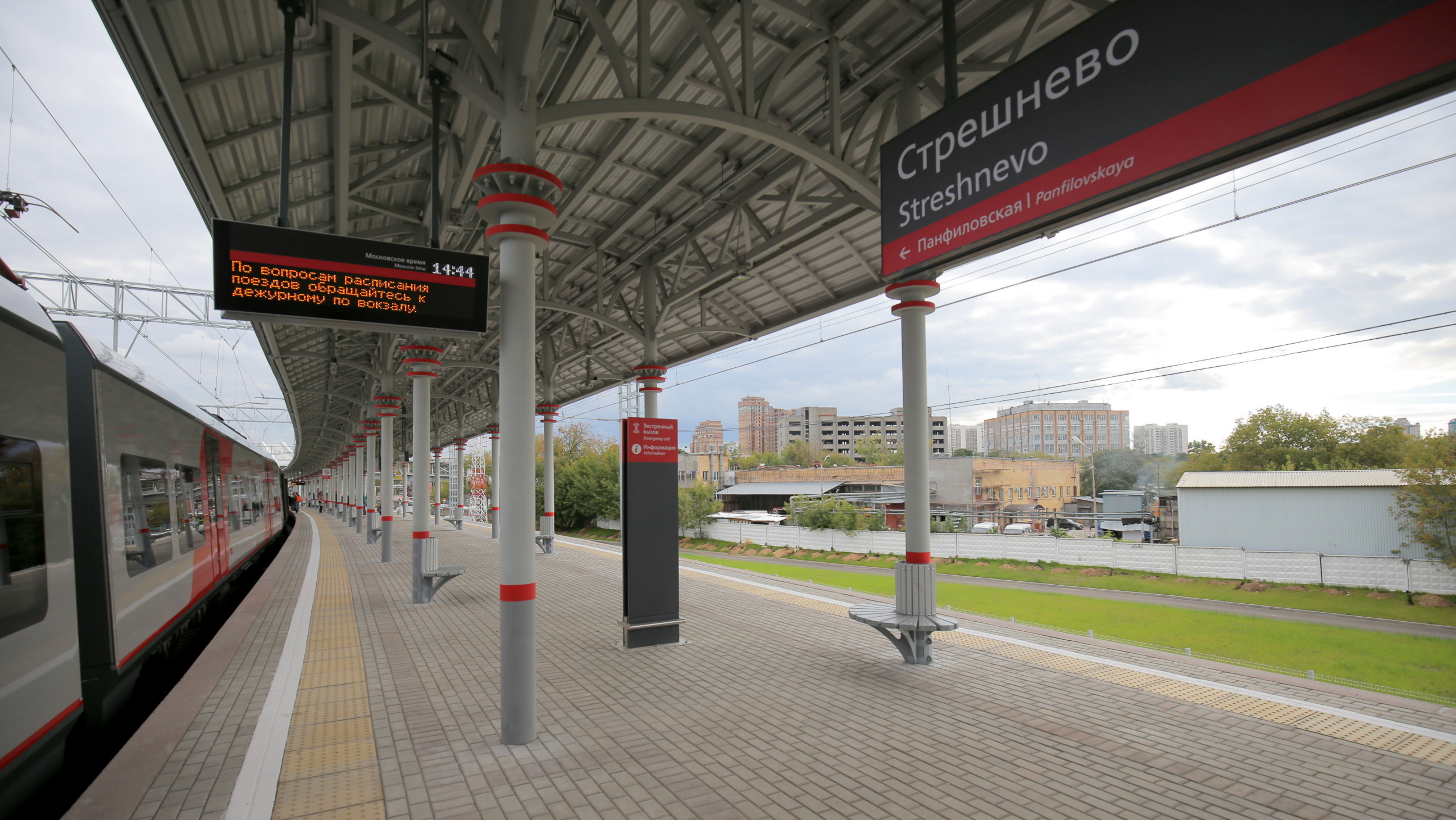

General information
- Coordinates: 55.8137°N 37.4870°E
- System: Moscow Metro
- Line: Moscow Central Circle
- Platforms: 2 side platforms
- Tracks: 3

History
- Opened: 10 September 2016; 9 years ago

Services
Preceding station	Moscow Metro	Following station
Panfilovskaya anticlockwise / outer	Moscow Central Circle	Baltiyskaya clockwise / inner
Route map
Location
- Location within Moscow Metro

Streshnevo (Russian: Стрешнево) is a station on the Moscow Central Circle of the Moscow Metro that opened in September 2016. The station is located on the border of the Sokol and Shchukino districts of Moscow; however the station's name comes from the adjacent Pokrovskoye-Streshnevo District. The original name was slated to be Volokolamskaya; but the city government agreed to change the name prior to the start of service.

There is a large gap between the platform and the cars at this station. In 2016, during a test run, one of the trains was scratched by the platform as it passed. Although the ED4 trains will not run on this line, the problem was corrected so that this does not become a problem with future trainsets.

== Transfers ==
There are transfer between Streshnevo MCC station and Streshnevo station of MCD-2 urban rail line. It was opened in 2019, few months before MCD opening.
