= Moscow Central Diameters =

Russian regional rail network

- Moscow Railway

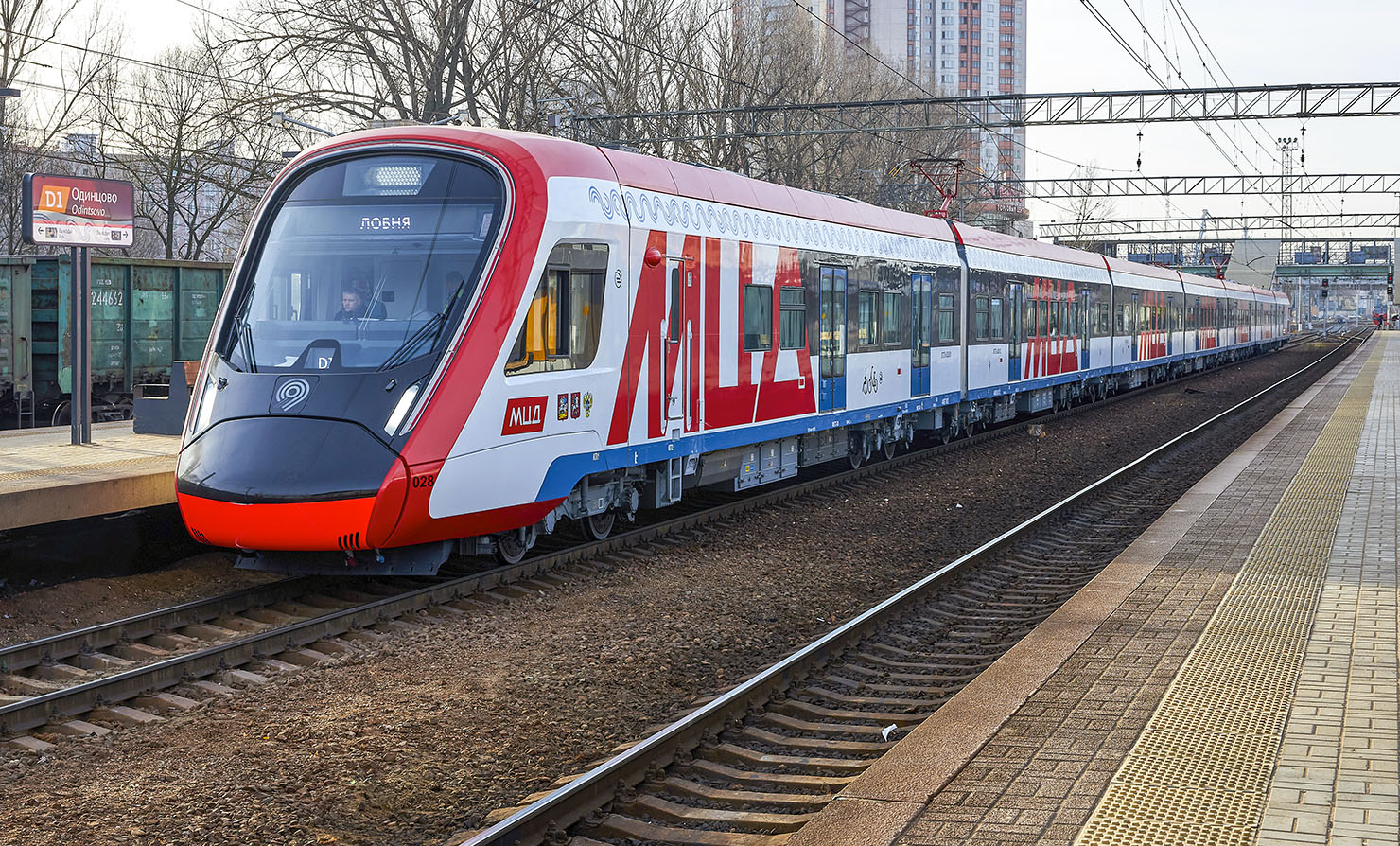
- Electric train EG2Tv "Ivolga" at Odintsovo railway station

Overview
- Native name: Московские центральные диаметры
- Area served: Moscow and Moscow Oblast
- Transit type: Hybrid urban-suburban rail
- Number of lines: 4 (5 planned)
- Number of stations: 137
- Daily ridership: 385,000 people
- Annual ridership: 360,000,000 people

Operation
- Began operation: 21 November 2019
- Operators: Russian Railways; CPSC
- Train length: "Ivolga", EP2DM, ED4M, ED4MKu: 11 cars EP2D: 9/11 cars ESh2: 6 cars ET2M: 12 cars ES2G "Lastochka": 10 cars

Technical
- System length: 303 kilometres (188 mi)
- Track gauge: 1,520 mm (4 ft 11 27/32 in) Russian gauge
- Top speed: 120 kilometres per hour (75 mph)
MCD Map including all lines
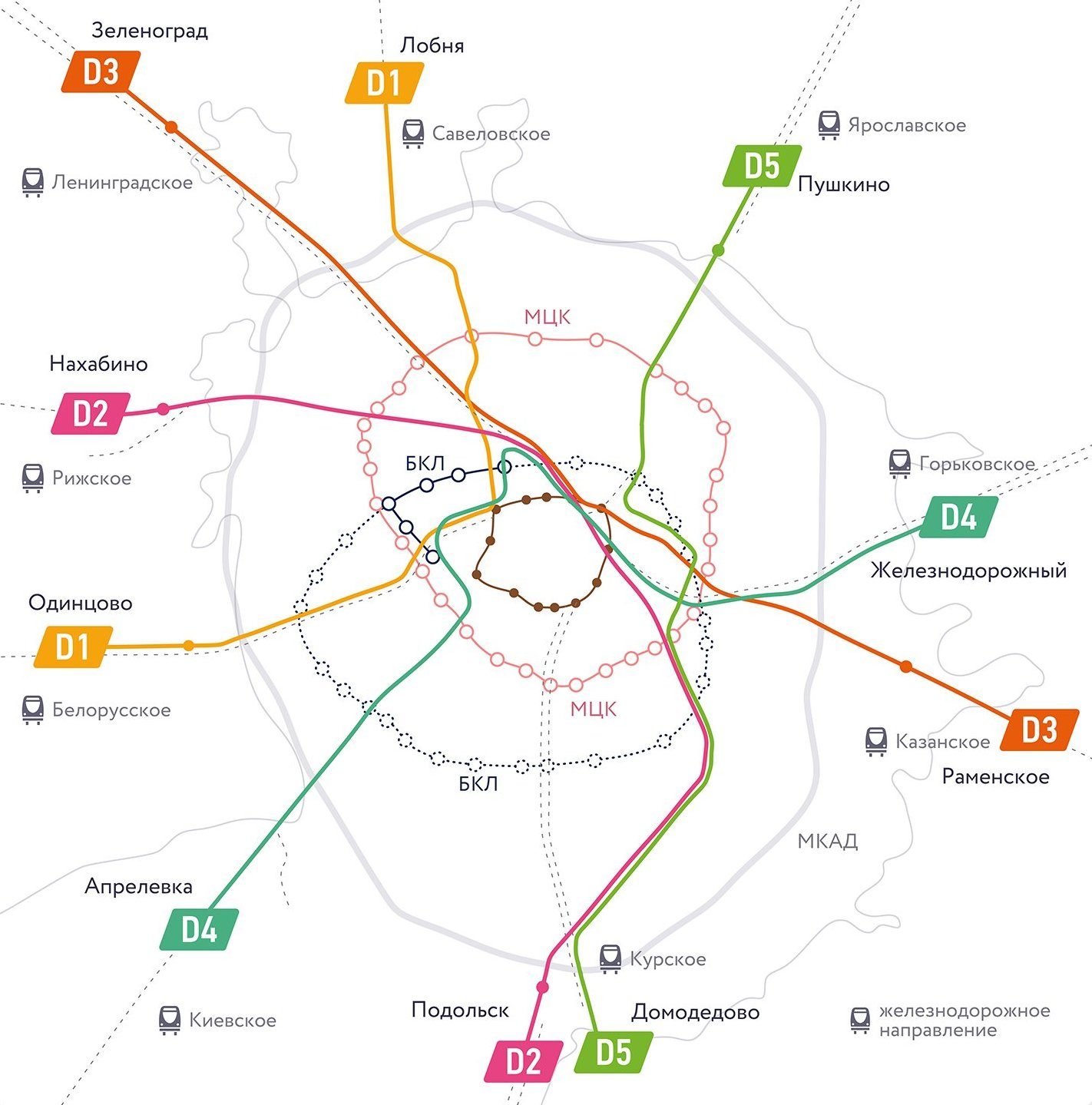

The Moscow Central Diameters (MCD) (Russian: Московские центральные диаметры (МЦД), romanized: Moskovskiye tsentralnye diametry (MTsD)) are a system of passenger rail transport lines in the Moscow agglomeration, created on the basis of the existing Moscow railway infrastructure. In the media and ad campaigns, the project is also widely called a "above-ground metro" (City media refer to it as part of the Moscow Metro), although by definition of characteristics and technical equipment it is not one. Despite being a separate system, the MCD is integrated with the metro by a single fare payment system, similar to other urban electric railways such as the Berlin S-Bahn system or the Paris RER.

The MCD connect Moscow and the cities of the Moscow region: Lobnya, Dolgoprudny, Odintsovo, Krasnogorsk, Podolsk, Zelenograd, Khimki, Lyubertsy, Ramenskoye, Balashikha and Aprelevka. The first two diameters with a total length of 132 km and 60 stations in the mixed open traffic schedule were opened on November 21, 2019. The third diameter was opened on August 17, 2023, and the fourth on September 9, 2023.

== Lines ==
№	Name	Date of opening	Year of opening last station	Length, km	Number of stations	Average distance, km	Travel time, min
#D1 Line D1 (Moscow Central Diameters)	Belorussko-Savyolovsky Diameter	21 November 2019	2020	52	25	2,08	84 — 93
#D2 Line D2 (Moscow Central Diameters)	Kursko-Rizhsky Diameter	21 November 2019	2023	80	37	2,16	120 — 123
#D3 Line D3 (Moscow Central Diameters)	Leningradsko-Kazansky Diameter	17 August 2023	2024	85	39	2,24	111
#D4 Line D4 (Moscow Central Diameters)	Kaluzhsko-Nizhegorodsky Diameter	9 September 2023	2023	86	36	2,39	139
Total:				303	137	2,16	

== Ticket prices ==
The Moscow Central Diameters (MCD) use various ticketing options, including standard suburban tickets, season passes, and Moscow’s “Troika” cards or social cards. The fare depends on the type of ticket and travel distance. When using a “Troika” card, free transfers to/from the metro and MCC (Moscow Central Circle) are available within 90 minutes of the first validation. In contrast, standard tickets do not include free transfers. Contactless bank cards (PayWave/PayPass) can also be used for automatic fare payment at validators or turnstiles.

Fare Zones

MCD operate under three main fare zones:

- Central Zone: Covers stations such as Mark — Setun, Volokolamskaya — Ostafyevo, Khovrino — Ukhtomskaya, and others. The fare is fixed at 57 RUB (June 2024) for “Troika” card users under the “Wallet” tariff. Additional options include tickets for 60 rides, day passes, and contactless bank card payments. Prices match those of the Moscow Metro. Some stations technically located in the Moscow Region, such as Shcherbinka, Ostafyevo, and Reutov, are also part of the Central Zone.
- Suburban Zone: Applies to trips within the Moscow Region or between the Moscow Region and Moscow. Single-trip fares depend on the number of suburban zones crossed:
  - Within one or adjacent zones: 40 RUB.
  - For three or more zones: 40 RUB + 34 RUB × (number of zones - 2).

Using the “Troika” card, the fare is 76 RUB under the “Wallet” tariff, with day passes priced 18–28% higher than in the Central Zone.

- Distant Zone: For trips originating from stations outside the MCD network. Fares using the “Troika” card consist of 34 RUB per suburban zone plus 76 RUB within the MCD (or 87 RUB for the 90-minute tariff). Contactless bank card payments are unavailable in this zone.

== Development Prospects up to 2030 ==
MCD-1

- Savyolovsky railway - Kalyazin
- Belorussky railway - Smolensk

MCD-2

- Kursky railway - Tula
- Rizhsky railway - Rzhev

MCD-3

- Leningradsky railway - Tver
- Ryazansky railway - Ryazan

MCD-4

- Kiyevsky railway - Kaluga
- Gorkovsky railway - Vladimir and Ivanovo

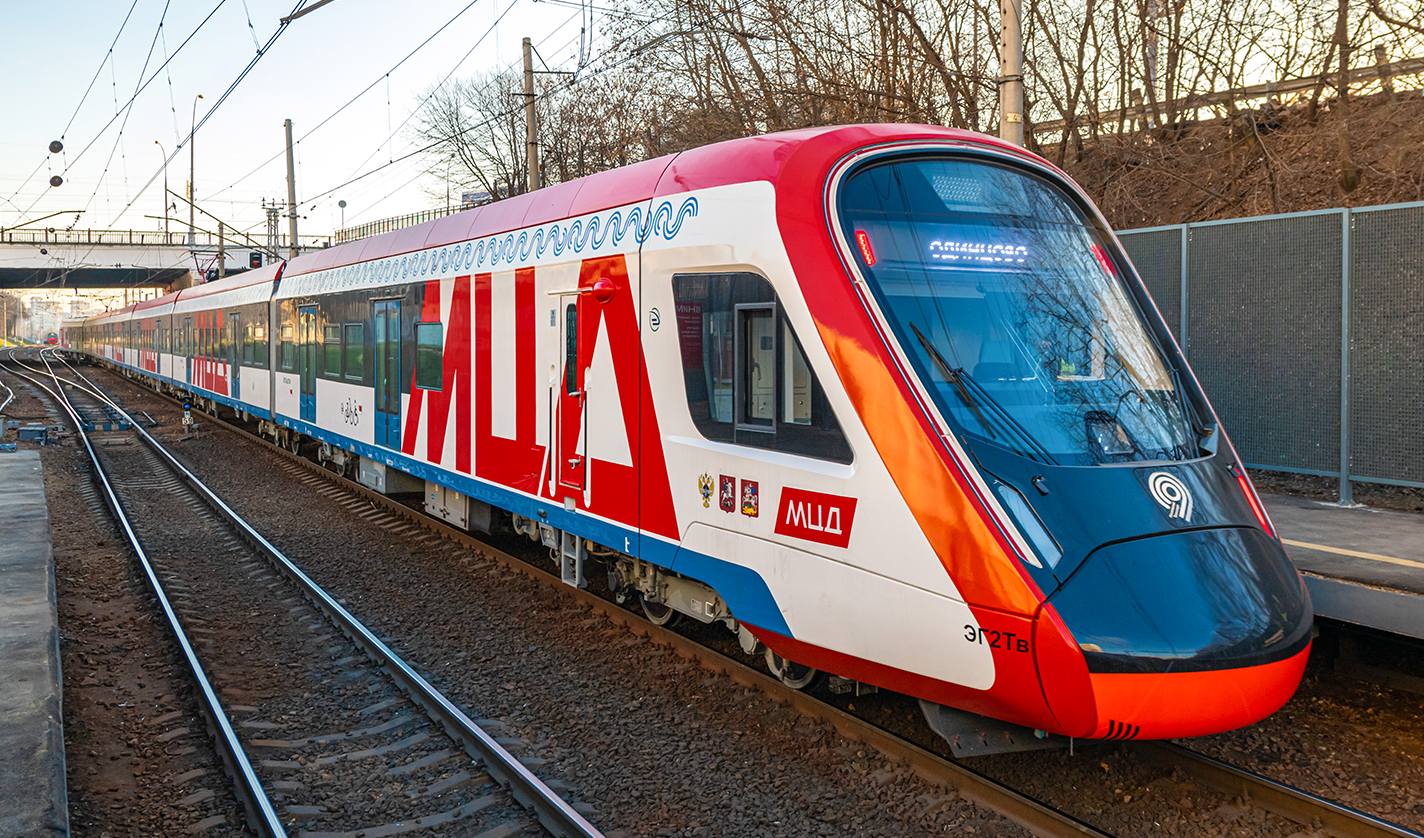
Electric train EG2Tv modification 2.0 on the Begovaya platform

MCD-5

At the moment, it is planned to organize another route, connecting 2 radial directions of the Moscow railway hub in a through diameter. It is assumed that as a result of the project implementation, travel between Moscow airports will take no more than an hour. The new line will also be integrated with the Moscow Central Circle and the metro. Its design is ongoing, the route may be revised.

№	Name	Planned year of opening	Length, km	Number of stations
	Yaroslavsko-Paveletsky Diameter	2025 (Planing)	89	39

== Rolling stock ==
The EG2Tv electric train, better known under the commercial name "Ivolga", was chosen as the basic model for the MCD lines. However, when the first lines were launched, other types of electric trains operated on these routes were connected to the MCD mode.

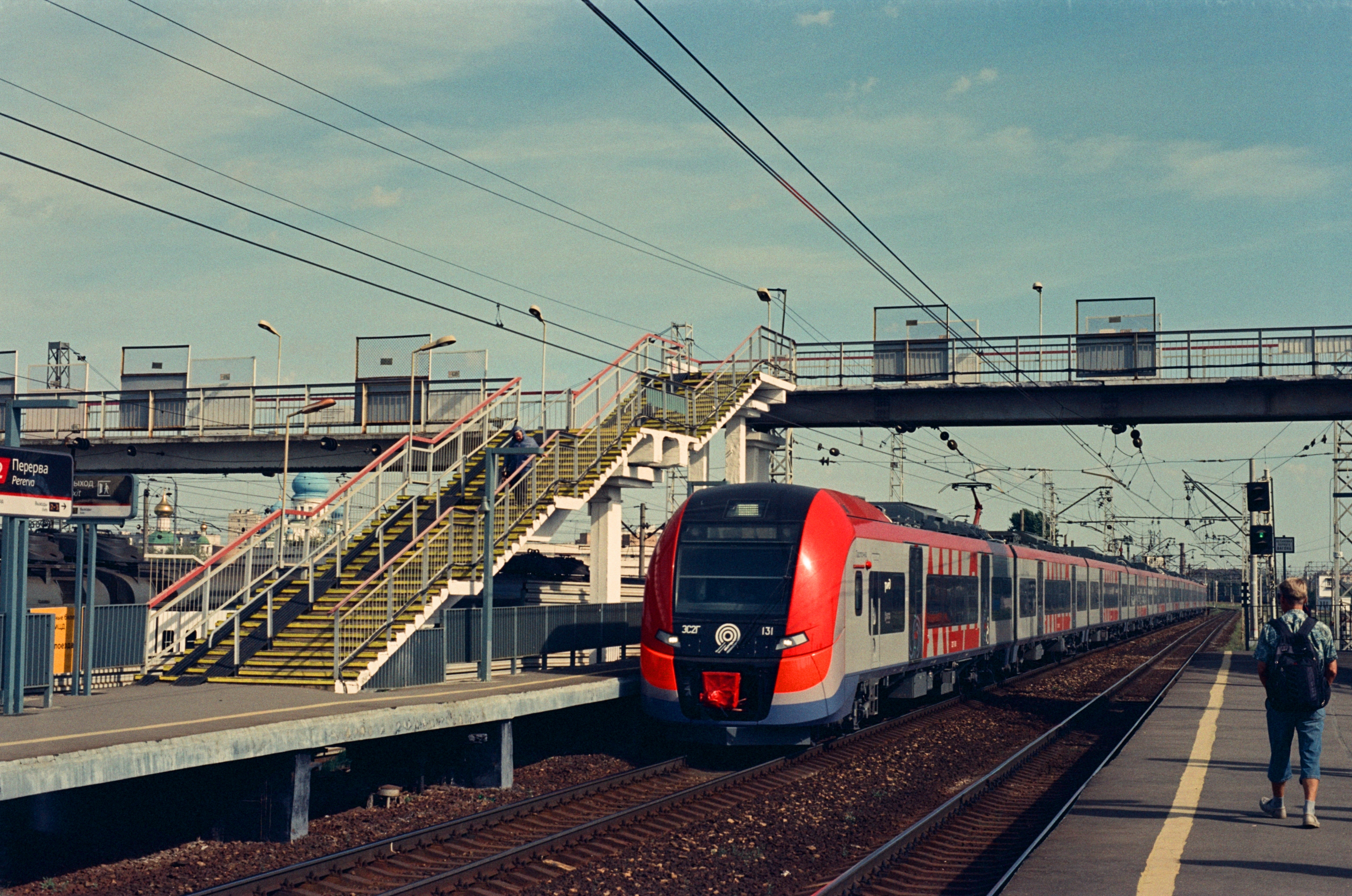
ES2G "Lastochka" in Moscow Central Diameters livery

For the first two Moscow Central Diameters, it was planned to use six- and seven-car electric trains of the EG2Tv "Ivolga" series. When choosing a model of trains for the MCD, the government focused on trains with a layout for suburban-urban and intracity transportation of Russian production. Among the main options considered were the ES2G "Lastochka" electric trains operated on the MCC, manufactured by the Ural Locomotives Plant, EG2Tv "Ivolga" and EP2Tv by the Tver Plant, as well as the EP2D by the Demikhovsky Plant.

At the end of 2017, CSPC, selected as the carrier, announced a tender for the supply of 23 five-car trains starting in the summer of 2018 for operation on one of the diameters. In March 2018, CSPC announced that it was decided to conclude a contract for the specified batch of trains with TVZ, as the only participant in the open tender. Accordingly, the EG2Tv Ivolga urban electric train was selected, which by that time was already in operation in the CSPC fleet in the amount of two units. Later, the conditions were revised - the composition was changed to six-car, and the number of trains increased to 24. On the trains of the second batch, the plant introduced a new shape of the front part of the driver's cab, doors with larger glass and made a number of changes to the passenger compartment. Thus, it was decided to supply 39 trains for operation on the Moscow Central Diameters — 24 six-car trains with a conventional cabin with a protrusion at the bottom (version "Ivolga 1.0") and 15 seven-car trains with a new smooth cabin (version "Ivolga 2.0").

All "Ivolga" electric trains for the MCD received a new paint scheme in the style of the "Moscow Transport" brand, using the main white and additional blue (patterns and lower stripe on the side), black (front of the cabin and frame of the side windows) and red (sides of the front part and roof), which differs from the paint scheme of the first two trains, which also used the "Moscow Transport" theme, but with a predominance of blue.

After the launch of the MCD, all "Ivolga" trains of modification 1.0 and temporarily several trains of modification 2.0 were transferred to the second diameter, and a little later all trains of modification 2.0 were transferred to the first diameter, as originally planned. In December 2019, two trains of modification 1.0 were again temporarily transferred from the second to the first diameter. At the same time, trains of both modifications initially operated in single mode, but subsequently began to operate in double mode in a composition of 6+5 cars due to errors in passenger flow forecasts and large-scale criticism of the project.

== Gallery ==
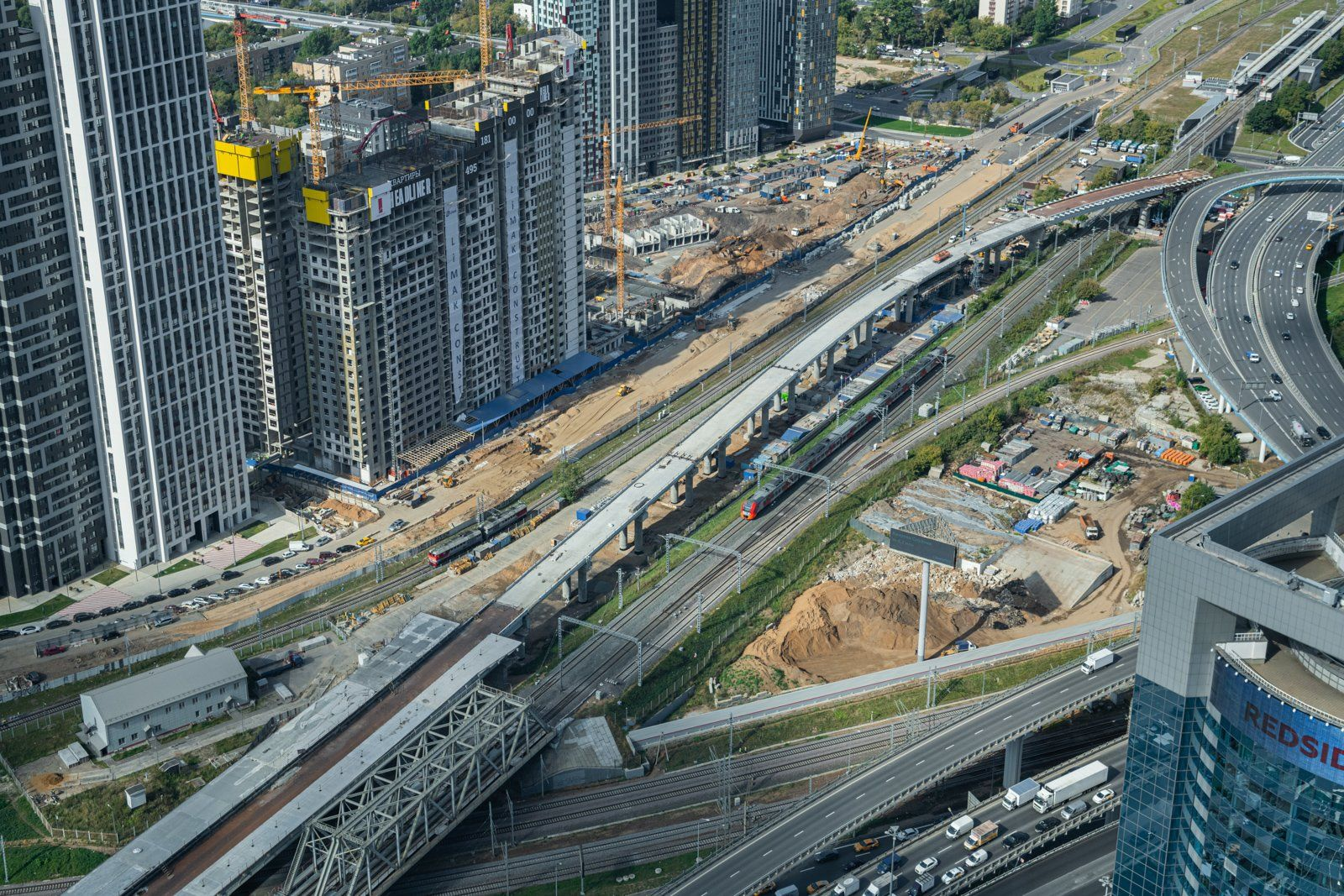
Construction of the connecting branch on Line D4 and Kamushki railway station near the Moscow International Business Center.

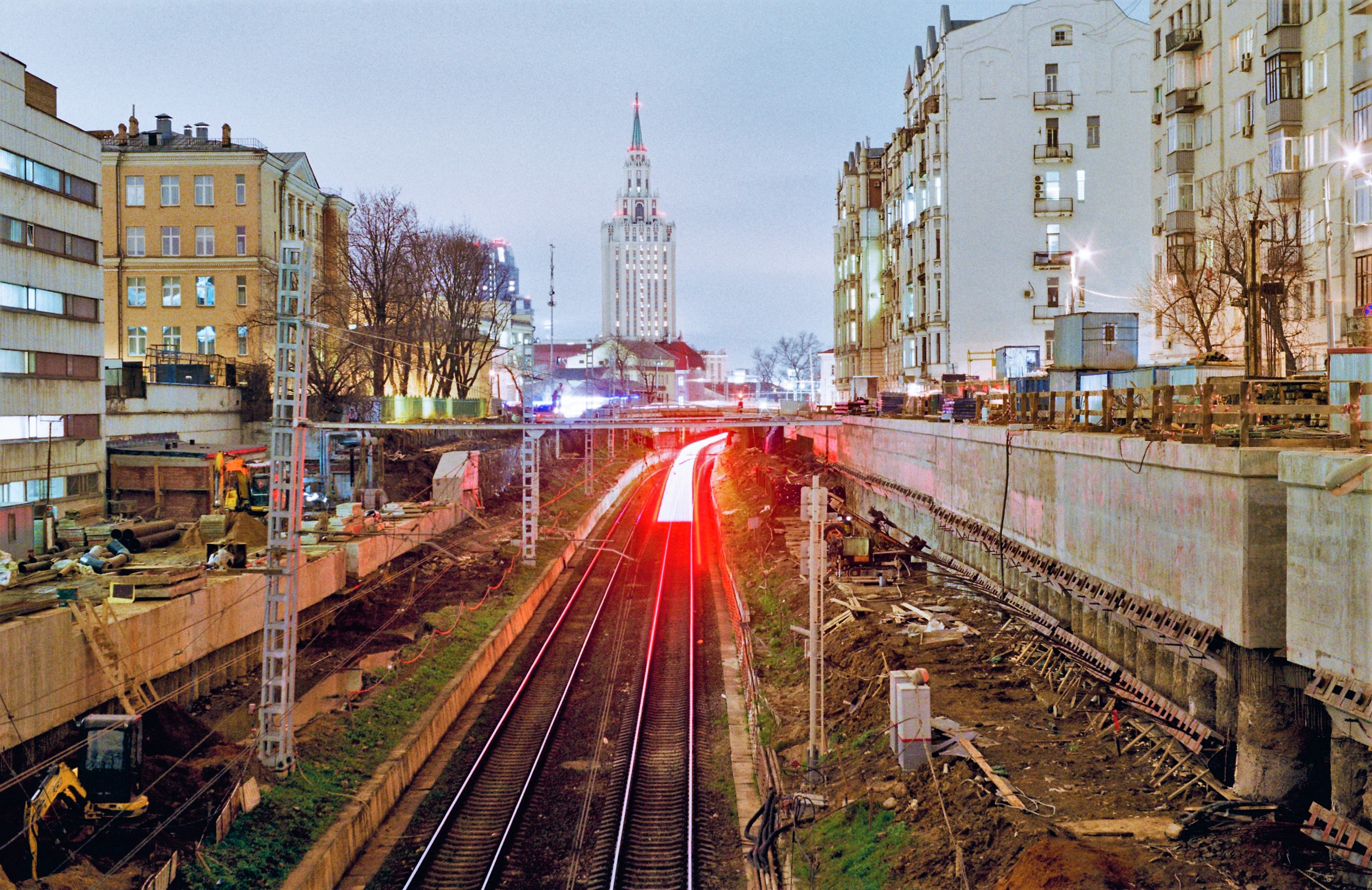
Kurskaya – Kalanchyovskaya section of Line D2. Construction of additional tracks for Line D4 is underway.

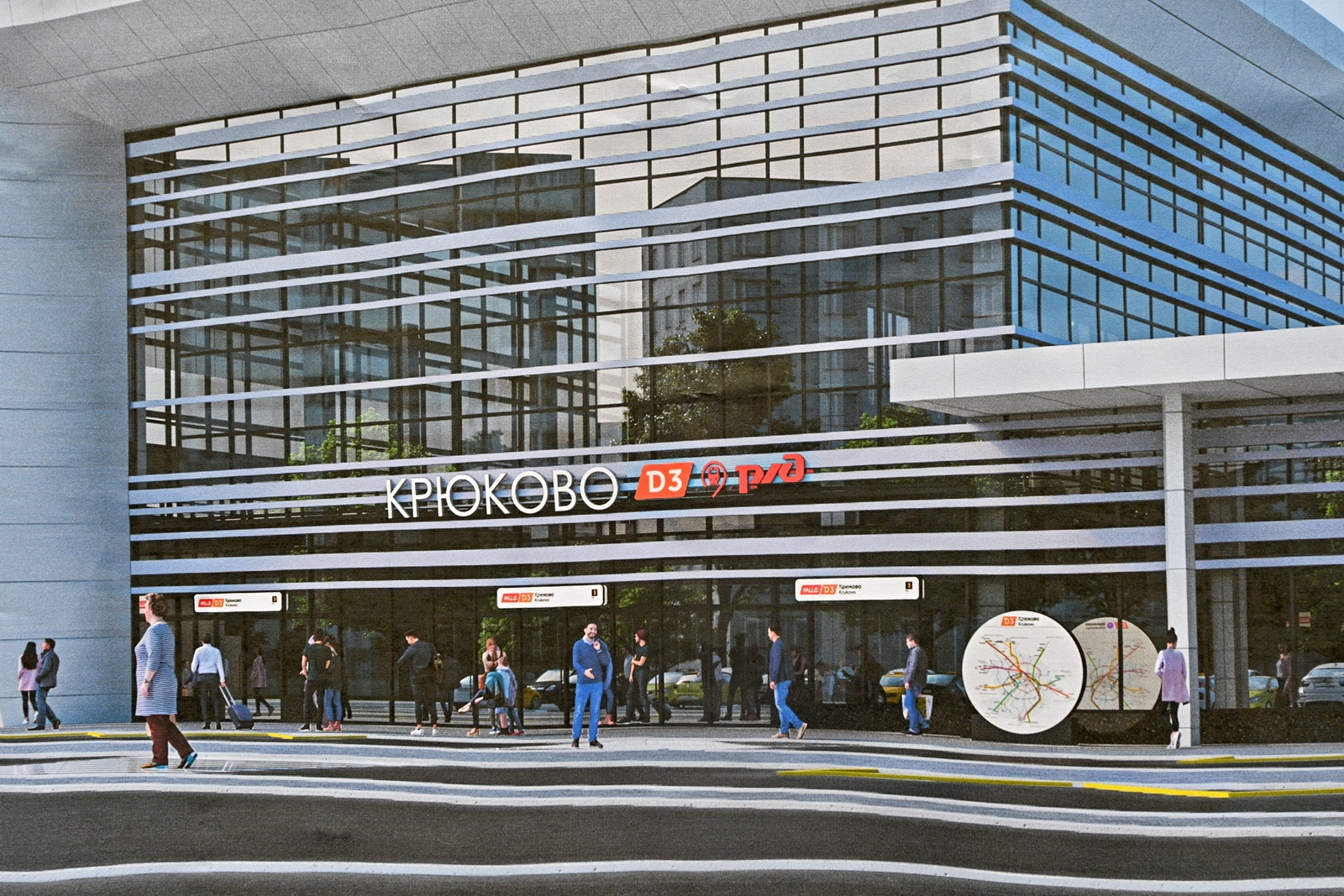
Krykovo station MCD-3 in Zelenograd

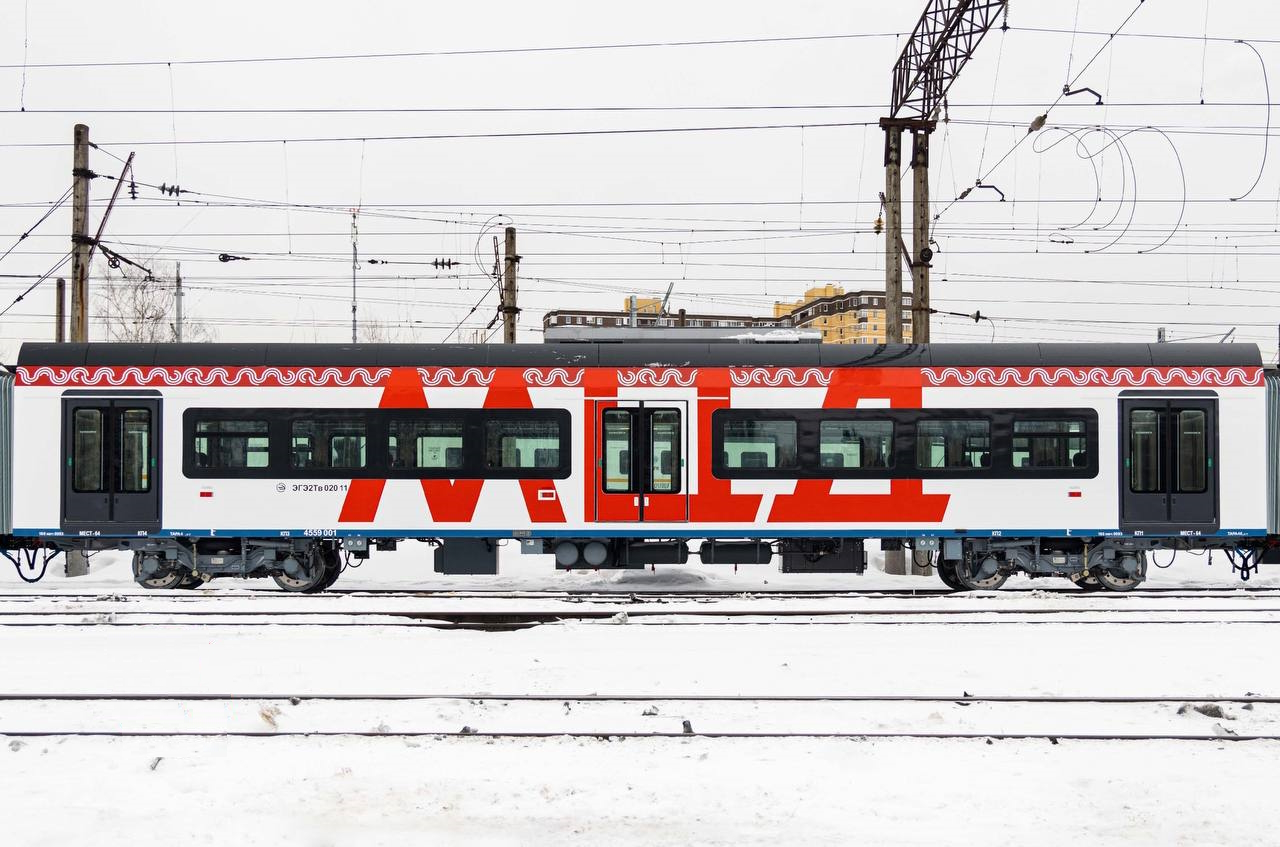
Carriage of the EGE2Tv train in MCD livery

== See also ==
- Réseau Express Régional
- Crossrail
- S-Bahn
