= O class =

O class or Class O may refer to:

== Rail transport ==
- Highland Railway O Class, a British class of 2-4-0, later 4-4-0T, steam locomotives built in the late 1870s
- NER Class O, a British 0-4-4T steam locomotive class
- NZR O class, a locomotive class of New Zealand steam engines built in the United States
- Russian locomotive class O, an early type of Russian steam locomotive
- SER O class, a British 0-6-0 steam locomotive class
- South Australian Railways O class (first), 2-8-0 steam locomotives
- South Australian Railways O class (second), 4-4-0 steam locomotive
- Victorian Railways O class, 0-6-0 steam locomotives
- WAGR O class, Australian 2-8-0 steam locomotive class built in the late 19th century
- O-class Melbourne tram
- O-class Sydney tram

== Stars ==
- Class O stars, the rarest of all main sequence stars

== Vessels ==
- O and P-class destroyer, the first ships built under the United Kingdom's War Emergency Programme destroyers
- O-class battlecruiser, a class of warships planned for the German Navy just prior to the Second World War
- O-class submarine (disambiguation)
  - Class O, several early submarine classes of the Royal Netherlands Navy
  - Oberon-class submarine
  - Odin-class submarine
  - United States O-class submarine
