= South Australian Railways O class =

South Australian Railways O class may refer to:

- South Australian Railways O class (first), 2-8-0 steam locomotives
- South Australian Railways O class (second), 4-4-0 steam locomotive
