= Moscow Rizhsky railway station =

Railway station in Moscow

Coordinates: 55°47′34″N 37°37′57″E

Moscow–Rizhsky Москва–Рижская
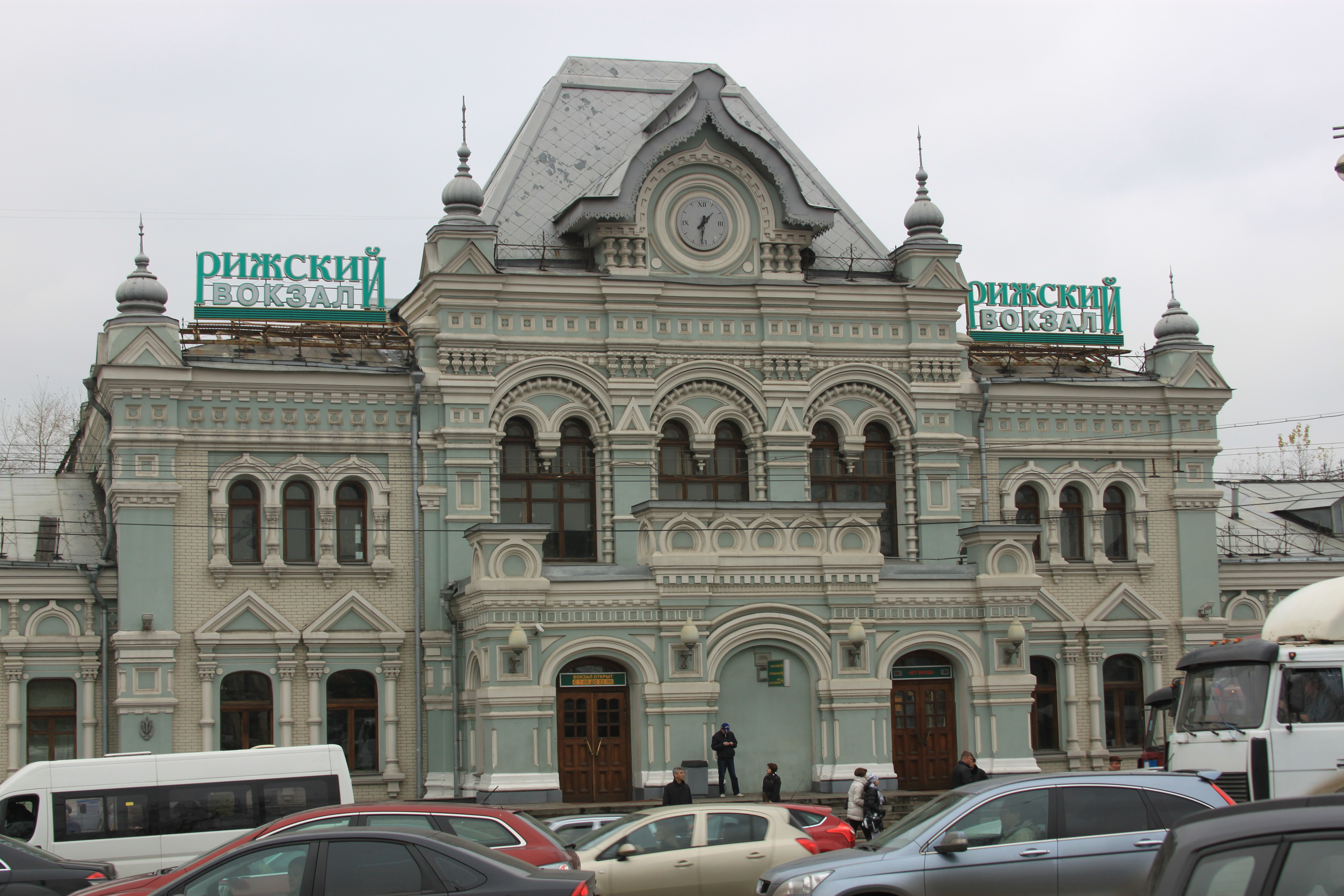
- View of the station's main entrance

General information
- Location: Rizhskaya Square; Moscow; Russia
- System: Moscow–Rizhsky
- Platforms: 2
- Tracks: 4
- Connections: Moscow metro station: Rizhskaya; Bus: H6, M2, M9, T18, 0, 19, 38, 84, 85, 172, 239, 265, 379, 714, 778, 903; Trolleybus: 14, 42

Construction
- Structure type: At-grade
- Parking: No

Other information
- Station code: 196108
- Fare zone: 0

History
- Opened: 1901
- Former names: Vindavsky, Baltiysky, Rzhevsky

Services
Preceding station	Russian Railways	Following station
Dmitrovskaya towards Shakhovskaya	Rizhsky Suburban	Terminus
Location

Rizhsky station (Russian: Рижский вокзал, Rizhsky vokzal, Riga station) is one of the ten main railway stations in Moscow, Russia. It was built in 1901 and as well as being an active station, it is also home to the Moscow Railway Museum. The station is operated by the Moscow Railway.

It is located at Rizhskaya Square, at the crossing of Mira Avenue and Sushchyovsky Val, connected to the Rizhskaya metro station.

== History ==
The construction of the railway between Moscow and Vindava started in 1897. On June 30, 1901 the passenger traffic between Moscow and Volokolamsk was opened. Since the main station in Moscow was not ready at the time, the eastern terminal station in Moscow was Sortirovochnaya (currently Podmoskovnaya). The Vindavsky railway station, currently the Rizhsky railway station, was opened in September 11, 1901. The building, of eclectic style, was designed by architect Stanislav Brzhozovsky. The construction was supervised by the Yuly Diederichs.

After 1918, when Latvia became independent, the former Vindava line decayed, since it did not serve any big cities. In 1930, the station was renamed Baltiysky railway station. In 1942, it became the Rzhevsky railway station, and since January 1 1948, after Latvia's annexation to the Soviet Union, it was rebranded as Rizhsky railway station. Originally, the suburban railway line was scheduled to be electrified in 1943, but the electrification of the stretch between Moscow and Nakhabino only occurred in 1945, after the end of World War II.

== Trains and destinations ==
=== Long distance ===
Train number	Train name	Destination	Operated by
001/002	Latvia Express (lat: Latvijas Ekspresis)	(Latvia) Riga	(Latvia) Latvian Railways

=== Other destinations ===
Country	Destination
Russia	Velikiye Luki, Volokolamsk, Rzhev, Rzhev Memorial Station Sebezh

=== Suburban destinations ===
Suburban commuter trains (elektrichka) connect the Rizhsky station with stations and platforms of the Rizhsky suburban railway line, specifically with the towns of Krasnogorsk, Dedovsk, Istra, and Volokolamsk.

== Moscow Railway Museum at Rizhsky station ==
In 2004, the open-air site of the Museum of the Moscow Railway was opened next to Rizhsky railway station. The other location of this museum shows Lenin's funeral train in the Museum of the Moscow Railway (Paveletskaya station).

== Gallery ==
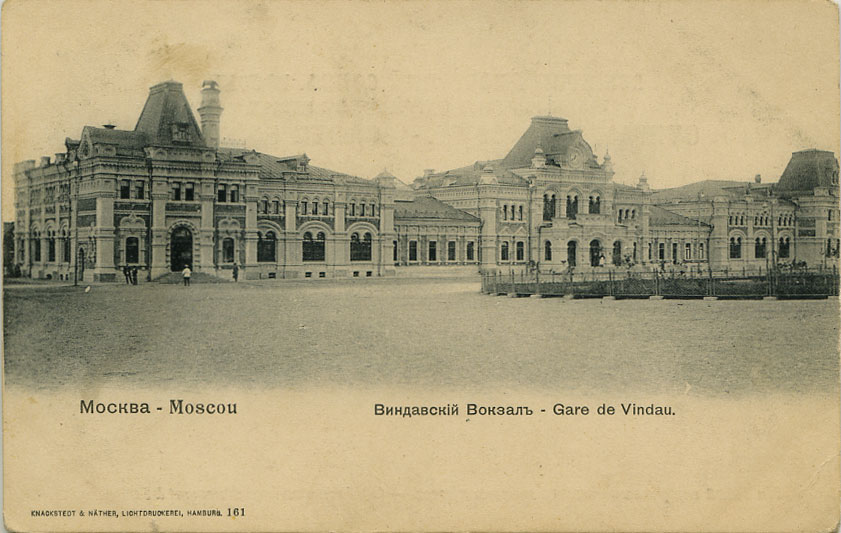
Historical view of the station (early 20th century)

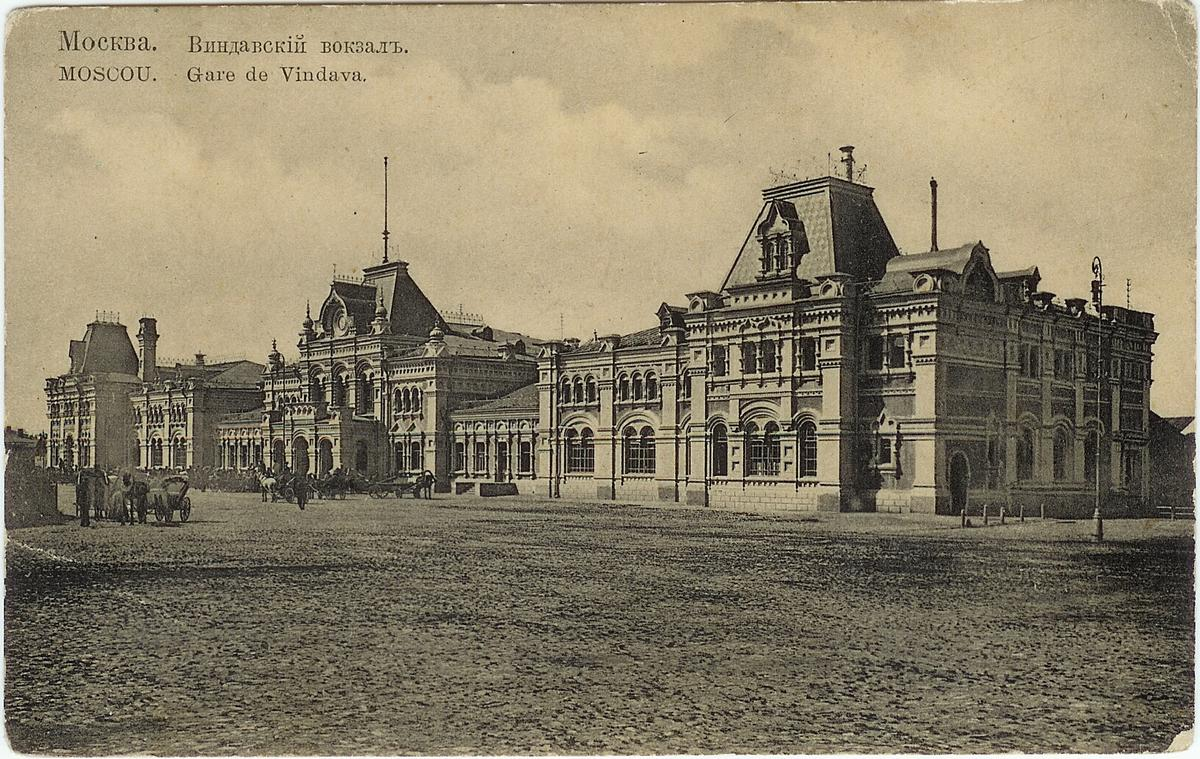
Historical view of the station (early 20th century)

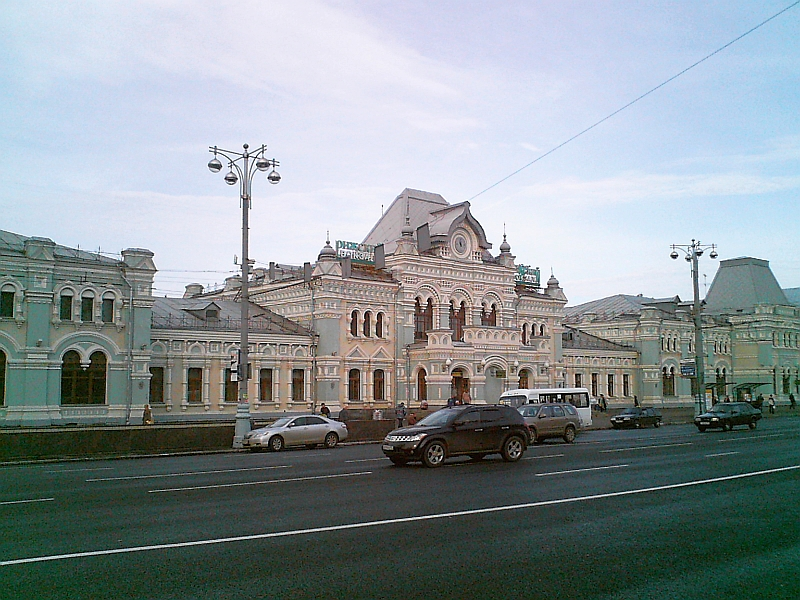

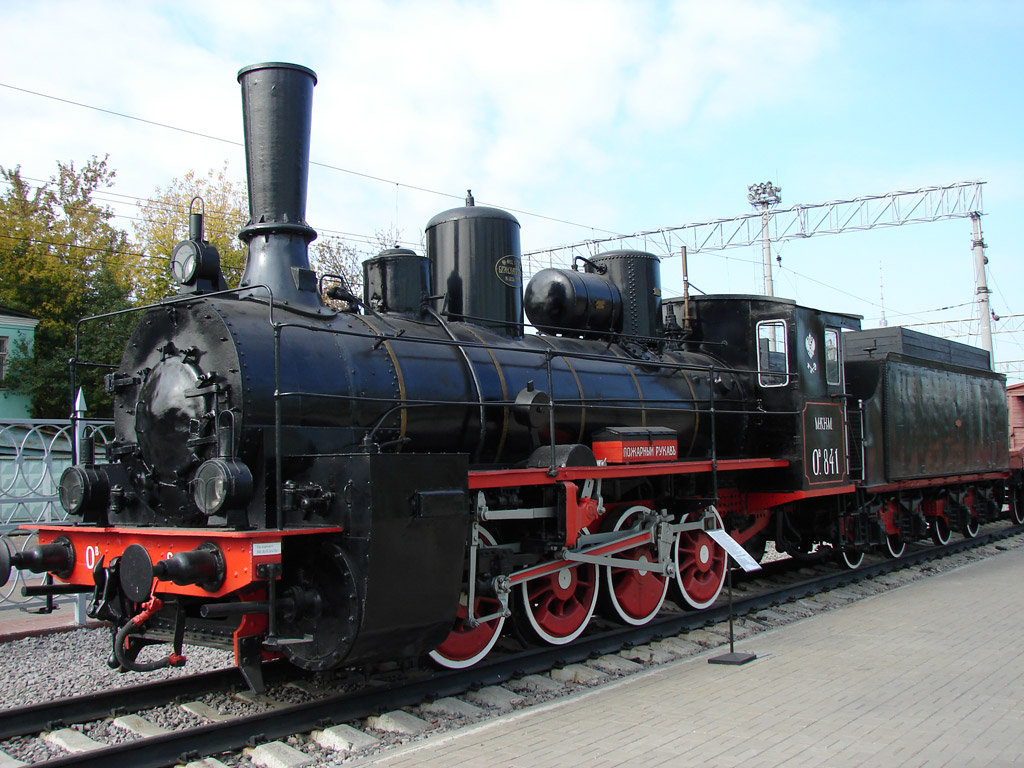
Preserved Russian locomotive class O steam locomotive Ov-841 at Rizhsky station

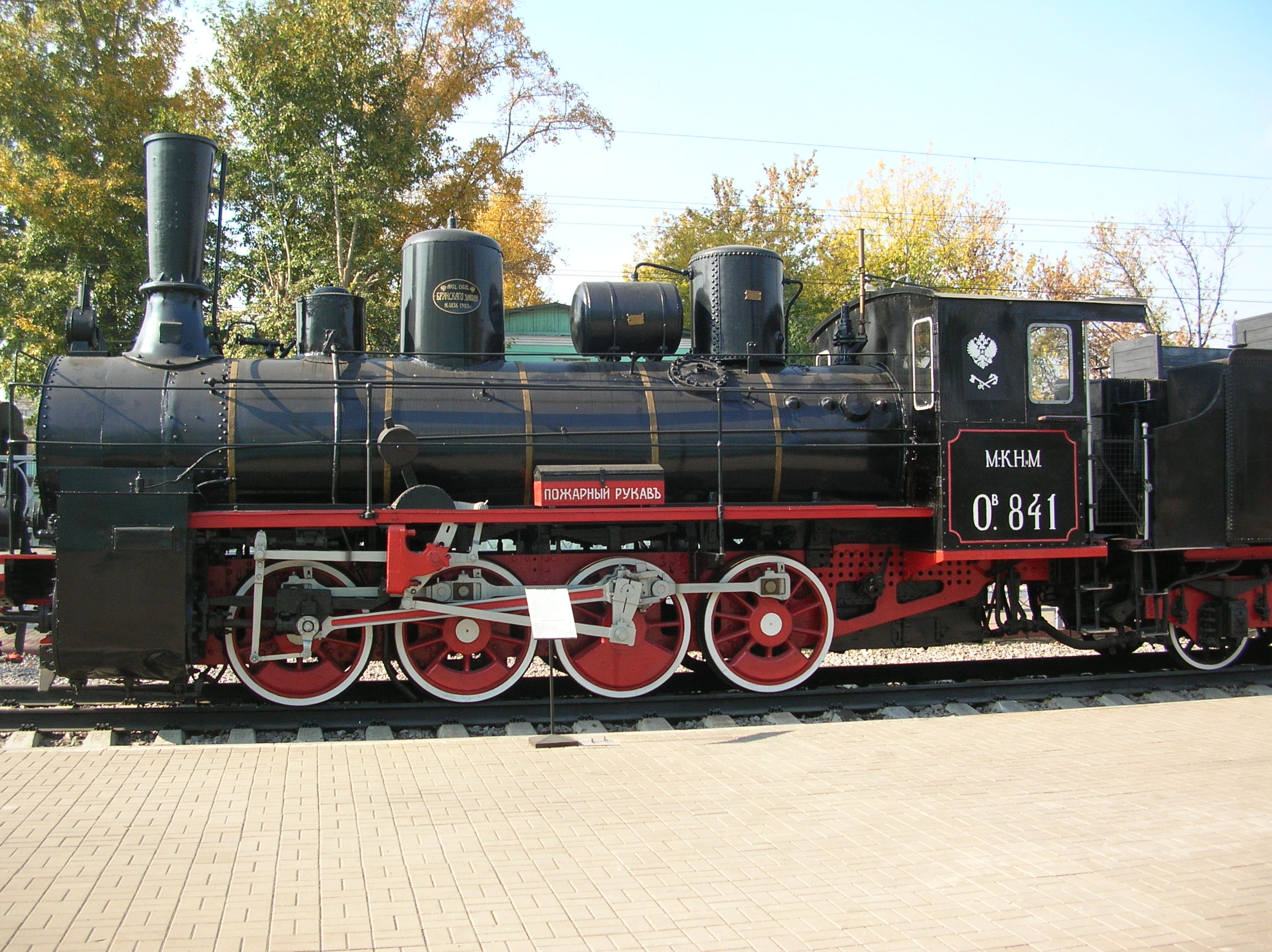
Russian locomotive class O Ov-841 at Moscow Railway Museum at Rizhsky station

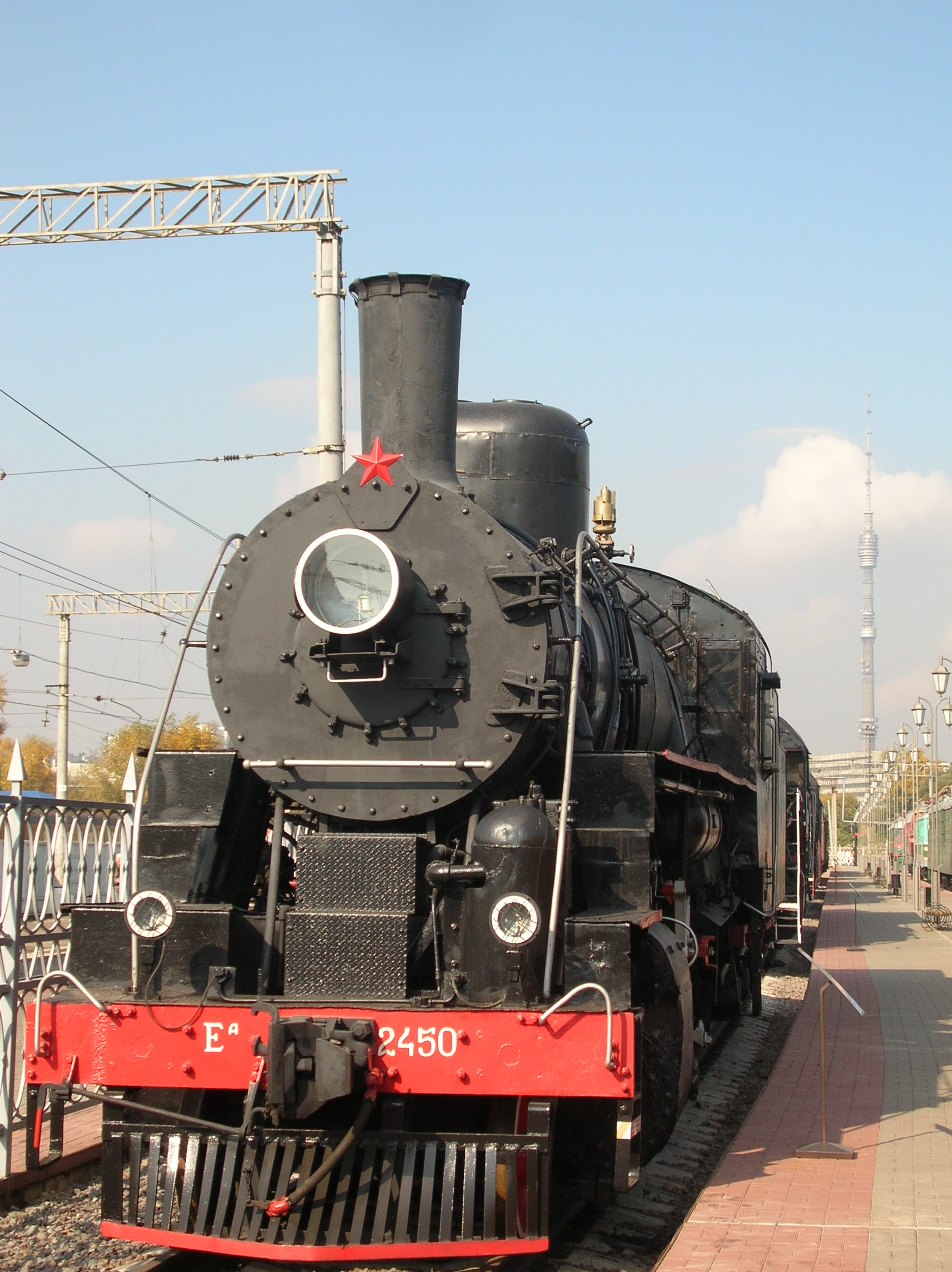
Russian locomotive class Ye Yea-2450 at Moscow Railway Museum at Rizhsky station

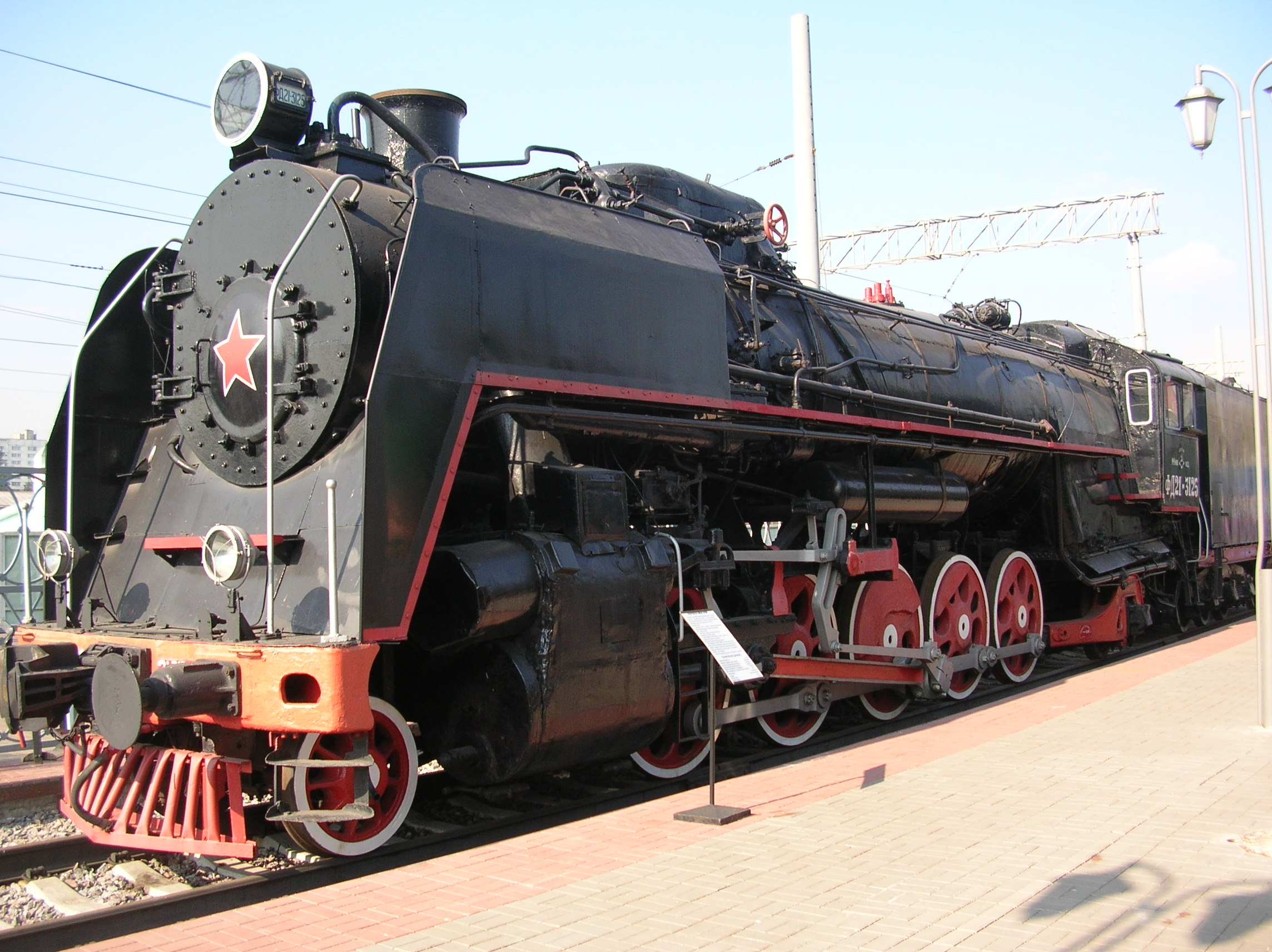
Russian locomotive class FD FD 21-3125 at Moscow Railway Museum at Rizhsky station

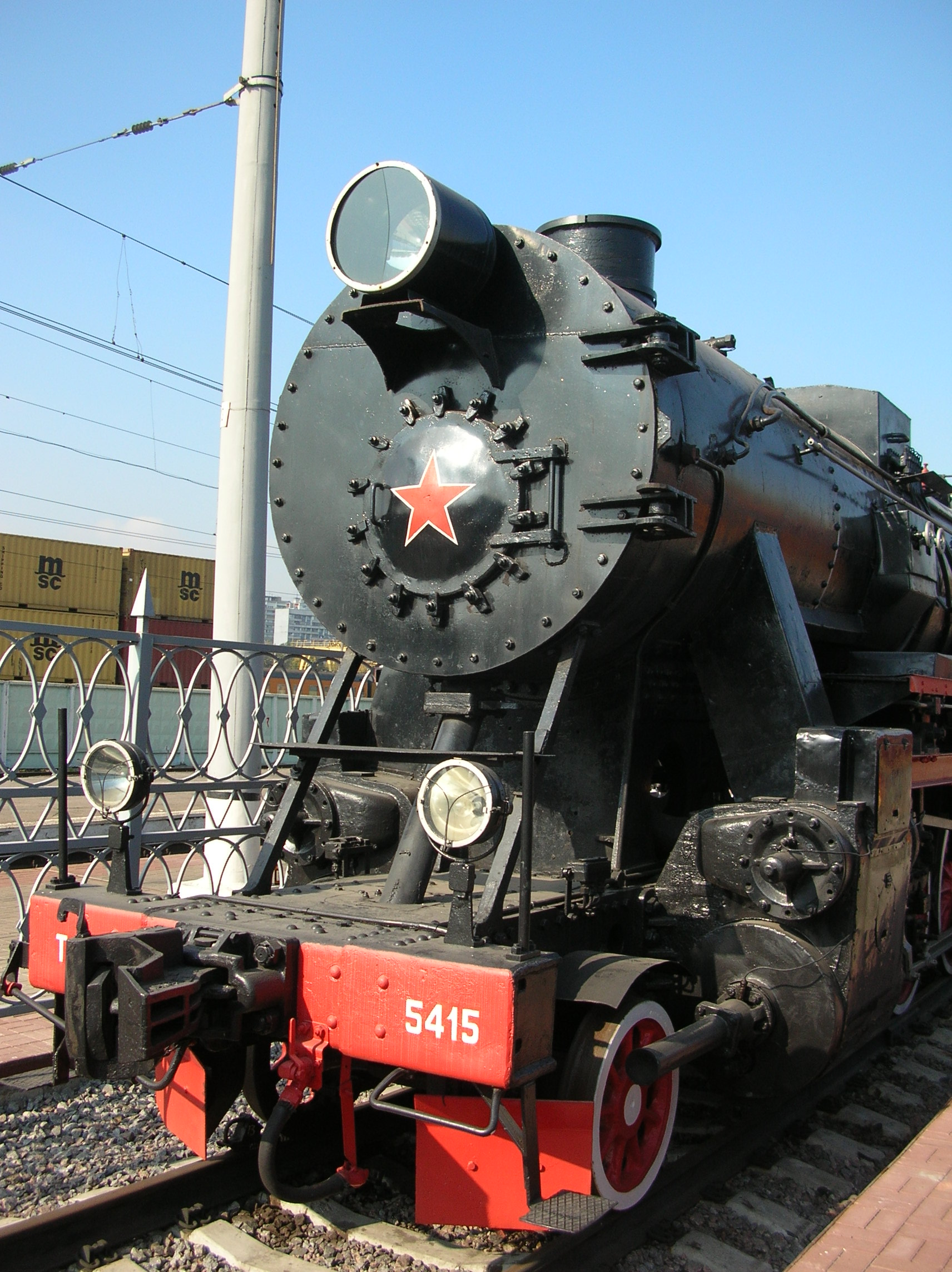
Russian locomotive class TE TE 5415 at Moscow Railway Museum at Rizhsky station

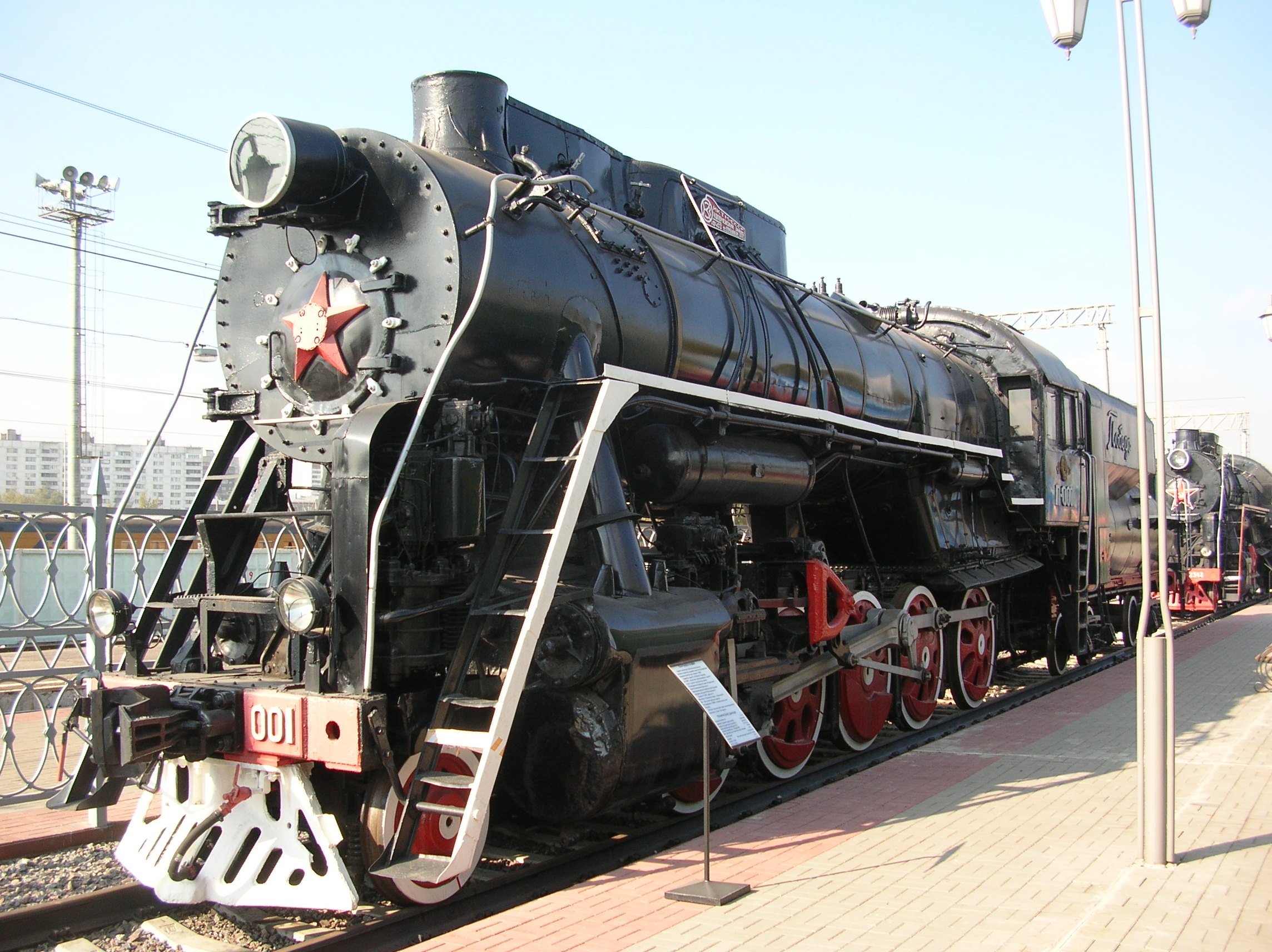
L-001 at Moscow Railway Museum at Rizhsky station

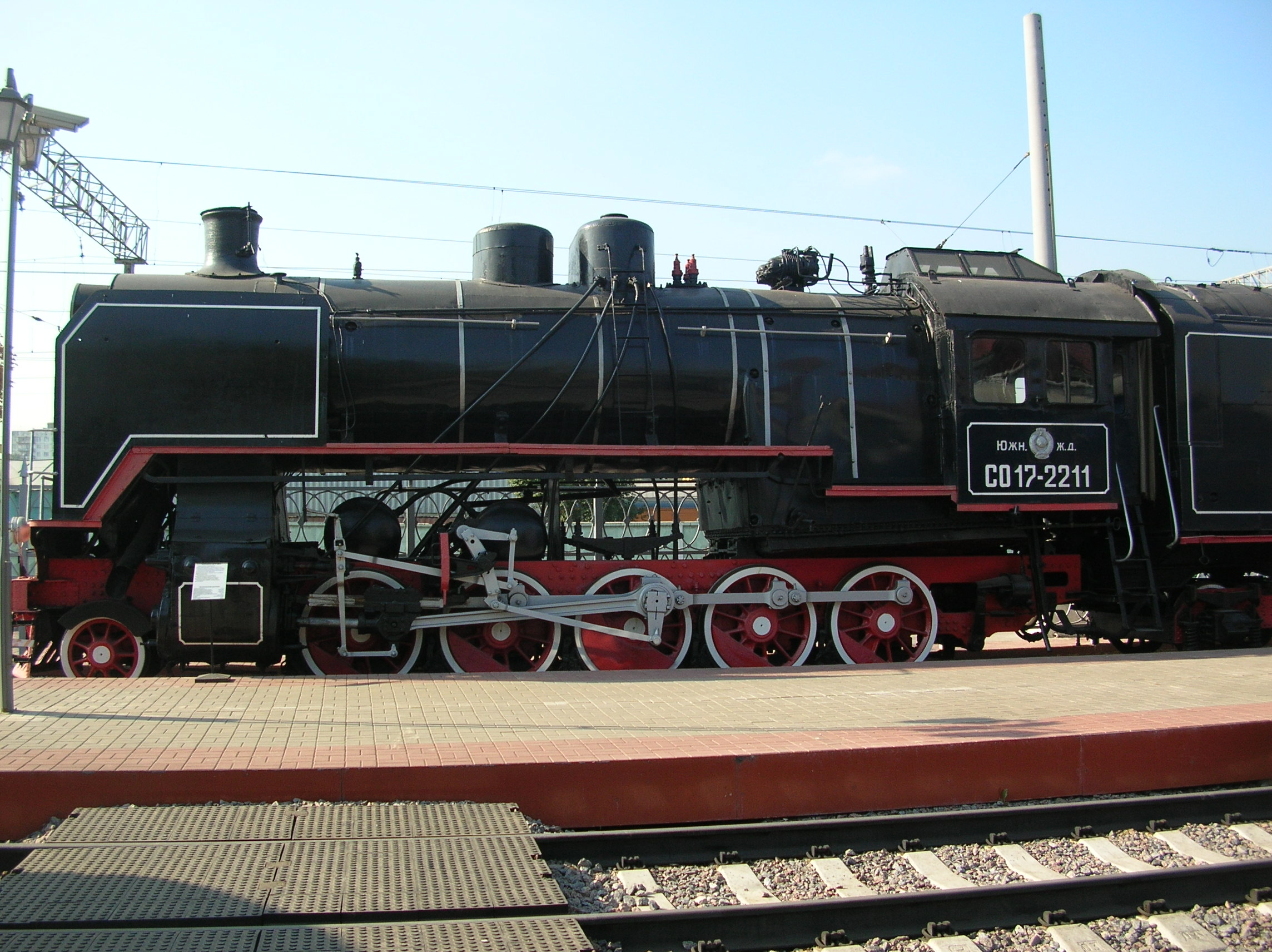
CO 1722-11 at Moscow Railway Museum at Rizhsky station

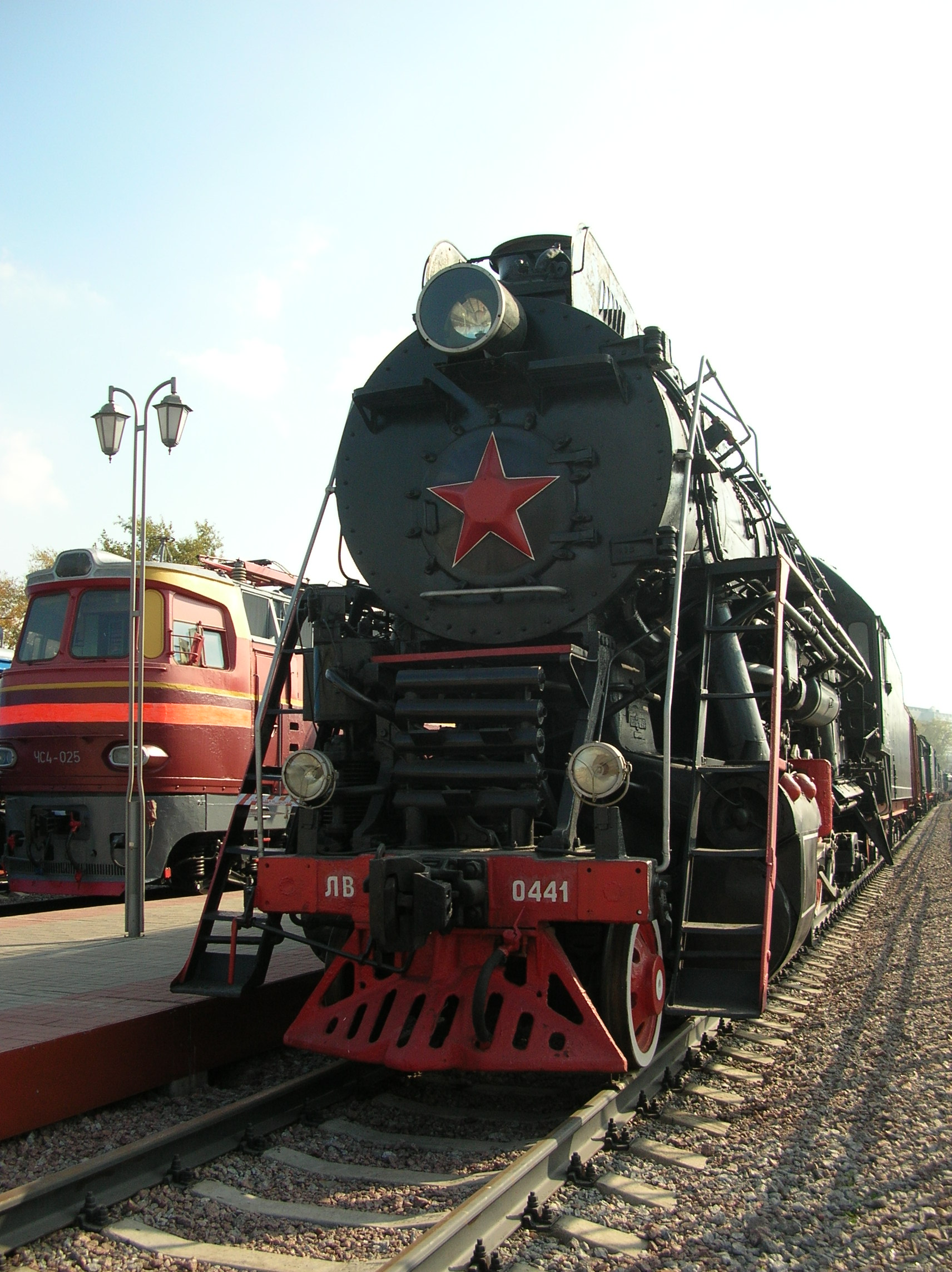
LV 0441 at Moscow Railway Museum at Rizhsky station

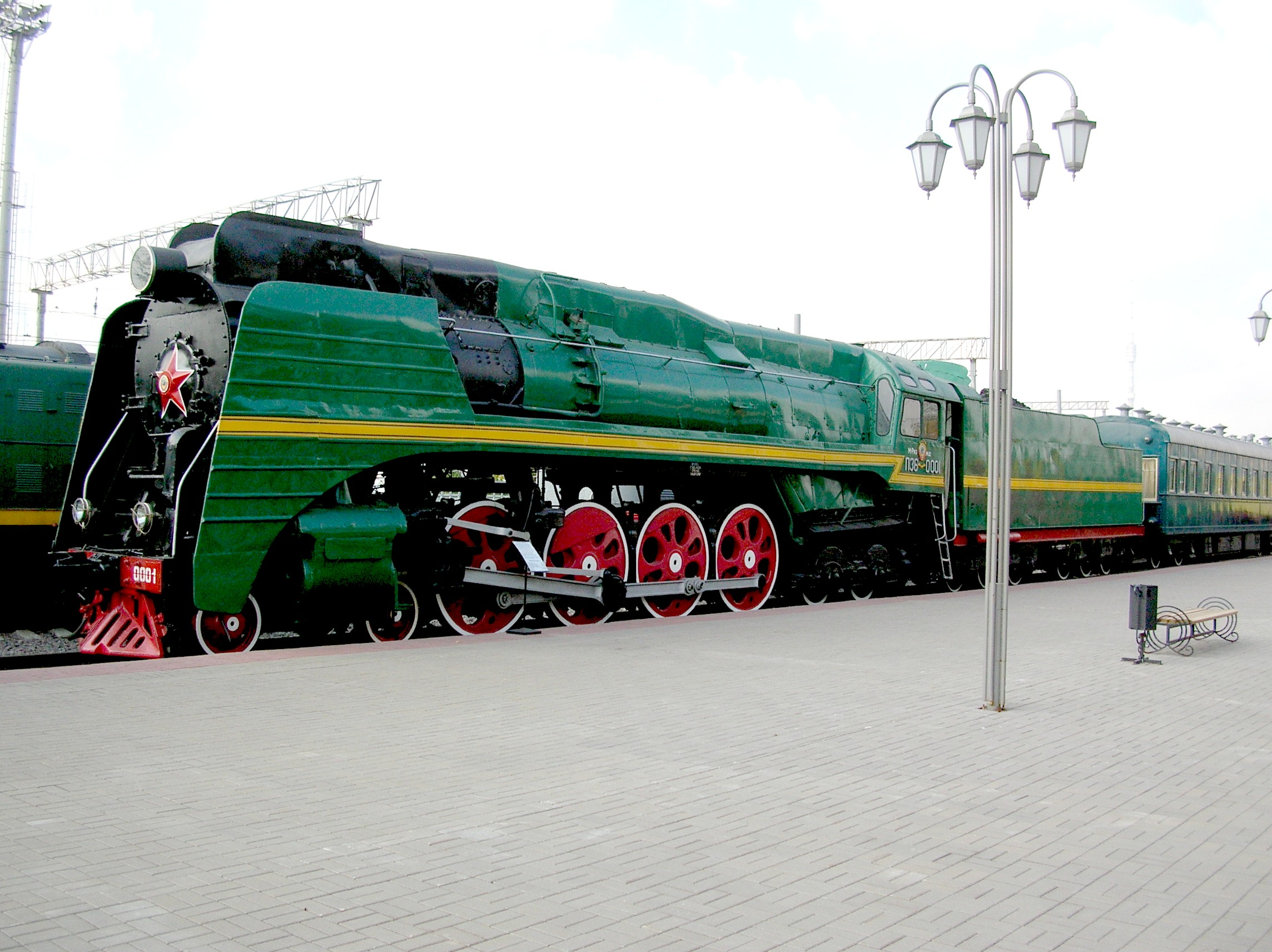
P36-001 at Moscow Railway Museum at Rizhsky station

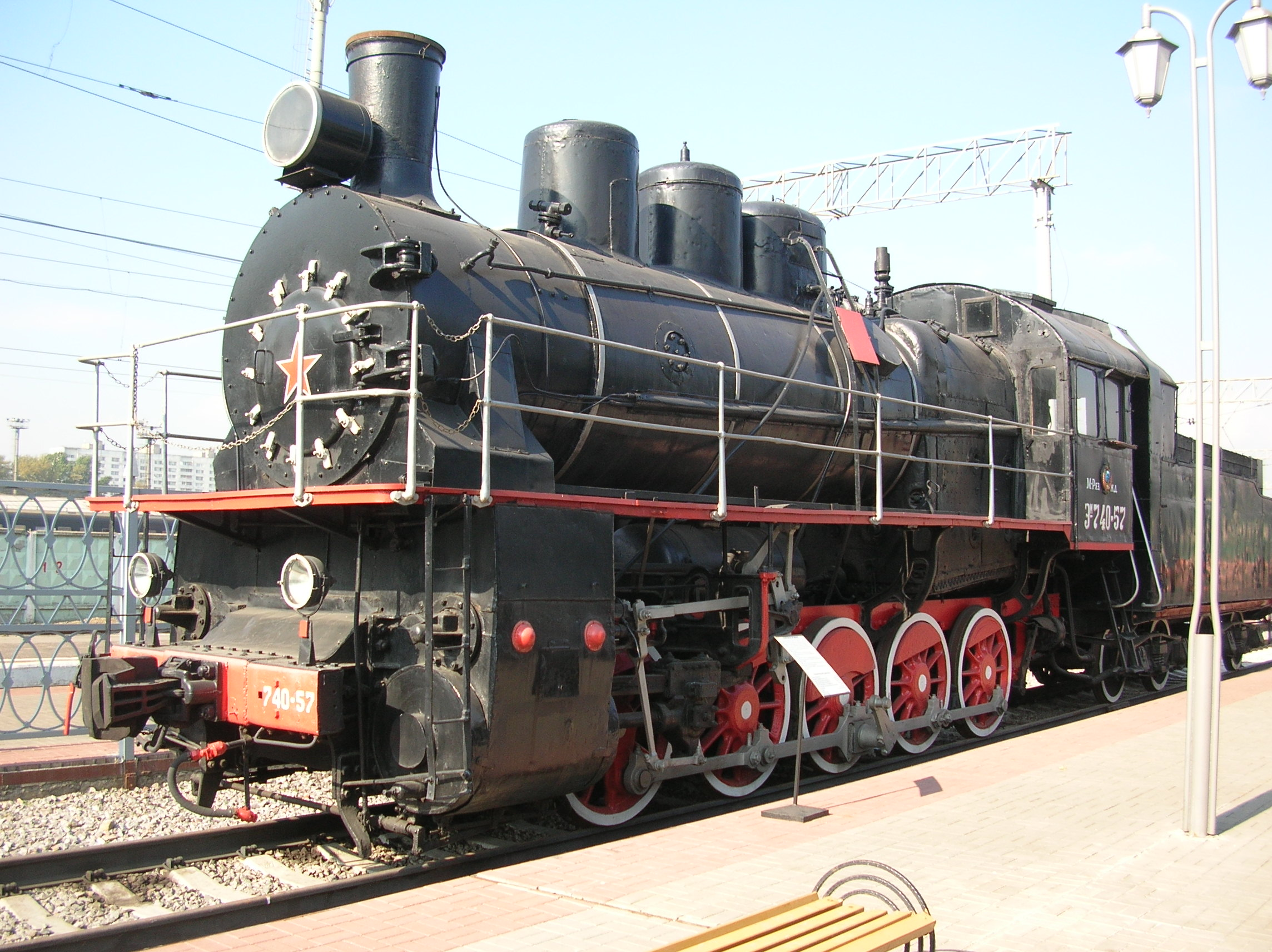
Em 74-57 at Moscow Railway Museum at Rizhsky station

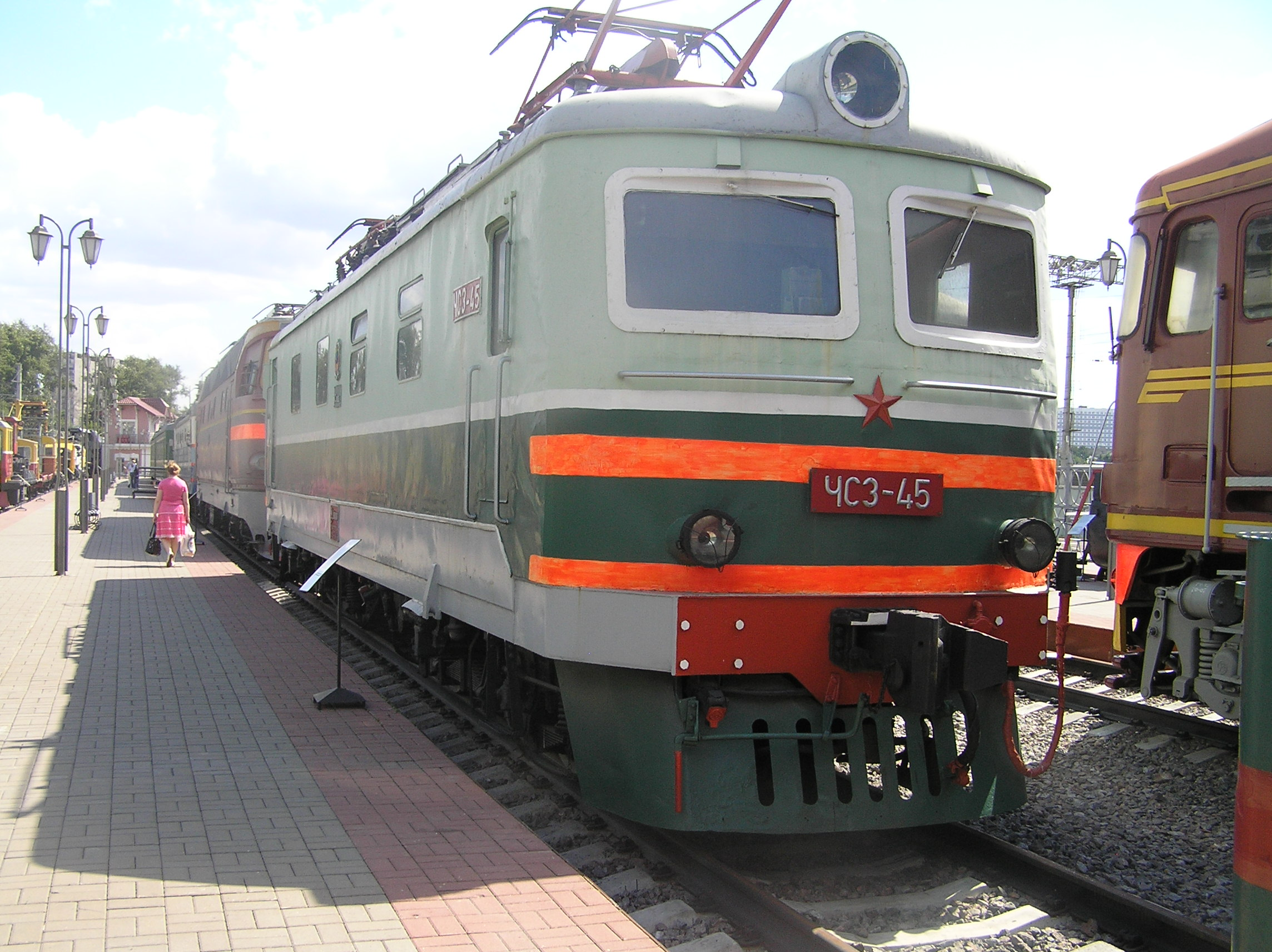
ChS3-45 at the Moscow Railway Museum, Rizhsky station

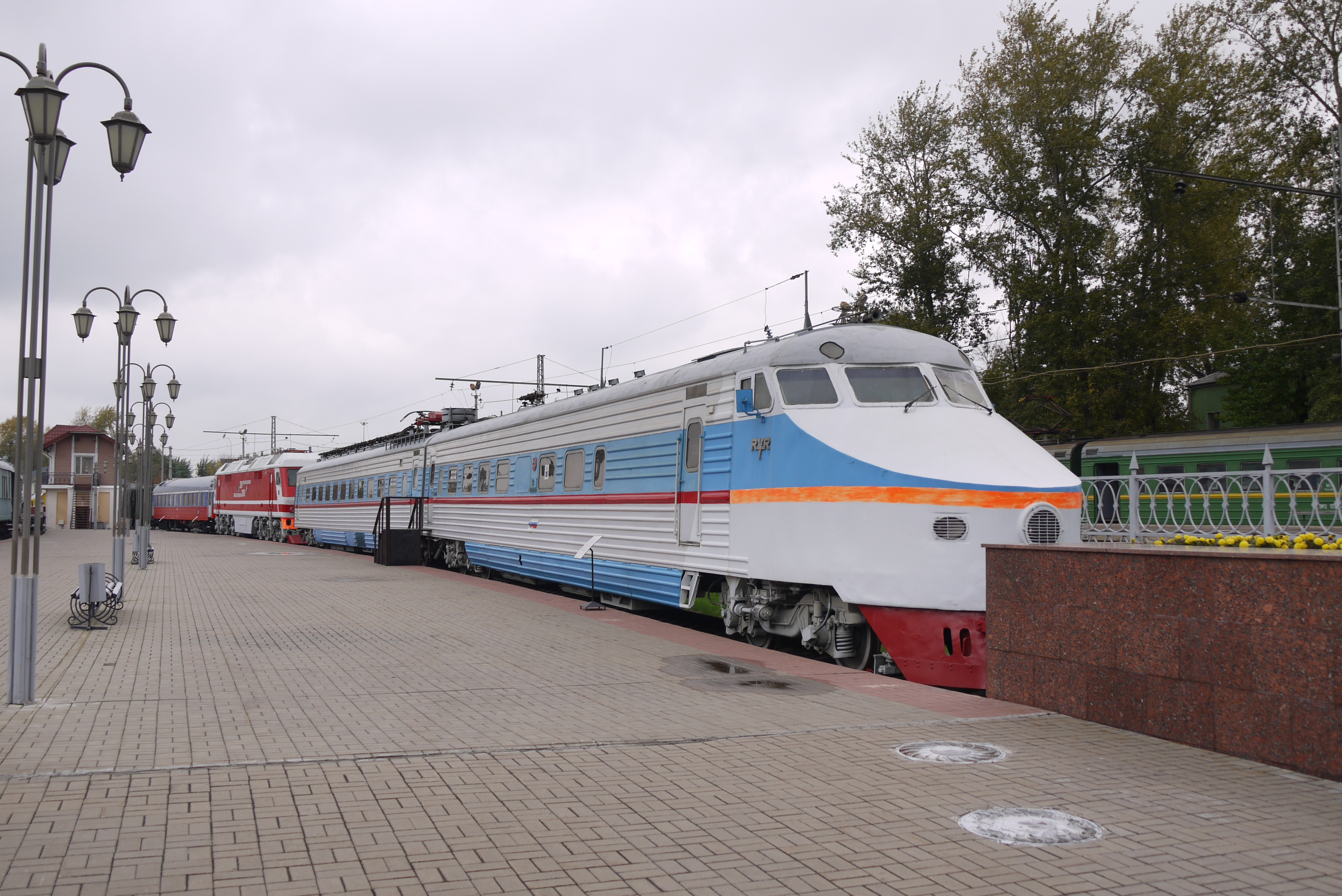
ER200-105 at the Moscow Railway Museum, Rizhsky station

== See also ==
- The Museum of the Moscow Railway, at Paveletsky railway station, Moscow
- Russian Railway Museum, in St. Petersburg
- Finland Station, St. Petersburg
- History of rail transport in Russia
- Emperor railway station in Pushkin town
- List of Moscow tourist attractions
- List of railway museums (worldwide)
- Heritage railways
- List of heritage railways
- Restored trains
