= Museum of the Moscow Railway (Moscow Rizhsky station) =

Railway museum in Moscow, Russia

Coordinates: 55.79402°N 37.63234°E

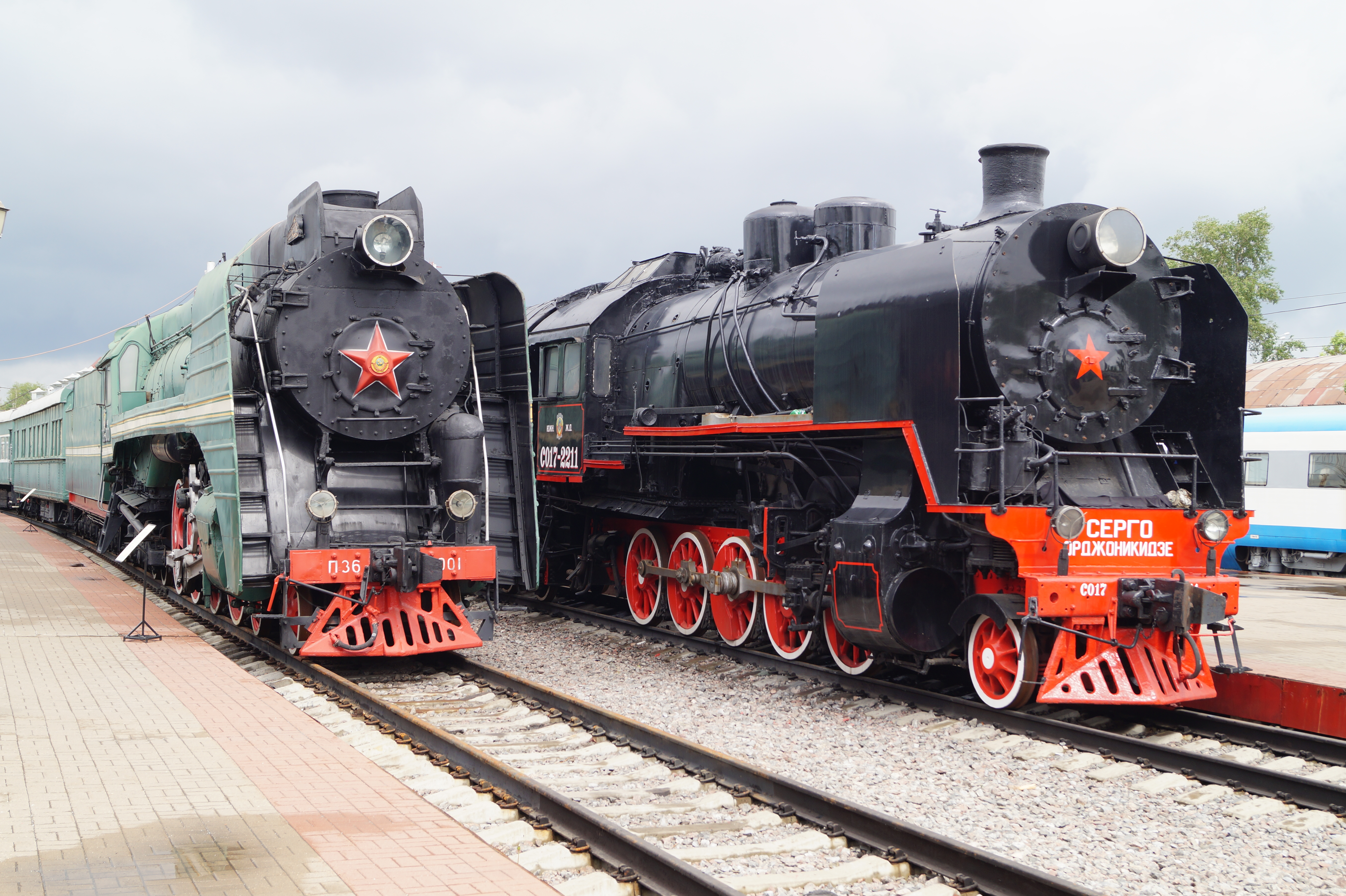
Two steam locomotives

The Museum of the Moscow Railway at Rizhsky station in Moscow (Russian: Музеи Московской железной дороги: Экспозиционная площадка натурной железнодорожной техники музея истории Московской железной дороги) is an open-air exhibition of rolling stock near the Moscow Rizhsky railway station in Moscow.

== Collection ==
The following repainted rail vehicles are exhibited:

Number	Photo	Type	Driver diameter	Max. speed	Power	Length	Weight	Coal/ fuel	Water
0.в 841		0-8-0	1220 mm	55 km/h	600PS	18.7 m	52.5 t	16 t	23 m^{3}
П36-0001		4-8-4	1850 mm	125 km/h	3000PS	29.9 m	74.0 t	24 t	50 m^{3}
ФД 21-3125		2-10-0	1500 mm	85 km/h	3200PS	29.0 m	135.0 t	25 t	44 m^{3}
СО17-2211		2-10-0	1320 mm	75 km/h	2000PS	21.6 m	97.0 t	18 t	23 m^{3}
ТЭ-5415		2-10-0	1420 mm	80 km/h	1400PS	22.9 m	86.0 t	13 t	30 m^{3}
Ед-2450		2-10-0	1320 mm	75 km/h	2080PS	22.2 m	100.4 t	18 t	28 m^{3}
П-0001		2-10-0	1500 mm	80 km/h	2125PS	24.0 m	90.0 t	18 t	29 m^{3}
Л-2342		2-10-0	1500 mm	80 km/h	2100PS	23.7 m	102.1 t	18 t	28 m^{3}
Эр 766-11		0-10-0	1320 mm	65 km/h	1400PS	21.95 m	85.8 t	18 t	27 m^{3}
9Р 17347		0-6-0	1050 mm	35 km/h	320PS	9.75 m	55.2 t	2.2 t	6.5 m^{3}
ЛВ 0441									
Эм 740-57		0-10-0	1320 mm	65 km/h	1400PS	20.5 m	82.0 t	16 t	23 m^{3}
ТЭ1-20-195		3o-3o		93 km/h	800PS	16.9 m	123.9 t	5.15 t	
ТЭ2-125		2o-2o		93 km/h	1000PS	11.9 m	85 t	3.5 t	
ТЭ3-5151		2(3o-3o)		100 km/h	2x2000-4000PS	33.95 m	252 t	2x 5.44 t	
2ТЭ10Л-3621		2(3o-3o)		100 km/h	2x 3000PS	2x 16.96 m	2x 128 t	2x 6.3 t	
ТЭП10-186		3o-3o		140 km/h	3000PS	18.61 m	129 t	5.0 t	
ТЭ7-080		2(3o-3o)		140 km/h	2x 2000PS	33.9 m	2x 126 t	2x 5.44 t	
ТЭП60-1200		(3o-3o)		160 km/h	3000PS	19.25 m	126 t	6.4 t	
2ТЭ10м-0501		2(3o-3o)		100 km/h	2x 3000PS	33.94 m	176 t	2x 6.3 t	
ЧМЭ2-120		2o-2o		80 km/h	750PS	13.26 m	74 t	3.0 t	
ТЭМ2-1592		2o-2o		100 km/h	1200PS	16.97 m	120 t	5.44 t	
ВЛ22-м-2026		3o-3o		75 km/h	3000 V	16.39 m	132 t		
ВЛ8-1694		2(3o-3o)		100 km/h	3000 V	27.52 m	184 t		
ВЛ23-131		3o-3o		100 km/h	3000 V	17.02 m	138 t		
ВЛ10-098		2(2o-2o)		100 km/h	3000 V	32.8 m	184 t		
ЧС3-045		3o-3o		120 km/h	3000 V	17.02 m	138 t		
ЧС4-025		3o-3o		160 km/h	25000 V	19.98 m	123 t		
Д1-538		2x3+2o		120 km/h	1000PS	2x 24.5 m	70.5 t (Motor car)		
ЭЗ9п-132				130 km/h	25000 V	2x 19.6 m	60.0 t (Motor car)		
ЭР200-1									
ЭР200-105									
Ср³-21775									
ЭР-22.38									

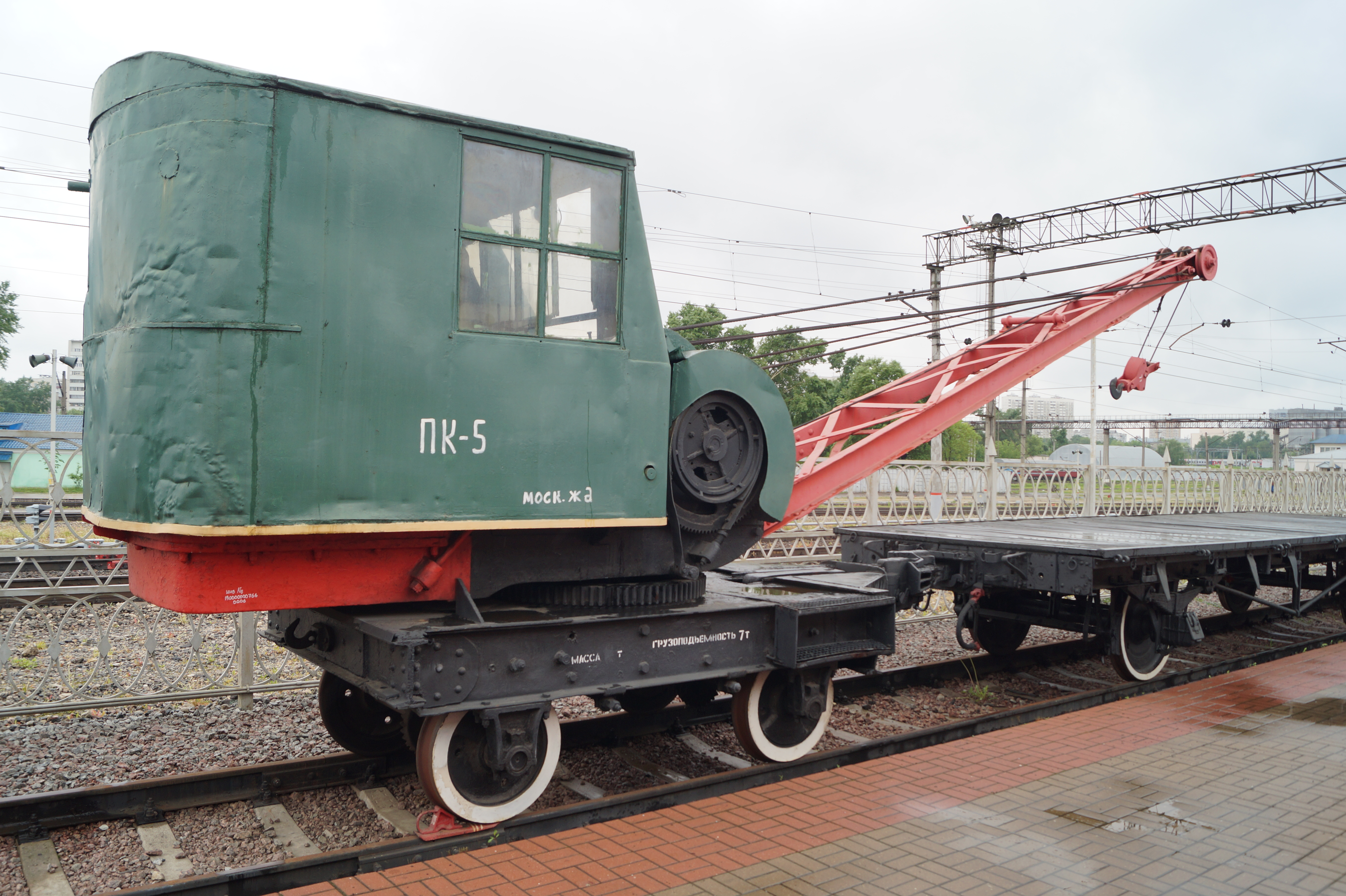
Crane

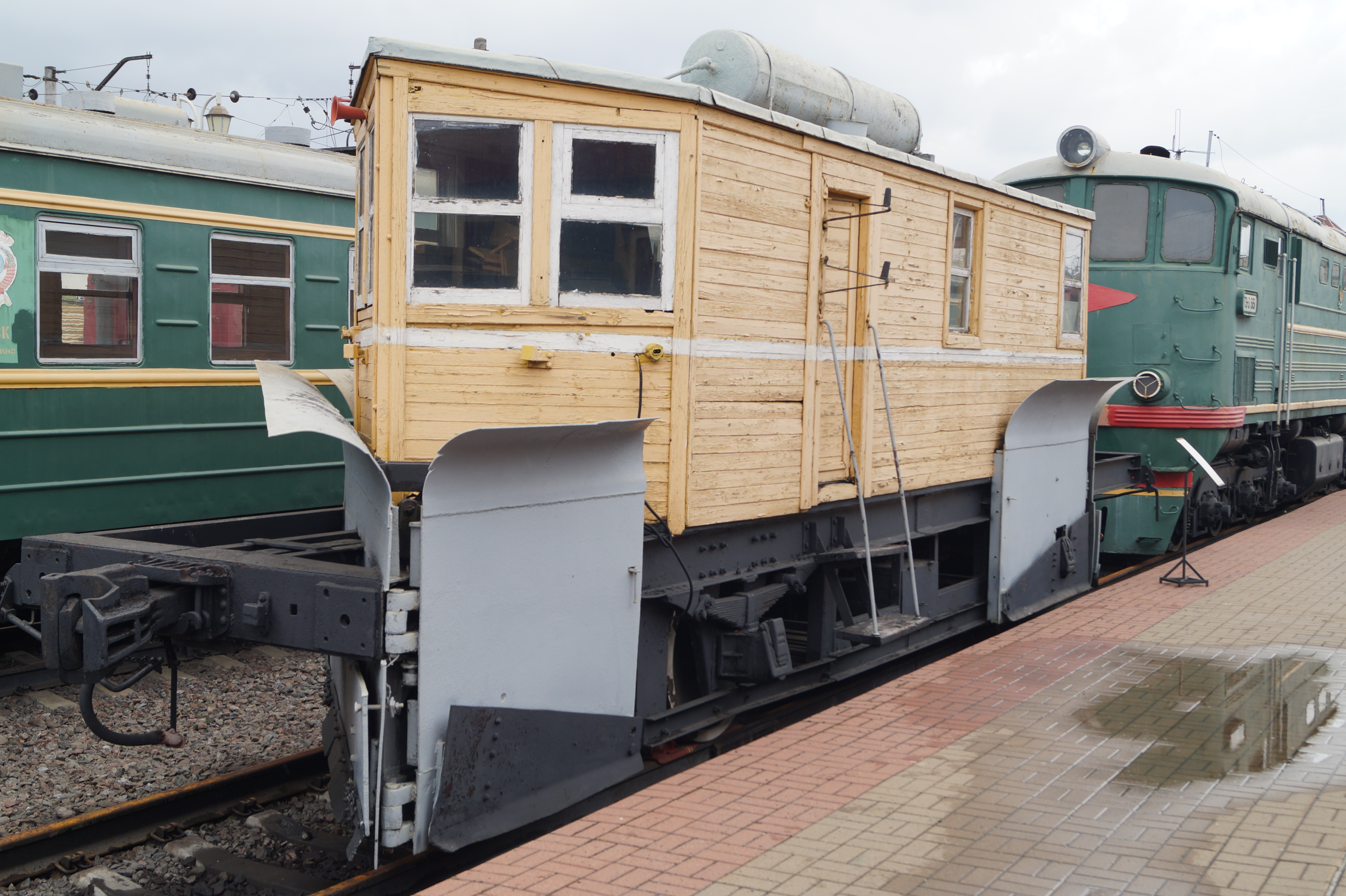
Snow plow

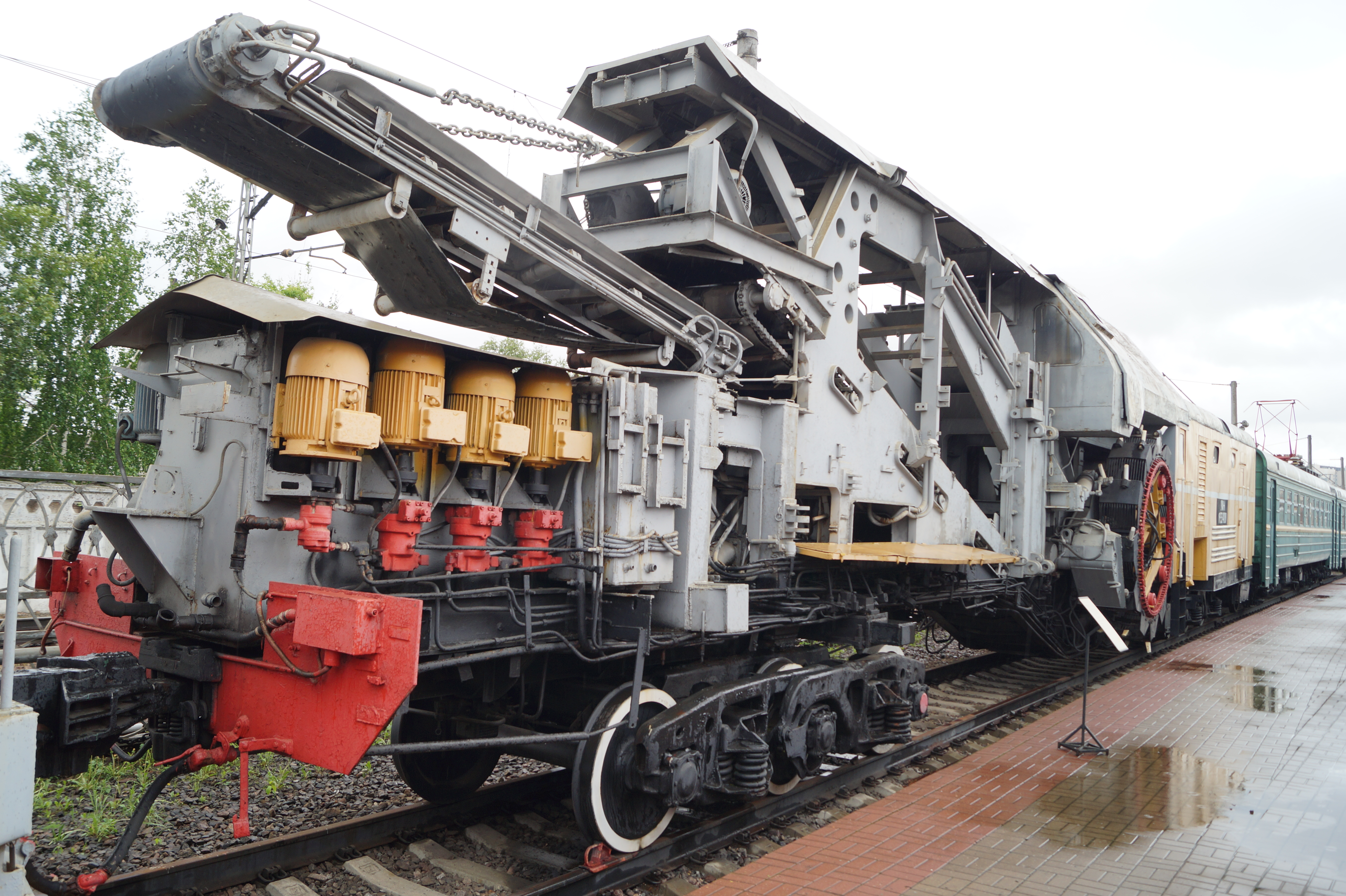
Ballast cleaner

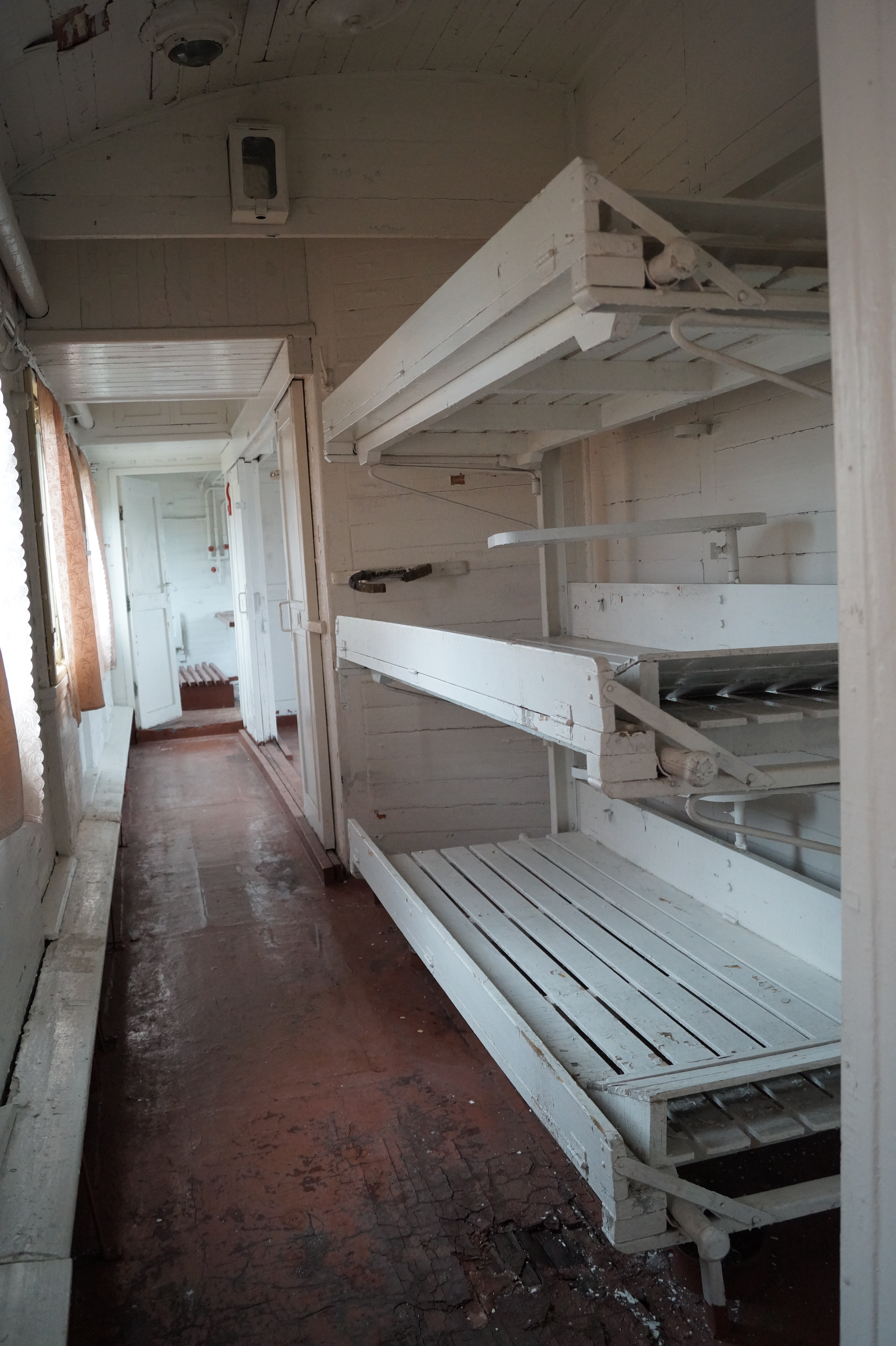
Hospital car

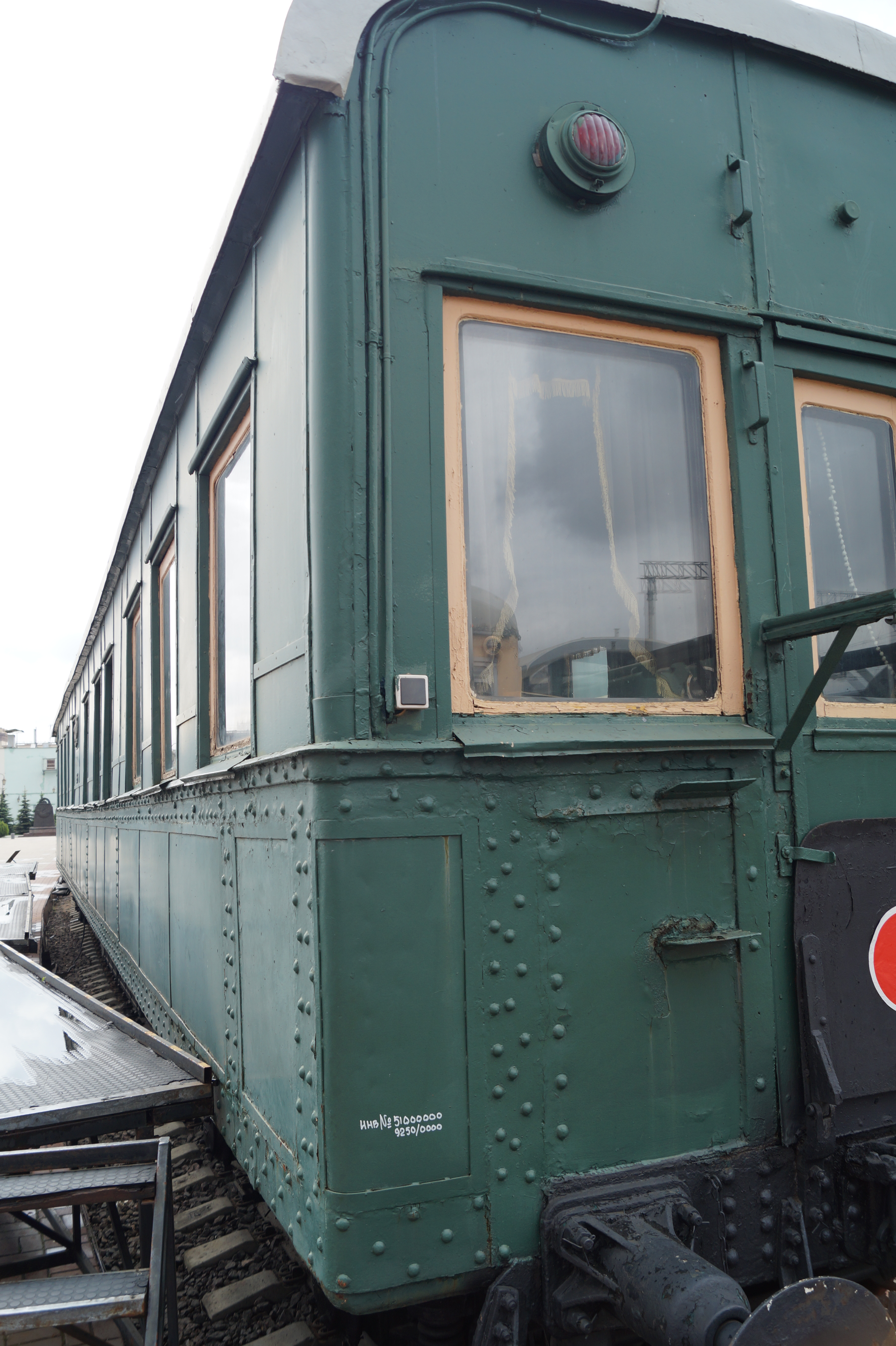
Passenger car

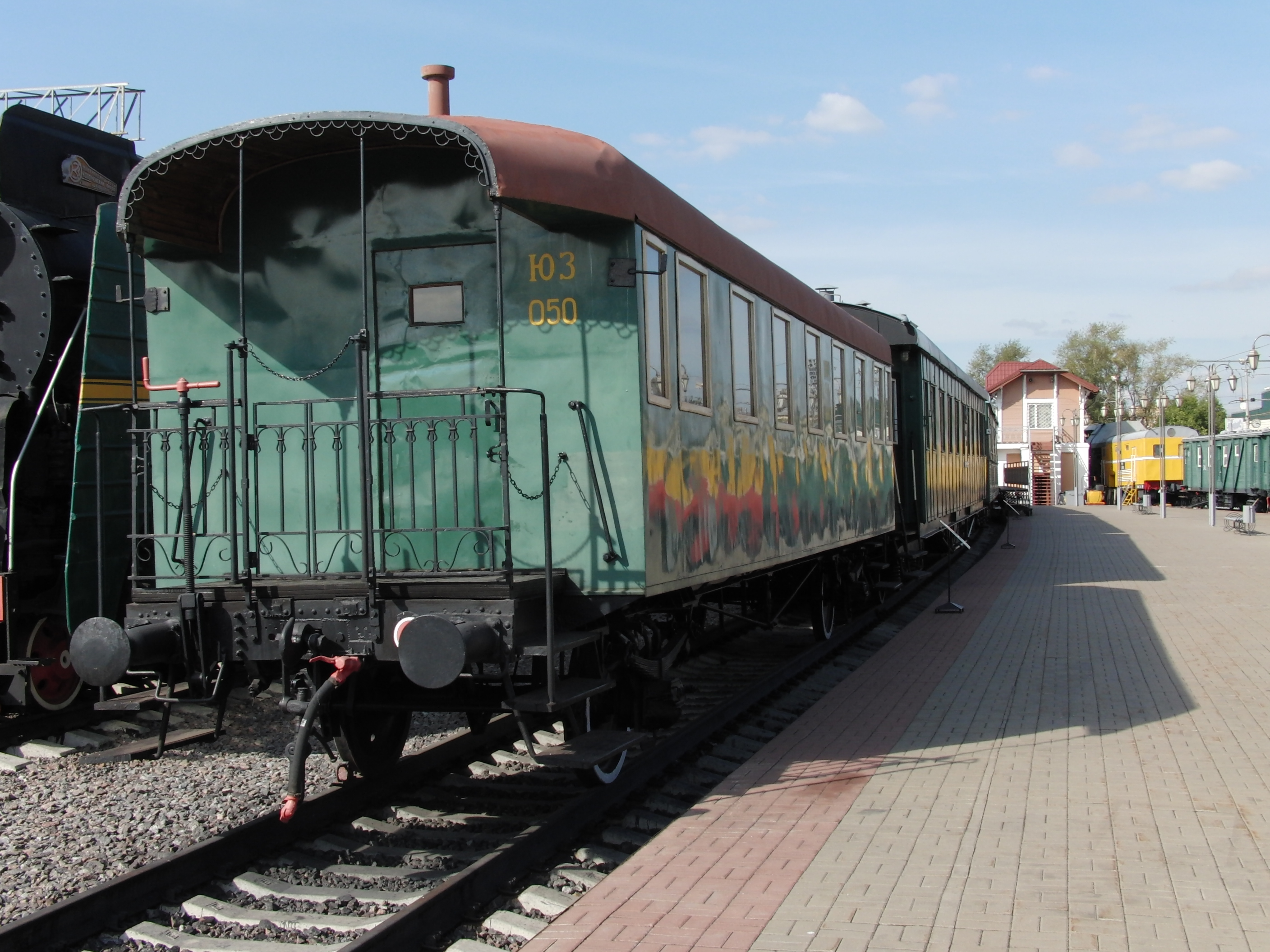
Sleeping car

== See also ==
- Museum of the Moscow Railway (Paveletskaya station)
