= Russian locomotive class O =

Russian steam locomotive class

O class steam locomotive
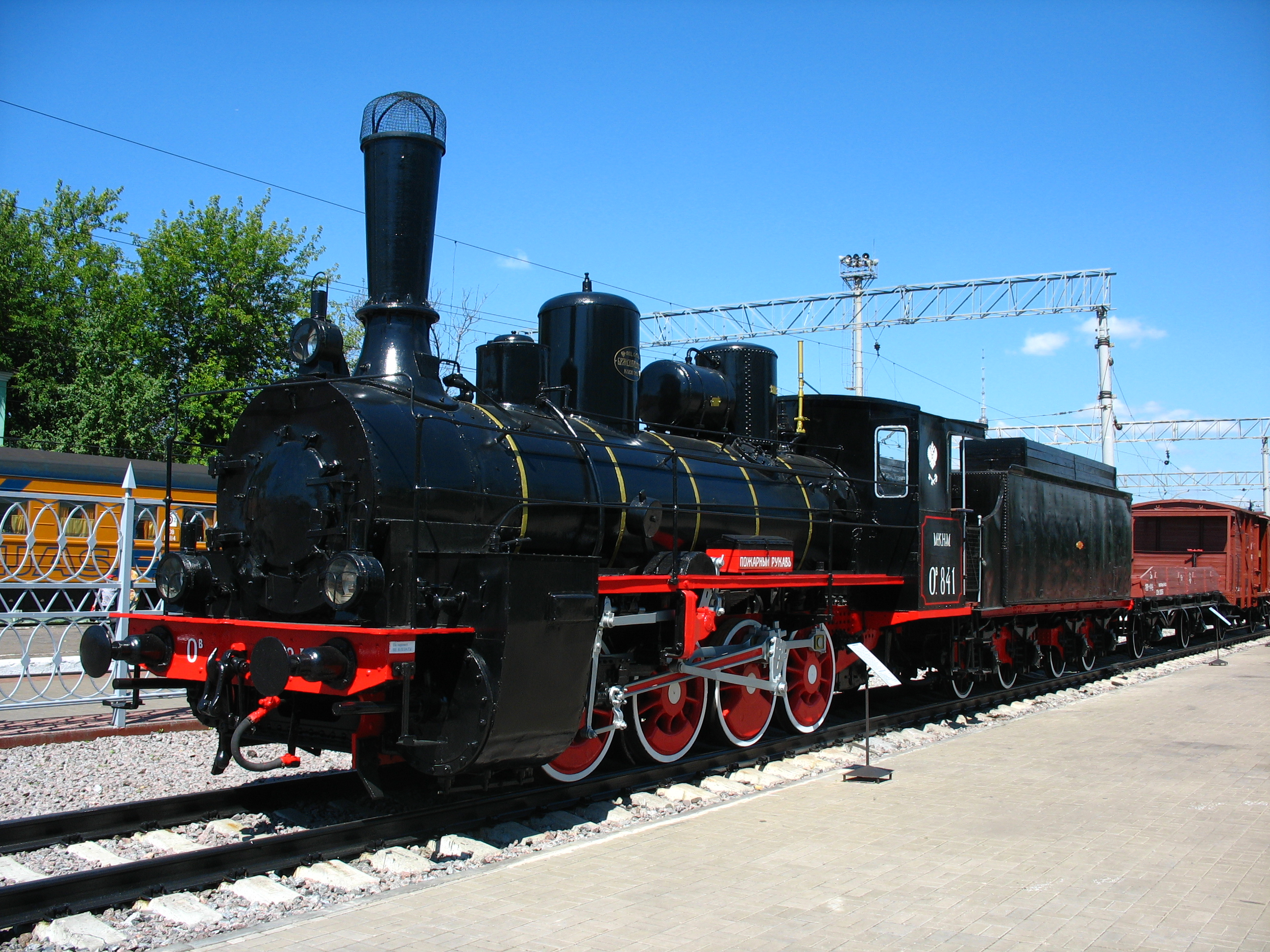
- Preserved steam locomotive Ov-841 at the Moscow Railway museum, Rizhsky Rail Terminal
Type and origin
- Power type: Steam
- Builder: Putilov Factory, Krasnoye Sormovo, Kharkiv Locomotive Plant
- Build date: 1890–1915, 1925–1928
- Total produced: 9,129
Specifications
- Configuration
  - Whyte: 0-8-0
- Gauge: 1,524 mm (5 ft)
- Driver dia.: 1,200 mm (47.24 in)
- Length: 9.672 m (31 ft 8 3/4 in), w/o tender
- Loco weight: Engine only: 52 to 55 long tons (53 to 56 t; 58 to 62 short tons)
- Fuel type: Coal
- Firebox
  - Grate area: 1.85 m^{2} (19.9 sq ft)
- Boiler pressure: Various, from: 11 kgf/cm^{2} (1.08 MPa; 156 psi) to: 15 kgf/cm^{2} (1.47 MPa; 213 psi)
- Cylinders: Two, outside
- Cylinder size: Simple: 500 mm × 650 mm (19.69 in × 25.59 in); Compound: hp: 500 mm × 650 mm (19.69 in × 25.59 in) lp: 730 mm × 650 mm (28.74 in × 25.59 in)
Career
- Operators: Russian Railways China Eastern Railway
- Class: О
- Number in class: 9,129
- Delivered: 1890
- Retired: USSR: 1964 China: 1952

The Russian locomotive class O (from Russian: Основной) was an early type of Russian steam locomotives. 9,129 locomotives were built between 1890 and 1928; hence it was the second most numerous class of locomotive in Russia, after E class, which was a unique number even on the international level.

== Variants ==
Basic variants were early O^{d} and O^{D} (Russian: О^{д}, O^{Д}) with Joy valve gear and most numerous later O^{V} (O^{В}) with Walschaerts valve gear. Some locomotives were built as two cylinder simple expansion and others as two cylinder compounds.

== Armoured locomotives ==
During World War I, the Russian Civil War and the Eastern Front of World War II O-class locomotives were widely used as standard armoured locomotives in armoured trains due to rugged construction and low silhouette. Relatively lightweight, these locomotives could carry more armor without overloading the track.

== Gallery ==
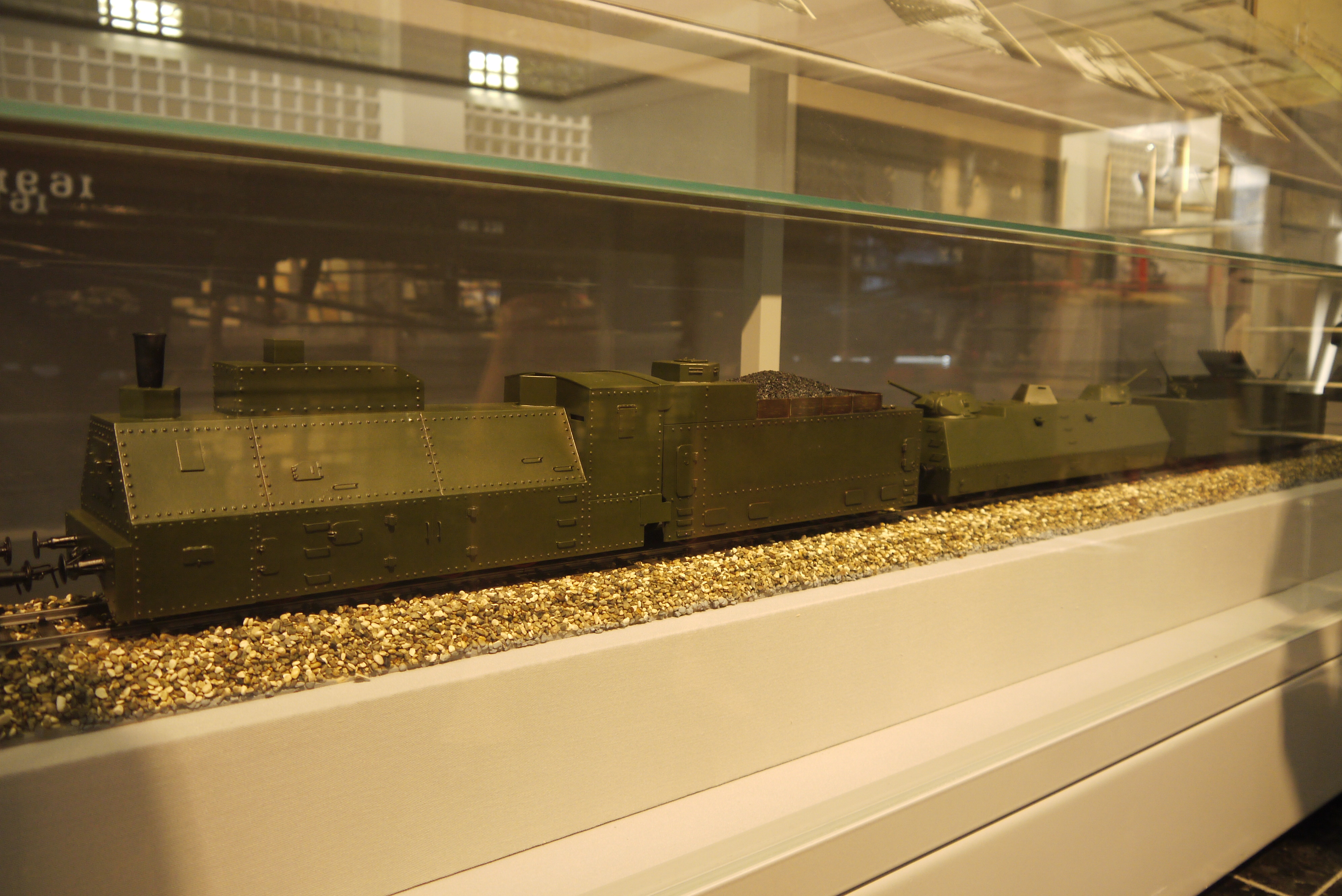
A model of a Soviet Armoured train in the Museum of the Moscow Railway at Paveletsky Rail Terminal in Moscow. It composes one Armoured Russian Locomotive Class O.

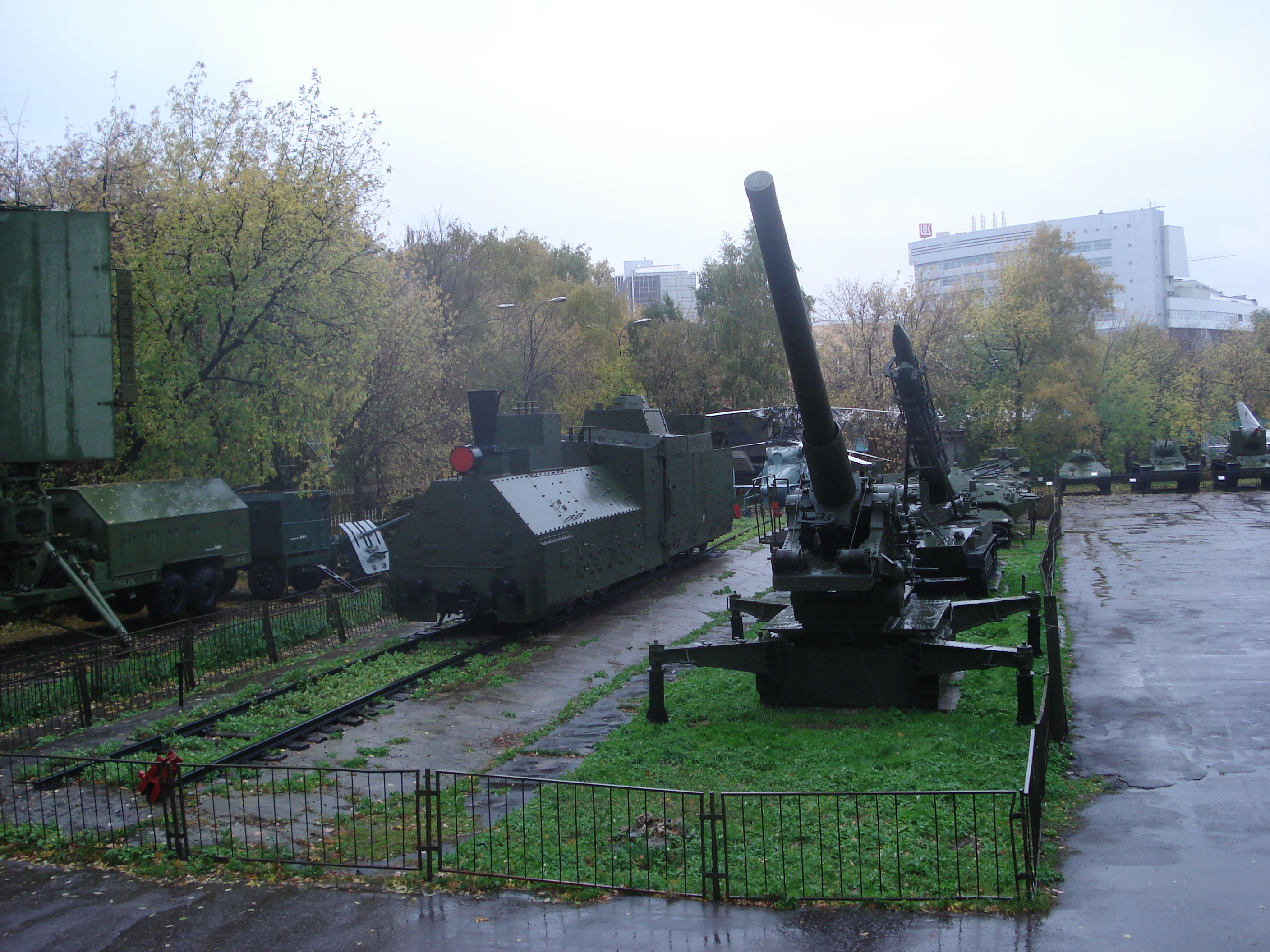
0-8-0 Armoured locomotive Ov 5067 at the Central Armed Forces Museum, Moscow

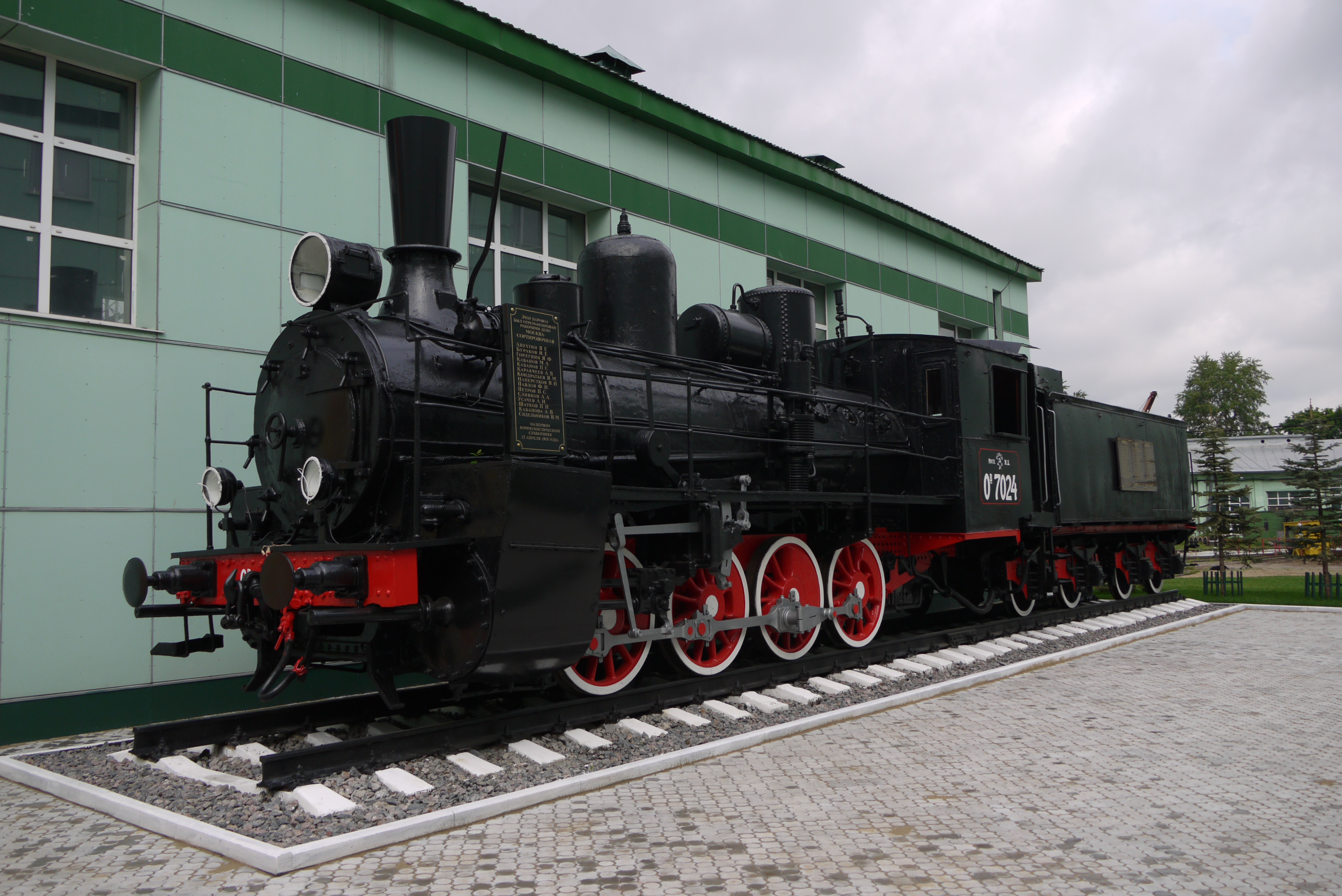
Ov 7024 Moskva-Ryazanskaya, Sortirovochnaya depot, Moscow, an 0-8-0

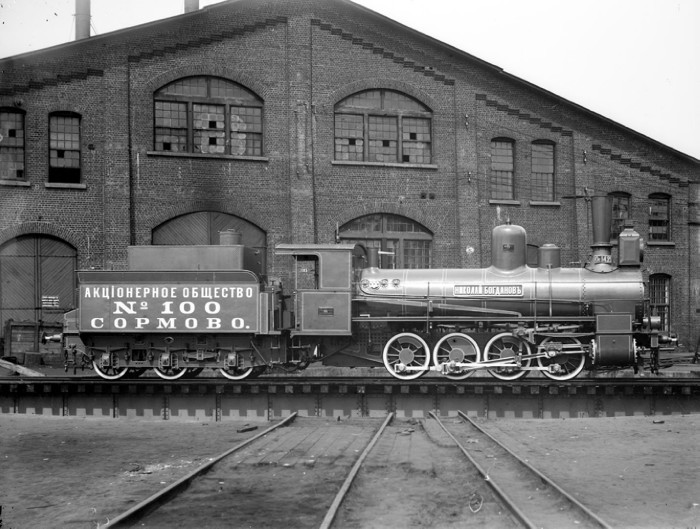
Locomotive OD class the 100th manufactured at Krasnoye Sormovo in 1899

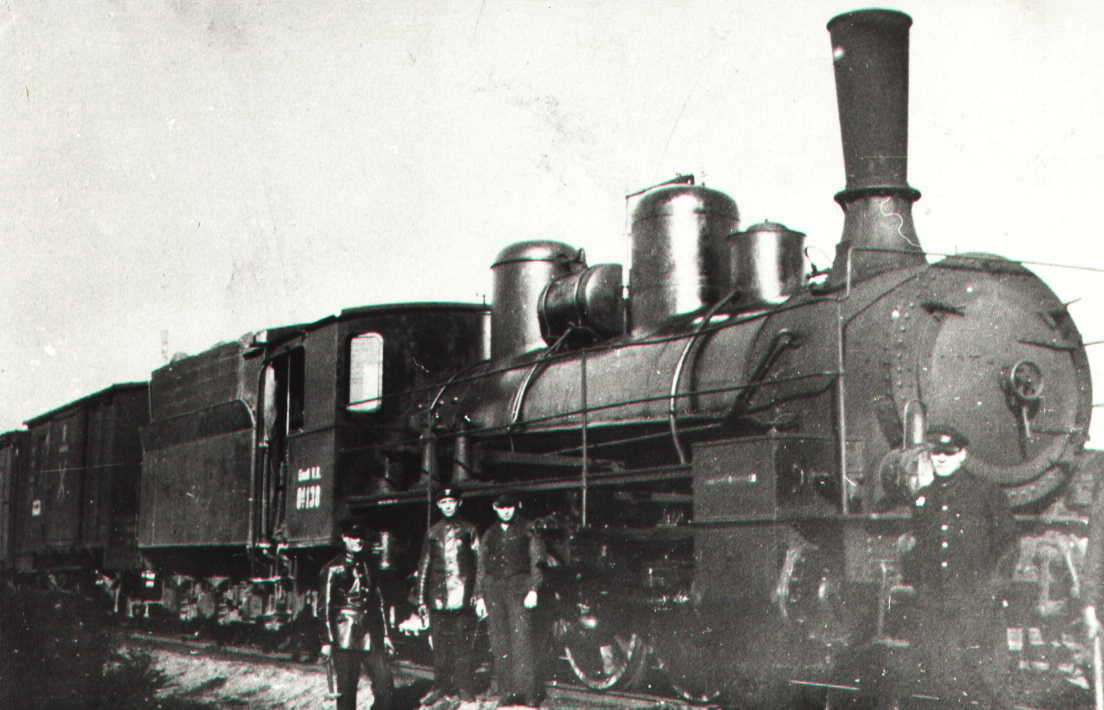
Steam locomotive Ok (Od) on the Estonian Railway circa 1920

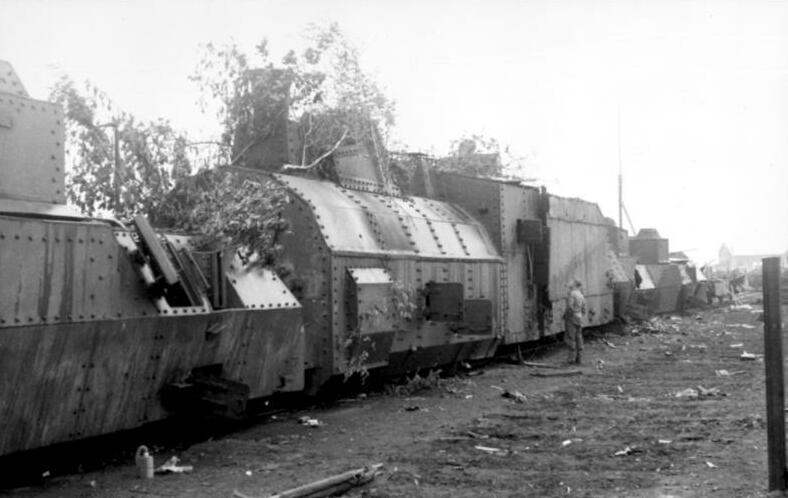
Soviet armoured train No.2 "Yuzhnouralskiy Zheleznodorozhnik" (South-Ural Railroad Man), of 38th Armoured Train Unit, Briansk front, abandoned at Marmyzhi 29 June 1942 (OB-3 type)

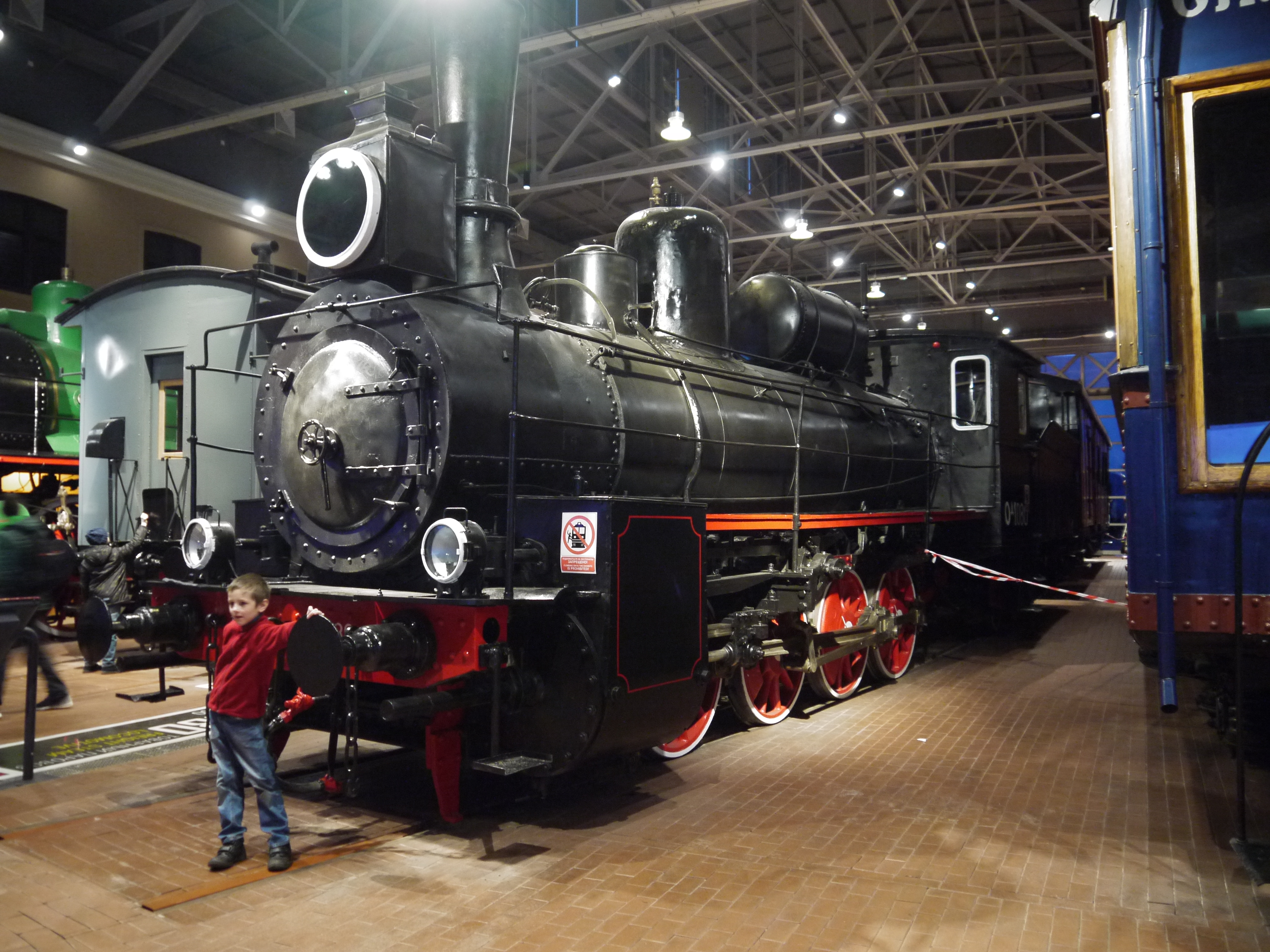
Od-1080 at the Russian Railway Museum, Saint Petersburg

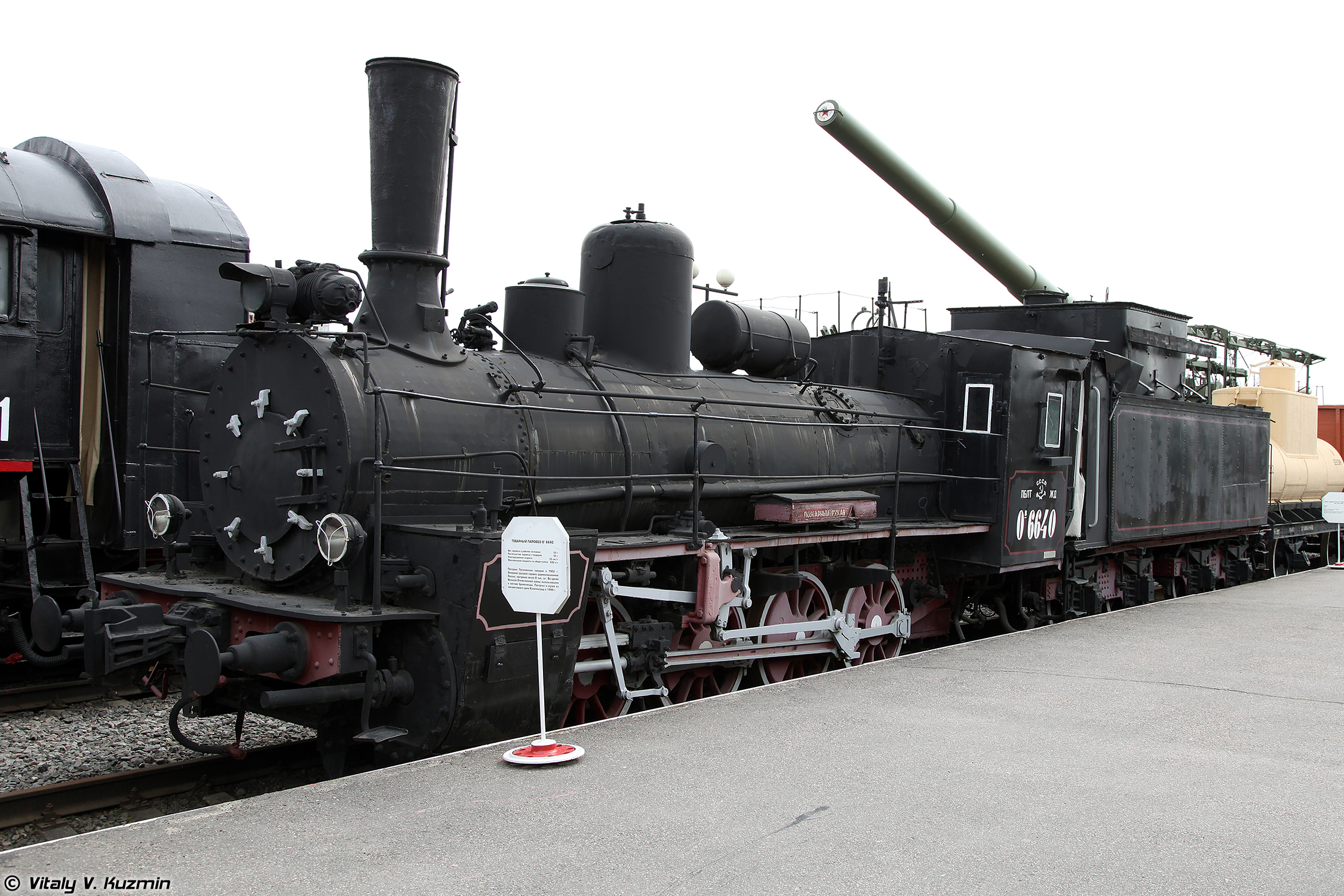
Ov 6640 at Varshavsky Rail Terminal, St. Petersburg

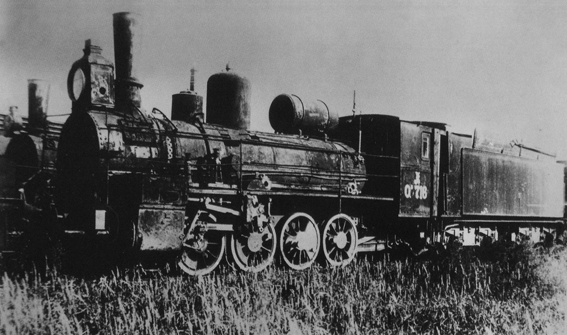
Od 716 of Chinese Eastern Railway

== See also ==
- The Museum of the Moscow Railway, at Paveletsky Rail Terminal, Moscow
- Rizhsky Rail Terminal, Moscow, Home of the Moscow Railway Museum
- Russian Railway Museum, Saint Petersburg
- Finland Station, St.Petersburg
- History of rail transport in Russia
