= O-class submarine =

O-class submarine may refer to:

- United States O-class submarine
- Oberon-class submarine
- Odin-class submarine
- Several early submarine classes of the Royal Netherlands Navy:
  O 1-class submarine consisting only HNLMS O 1
  O 2-class submarine
  O 6-class submarine consisting only HNLMS O 6
  O 7-class submarine consisting only HNLMS O 7
  O 9-class submarine
  O 12-class submarine
  O 16-class submarine consisting only HNLMS O 16
  O 19-class submarine
  O 21-class submarine
