= South Australian Railways O class (first) =

Class of Australian locomotives

South Australian Railways O class (1st)
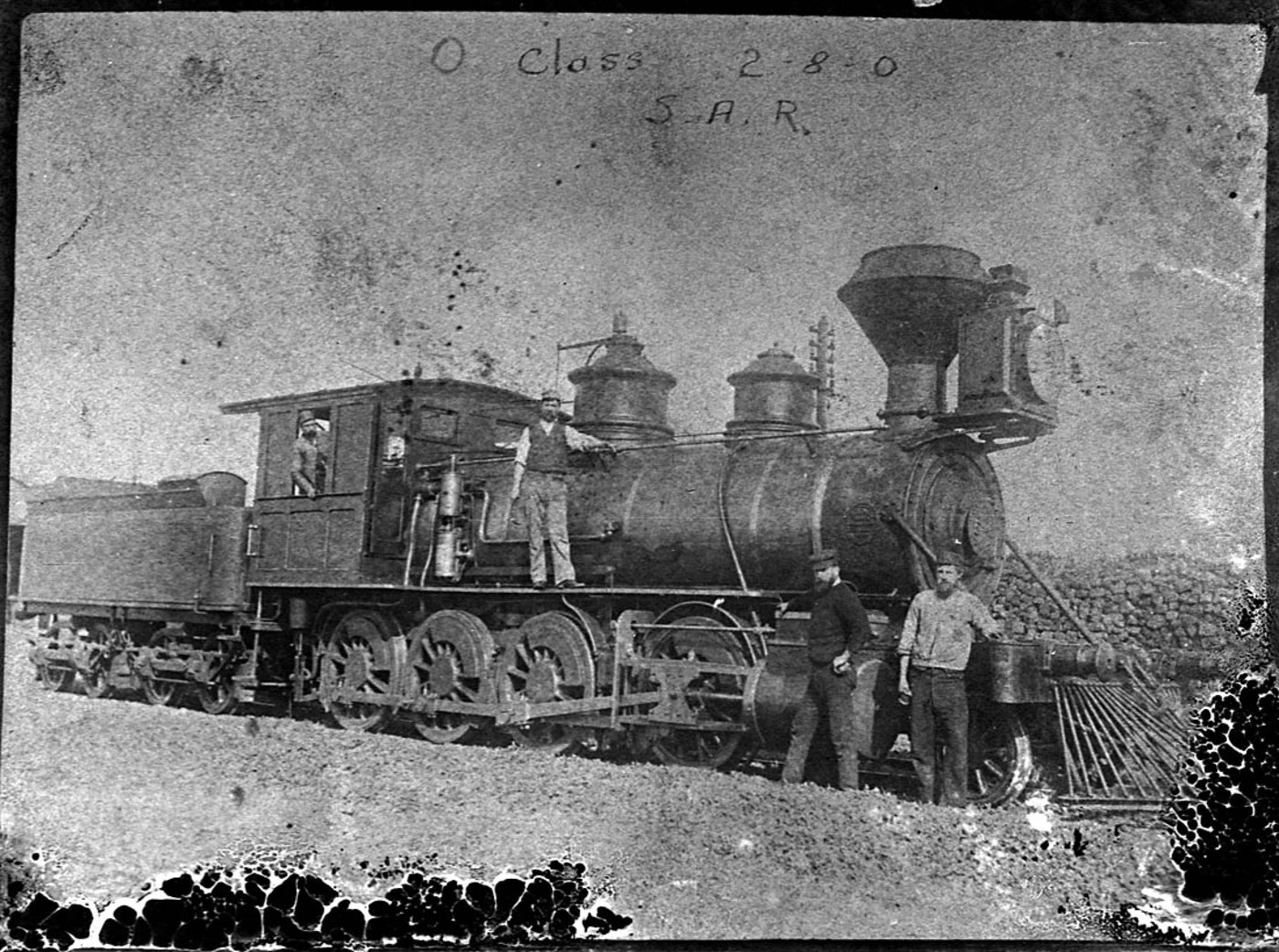
- SLNSW 28752 South Australian Railways O class steam locomotive c. 1870
Type and origin
- Power type: Steam
- Builder: Baldwin Locomotive Works
- Serial number: 5227 & 5228
- Build date: 1880
- Total produced: 2
Specifications
- Configuration
  - Whyte: 2-8-0
  - UIC: 1'D 2'2'
- Gauge: 5 ft 3 in (1,600 mm)
- Driver dia.: 4 ft 0 in (1,219 mm)
- Length: 53 ft 5 1/4 in (16.29 m)
- Total weight: 77 long tons 1 cwt (172,600 lb or 78.3 t)
- Fuel type: Coal
- Fuel capacity: 6 long tons 1 cwt 1 qr (13,580 lb or 6.16 t)
- Water cap.: 2,800 imp gal (3,400 US gal; 13,000 L)
- Boiler pressure: 130 psi (900 kPa)
- Heating surface: 1,184 sq ft (110.0 m^{2})
- Cylinders: 2
- Cylinder size: 20 in × 24 in (508 mm × 610 mm)
Performance figures
- Tractive effort: 22,100 lbf (98 kN)
Career
- Class: O
- Number in class: 2
- Numbers: 54 & 55
- First run: 25.2.1881
- Withdrawn: 1904
- Scrapped: 1904
- Disposition: Both scrapped

The South Australian Railways O class (1st) locomotives were built by Baldwin Locomotive Works for the South Australian Railways (SAR). They entered service in 1881 on the SAR system and were both withdrawn and scrapped by 1904.

== History ==
Their main job was hauling goods trains on the Intercolonial Railway. When they were first in service they became the largest locomotives on the SAR system. They were unsuccessful on the Adelaide Hills line and were later diverted to work on the Northern line. With the great success of the new 4-6-0 R class locomotives that arrived in 1886, the two O class locomotives were withdrawn from service and scrapped in 1904, with a relatively short working life of 23 years.
