= South Australian Railways O class (second) =

Class of Australian locomotives

South Australian Railways O class (2nd)
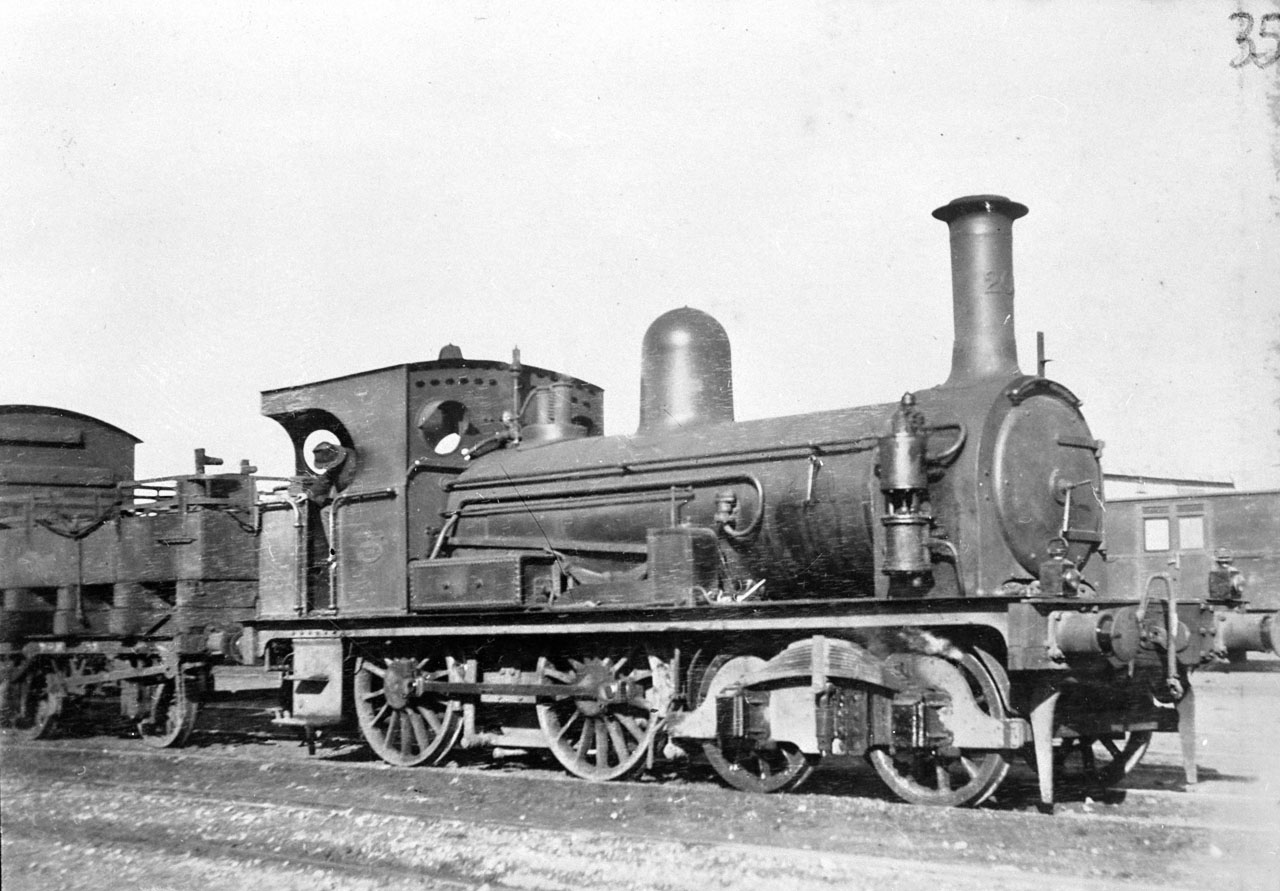
- South Australian Railways O class (2nd) No. 204
Type and origin
- Power type: Steam
- Builder: Robert Stephenson and Company
- Build date: 1868
- Total produced: 1
- Rebuilder: Islington Railway Workshops
- Number rebuilt: 1
Specifications
- Configuration
  - Whyte: 4-4-0WT
  - UIC: 2'B T
- Gauge: 5 ft 3 in (1,600 mm)
- Driver dia.: 4 ft 6 in (1,372 mm)
- Length: 29 ft 4 in (8,941 mm)
- Axle load: 13 long tons 7 cwt (29,900 lb or 13.6 t)
- Loco weight: 37 long tons 14 cwt (84,400 lb or 38.3 t)
- Fuel type: Coal
- Fuel capacity: 0 long tons 16 cwt (1,800 lb or 0.8 t)
- Water cap.: 350 imp gal (420 US gal; 1,600 L)
- Firebox
  - Grate area: 16.07 sq ft (1.493 m^{2})
- Boiler pressure: 130 psi (900 kPa)
- Heating surface
  - Firebox: 89.2 sq ft (8.29 m^{2})
  - Tubes: 1,032.8 sq ft (95.95 m^{2})
- Cylinders: 2
- Cylinder size: 16 1/2 in × 24 in (419 mm × 610 mm)
Performance figures
- Tractive effort: 13,371 lbf (59.48 kN)
Career
- Operators: South Australian Railways
- Class: O
- Number in class: 1
- Withdrawn: 1929
- Disposition: Scrapped 1930

The South Australian Railways O class (2nd) locomotive was a 4-4-0WT built by Robert Stephenson and Company in 1868 for the Launceston and Western Railway Company (now known as the Western Line). It entered service with the South Australian Railways in 1912 and was cut up in 1930.

== History ==
The Launceston and Western Railway opened in 1871 and had a track gauge of 5 ft 3 in (1,600 mm). This locomotive (No. 1) was in service with another 4-4-0 tank engine for the opening of the line on 10 February 1871. When the Tasmanian Government took over the line in October 1873, this locomotive became a member of their A class. In 1885 the line was converted to 3 ft 6 in (1,067 mm) and the four A class locomotives became redundant. In 1888, No. 1 was sold to a private company in Victoria for use between mines at Woolamai and a jetty at Queensferry. Shortly after, it was put into storage until 1910. It was then sold to Smith and Timms for use on the construction of the railway line to Angaston from Gawler in South Australia. The side tanks were removed, which left the locomotive with only a small tank. It was supplemented with a small four wheeled tank which was coupled to the engine.

Once construction was completed on the Gawler to Angaston line, the contractors sold locomotive No. 1 to the South Australian Railways in February 1912 as No. 204. No. 204 eventually became classed as the second O on the SAR network between 1918 and 1919. The O classes' service on the SAR mainly consisted of shunting at Mile End and Port Adelaide, during which it got a boiler from a Q class locomotive via a rebuild at Islington Railway Workshops.
