= Kursky suburban railway line =

Railway line in Russia

Kursky Suburban Railway

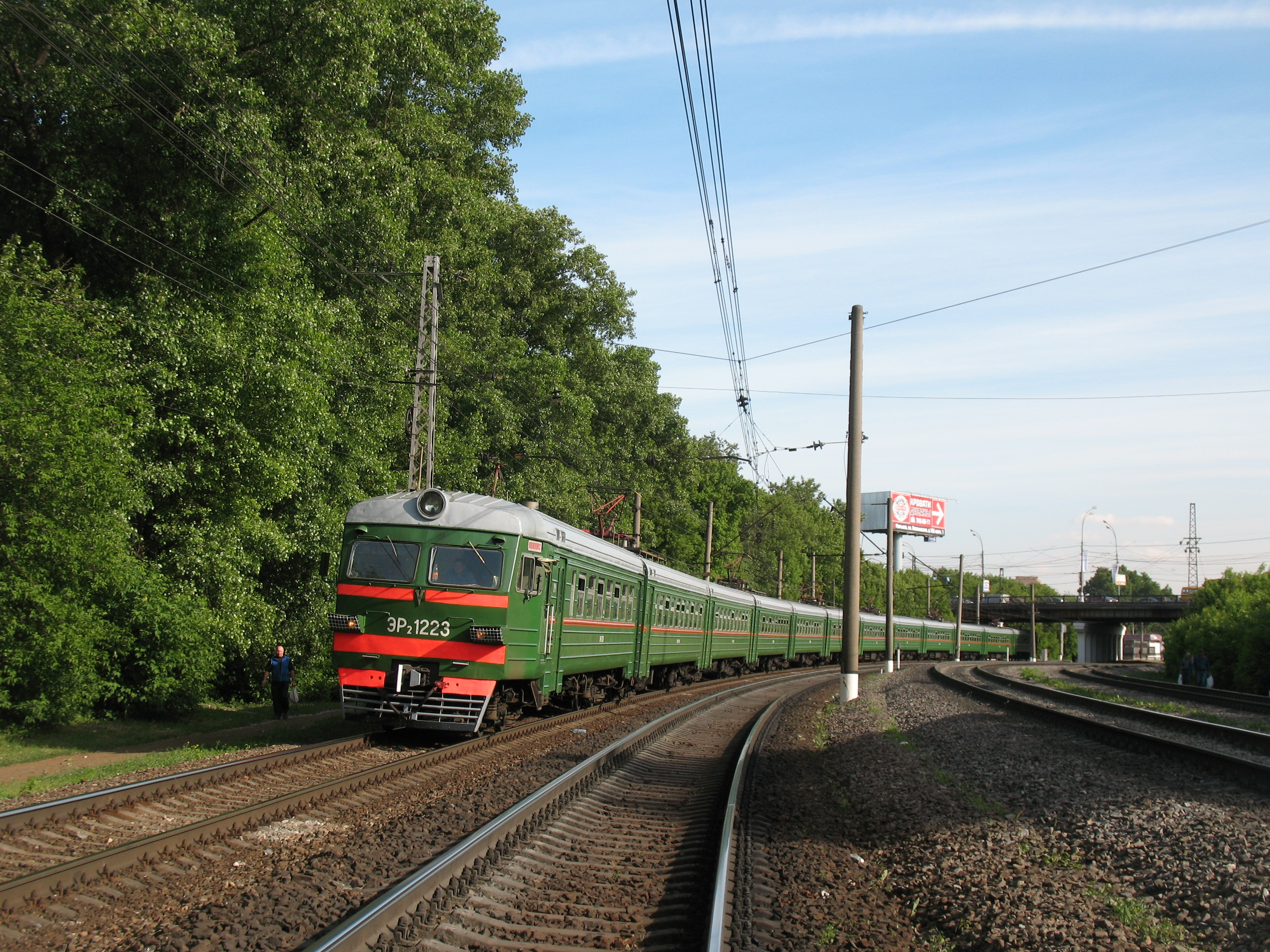

Overview
- Native name: Курское направление Московской железной дороги
- Owner: Central Suburban Passenger Company; Russian Railways
- Locale: Moscow and Moscow Oblast
- Termini: Moscow Kursky; Tula I
- Stations: 50

Service
- Type: Commuter rail
- System: Moscow Railway
- Operator(s): Russian Railways

History
- Opened: 1866

Technical
- Track gauge: 1,520 mm (4 ft 11 27/32 in) Russian gauge
- Electrification: 3 kV DC overhead line

The Kursky suburban railway line (Russian: Курское направление Московской железной дороги) is one of eleven railway lines used for suburban railway connections between Moscow, Russia, and surrounding areas, mostly in Moscow Oblast. The Kursky suburban railway line connects Moscow with the stations in the south, in particular, with the towns of Podolsk, Chekhov, Serpukhov, Yasnogorsk, and Tula. The stations the line serves are located in Moscow, as well as in Podolsk, Chekhov, and Serpukhov in Moscow Oblast, as well as in Zaoksky and Yasnogorsky Districts and the city of Tula in Tula Oblast. Some of the suburban trains have their northern terminus at Moscow Kursky railway station in Moscow, others commute from the Rizhsky suburban railway line. In the southern direction, the suburban trains terminate at Krasny Stroitel, Shcherbinka, Podolsk, Lvovskaya, Chekhov, Serpukhov, and Tula I. The line is operated by Moscow Railway. The tracks between Moscow Kursky railway station and Podolsk are also used by Line D2, one of the Moscow Central Diameters.

The suburban railway line follows the railway which connects Moscow with Kursk and Belgorod and further with Kharkiv. It is electrified and has two tracks everywhere between Moscow and the Ukrainian border. The distance between Kursky railway station and Tula I is 194 kilometres (121 mi).

== History ==
The railway connecting Moscow and Serpukhov was opened in 1866 for passenger traffic and in 1867 for cargo traffic. In 1867, it was extended to Tula and eventually to Kursk, and was first known as Moscow — Kursk railway. The section between Moscow and Tsaritsyno was electrified in 1938, and the electrification was extended to Podolsk in 1939. It was further extended to Lvovskaya in 1947, Serpukhov in 1953, and Tula and further to Skuratovo in 1957.

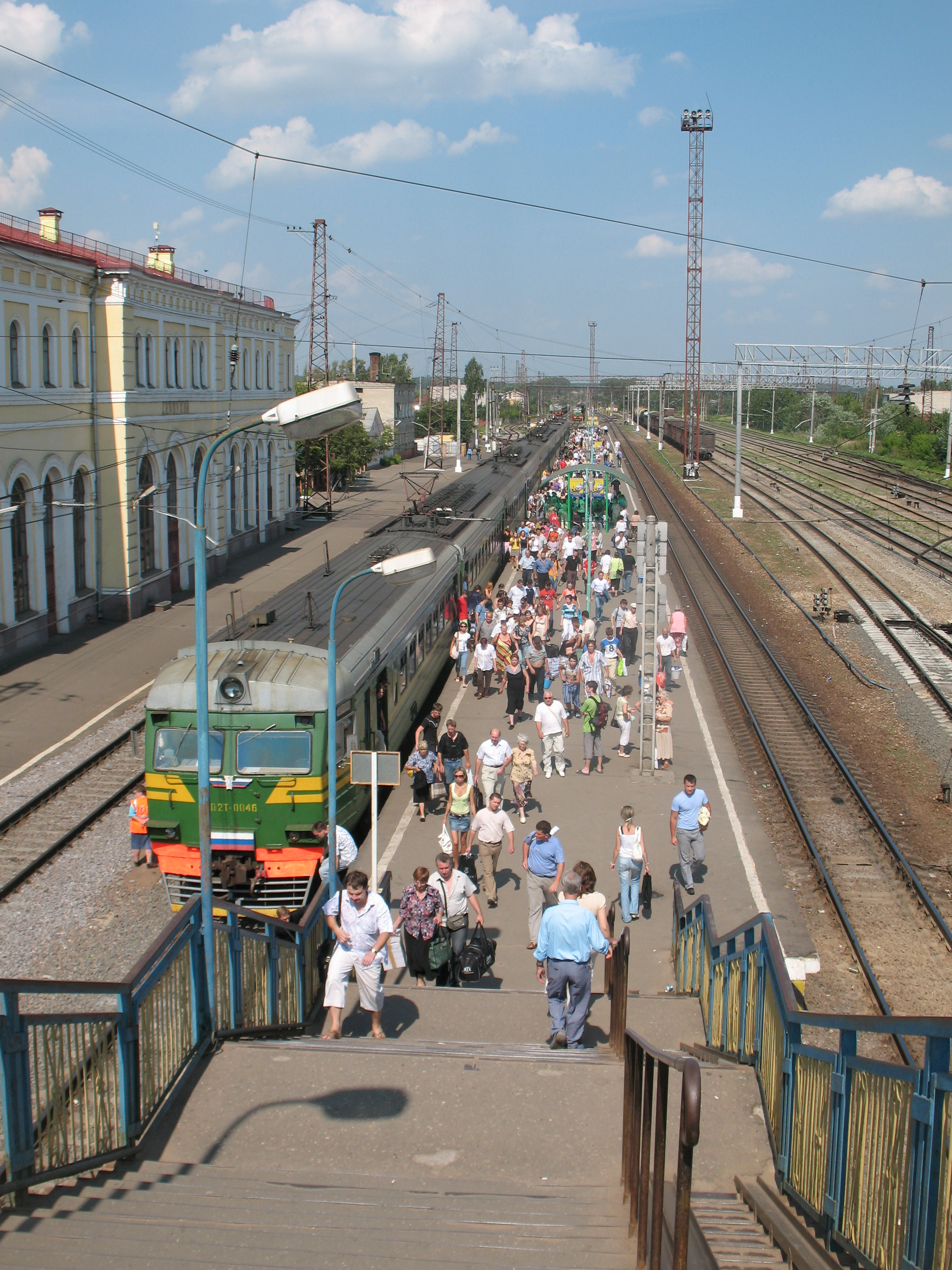
EMU from Moscow arrived to big station Sepkukhov (2007)

On 21 November 2019 Moscow Central Diameters started operation. Simultaneously, a direct connection to the Belorussky suburban railway line was closed for passenger traffic.

== Stations ==
Following the standard notations in Russia, a railway stop below is called a station if it is a terminus or if it has a cargo terminal, and it is called a platform otherwise.

1. Moscow Kursky railway station (station), transfer to Kurskaya metro station of Arbatsko–Pokrovskaya line, Kurskaya metro station of Koltsevaya line, and Chkalovskaya;
2. Moskva-Tovarnaya (station), transfer to Ploshchad Ilyicha metro station and Rimskaya metro station;
3. Kalitniki (platform);
4. Novokhokhlovskaya (platform), transfer to Novokhokhlovskaya Moscow Central Circle station;
5. Tekstilshchiki (platform), transfer to Tekstilshchiki metro station;
6. Kubanskaya (station);
7. Depo (platform);
8. Pererva (platform);
9. Kuryanovo (platform);
10. Moskvorechye (platform);
11. Tsaritsyno (station), transfer to Tsaritsyno metro station;
12. Pokrovskoe (platform);
13. Krasny Stroitel (station);
14. Bitsa (platform);
15. Butovo (station);
16. Shcherbinka (station);
17. Ostafyevo (platform);
18. Silikatnaya (platform);
19. Podolsk (station);
20. Kutuzovskaya (platform);
21. Vesennyaya (platform);
22. Grivno (station);
23. Lvovskaya (station);
24. Molodi (platform);
25. Stolbovaya (station), transfer to Greater Ring of the Moscow Railway;
26. 66 km (platform);
27. Chepelyovo (platform);
28. Chekhov (station);
29. Luch (platform);
30. Sharapova Okhota (station);
31. 92 km (platform);
32. Avangar (platform);
33. Serpukhov (station);
34. Oka (platform);
35. 107 km (platform);
36. Priokskaya (platform);
37. Romanovskiye Dachi (platform);
38. Tarusskaya (station);
39. 132 km (platform);
40. Pakhomovo (platform);
41. Shulgino (station);
42. 153 km (platform);
43. Yasnogorsk (station);
44. Shemetovo (platform);
45. Baranovo (platform);
46. Revyakino (station);
47. Baydiki (platform);
48. Khomyakovo (station);
49. 191 km (platform);
50. Tula I (station), connections to Oryol, Kaluga I, and Uzlovaya I.
