= Novokhokhlovskaya =

Novokhokhlovskaya may refer to:

- Novokhokhlovskaya (Moscow Central Circle), a railway station on the Moscow Central Circle
- Novokhokhlovskaya railway station, a railway station on the Moscow Central Diameters
