= Tsaritsyno railway station =

Railway station in Moscow

Tsaritsyno Царицыно
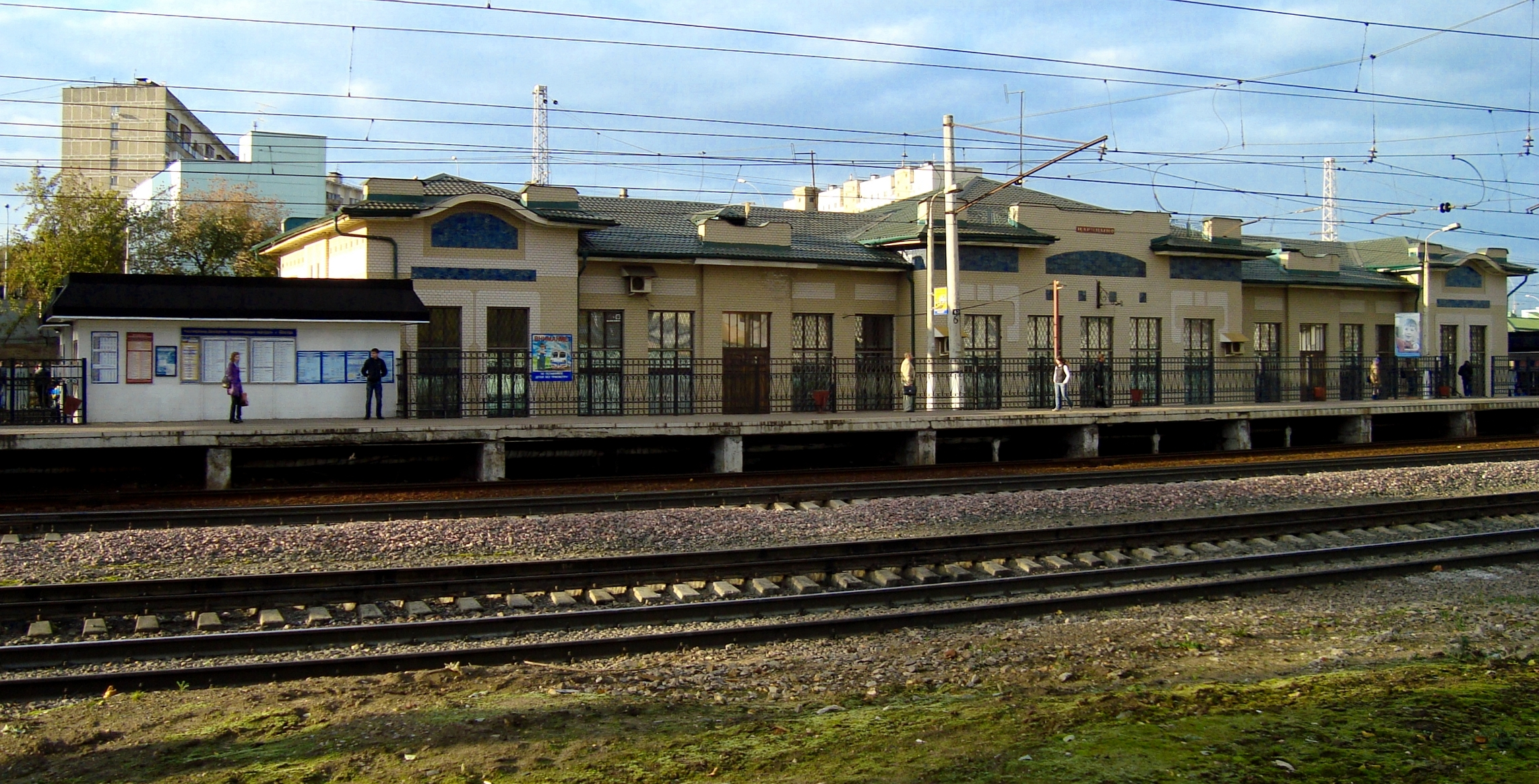

General information
- Location: Tsaritsyno District, Moscow; Russia
- Coordinates: 55.618472°N 37.668611°E
- System: Moscow Railway platform
- Owner: Russian Railways
- Operator: Moscow Railway
- Platforms: 4
- Connections: Tsaritsyno

Construction
- Structure type: At-grade

History
- Opened: 1865

Services
Preceding station	Moscow Railway (commuter service)	Following station
Moskvorechye towards Moscow Kursky	Kurskoye line	Pokrovskoe towards Tula
Preceding station	Moscow Central Diameters	Following station
Moskvorechye towards Nakhabino	Line D2	Pokrovskoye towards Podolsk
Proposed
Moskvorechye towards Pushkino	Line D5	Kotlyakovo towards Domodedovo
Route map
Location

Tsaritsyno is a railway station on Line D2 of the Moscow Central Diameters located in Moscow. It was opened in 1865. The current station building was constructed in 1908, designed by architect V.K. Fillipov.

In Leo Tolstoy's novel "Anna Karenina", the station is mentioned in the context of a celebration for volunteers departing to fight in the Russo-Turkish War.

== Train movement ==
Passenger service is provided by suburban DC electric trains. There is a direct non-stop connection to the Riga direction of the Moscow Railway (until November 21, 2019, also to the Smolensk direction Outputs:

- To the Tsaritsyno metro station,
- along the pedestrian overpass to the streets: Kaspiyskaya and Sevanskaya on one side, and Cool, Butovskaya on the other.,
- under railway overpasses: to Kaspiyskaya and Luganskaya streets on one side and to the Tsaritsyno Museum-Reserve on the other.

Two side platforms are used for passengers. Turnstiles are installed on both platforms for passengers to enter the platform only.

Two short technical platforms were used to hold long-distance trains. The passage to these platforms was closed for passengers. In 2018, the access road to this platform was dismantled, and in its place a new side passenger platform was built for future MCD-2 trains traveling to the region, towards Podolsk. Now, some trains are stowed on the sidings at the Moscow-Tovarnaya station.

== History ==
It was opened in 1865. Then 18 miles from Moscow. When clearing the site for the station and the embankment for the railway track, about 5 desyatinas of the century-old pine forest were cut down. The connecting branch to Biryulyovo was built later, in 1900, and served exclusively for passenger traffic, including suburban traffic, since freight traffic between Kursk and Paveletskaya roads did not yet exist at that time.

In addition to freight and passenger trains, military trains followed the Kursk railway if there were military conflicts near the southern borders of Russia. Leo Tolstoy in the novel "Anna Karenina" describes the celebration of volunteers going to the Turkish War at Tsaritsyno station:

At Tsaritsyn station, the train was greeted by a harmonious chorus of young people singing, "Hail." Again, the volunteers bowed and leaned out, but Sergei Ivanovich did not pay attention to them.

The current Tsaritsyn railway station was built in 1908 by architect V. K. Fillipov. instead of the old wooden one. Some sources The authorship is attributed to Lev Kekushev, a famous architect who worked in the Art Nouveau style, and dates back to 1901-1903.

The wooden station was located exactly opposite the modern station, between the water tower and the kerosene cellar.Since 1908, it functioned as railway workshops, and then was converted into housing. In 1967, it was dismantled and transported to the Tula region. Even further from the current station building, where the Tsaritsyn radio market is now, there was a high freight platform with a warehouse. Since 1875, when a merchant of the 1st guild, Spiridon Egorovich Logunov, built a brick factory south of the station., It was used for loading bricks into wagons. It operated for various cargo operations until the mid-1980s, when the warehouse burned down during a fire.

The area around the station has been full of dachas since the Kursk Railway was built. In the marina settlements, the total number of dachas reached 1,000, and the summer residents who lived in them in the summer reached 15,000 people. This situation affected the station's name, and on January 1, 1904, it was renamed Tsaritsyno-Dachnoye. With this name, the station existed until 1960, when its territory was located within Moscow with all the surrounding villages. Then the station returned to its original name of Tsaritsyno..

On May 22, 2000, the platform towards the region was equipped with turnstiles. The only exit turnstiles were installed on this platform, where you do not need to insert a ticket with a barcode or attach a transport card in order to enter the city — free exit turnstiles. Since September 28, 2011, after the installation of new turnstiles, exit is carried out only by tickets.

In 2008, the pre-revolutionary water tower was demolished, renovated shortly before in 2002.

In 2016, the construction of new additional passenger platforms began. On September 10, 2018, the movement of Sputnik electric trains on the Tsaritsyno — Podolsk route began without stops. Complete restoration of the station, recognized as a monument of cultural heritage, It was held in 1998. In 2007, the following works were carried out:

- The facade of the station was painted in beige tones, and the old brickwork of the building was visually highlighted. Restorers assume that this is how the station looked more than a hundred years ago. A photograph taken around 1910 shows that the station is made of red brick with white architraves.;
- Major repairs of passenger platforms have been completed, asphalt has been replaced with paving slabs in two colors: gray and red in association with the colors of the Tsaritsyn ensemble.

In 2023, construction began on a new transport hub, which will include an underground, "warm" transfer to the metro station of the same name.. The work is scheduled to be completed in 2025.

== Ground public transport ==
At this station, you can transfer to the following urban passenger transport routes:

Buses: M82, M87, M88, M89, 814, C823, 844, C854, C869, 921, H13

Gallery

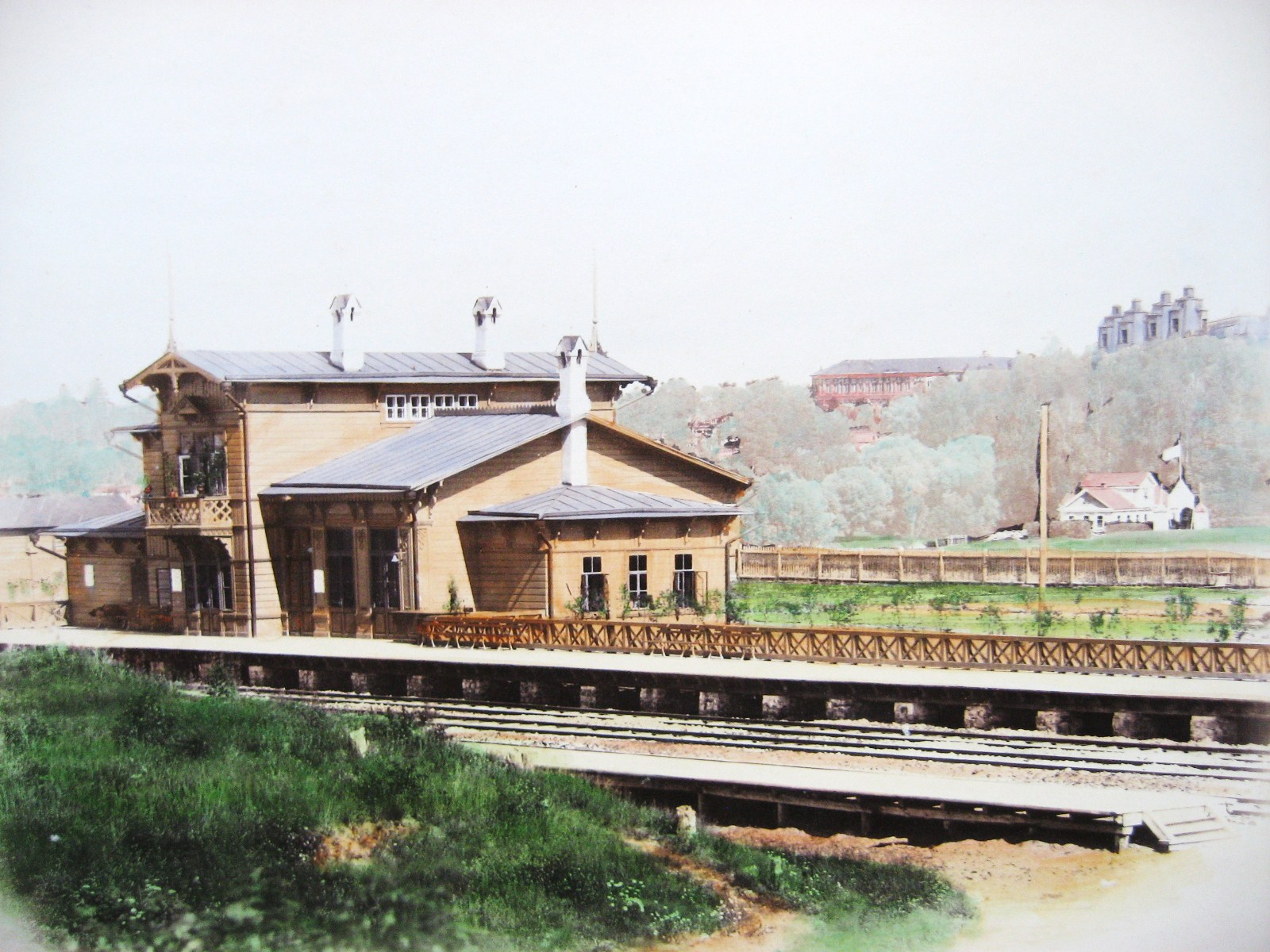
Tsaritsyno station. 1885

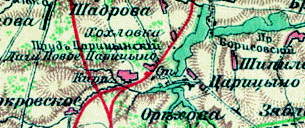
Tsaritsyno station on the map. The brick factories of S. E. Logunov are visible. Before 1904

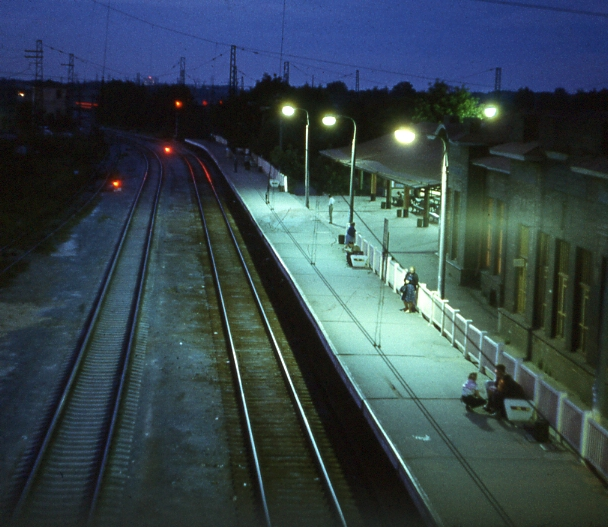
Tsaritsyno station in 1983

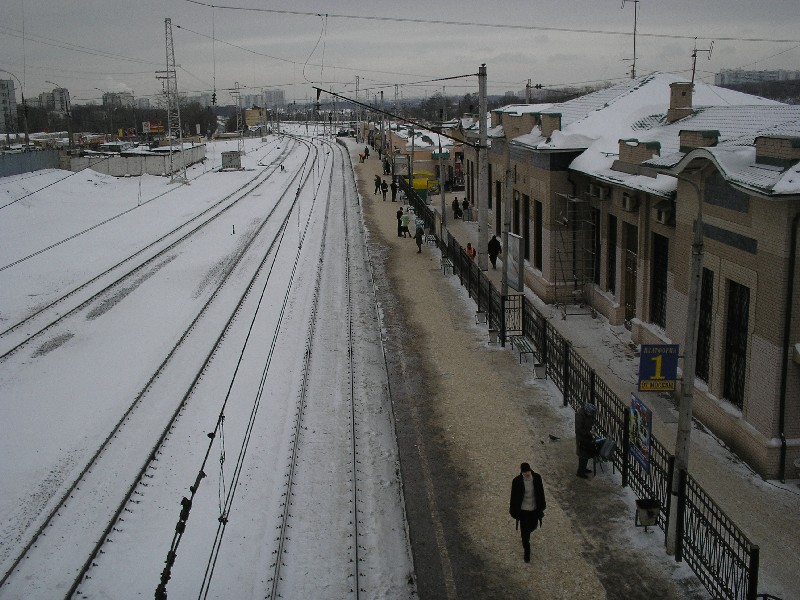
Tsaritsyno station in winter 2007

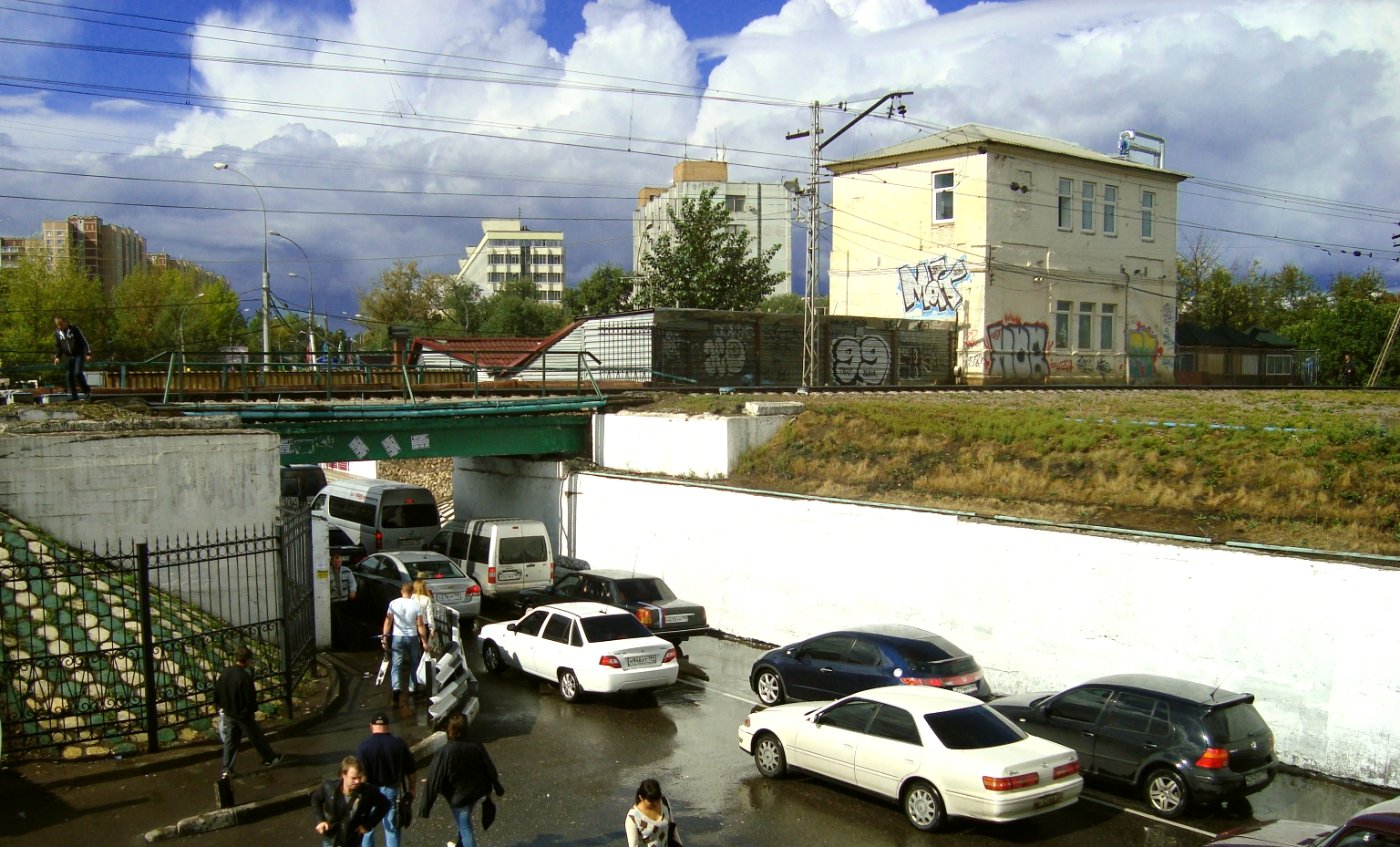
Old signal box and one of bridges on Tsaritsyno station. Russia.

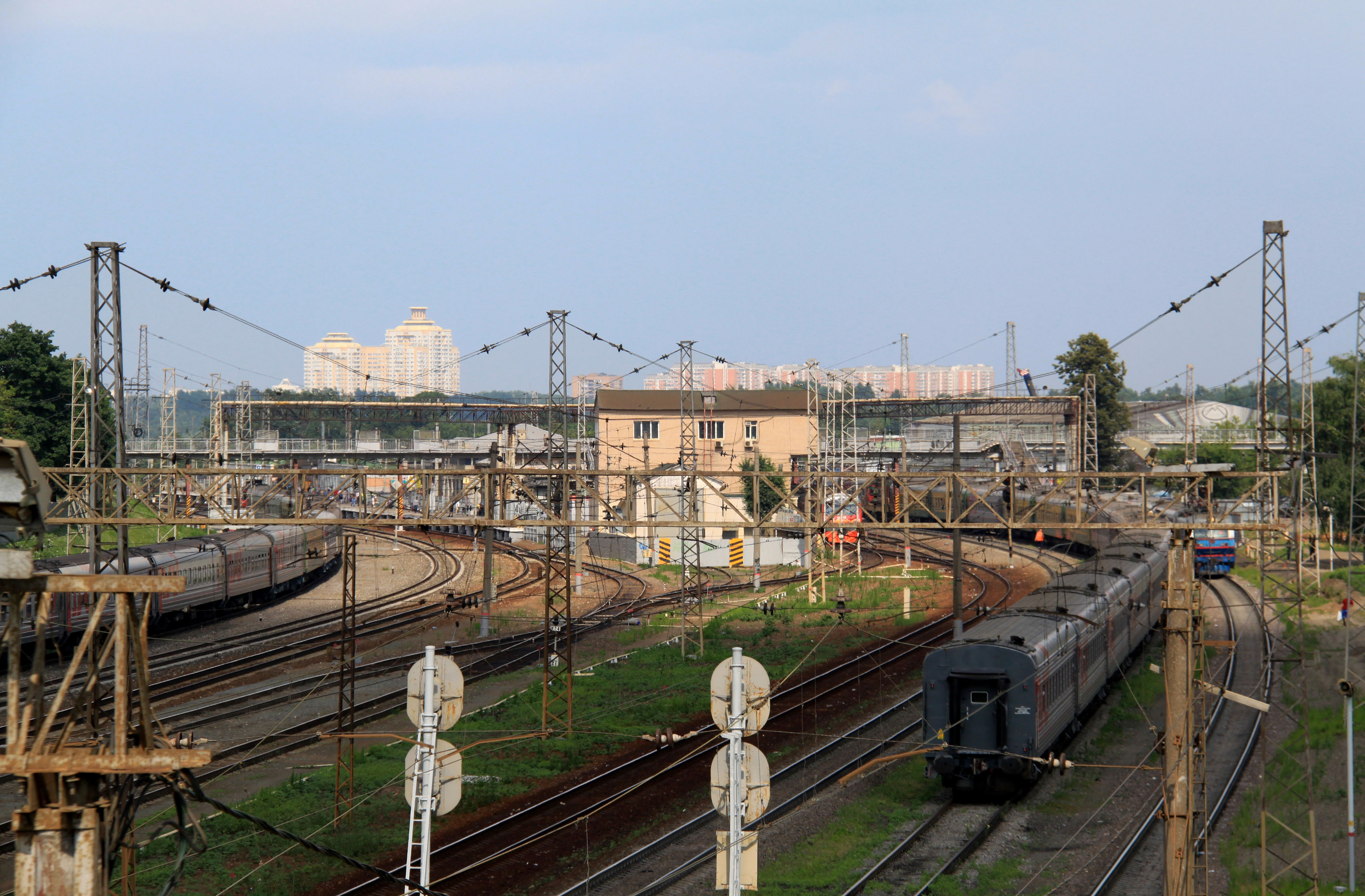
Access roads from the region, 2013

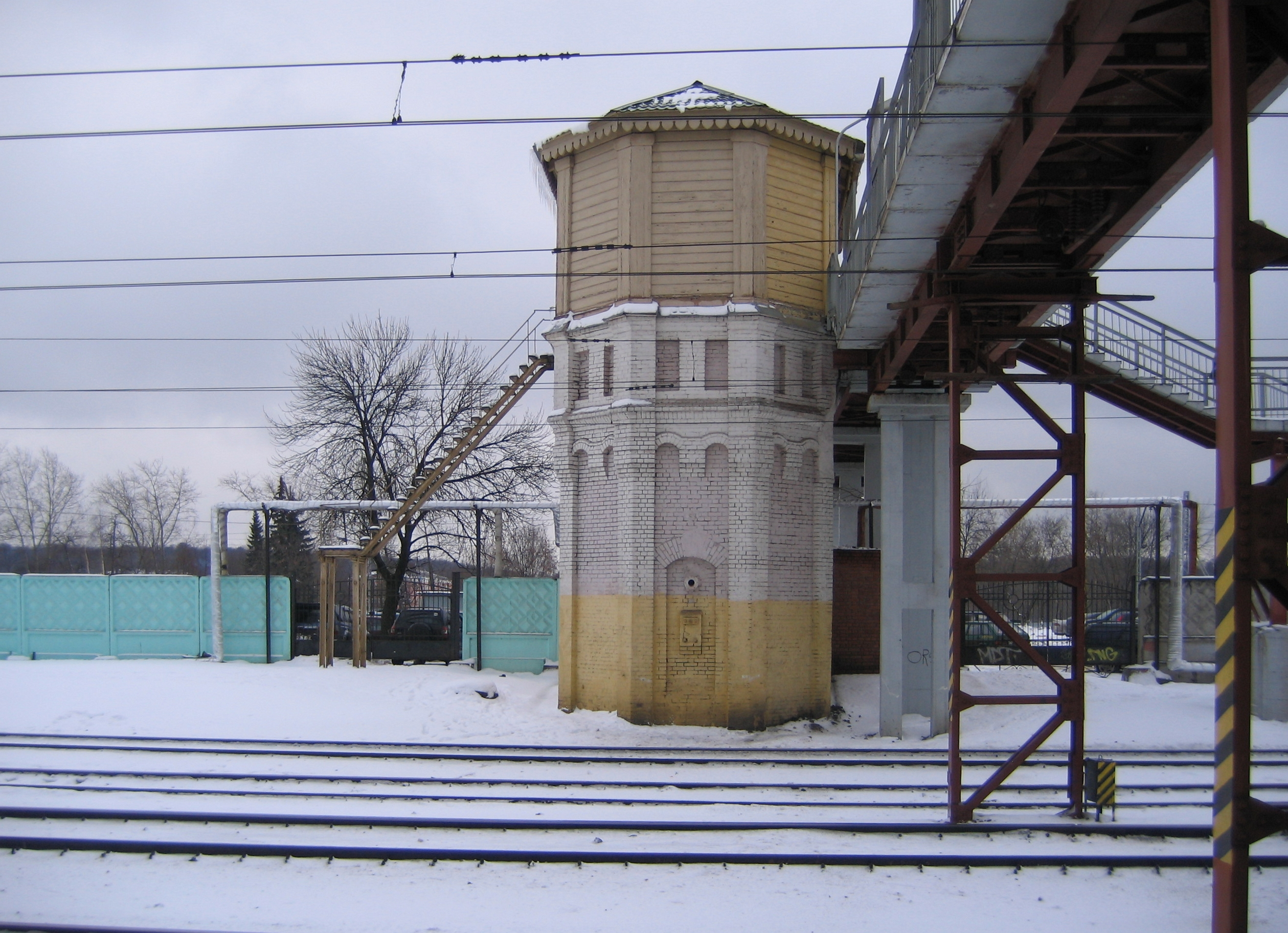
The water tower at Tsaritsyno station. Demolished in 2008

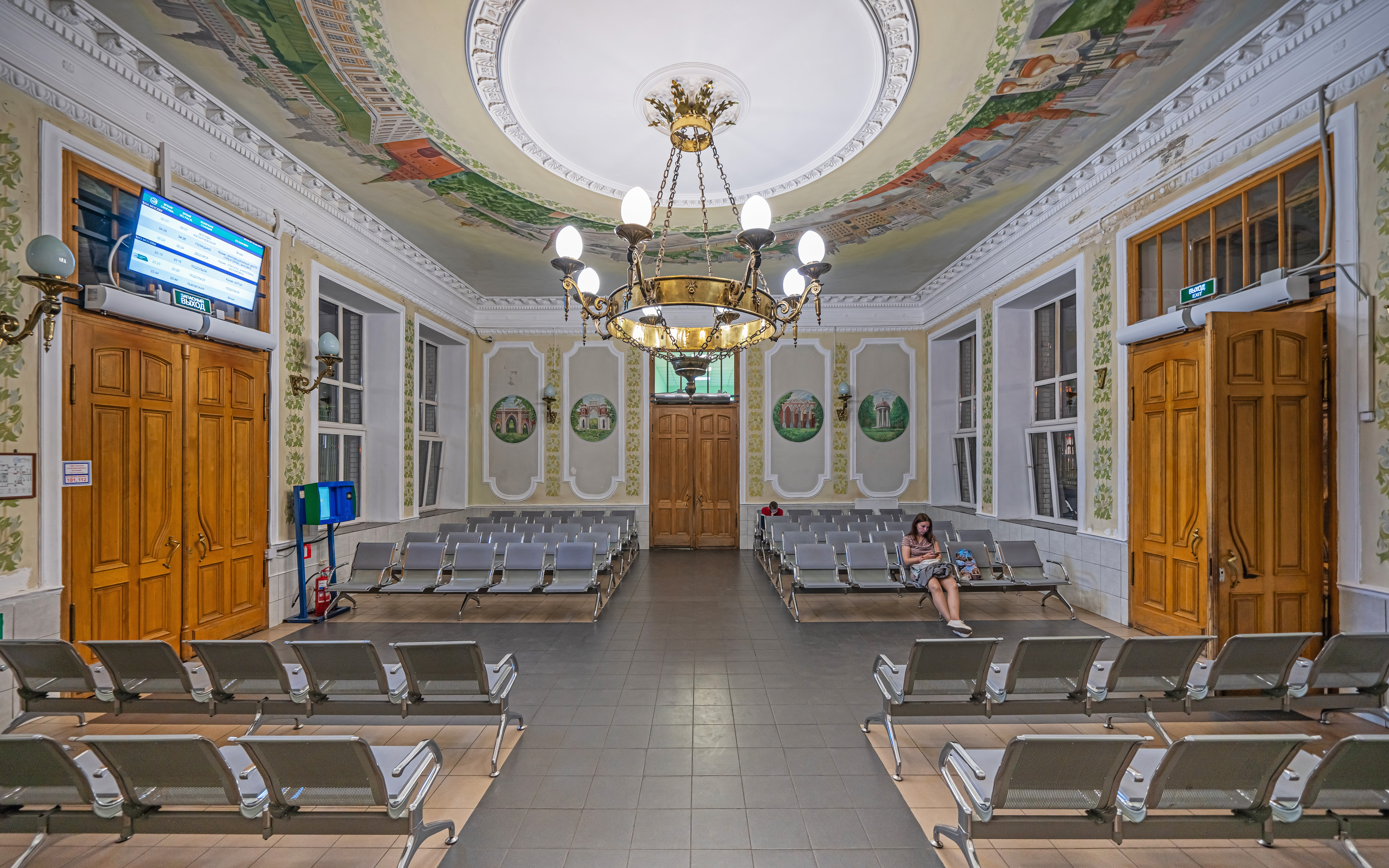
Waiting room of Tsaritsino railway station in Moscow, Russia
