= Ostafyevo railway station =

Railway station in Moscow, Russia

Ostafyevo Остафьево
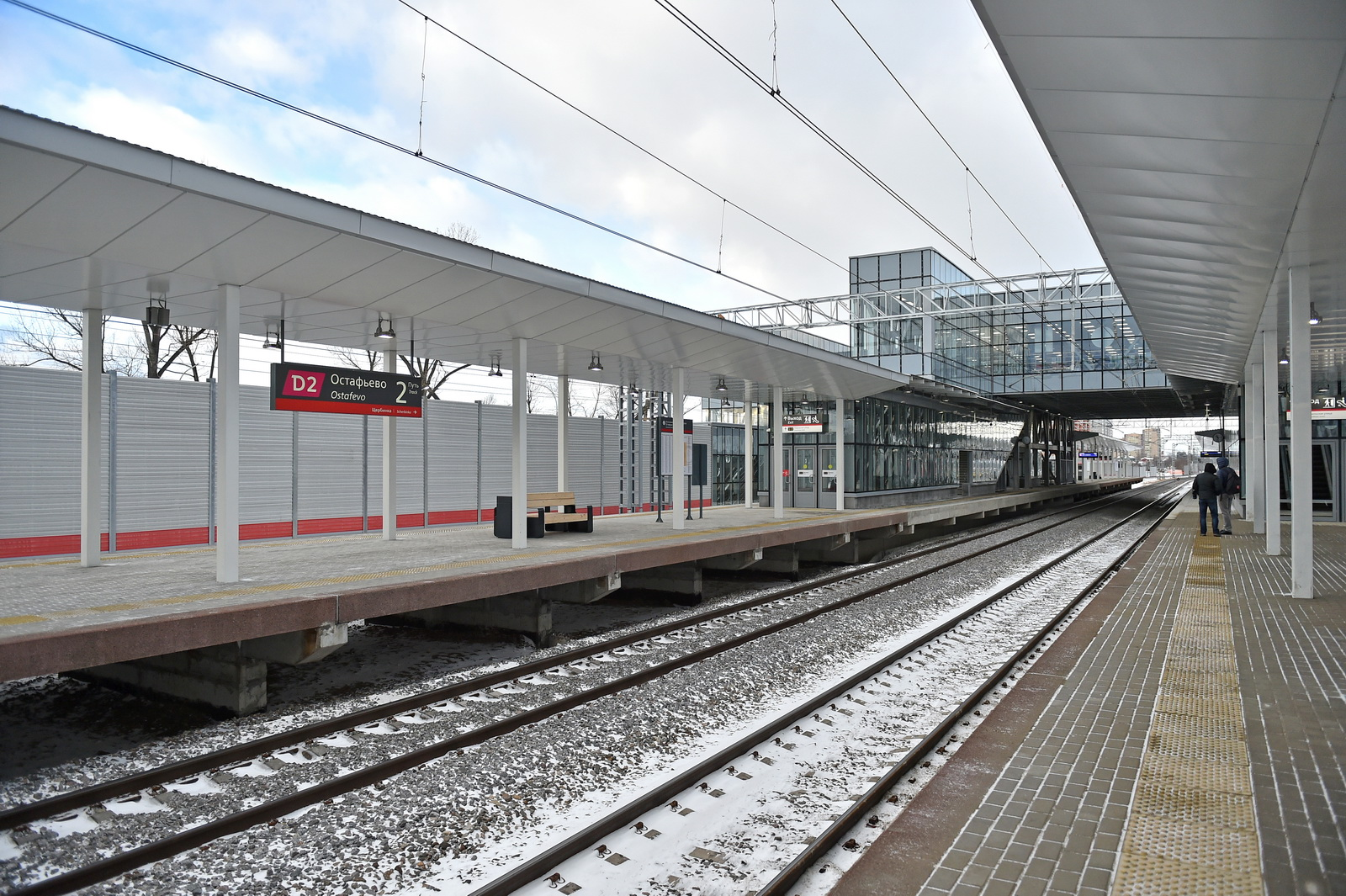

General information
- Location: Ostafyevo, Moscow; Russia
- Coordinates: 55.4858°N 37.5552°E
- System: Moscow Railway platform
- Owner: Russian Railways
- Operator: Moscow Railway
- Platforms: 2
- Tracks: 4

Construction
- Structure type: At-grade

History
- Opened: 2020

Services
Preceding station	Moscow Railway (commuter service)	Following station
Shcherbinka towards Moscow Kursky	Kurskoye line	Silikatnaya towards Tula
Preceding station	Moscow Central Diameters	Following station
Shcherbinka towards Nakhabino	Line D2	Silikatnaya via Fare zone boundary towards Podolsk
Route map
Location

Ostafyevo is a railway station of Line D2 of the Moscow Central Diameters in Moscow. It was opened in 2020.

== Gallery ==
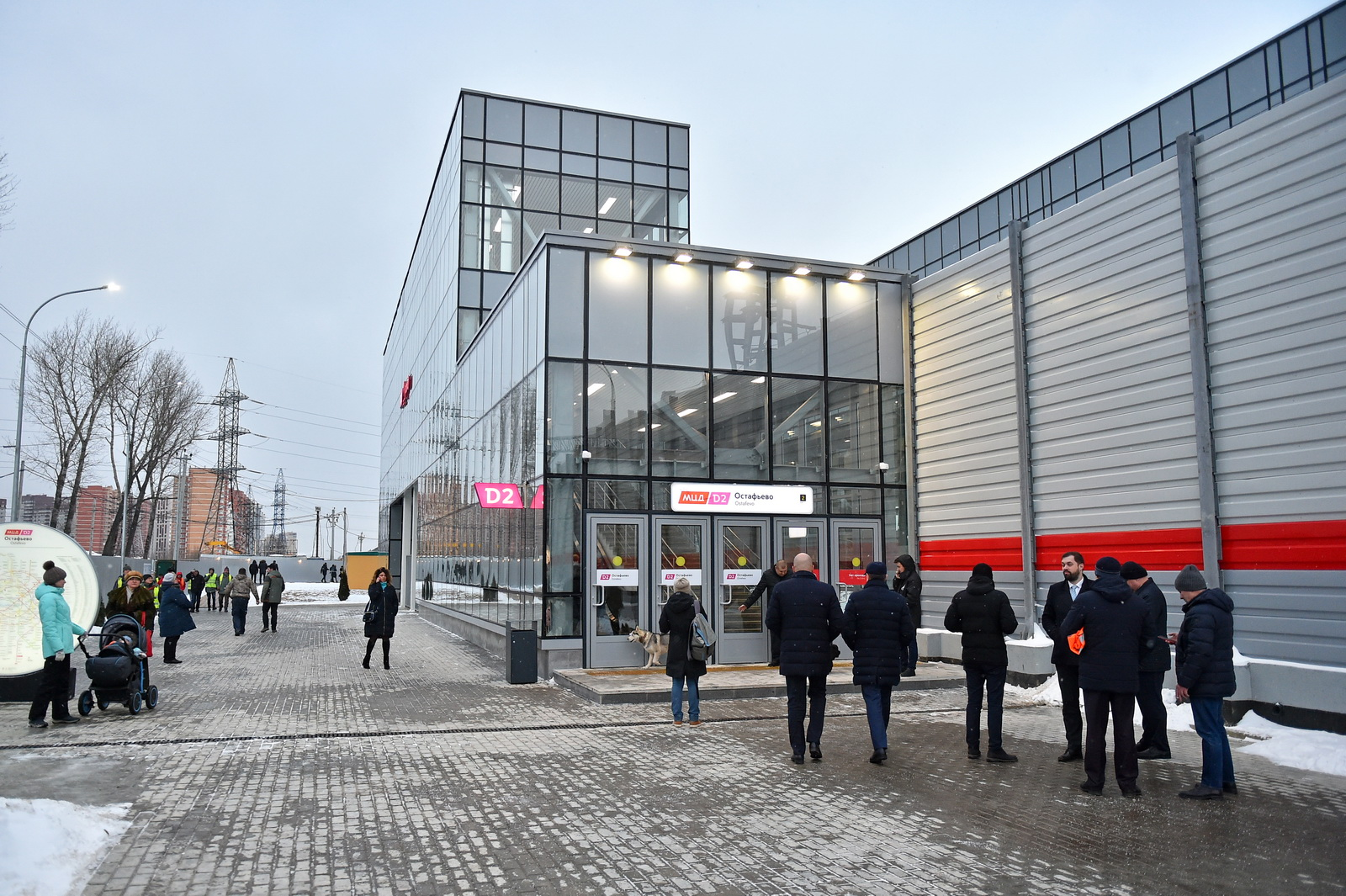

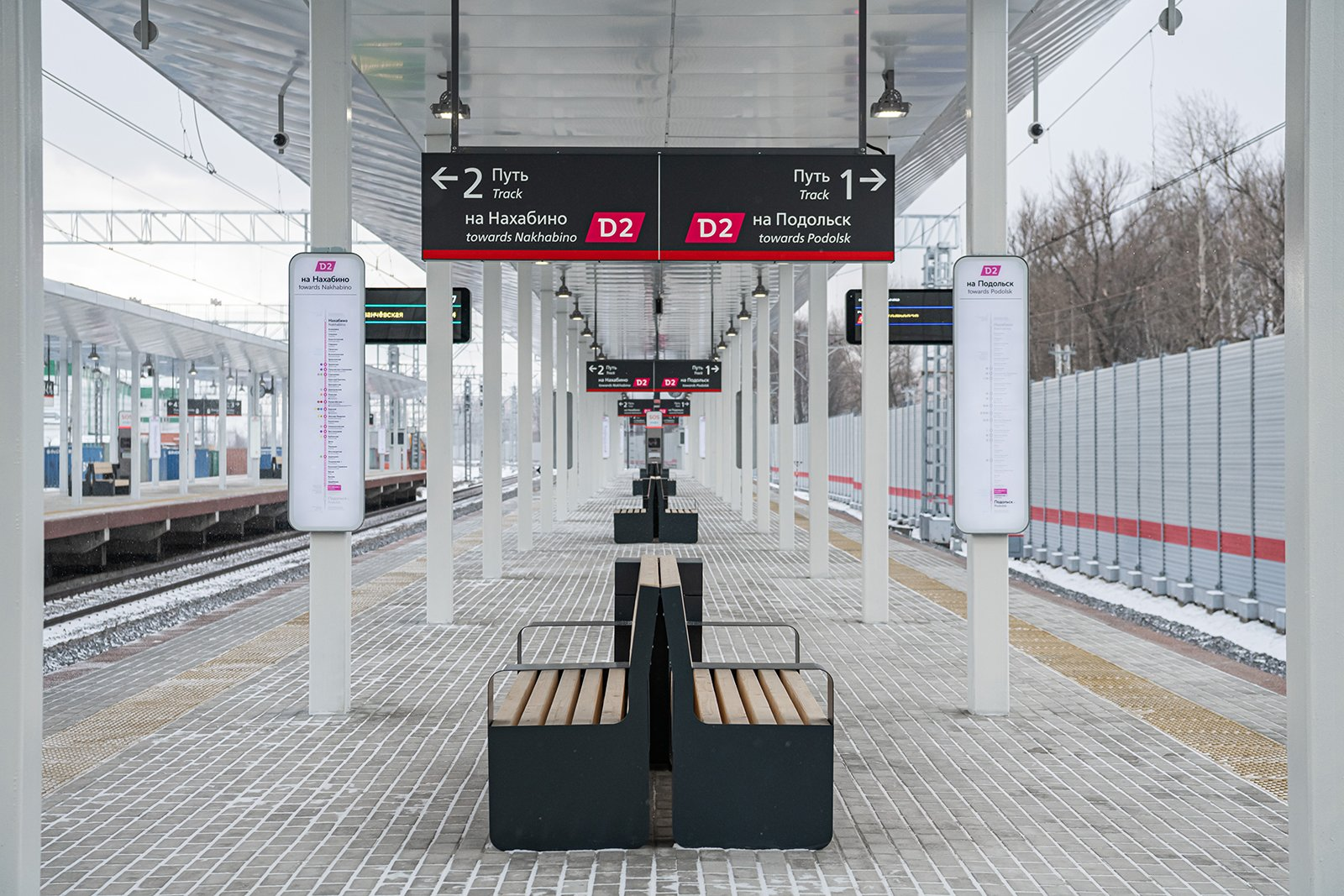

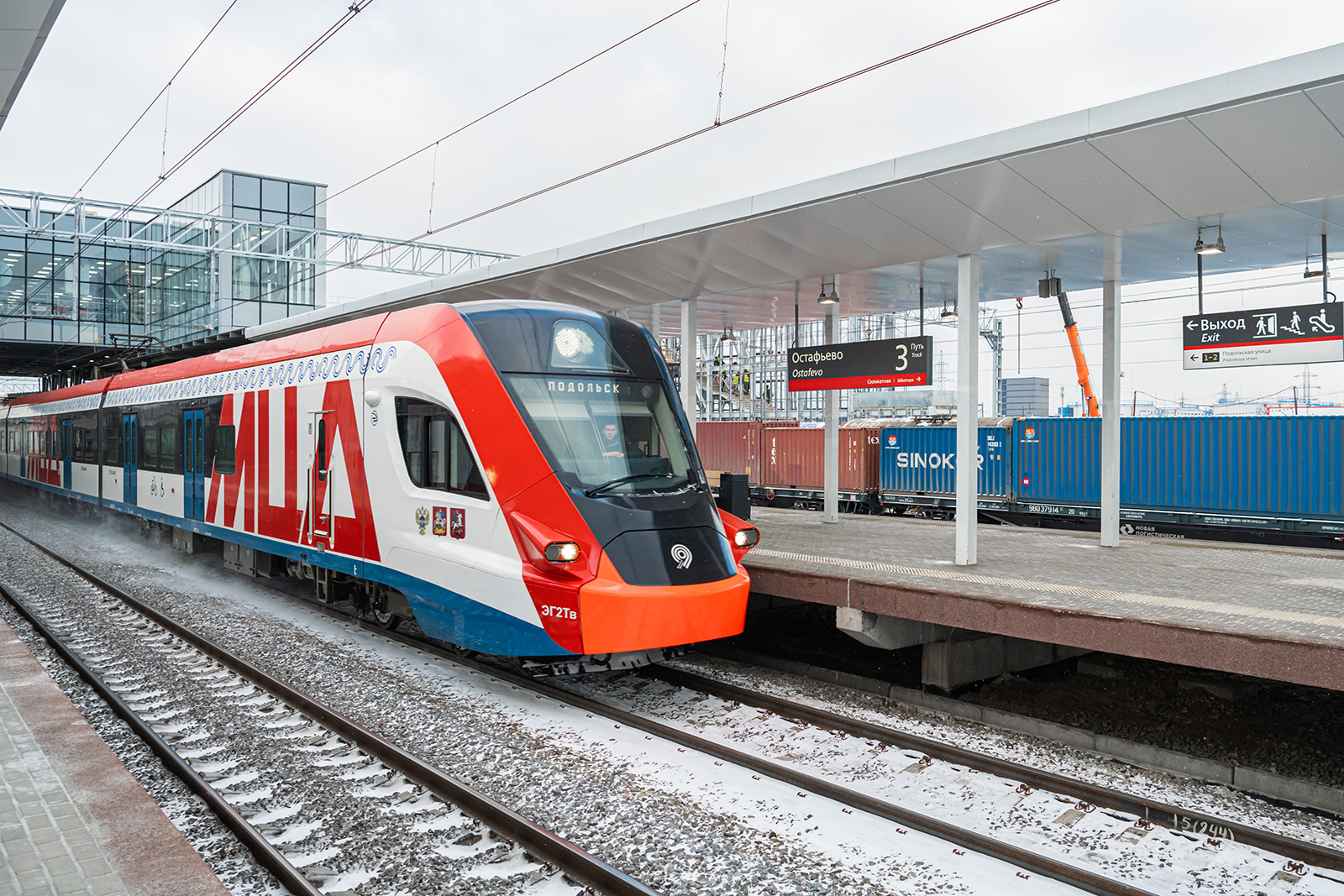
