= Shcherbinka railway station =

Railway station in Moscow, Russia

Shcherbinka Щербинка
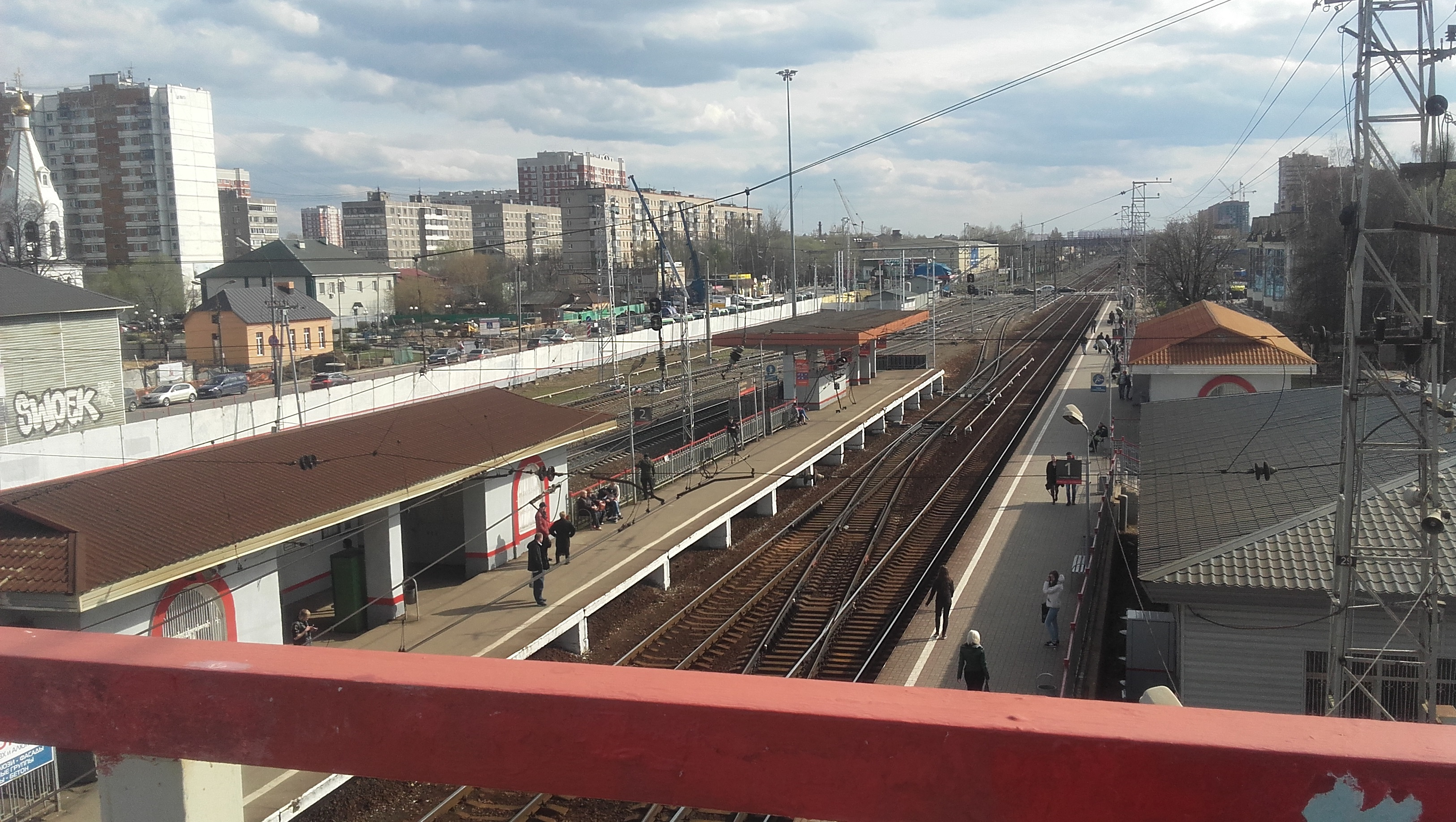
- Shcherbinka railway station in 2016

General information
- Location: Shcherbinka, Moscow; Russia
- Coordinates: 55.5101°N 37.5622°E
- System: Moscow Railway platform
- Owner: Russian Railways
- Operator: Moscow Railway

History
- Opened: 1895

Services
Preceding station	Moscow Railway (commuter service)	Following station
Butovo towards Moscow Kursky	Kurskoye line	Ostafyevo towards Tula
Preceding station	Moscow Central Diameters	Following station
Butovo towards Nakhabino	Line D2	Ostafyevo via Fare zone boundary towards Podolsk
Route map
Location

Shcherbinka is a railway station of Line D2 of the Moscow Central Diameters in Moscow. It was opened in 1895 and will be rebuilt soon.

== Description ==
The station has 4 main tracks and one receiving track for receiving trains with wagons to the station, brought from Podolsk station, as well as for the withdrawal of wagons from Podolsk station. The station has two high side boarding platforms on tracks designed for commuter and passenger electric trains. Freight trains run along the third and fourth tracks. The passenger platforms are positioned at an offset relative to each other. The platform on the second track (to Moscow) is shifted closer to Moscow, and the platform on the first track is shifted closer to the crossing. Pavilions with a ticket office are located on both platforms. Approximately in the middle of the platforms there is an above-ground pedestrian crosswalk with access to Zheleznodorozhnaya Street and Butovsky dead end. Another feature of the station is the location of the exit ramp between the main tracks and the passenger platforms.

There are many access roads adjacent to the station, including the Shcherbinsky test ring, where new railway and subway substations are being tested. Adjacent to the southern neck of the station is one of the tracks serviced by the Podolsk railway station. It is often necessary to put the wagons on the third track, which makes it inconvenient for odd freight trains to travel along this track on the move (they follow a deviation along the exits through the 4th track at a reduced speed). The station handles the turnover of suburban trains coming from Moscow. Most of these trains run during rush hour, with the exception of one daytime pair. A dead end zone is used for turnover, located behind the crossing between main tracks I and II.

The bus stop is a 46-minute drive from Kursky Railway Station, a 20-minute drive from Tsaritsyno station (the nearest station with access to the metro), an 8-minute drive from Podolsk station. It belongs to the central tariff zone.

On November 21, 2019, train traffic opened through Shcherbinka station on the MCD-2 line of the Moscow Central Diameters, after which there were almost no flights from/to Shcherbinka station.

In 2020, it was announced about the reconstruction of the station, which began in 2022.

On January 16, 2025, the reconstruction of the Moscow City railway station building was completed. The station is equipped with escalators, elevators, toilets and changing rooms.

== Gallery ==
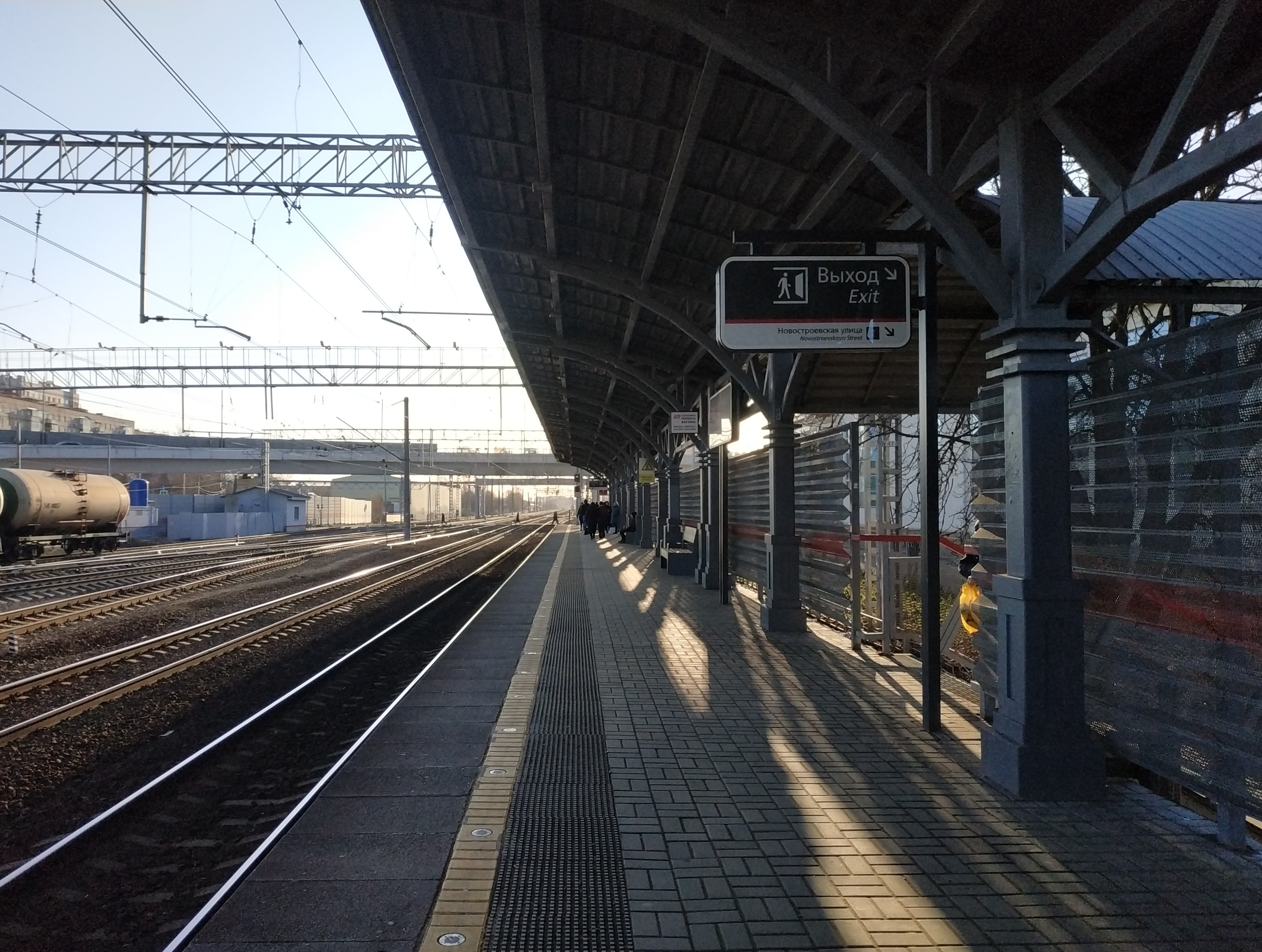
The station in 2019

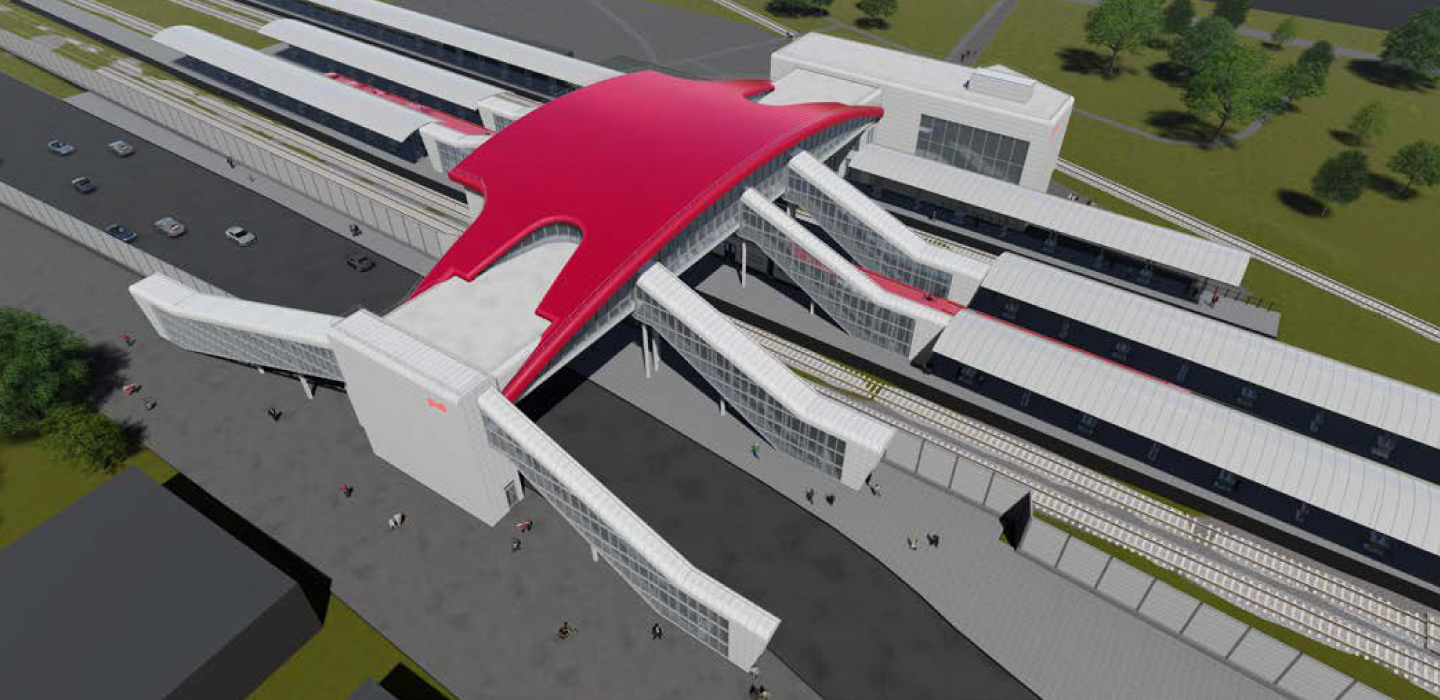
Rendering of the new station

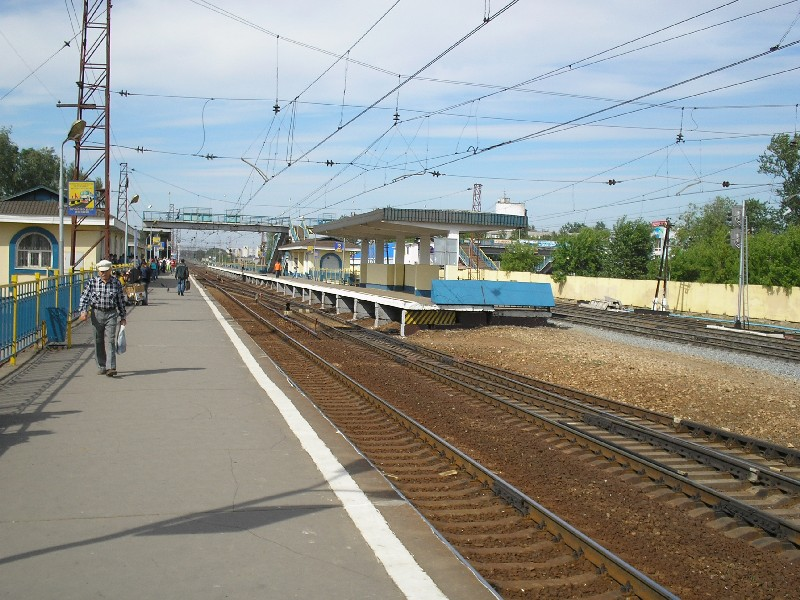
View of the platforms before reconstruction
