= Kuryanovo railway station =

Railway station in Moscow, Russia

Kuryanovo Курьяново
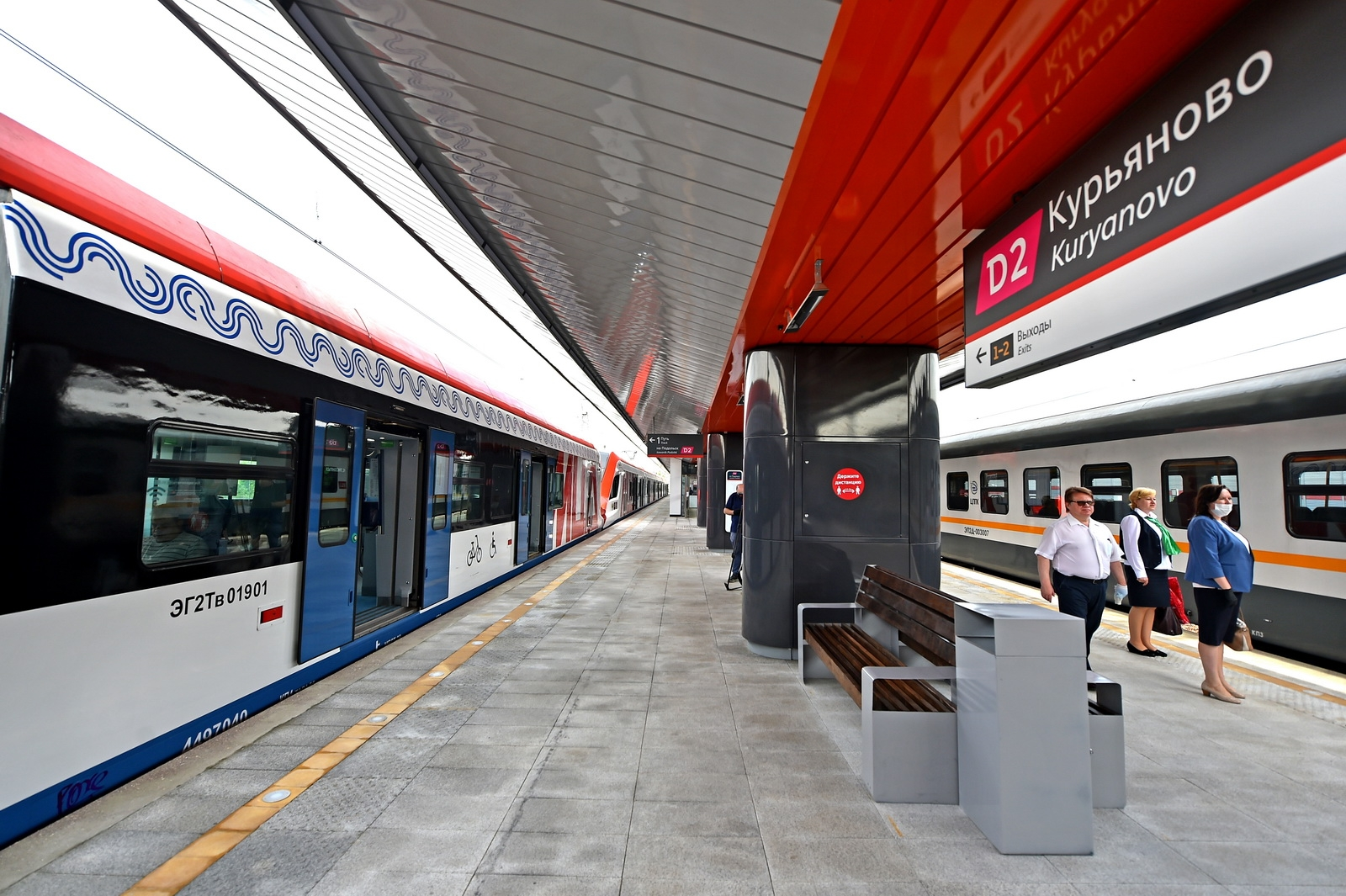

General information
- Location: Moscow; Russia
- Coordinates: 55.6498°N 37.7013°E
- System: Moscow Railway platform
- Owner: Russian Railways
- Operator: Moscow Railway
- Platforms: 1
- Tracks: 3

Construction
- Structure type: At-grade

History
- Opened: 2020

Services
Preceding station	Moscow Railway (commuter service)	Following station
Pererva towards Moscow Kursky	Kurskoye line	Moskvorechye towards Tula
Preceding station	Moscow Central Diameters	Following station
Pererva towards Nakhabino	Line D2	Moskvorechye towards Podolsk
Location

Kuryanovo is a railway station of Moscow Railway's Kurskaya line as well as Line D2 of the Moscow Central Diameters in Moscow. It was opened in 2020.

== Gallery ==
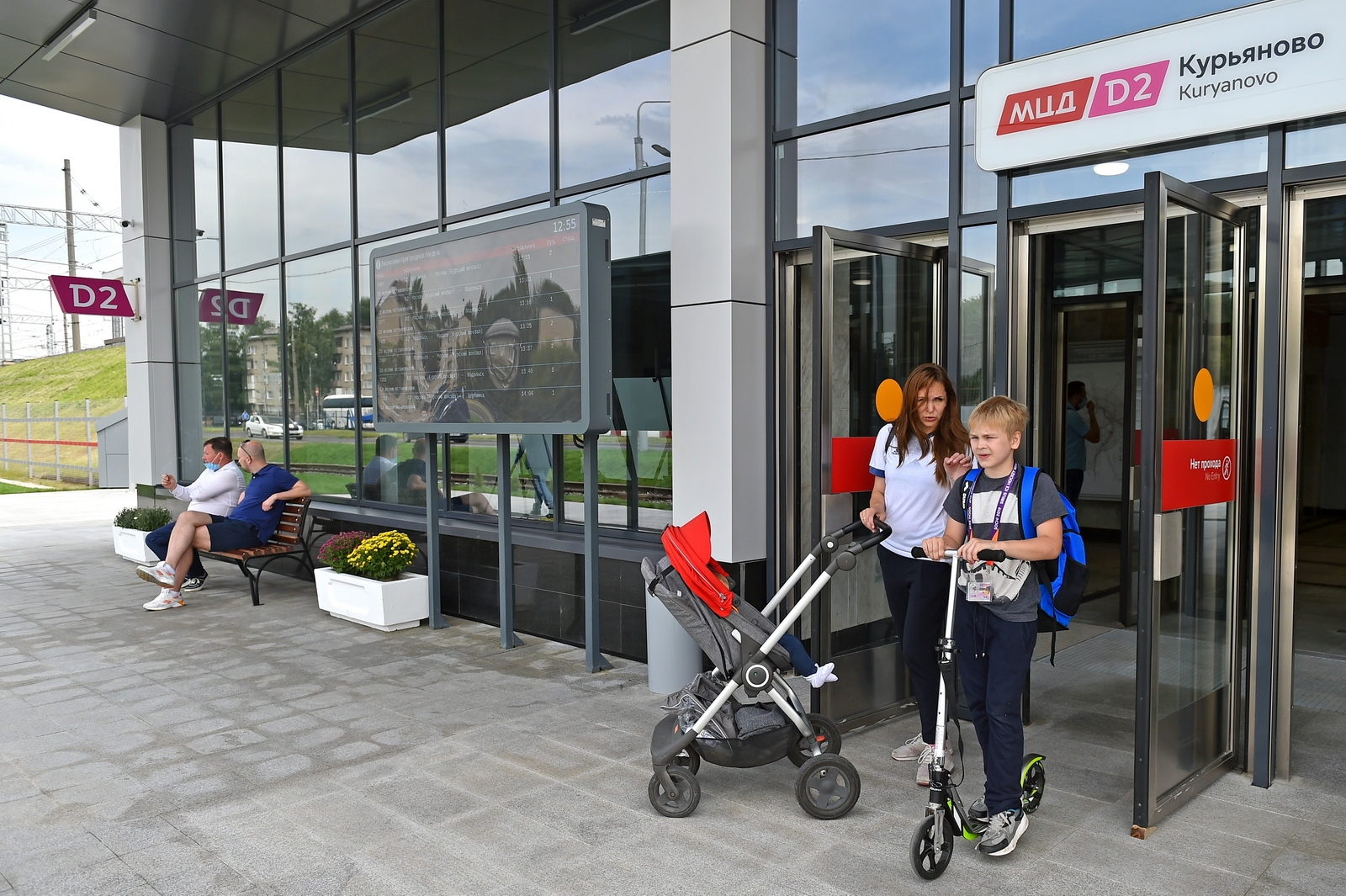

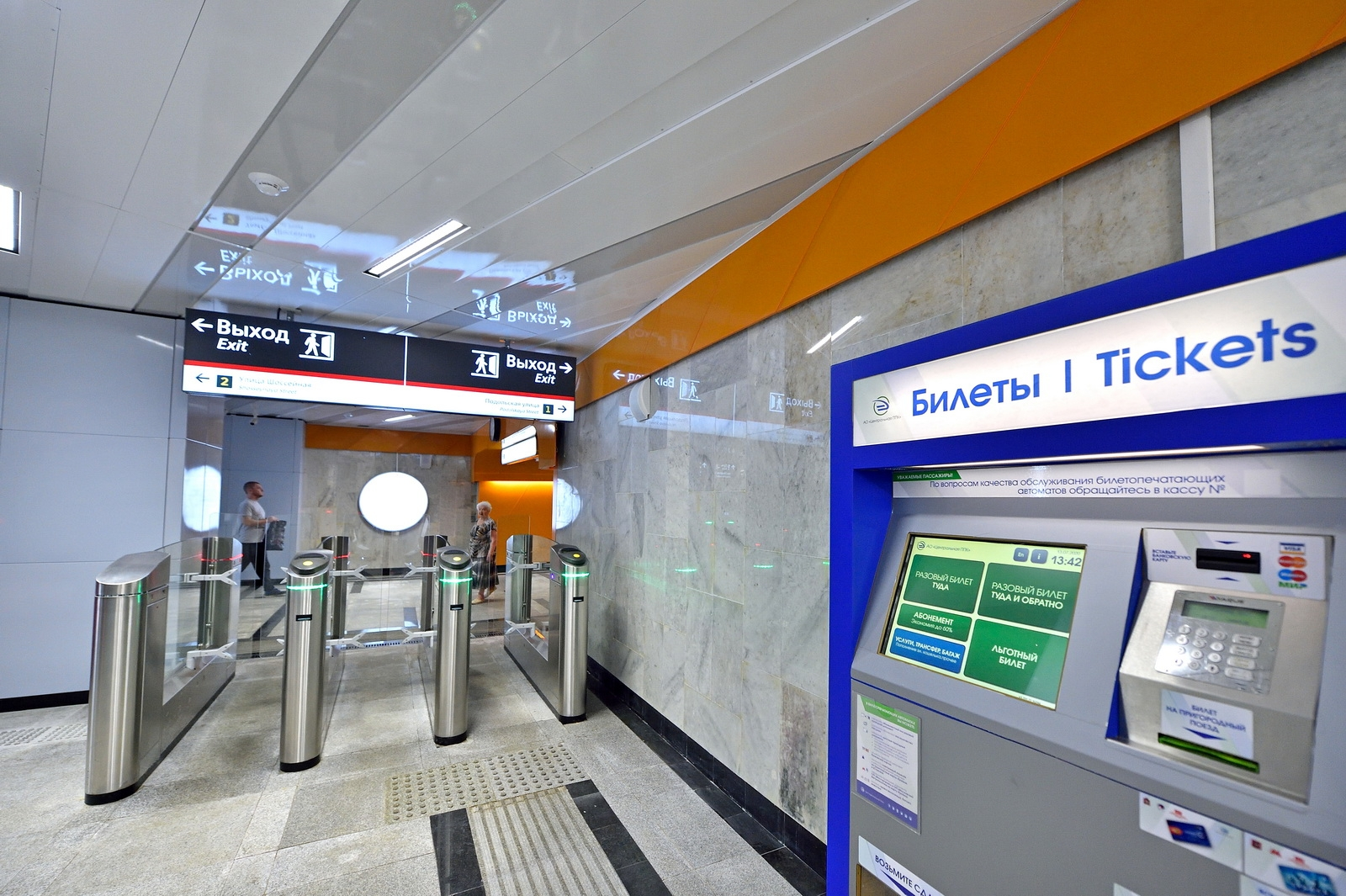

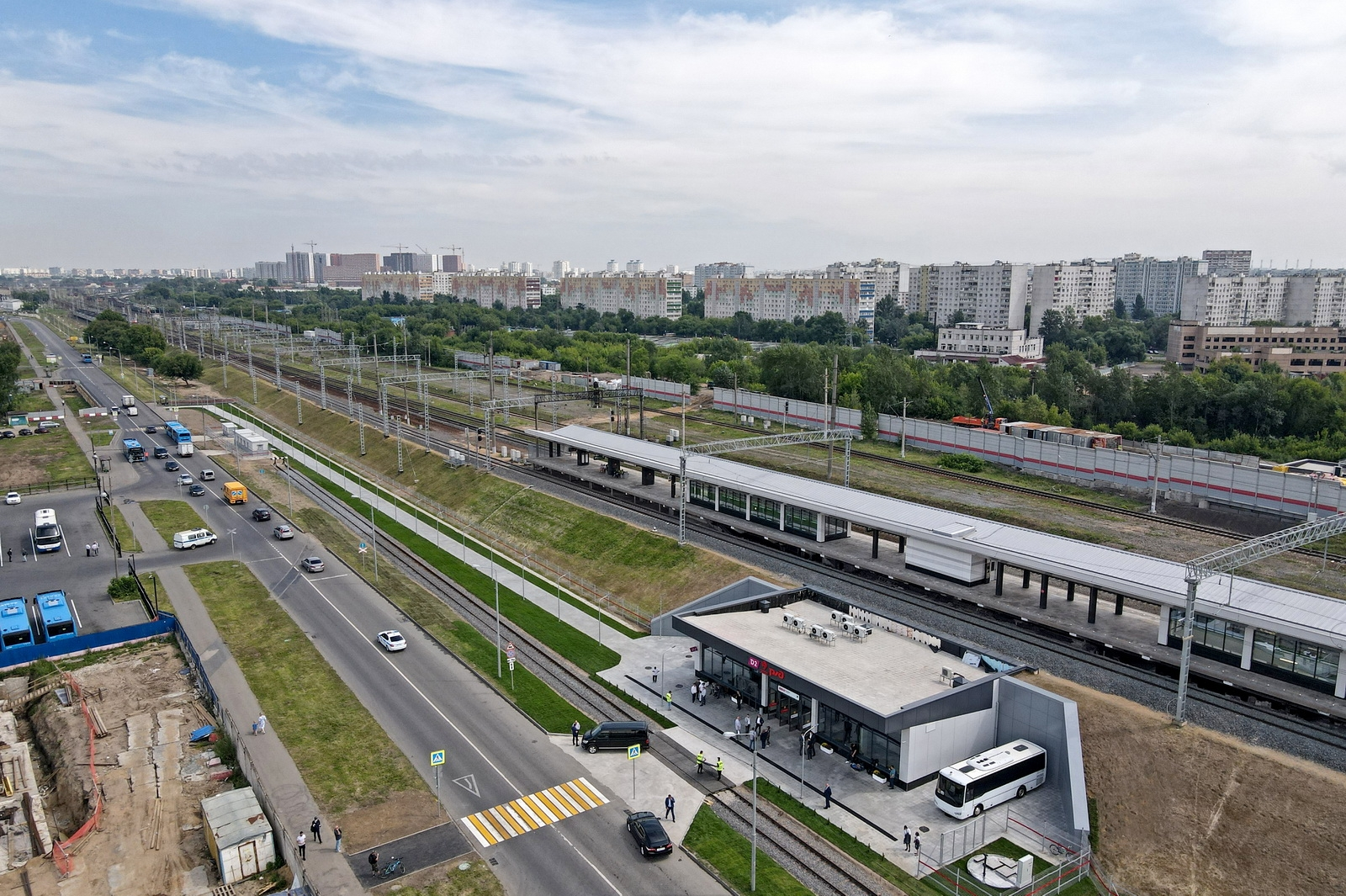
