= Novokhokhlovskaya railway station =

Railway station in Moscow

Novokhokhlovskaya Новохохловская
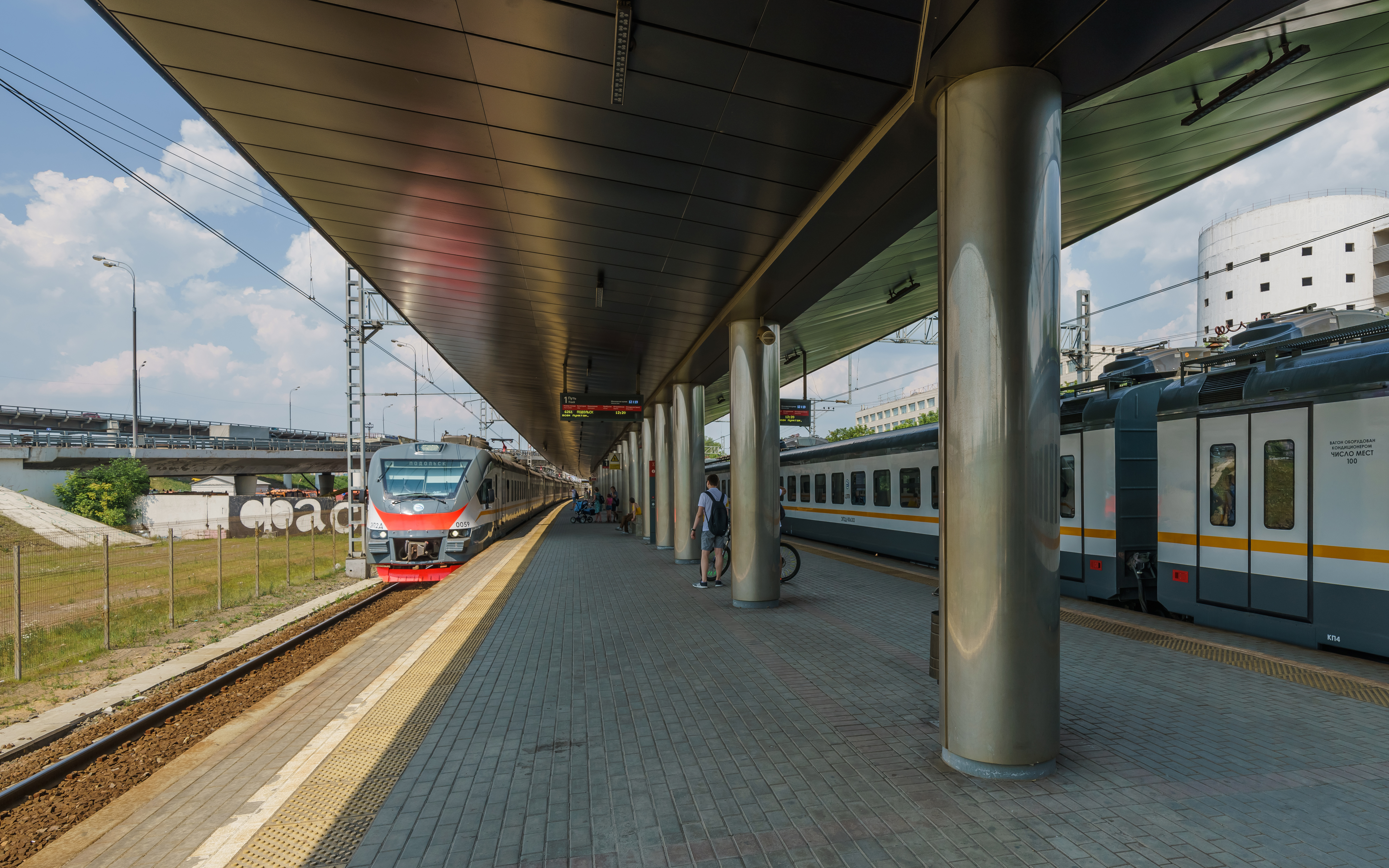
- Novokhokhlovskaya railway station in 2019

General information
- Location: Moscow; Russia
- Coordinates: 55.7249°N 37.7130°E
- System: Moscow Railway station
- Owner: Russian Railways
- Operator: Moscow Railway
- Connections: Novokhokhlovskaya

History
- Opened: 2018

Services
Preceding station	Moscow Railway (commuter service)	Following station
Kalitniki towards Moscow Kursky	Kurskoye line	Tekstilshchiki towards Tula
Preceding station	Moscow Central Diameters	Following station
Kalitniki towards Nakhabino	Line D2	Tekstilshchiki towards Podolsk
Proposed
Kalitniki towards Pushkino	Line D5	Tekstilshchiki towards Domodedovo
Location

Novokhokhlovskaya is a Moscow Railway station of the Kurskaya line as well as Line D2 and prospective Line D5 of the Moscow Central Diameters in Moscow, Russia. It was opened in 2018.

== Gallery ==
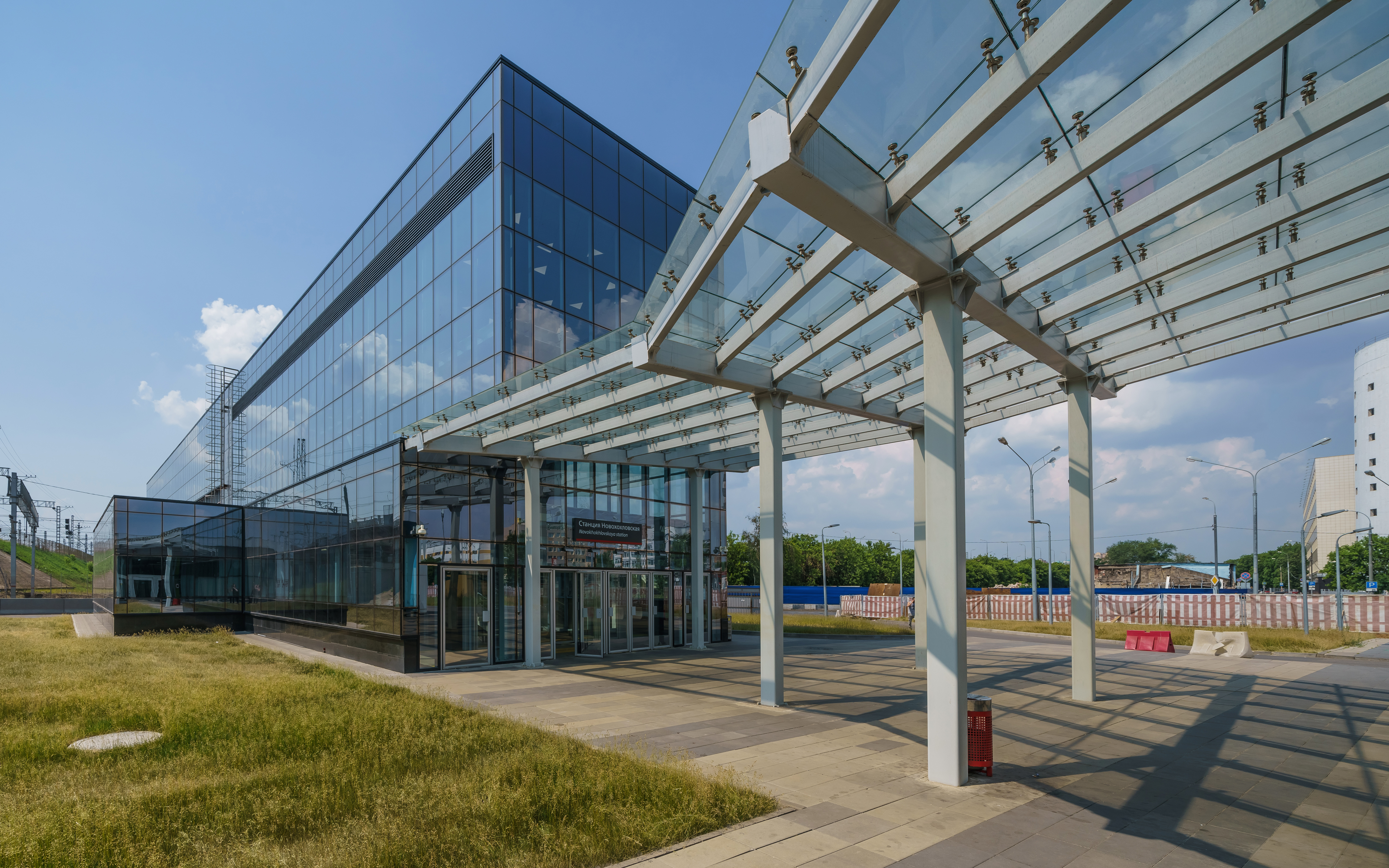

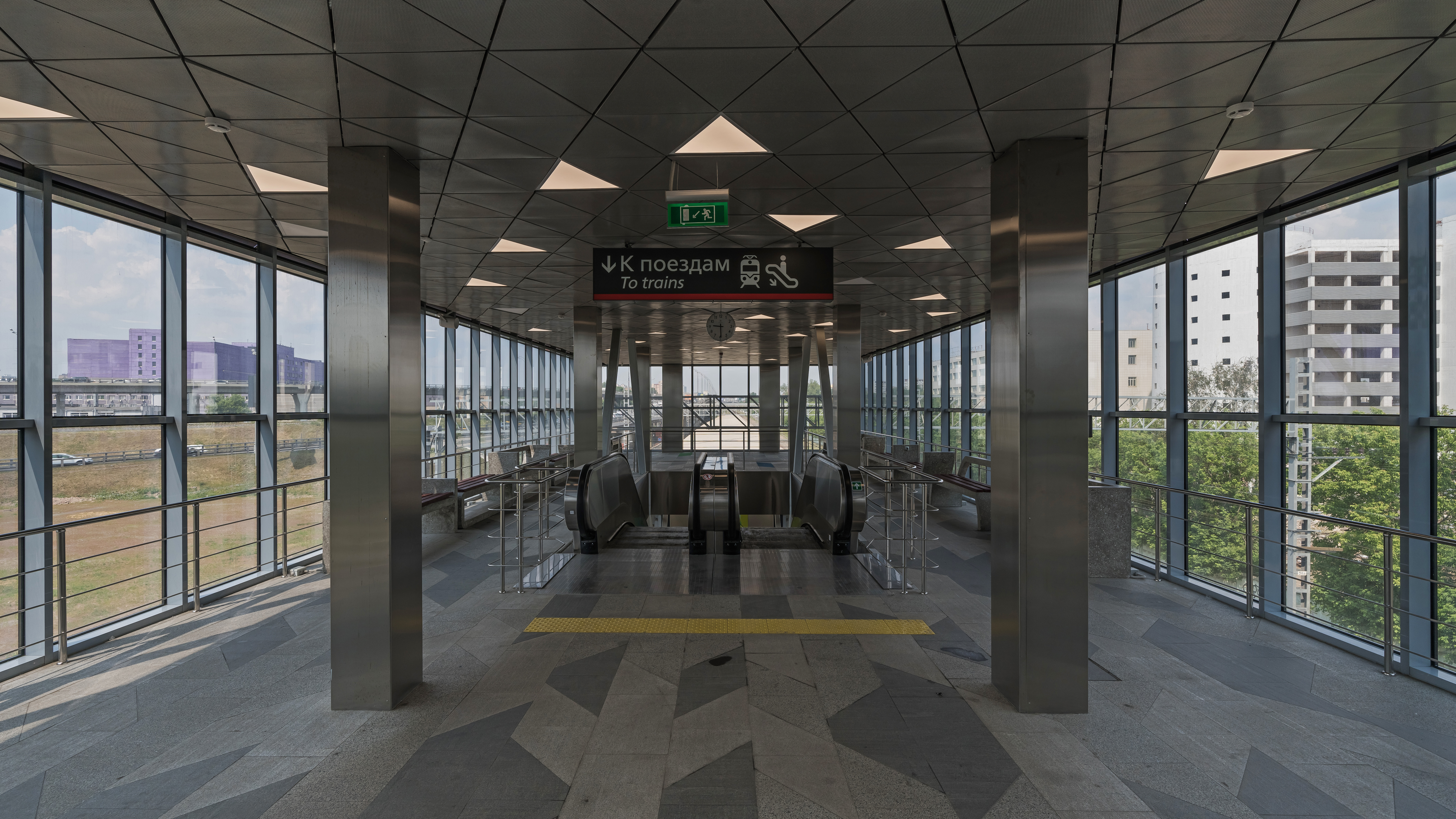
