= Yasnogorsk =

Yasnogorsk (Russian: Ясногорск) is the name of several urban localities in Russia:

- Yasnogorsk, Tula Oblast, a town in Yasnogorsky District of Tula Oblast; administratively incorporated as a town under district jurisdiction
- Yasnogorsk, Zabaykalsky Krai, an urban-type settlement in Olovyanninsky District of Zabaykalsky Krai
