= Novokhokhlovskaya (Moscow Central Circle) =

Station on the Moscow Central Circle

Novokhokhlovskaya Новохохловская
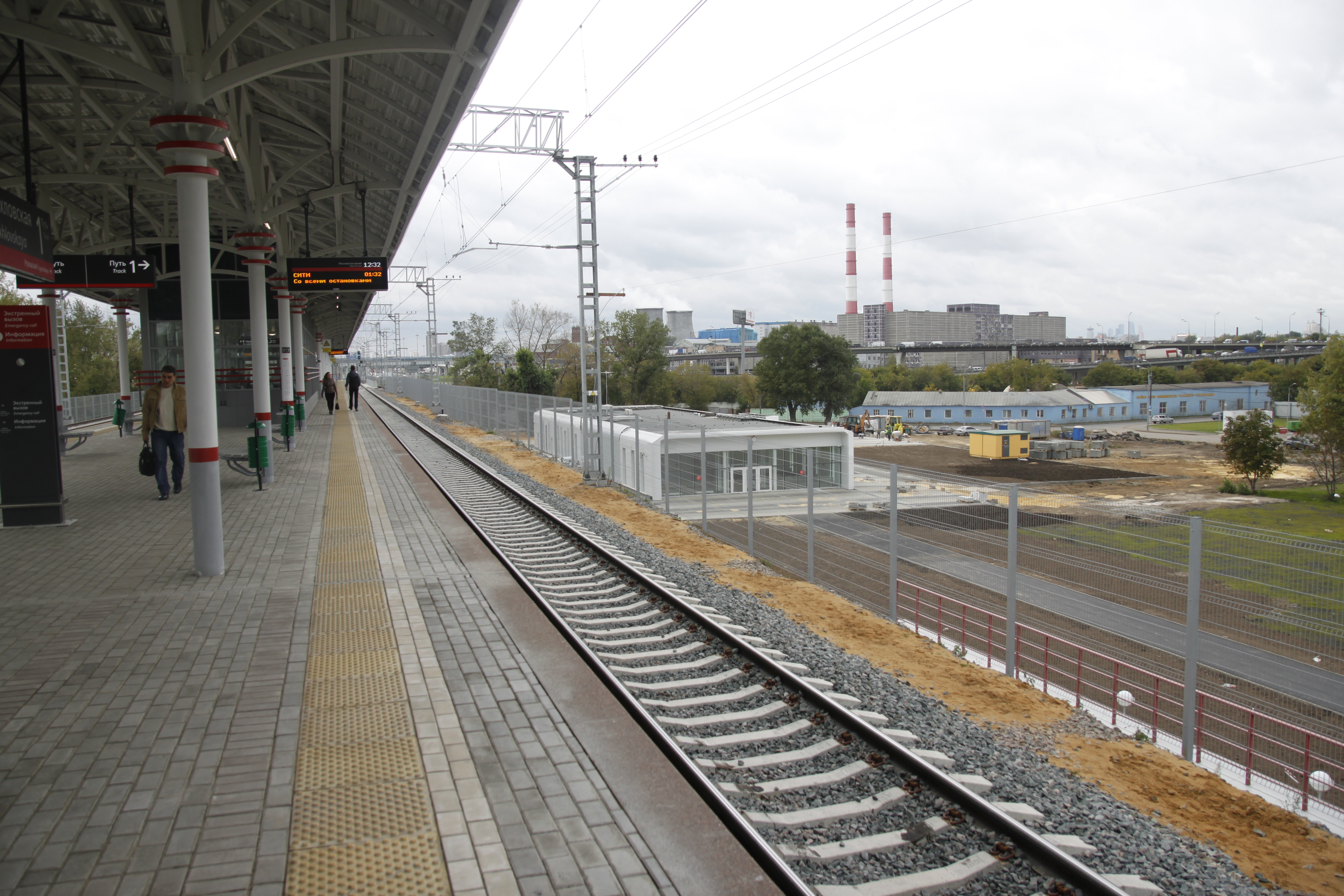

General information
- Coordinates: 55.7243°N 37.7173°E
- System: Moscow Metro
- Line: Moscow Central Circle
- Platforms: 2 side platforms
- Tracks: 2
- Connections: Novokhokhlovskaya

History
- Opened: 10 September 2016; 9 years ago

Services
| Preceding station | Moscow Metro | Following station |
|---|---|---|
| Nizhegorodskaya anticlockwise / outer | Moscow Central Circle | Ugreshskaya clockwise / inner |
Route map
Location
- Location within Moscow Metro

Novokhokhlovskaya (Russian: Новохохловская) is a station on the Moscow Central Circle.

== Gallery ==
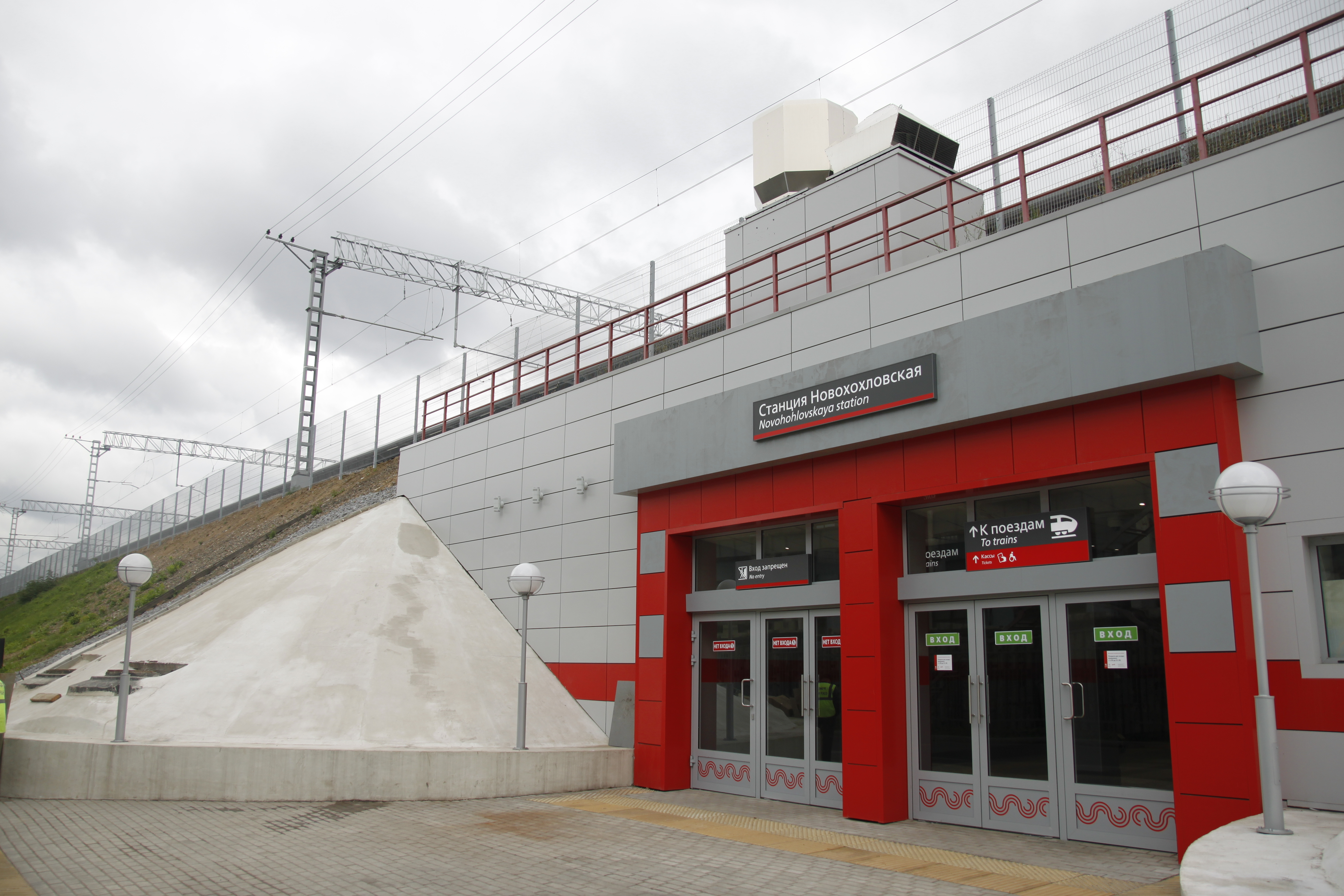

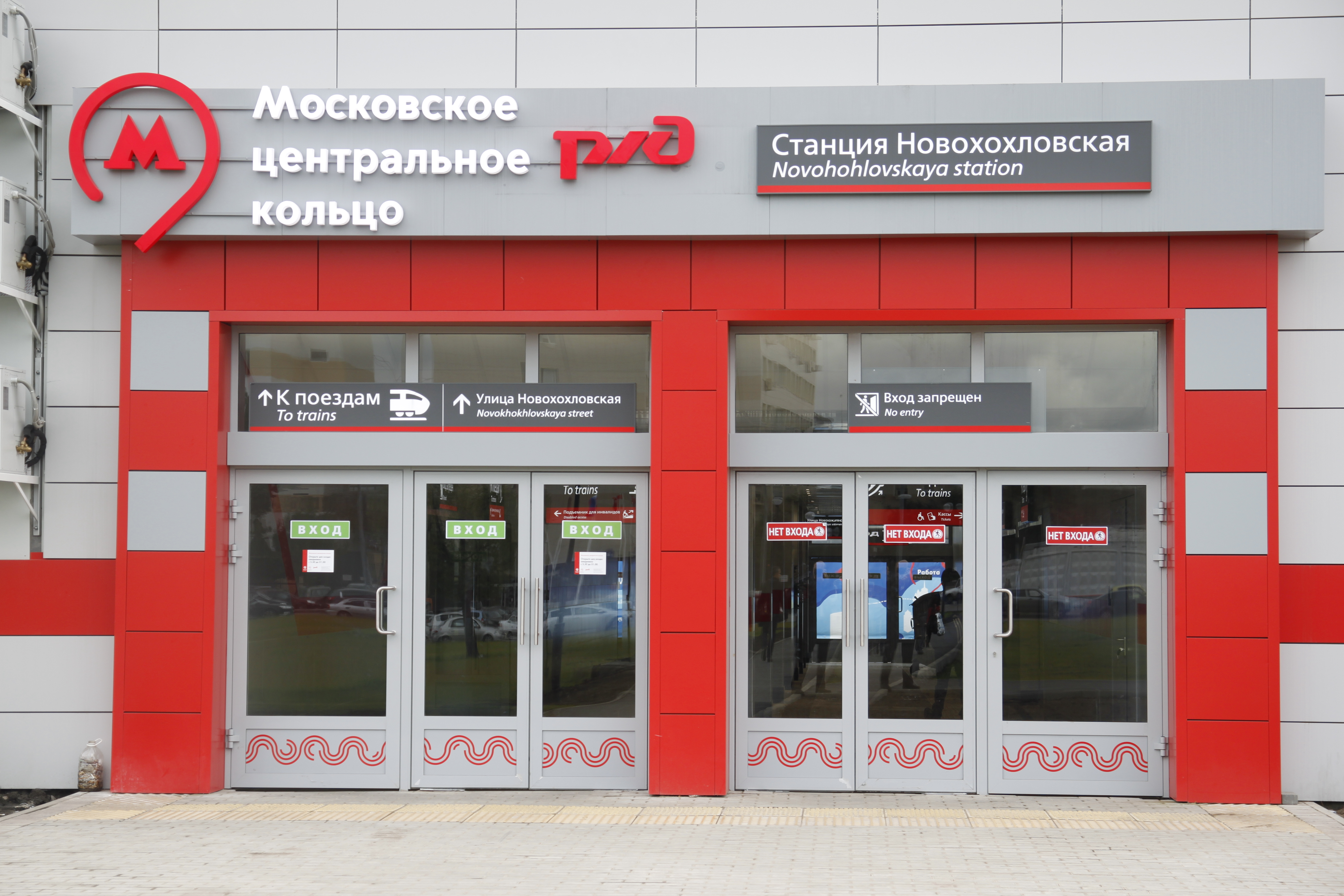

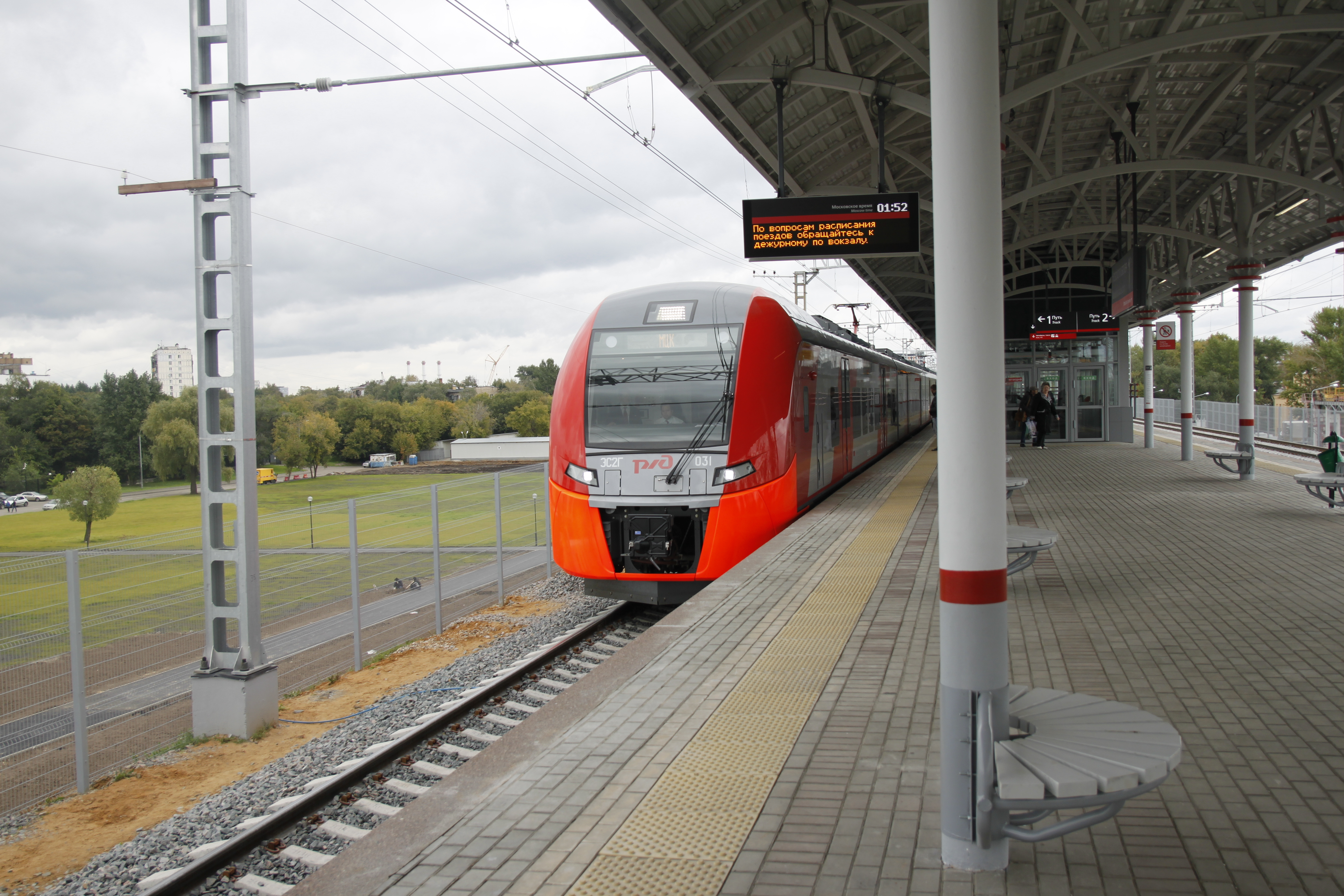
