= Tula railway station =

Railway station in Tula

Moskovsky Rail Terminal Московский вокзал
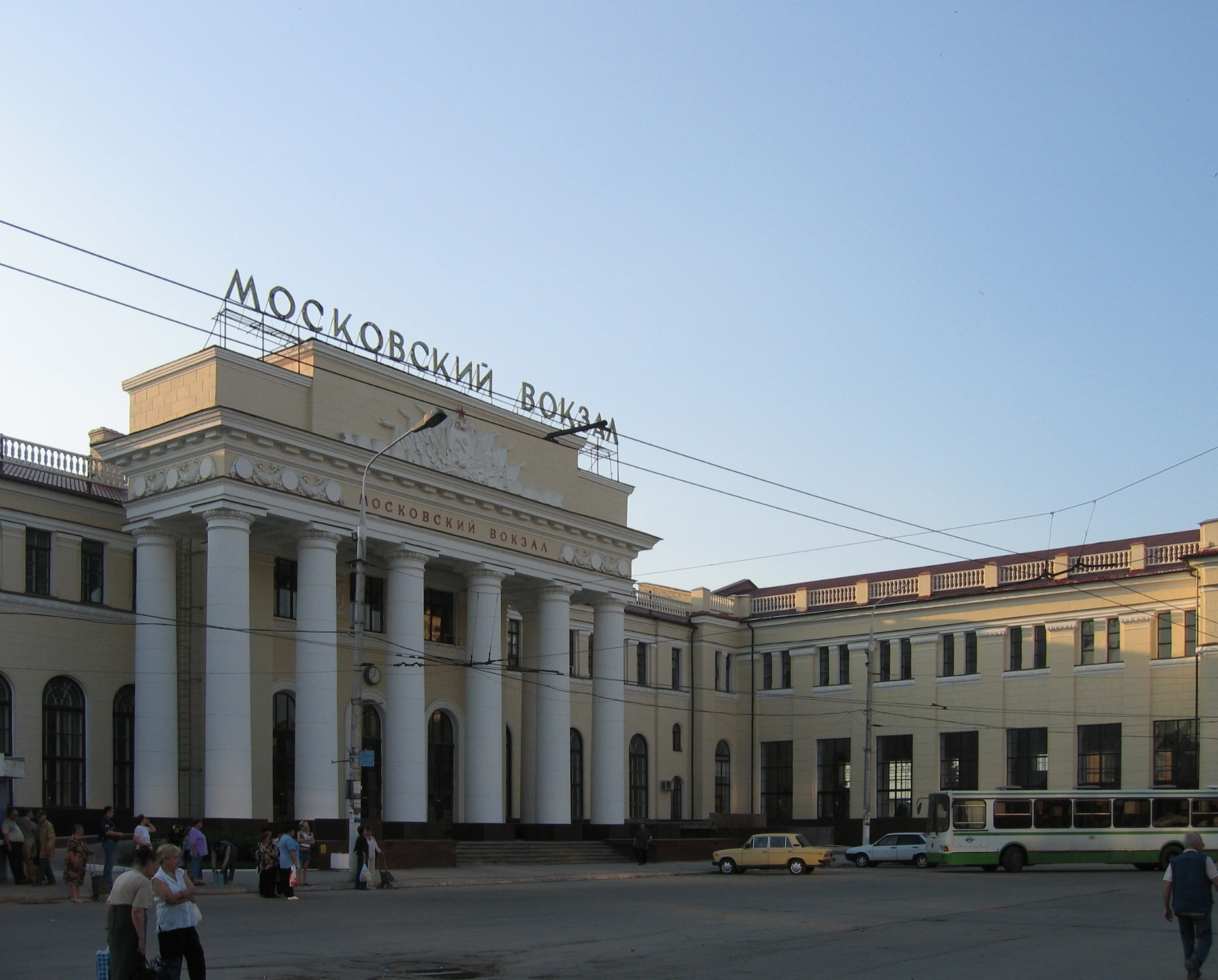

General information
- Location: Russia
- Coordinates: 54.1991°N 37.5776°E
- Owner: Russian Railways
- Operator: Moscow Railways

History
- Opened: 1867
- Former names: Kursky Rail Terminal

Services
Preceding station	Moscow Railway (commuter service)	Following station
191 km towards Moscow Kursky	Kurskoye line	Terminus
Terminus	Kurskoye line	Tula-2 towards Oryol
Location

Tula or Moskovsky Rail Terminal (Russian: Московский вокзал) is a railway station in Tula, Russia. It was opened in 1867.

== History ==
On November 11, 1867 railway service opened between Moscow and Tula. In 1864 the construction of the Moscow-Kursk railway began. On December 28, 1864 the government announced the continuation of the railway from Serpukhov through Tula to Orel and Kursk.

In 1867 a bridge was built across the Oka (engineer – Amand Struve). By 1868 the construction of the railway bridge over the Upu was completed.

In the middle of the XIX century the station square was considered the outskirts of Tula.

On September 7, 1868 the Kursk Railway Station building was opened. At the beginning of the XX century the Kursk railway station received a stone building.

In 1914-1916 a military hospital for soldiers wounded on the fronts of the First World War worked at the Kursk railway station in Tula.

In 1954 Soviet architects developed a project for the reconstruction of the station. A restaurant and a police station appeared there. In the XXI century another reconstruction took place.

== Gallery ==
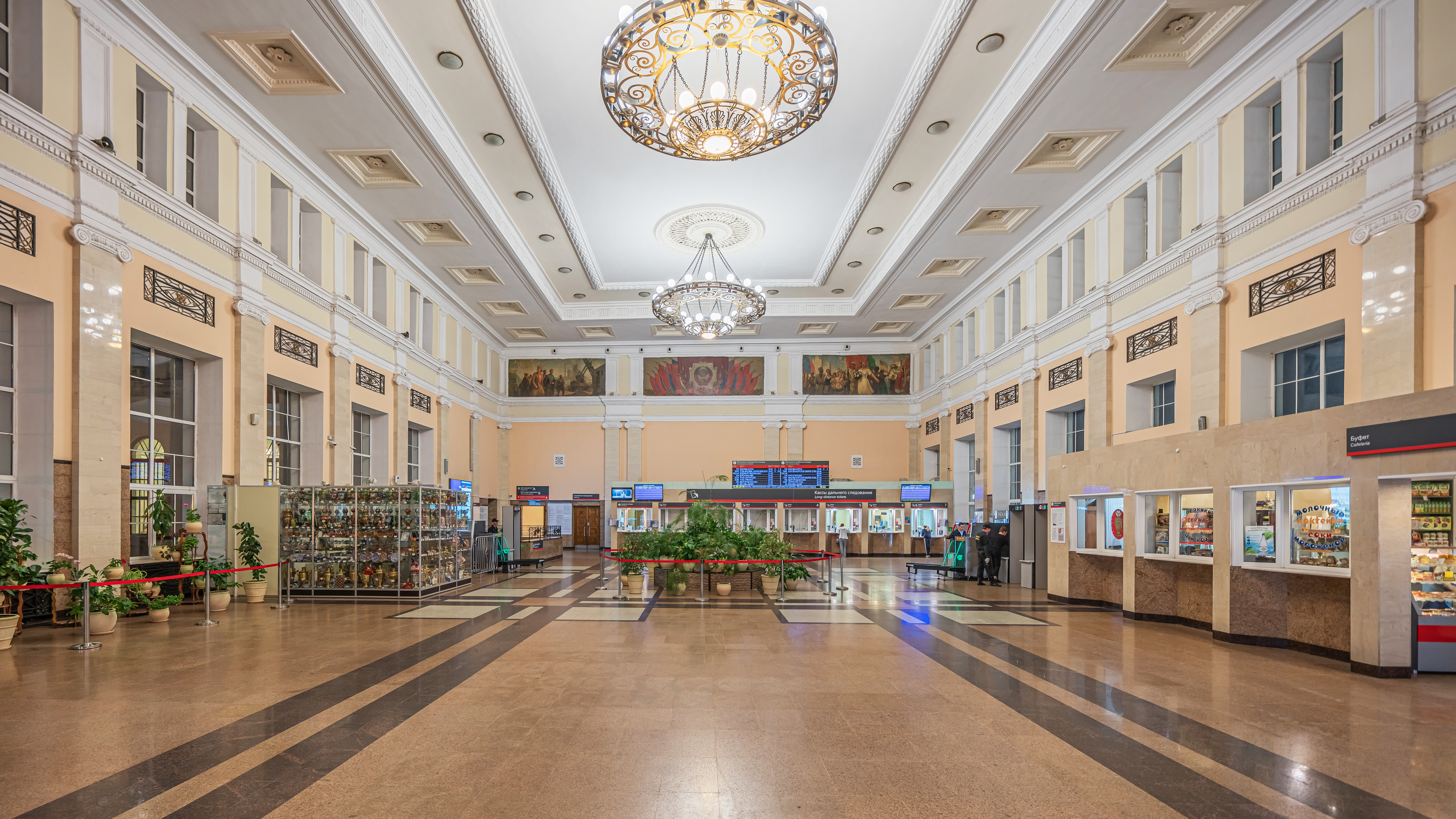
Interior

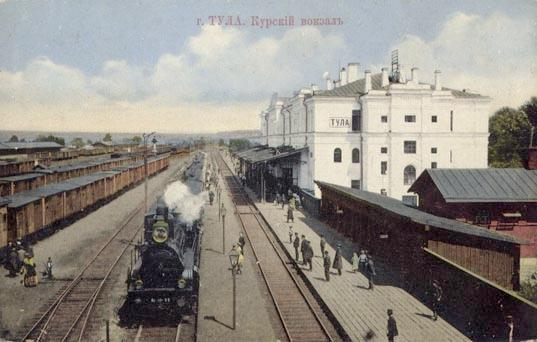
The rail terminal in 1913
