= Penyagino railway station =

Railway in Moscow, Russia

Penyagino Пенягино
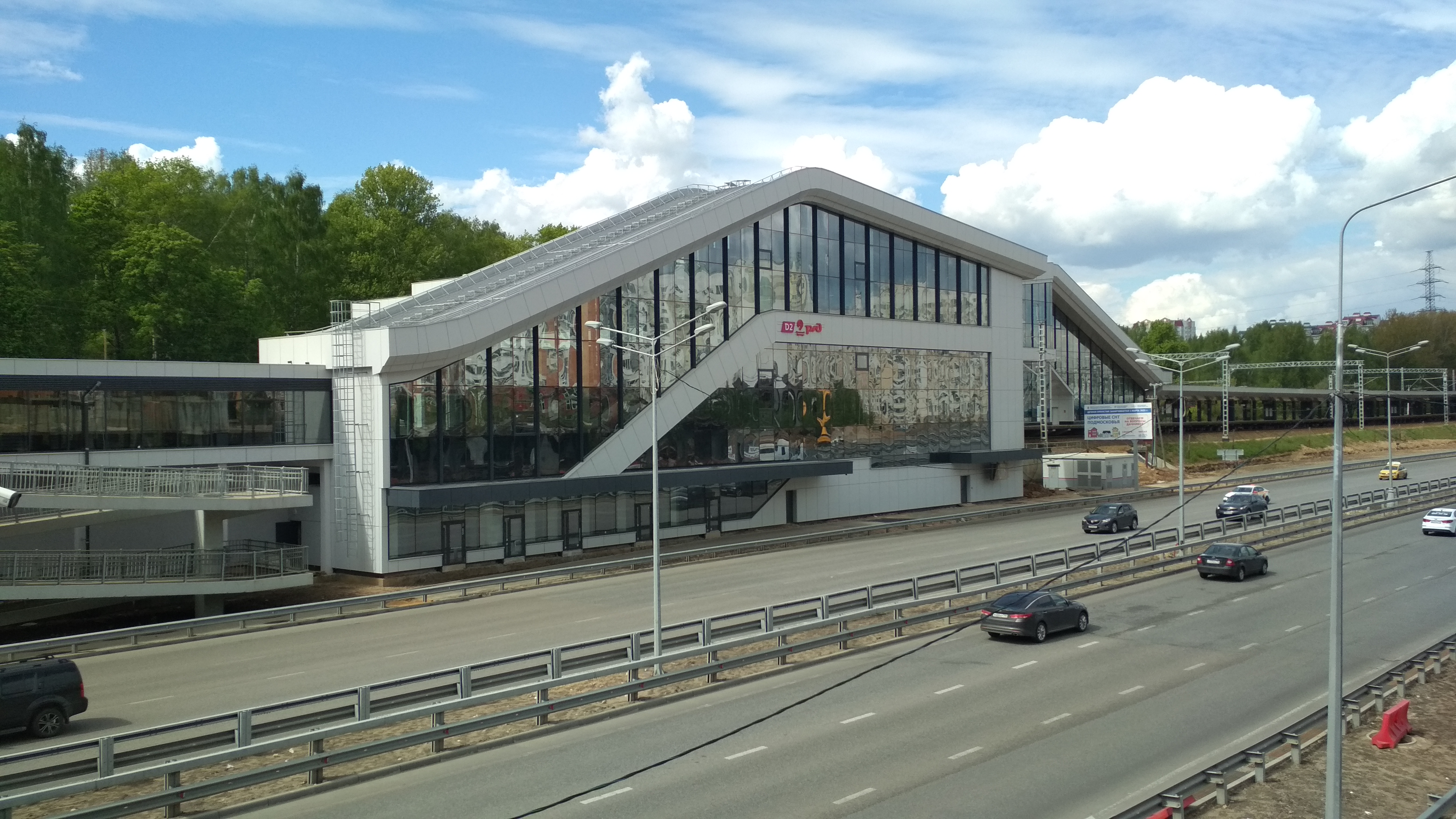

General information
- Location: Moscow; Russia
- Coordinates: 55.8230°N 37.3612°E
- System: Moscow Railway platform
- Owner: Russian Railways
- Operator: Moscow Railway

History
- Opened: 2019

Services
Preceding station	Moscow Central Diameters	Following station
Pavshino towards Nakhabino	Line D2	Volokolamskaya towards Podolsk
Preceding station	Russian Railways	Following station
Pavshino towards Shakhovskaya	Rizhsky Suburban	Volokolamskaya towards Moscow Rizhsky
Route map
Location

Penyagino is a railway station of Line D2 of the Moscow Central Diameters in Moscow. It was opened on 24 November 2019.

== Gallery ==
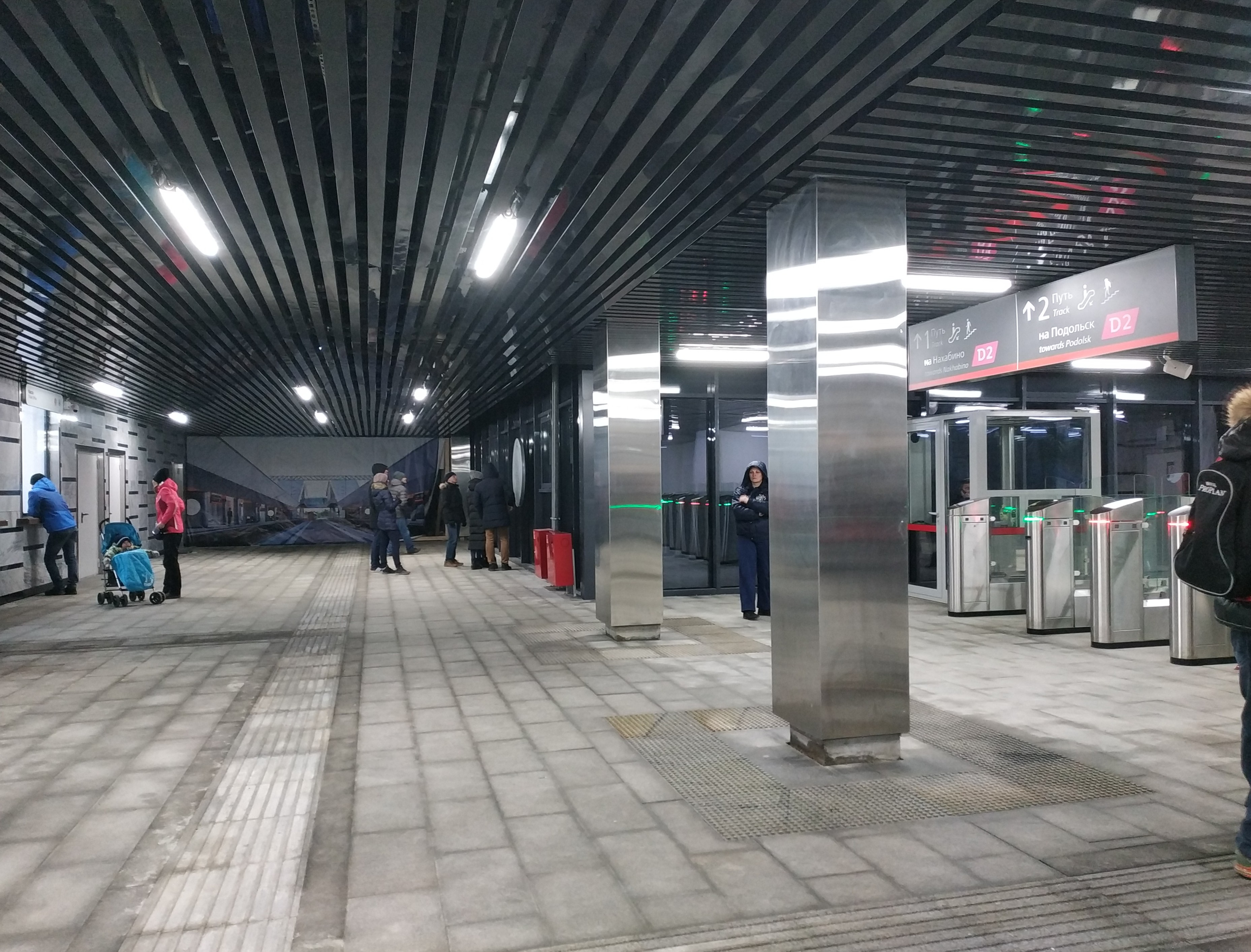

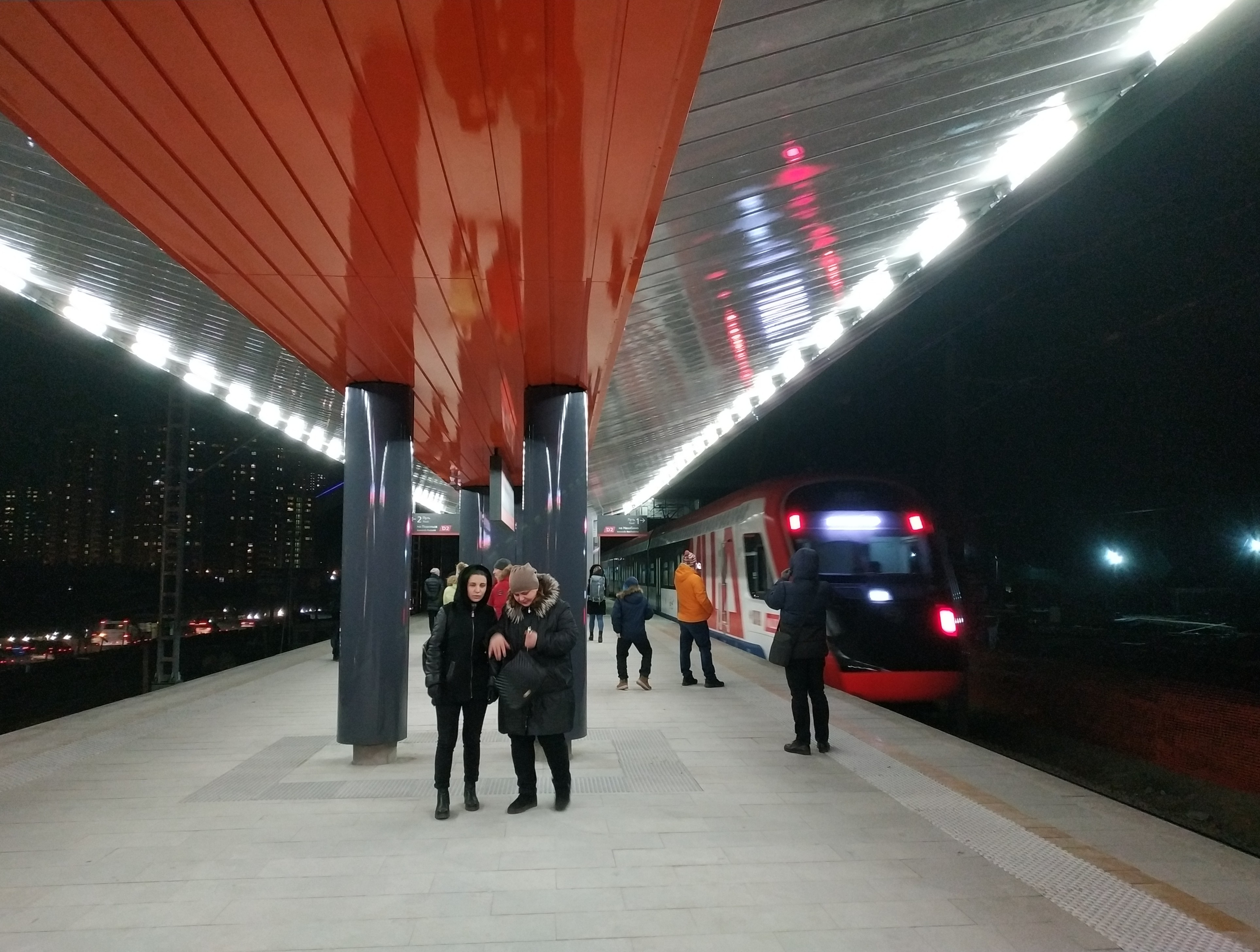
