= Volokolamskaya railway station =

Railway station in Moscow, Russia

Volokolamskaya Волоколамская
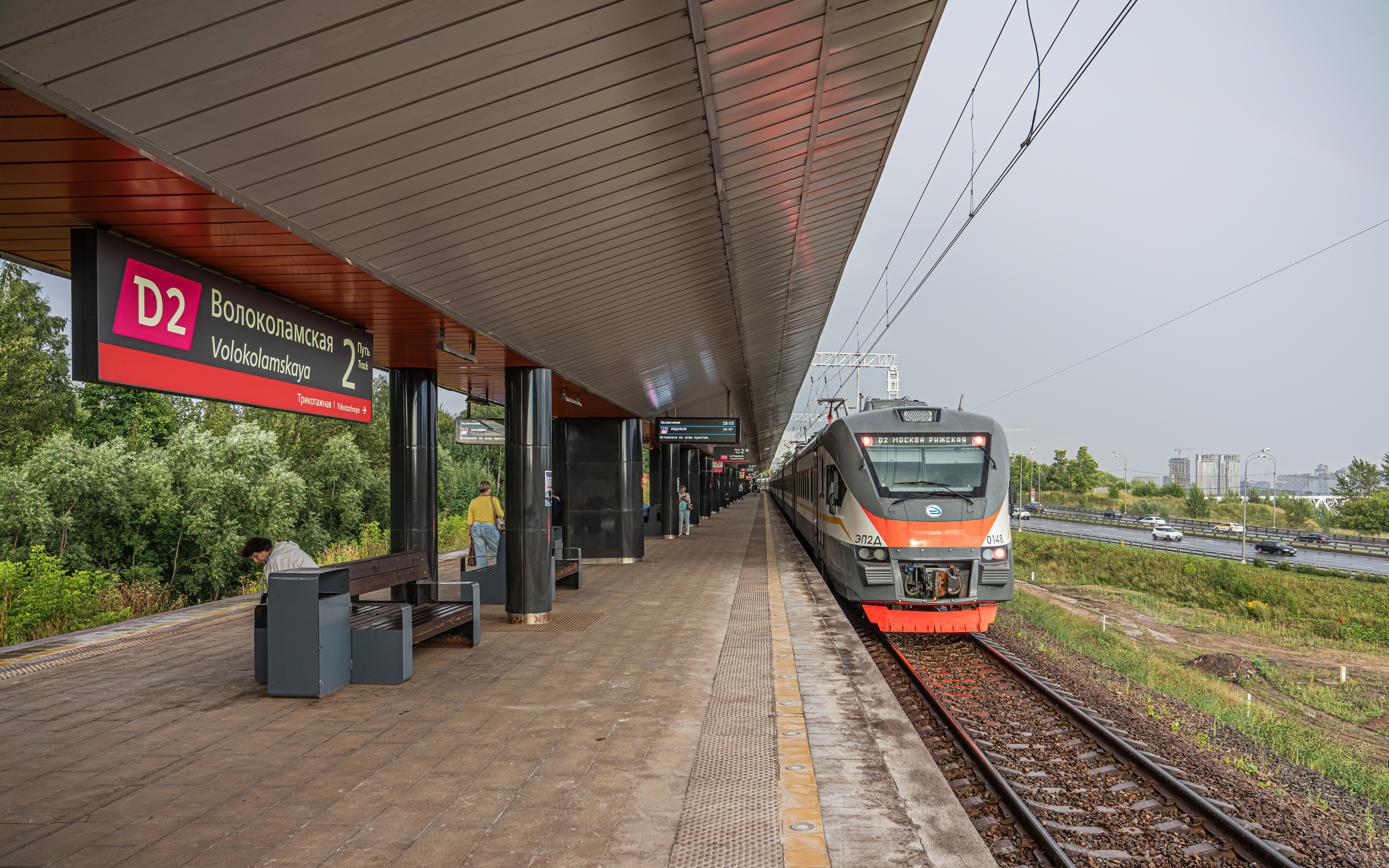

General information
- Location: Moscow; Russia
- Coordinates: 55.8321°N 37.3819°E
- System: Moscow Railway platform
- Owner: Russian Railways
- Operator: Moscow Railway

History
- Opened: 2019

Services
Preceding station	Moscow Central Diameters	Following station
Penyagino towards Nakhabino	Line D2	Trikotazhnaya towards Podolsk
Preceding station	Russian Railways	Following station
Penyagino towards Shakhovskaya	Rizhsky Suburban	Trikotazhnaya towards Moscow Rizhsky
Route map
Location

Volokolamskaya is a railway station of Line D2 of the Moscow Central Diameters in Moscow. It was opened on 23 November 2019.

== Gallery ==
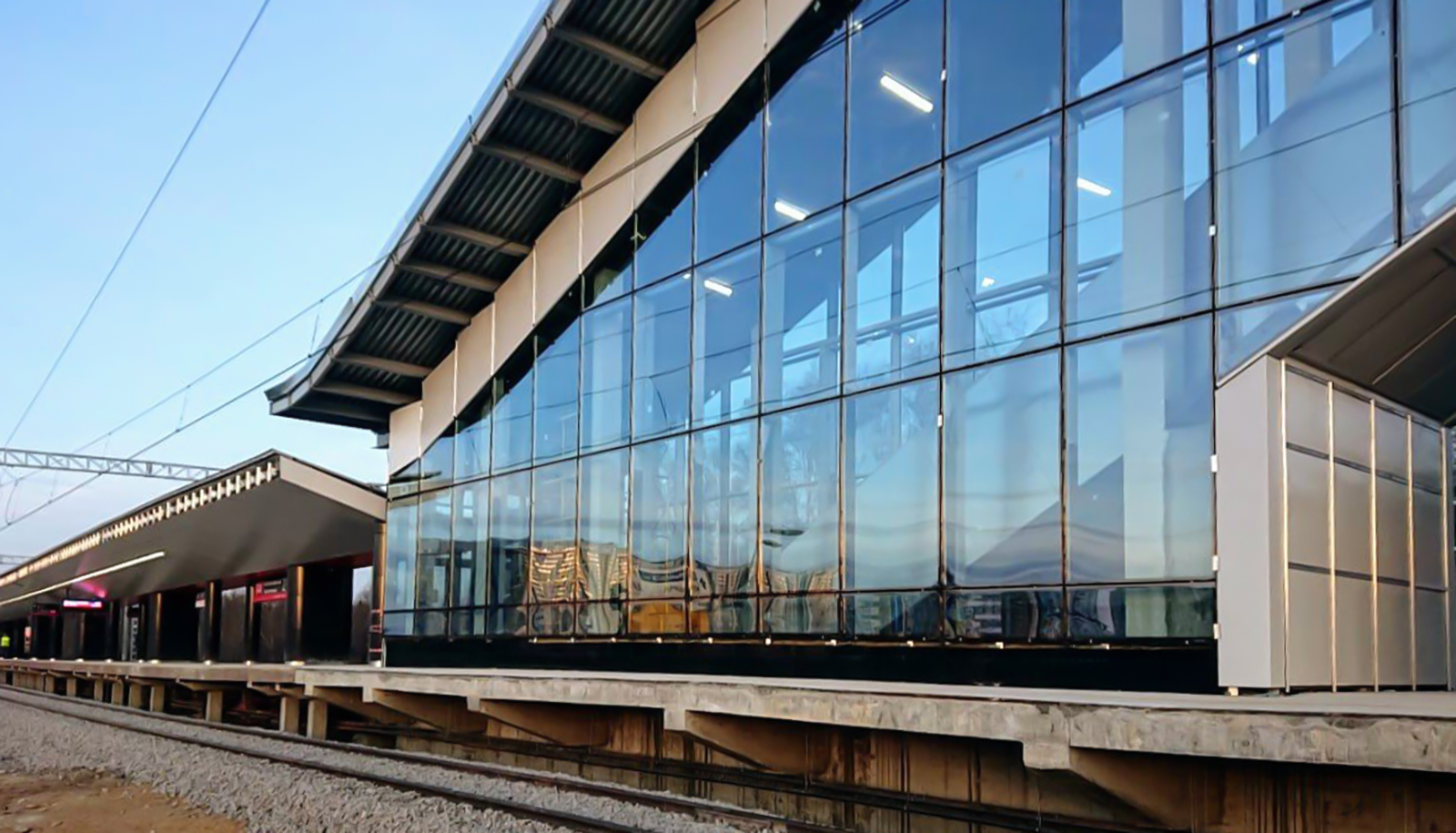
Volokolamskaya railway station in November 2019.

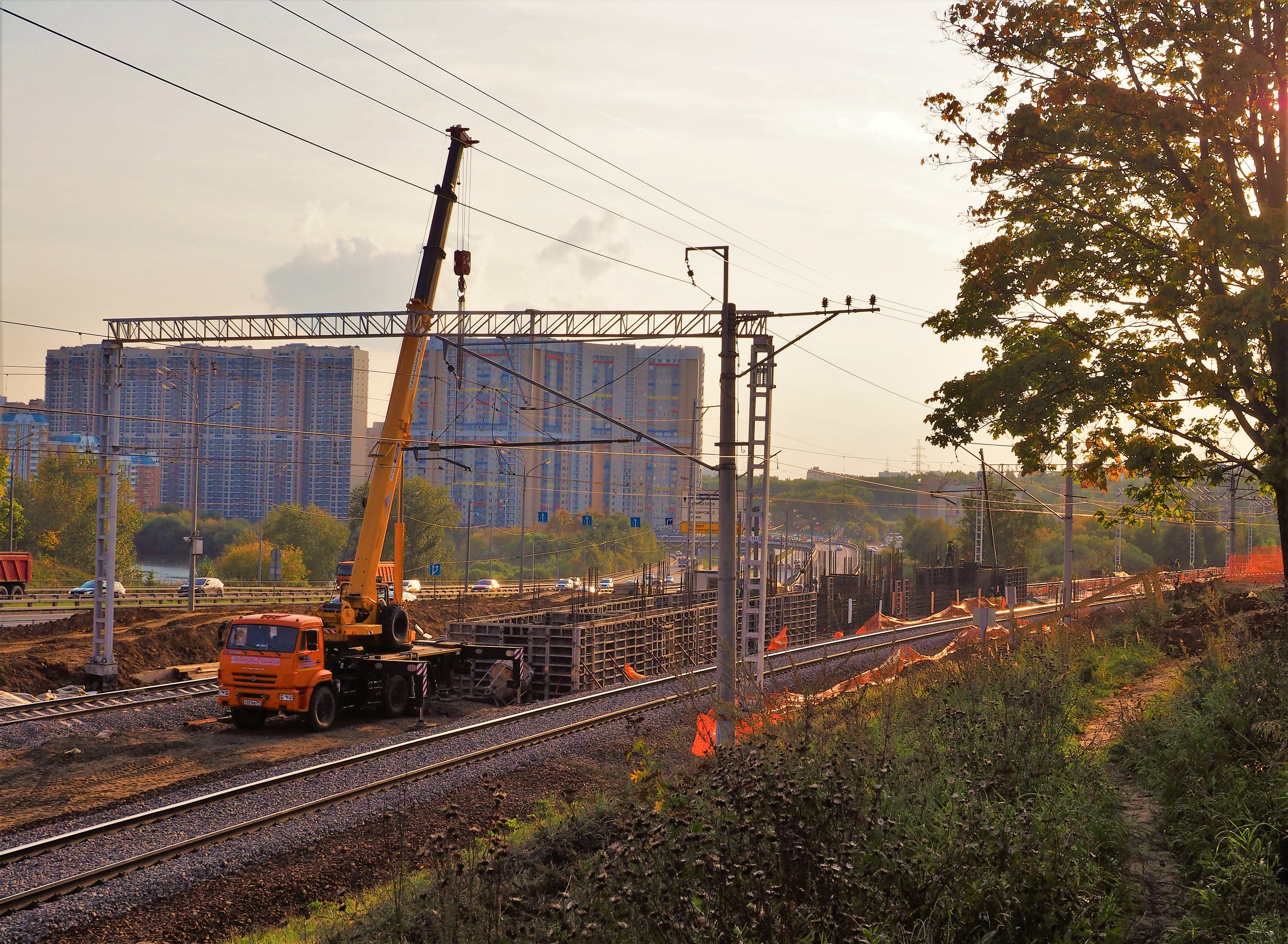
Construction progress as of September 2019.
