= Ryazansky Prospekt =

Moscow Metro station

Ryazansky Prospekt Рязанский проспект
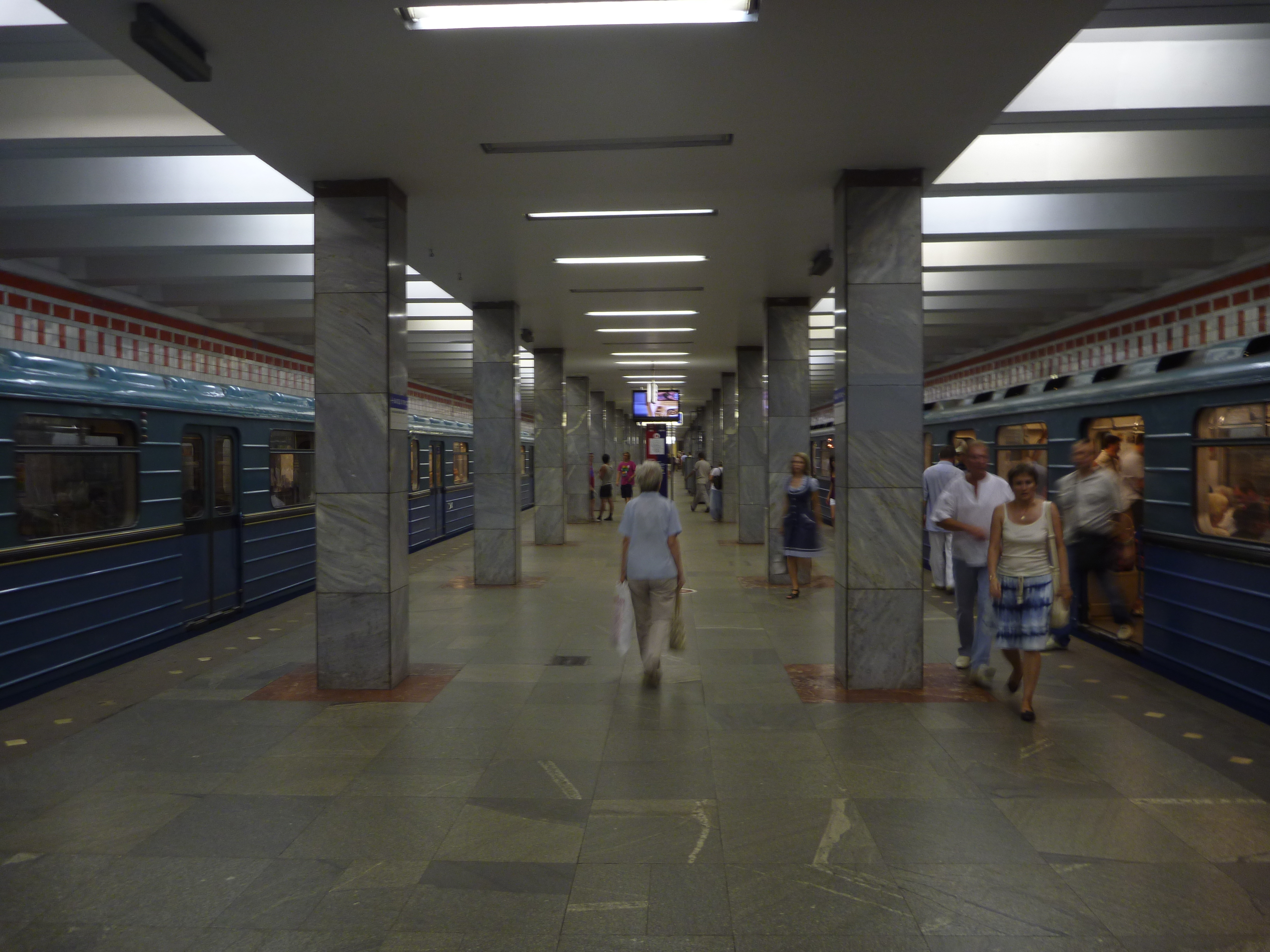

General information
- Location: Ryazansky District; South-Eastern Administrative Okrug; Moscow; Russia
- Coordinates: 55.7170°N 37.7933°E
- System: Moscow Metro station
- Owner: Moskovsky Metropoliten
- Line: Tagansko-Krasnopresnenskaya line
- Platforms: 1 island platform
- Tracks: 2
- Connections: Bus: Вк, Вч, 29, 51, 133, 133к, 143, 159, 169, 208, 279, 725; Trolleybus: 63

Construction
- Depth: 6 metres (20 ft)
- Platform levels: 1
- Parking: No

Other information
- Station code: 111

History
- Opened: 31 December 1966; 59 years ago

Services
Preceding station	Moscow Metro	Following station
Kuzminki towards Planernaya	Tagansko-Krasnopresnenskaya line	Vykhino towards Kotelniki
Route map
Location
- Location within Moscow Metro

Ryazanskiy Prospekt (Russian: Рязанский проспект) is a station on Moscow Metro's Tagansko-Krasnopresnenskaya Line. Opened on 31 December 1966 as part of the Zhdanovsky radius, the station is situated where the line snakes northward and instead of following the Volgogradsky Avenue begins to follow the Ryazansky Avenue which runs several kilometres parallel to it on the north, another avenue and the original road to the city of Ryazan. Like all of the shallow-level stations built at the time, the design is a typical column tri-span, however like Volgogradsky Prospekt the platform has been narrowed. The composition of the station (architects Nina Alyoshina, Yury Vdovin and N. Samoylova) adopted the traditional Ryazan cloth theme to the wall decoration where the white tiles are distinctively articulated at the top with red patterns. Also prominent is the large black level (to keep the proportions) the pillars are faced with grey-indigo marble and the floor is laid with grey and pink granite. Unusually the station has two surface vestibules, each on both sides of the Ryazanskoye Avenue (station is perpendicular to it) as well as access to the Akademika Skryabina street. In March 2002 the station had a modest passenger traffic of 70,410.

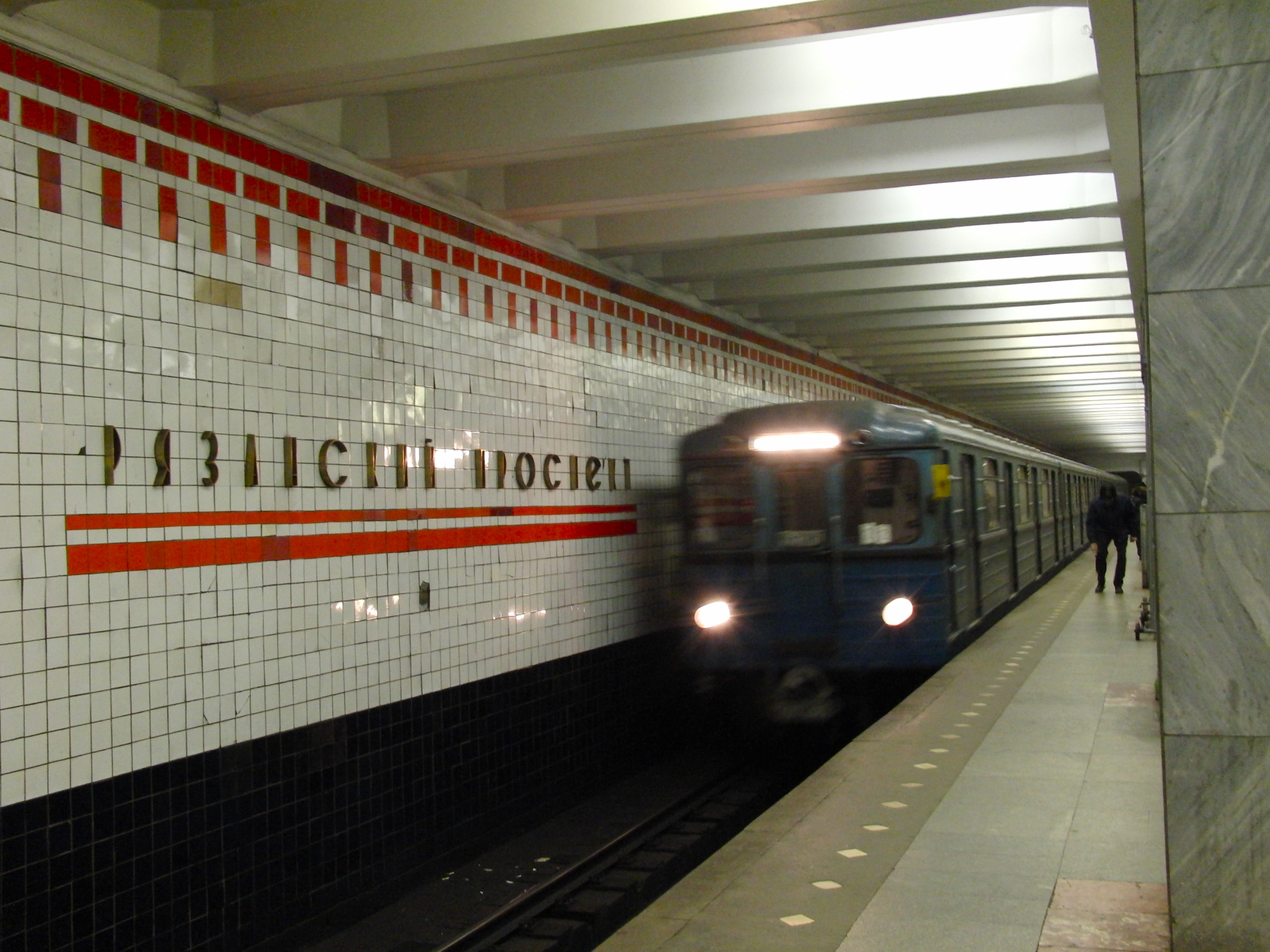
Platform view
