= Tushinskaya (Moscow Metro) =

Moscow Metro station

Tushinskaya Тушинская
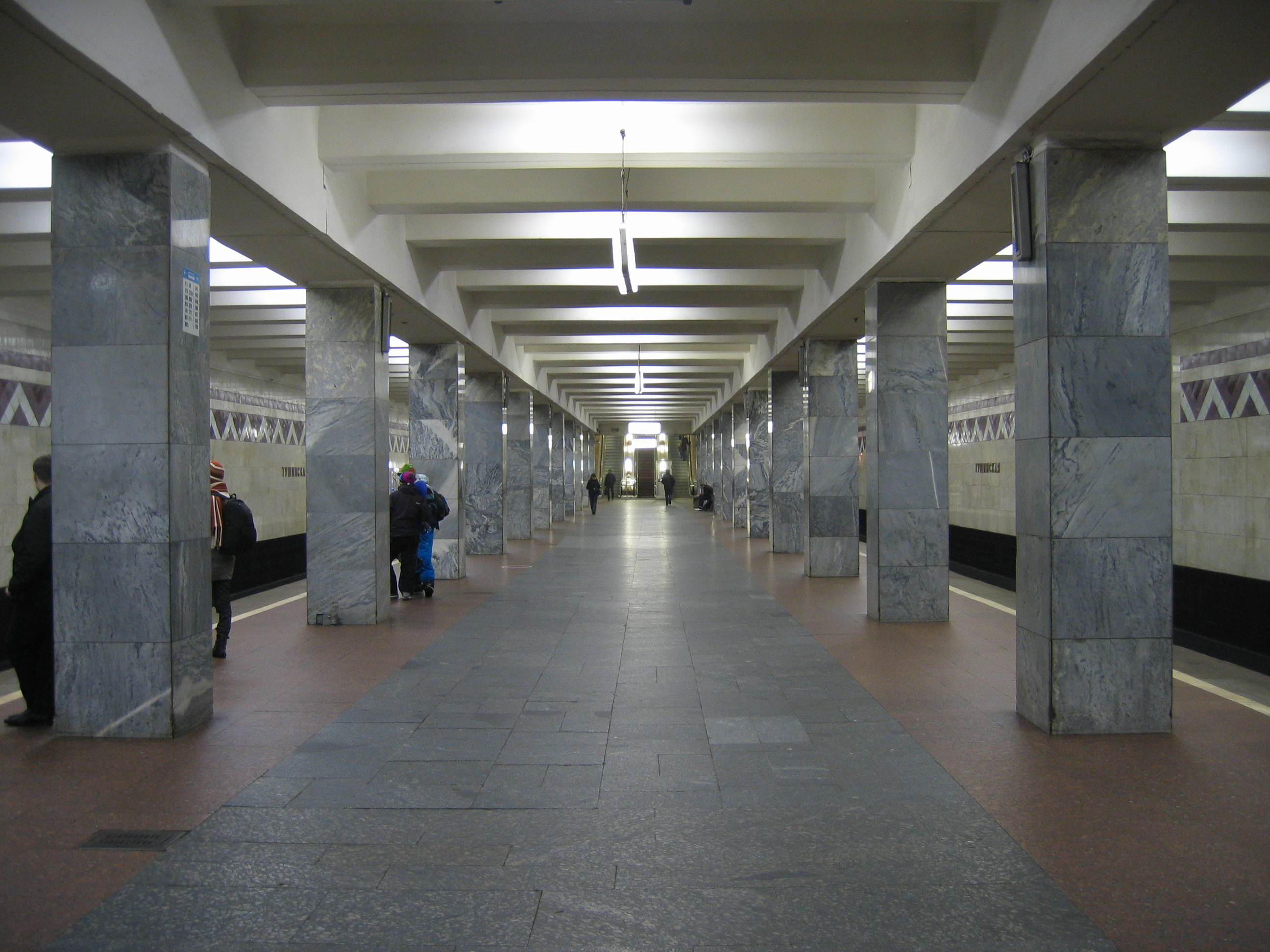

General information
- Location: Pokrovskoye-Streshnevo District; North-Western Administrative Okrug; Moscow; Russia
- Coordinates: 55.8267°N 37.4368°E
- System: Moscow Metro station
- Owner: Moskovsky Metropoliten
- Line: Tagansko-Krasnopresnenskaya line
- Platforms: 1 island platform
- Tracks: 2
- Connections: Bus: Т, 2, 88, 96, 102, 210, 248, 266, 400т, 540, 541, 542, 542п, 549, 568, 575, 614, 631, 640, 678, 741, 777, 904, 930

Construction
- Depth: 10.5 metres (34 ft)
- Platform levels: 1
- Parking: No

Other information
- Station code: 126

History
- Opened: 30 December 1975; 50 years ago

Services
Preceding station	Moscow Metro	Following station
Skhodnenskaya towards Planernaya	Tagansko-Krasnopresnenskaya line	Spartak towards Kotelniki
Route map
Location
- Location within Moscow Metro

Tushinskaya (Russian: Тушинская) is a station on the Tagansko-Krasnopresnenskaya Line of the Moscow Metro. It was designed by I.G. Petukhova and V.P. Kachurinets and opened on 30 December 1975. The station was built to a modified standard design, with grey-blue marble pillars and white marble walls with inlaid zigzag friezes. Tushinskaya is one of the Metro's busiest stations, serving about 111,000 passengers per day according to a 1999 study.

Tushinskaya is located adjacent to Tushinskaya railway station on the Rizhsky suburban railway line and Line D2 of Moscow Central Diameters.

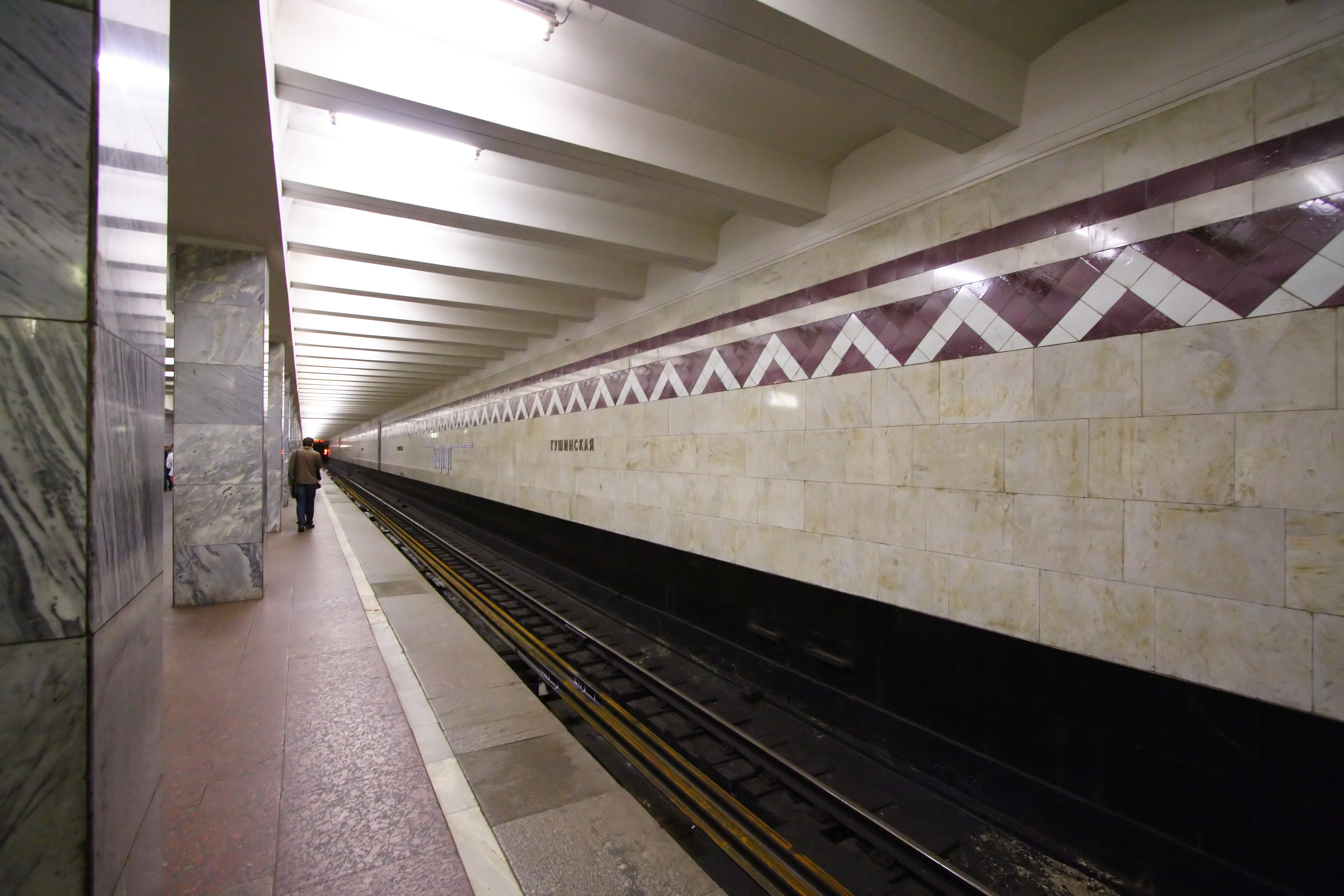
Platform view

Arrival of the train 81-765/767/767 «Moscow» and departure of the train Ezh3/Em508T at the metro station Tushinskaya
