= Vykhino (Moscow Metro) =

Moscow Metro station

Vykhino Выхино
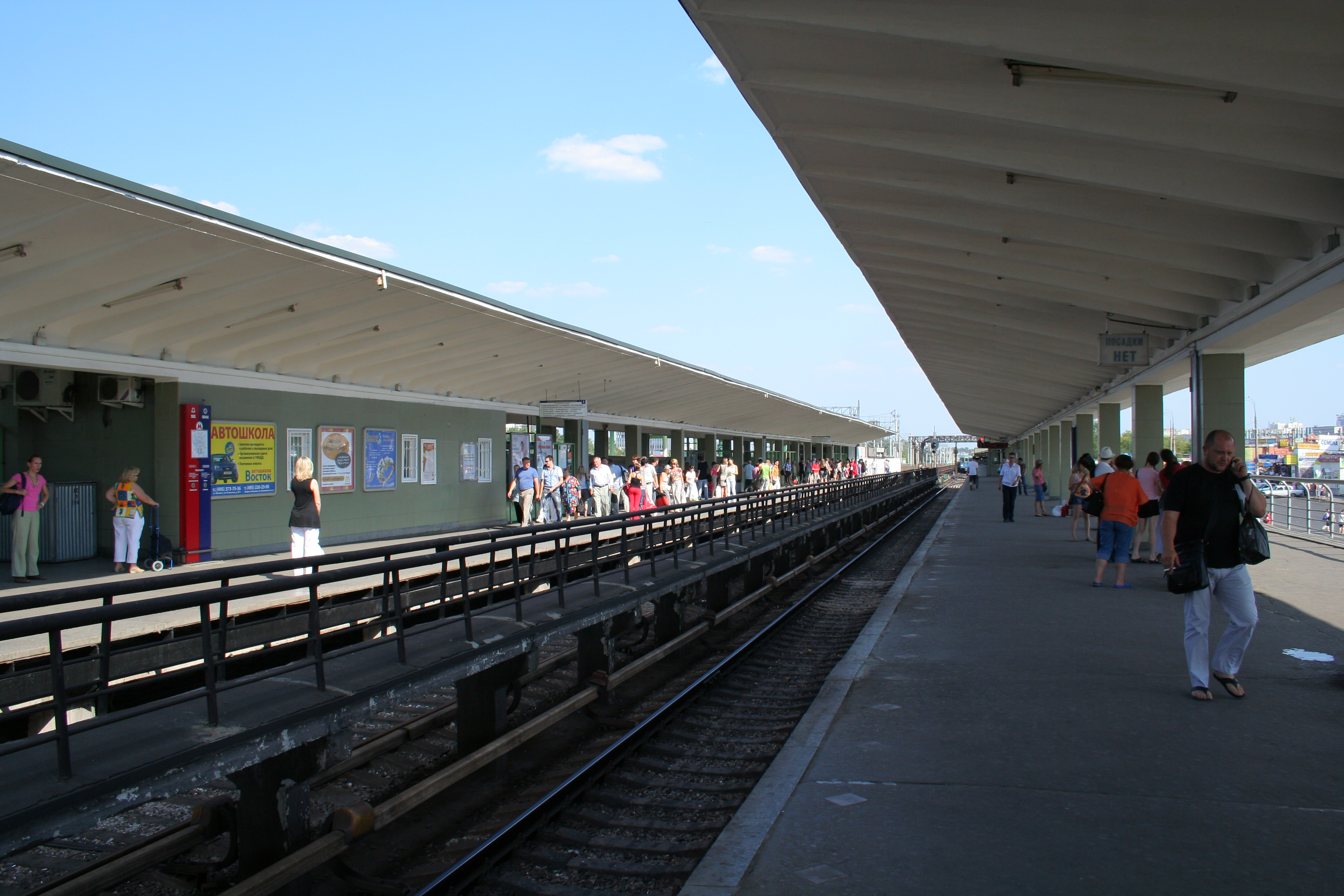

General information
- Location: Vykhino-Zhulebino District; South-Eastern Administrative Okrug; Moscow; Russia
- Coordinates: 55.7156°N 37.8181°E
- System: Moscow Metro station
- Owner: Moskovsky Metropoliten
- Line: Tagansko-Krasnopresnenskaya line
- Platforms: 2 side platforms
- Tracks: 2
- Connections: Bus: 169, 177, 184, 197, 209, 232, 247, 285, 602, 615, 620, 669, 697, 706, 722, 731, 747, 772, 772к, 821, 956, t30 Trolleybus: 64

Construction
- Structure type: Ground-level
- Platform levels: 1
- Parking: No

Other information
- Station code: 110, VKh

History
- Opened: 31 December 1966; 59 years ago
- Former names: Zhdanovskaya

Services
Preceding station	Moscow Metro	Following station
Ryazansky Prospekt towards Planernaya	Tagansko-Krasnopresnenskaya line	Lermontovsky Prospekt towards Kotelniki
Route map
Location
- Location within Moscow Metro

Vykhino (Russian: Выхино) is a station on Moscow Metro's Tagansko-Krasnopresnenskaya line. Opened on 31 December 1966 as the final part of the Zhdanovsky Radius, the station was the southeastern terminus of the line until 9 November 2013, when the extension to Lermontovsky Prospekt and Zhulebino was opened. The metro station is part of a multi-modal transfer hub, which also consists of the mainline suburban railway (Kazanskoye direction).

Originally, the station (as well as the line) was called Zhdanovskaya (Russian: Ждановская) after Soviet revolutionary and politician Andrei Zhdanov. However, in 1988 the station was renamed for the village of Vykhino that was absorbed by Moscow in 1960.

== History ==
Originally designed by A. Strelkov and V. Cheremin, the whole complex has four platforms, two of which are island platforms. The railway uses four out of the six tracks, while the metro uses the other two. It is the only station where is impossible to get from one platform to another without leaving the metro. Two pedestrian subways exist for the transfer between platforms (the transfer complex is above ground level and passengers must ascend to get onto the platforms). Direct railway to metro connections is only possible from Moscow-bound mainline trains onto centre-bound metro trains, where the combined platform is divided lengthwise between the metro and the railway. To transfer in the opposite direction, the subways must be used.

When the transfer complex was built, long-term passenger load was underestimated. As a result, Vykhino became the busiest and most crowded station of the metro system, due to its position at the edge of Moscow, near many highly populated areas in the hinterland. In addition to the railway traffic, Vykhino also has a large bus station nearby and many passengers from the surrounding Moscow Oblast travel to central Moscow via Vykhino. As a result, the station has some of the largest passenger numbers of the metro network — 176,629 passengers per day at the start of 2009. There is a so-called "effect Vykhino" ("Эффект Выхино" in russian): trains arriving at the station at rush hour are filled up to the extent that at all the next stations, until junction with Line 5, new passengers cannot fit into the train at all. At morning rush hour, each third train does not board at this and the following Ryazansky Prospekt stations to pick up passengers at Kuzminki station with good bus service.

Initially, the railway commuter passenger trains stopped just outside the metro pavilion. However, since the early 1990s, they have been making longer journeys well beyond the metro trains' arrival zone, and most of the passengers were forced to walk a train's length. By the early 2000s, it was clear that the transfer point needed significant reconstruction. In 2004 the station was closed to mainline trains (passengers were told to use the Kazansky railway station instead). During this time the old 1960s concrete hinged roofs on the railway platforms were knocked down. These were replaced with modern light green and white transparent roofs with decorative features. The stairwells from the subways were covered with separate pavilions where turnstiles were inserted, and the concrete floor was repaved with stone. The combined metro and railway platform were re-divided along the width where a pavilion was built. Thus the centre-bound metro platform was nearly trebled in area (accounting for the dismantled ticket offices as well), and safety walls were installed on the railway side. The metro part of the station kept its hinged roofs, but these were wholly repainted, and the crude lighting elements in the hinges were replaced with newer ones so giving the platform a cleaner look. The subways were also widened and cleaned up with the old tile work replaced by marble. Additional subway was built as well. The complex was re-opened to the public on 2 October 2004.

Behind the station is a surface cross junction used for reversal and the tracks lead on to the Vykhino depot.

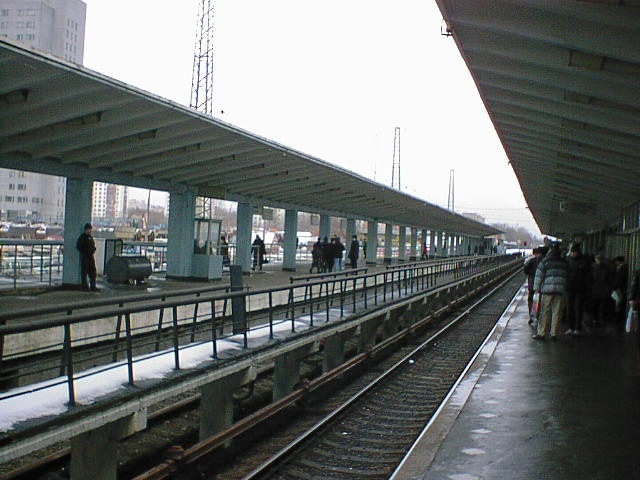
Platforms before reconstruction

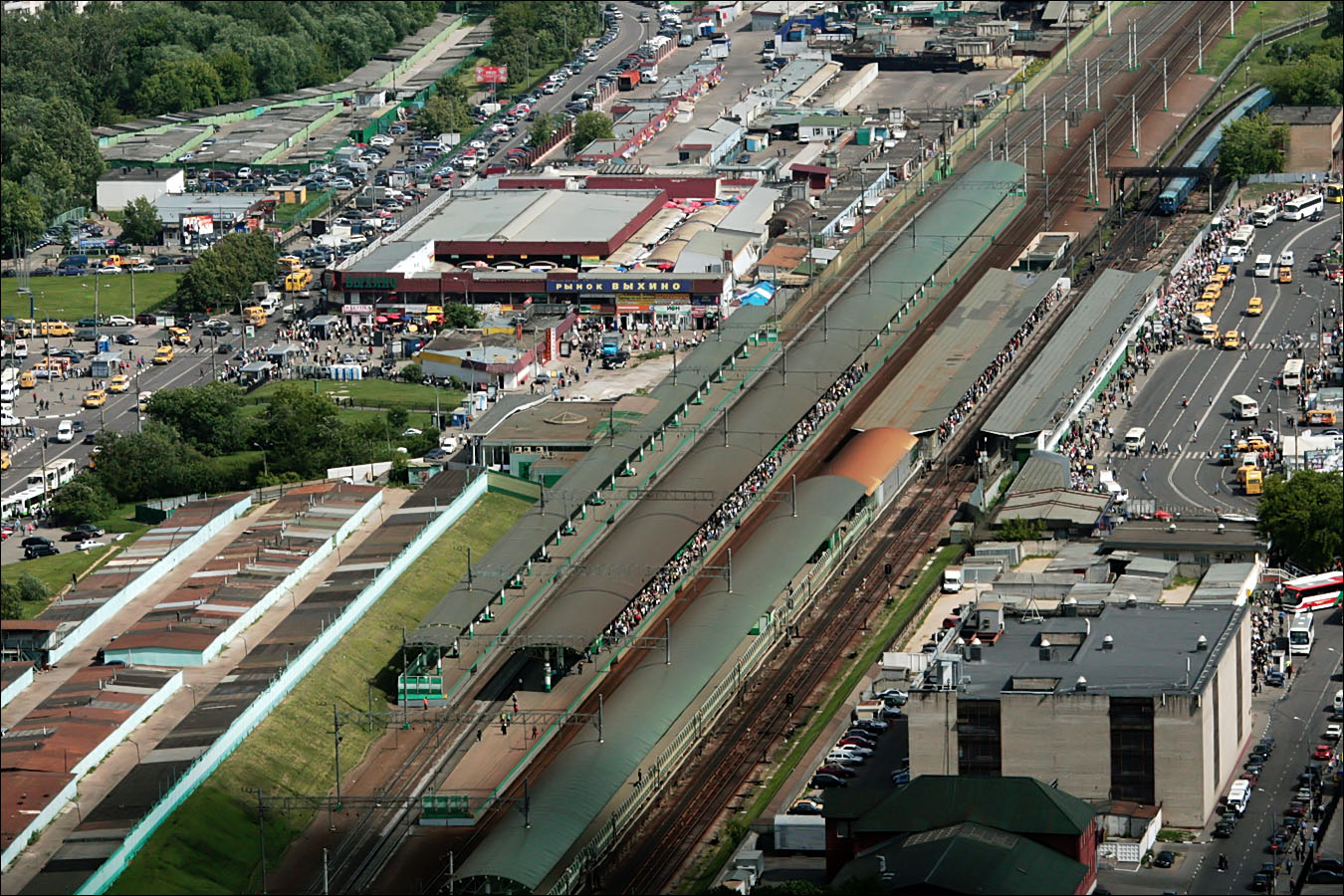
Aerial view
