= Volgogradsky Prospekt (Moscow Metro) =

Moscow Metro station

Volgogradsky Prospekt Волгоградский проспект
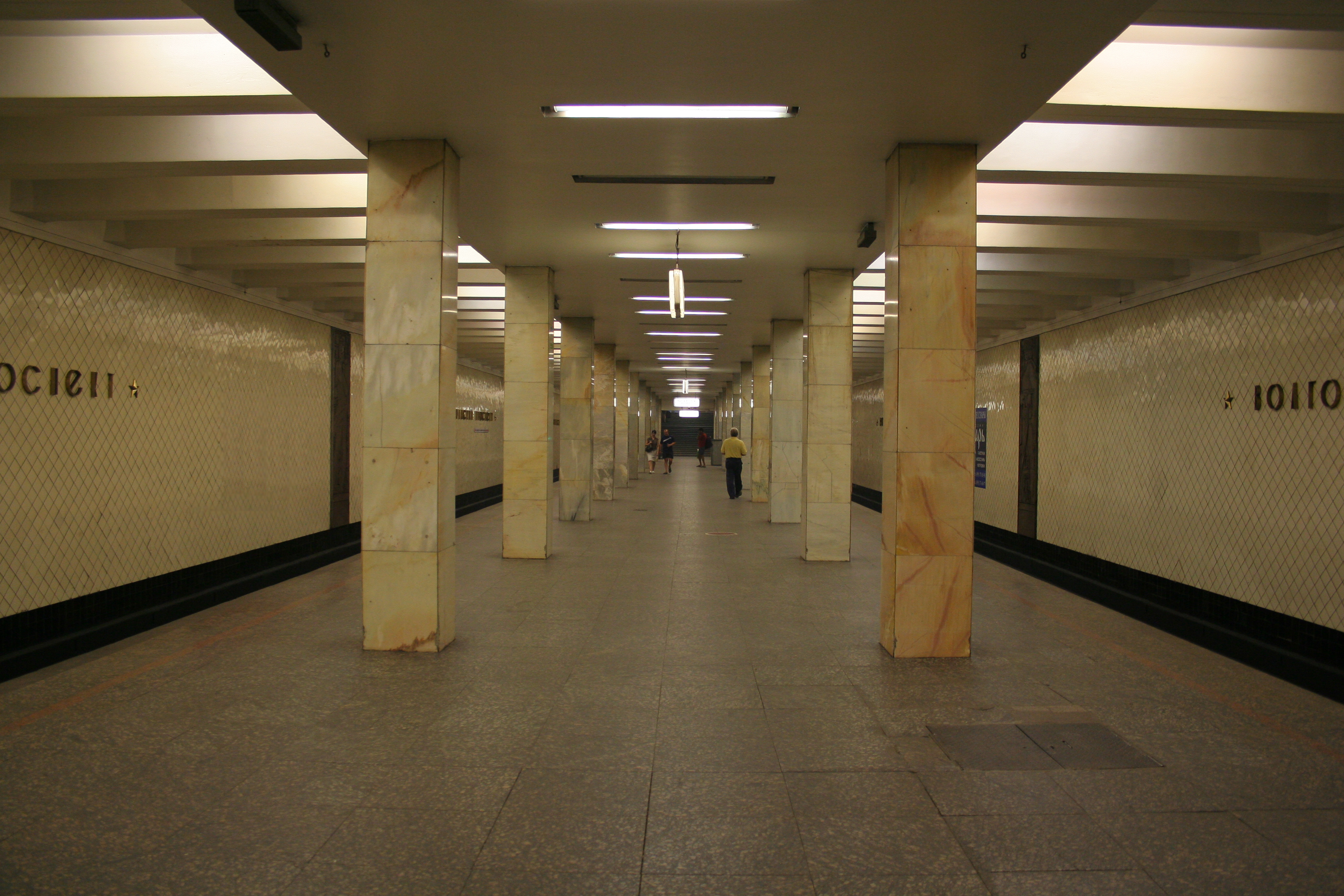

General information
- Location: Nizhegorodsky District; South-Eastern Administrative Okrug; Moscow; Russia
- Coordinates: 55.7253°N 37.6869°E
- System: Moscow Metro station
- Owner: Moskovsky Metropoliten
- Line: Tagansko-Krasnopresnenskaya line
- Platforms: 1 island platform
- Tracks: 2
- Connections: Bus: 99, 186; Trolleybus: 27

Construction
- Depth: 8 metres (26 ft)
- Platform levels: 1
- Parking: No

Other information
- Station code: 114

History
- Opened: 31 December 1966; 59 years ago

Services
Preceding station	Moscow Metro	Following station
Proletarskaya towards Planernaya	Tagansko-Krasnopresnenskaya line	Tekstilshchiki towards Kotelniki
Out-of-station interchange
Novokhokhlovskaya anticlockwise / outer	Moscow Central Circle transfer at Ugreshskaya	Dubrovka clockwise / inner
Route map
Location
- Location within Moscow Metro

Volgogradsky Prospekt (Russian: Волгоградский проспект) is a Moscow Metro station in the Nizhegorodsky District, South-Eastern Administrative Okrug, Moscow. It is on the Tagansko-Krasnopresnenskaya Line, between Proletarskaya and Kuzminki stations. Volgogradsky Prospekt was opened on 31 December 1966 as part of the Zhadovsky radius and is named after the nearby Avenue that leads on from the centre of Moscow into an intercity highway all the way to the southwest of Russia, although not directly to Volgograd. The station was built to a slight modification of the standard 1960s pillar-trispan decoration showing the first signs of innovative design, as architects V. Polikarpova and A. Marova did. The platform is narrowed (as the station was never designed to carry large passenger crowds). The white ceramic tiles on the walls are arranged on 45 degrees to the platform and are decorated with metallic artworks out of anodized aluminium depicting the Battle of Stalingrad (artist E. Ladygin). The pillars are faced with white marble whilst the floor with grey granite. The station has two underground vestibules with glazed concrete pavilions which allow passengers access to the Talalikhin and Novostapovskaya streets as well as directly to the AZLK automobile plant.

There are future plans to construct a transfer station with the same name to the Nekrasovskaya and Troitskaya lines when they fusion together.

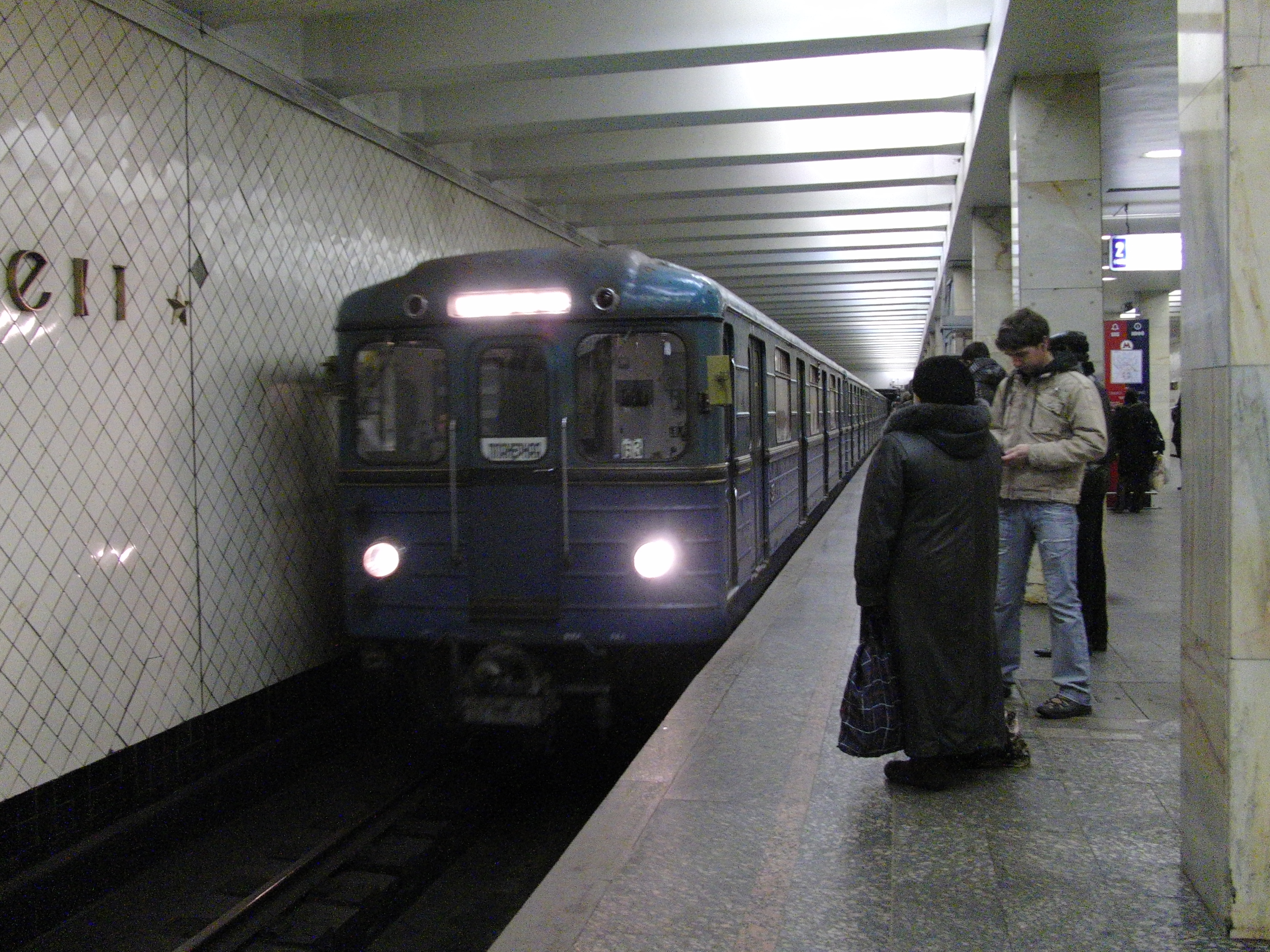
Station Platform
