= Shchukinskaya =

Moscow Metro station

Shchukinskaya Щукинская
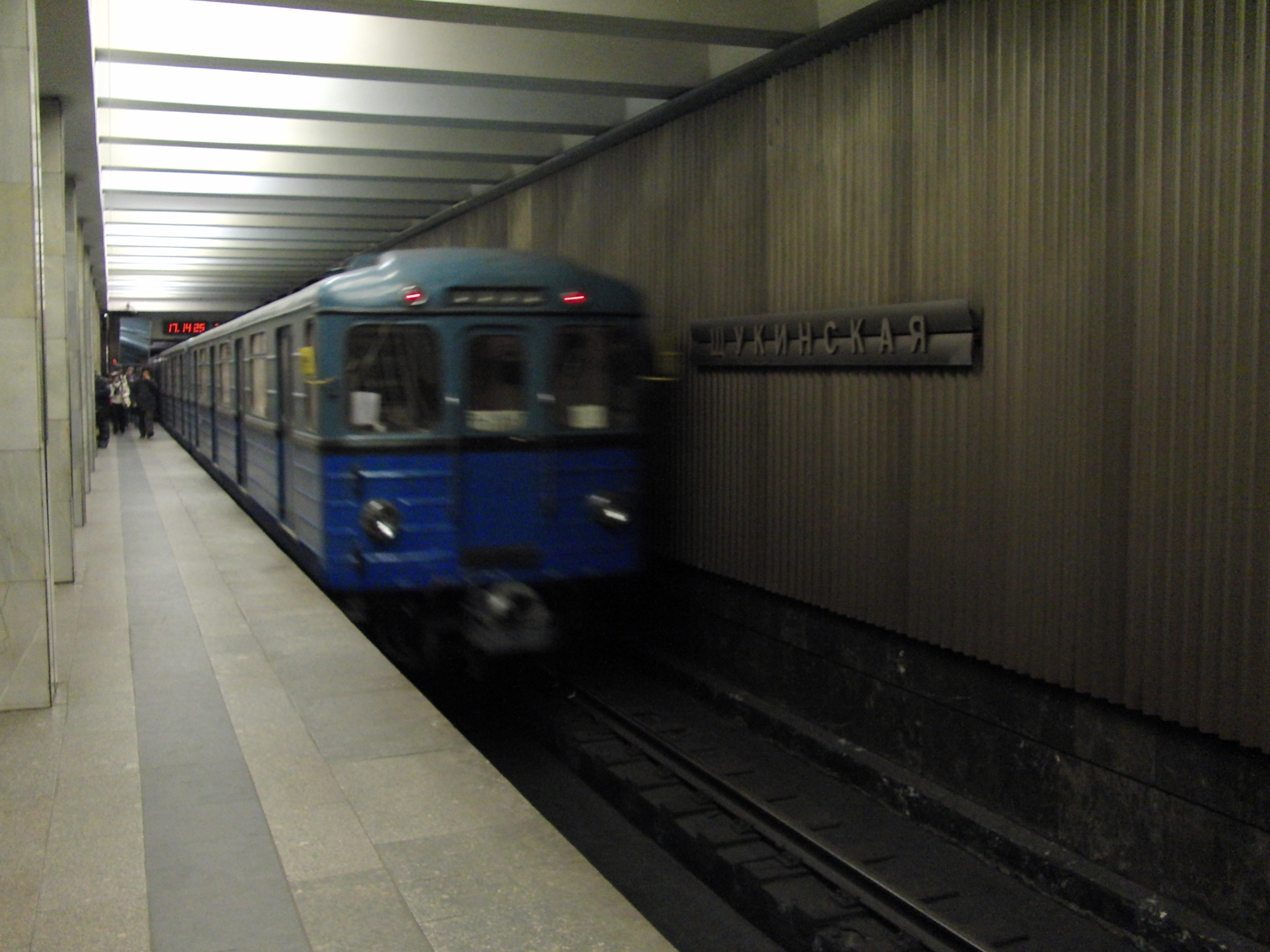

General information
- Location: Shchukino District; North-Western Administrative Okrug; Moscow; Russia
- Coordinates: 55.8086°N 37.4641°E
- System: Moscow Metro station
- Owner: Moskovsky Metropoliten
- Line: Tagansko-Krasnopresnenskaya line
- Platforms: 1 island platform
- Tracks: 2
- Connections: Bus: 021, 60, 100, 105, 137, 253, 277, 631, 638, 640, 652, 654, 681, 687, 743, 798, 800; Tram: 10, 15, 28, 28к, 30

Construction
- Depth: 13 metres (43 ft)
- Platform levels: 1
- Parking: No

Other information
- Station code: 125

History
- Opened: 30 December 1975; 50 years ago

Services
Preceding station	Moscow Metro	Following station
Spartak towards Planernaya	Tagansko-Krasnopresnenskaya line	Oktyabrskoye Pole towards Kotelniki
Route map
Location
- Location within Moscow Metro

Shchukinskaya (Russian: Щукинская) is a station on the Tagansko-Krasnopresnenskaya Line of the Moscow Metro. Named after the village of Schukino before it was consumed by Moscow and became a municipality in the 1940s, it was opened on 30 December 1975. The design follows the original pillar-trispan (40 columns instead of 26). The pillars are faced with different shades of pinkish marble (from the Ukrainian deposit of Burovshchina) and punctuated by a vertical strip of anodized aluminum on each face. The walls are of corrugated, bronze-coloured aluminum, an alloy of extensive strength and flexibility, adorned with decorative panels. The floor is covered with polished grey granite. The architects were Nina Aleshina, N. Samoylova and M. Alekseev.

During the construction of the extension tunnel Oktyabrskoe Pole – Shchukinskaya a new engineering method was developed. Because the Moscow soil was sandy, the metro tunnels had traditionally been built using the open pit method (i.e. digging from the surface) or by restricting building work from passing under inhabited areas as cave-ins would have been very likely. For the Shchukinskaya tunnel however circular concrete blocks were pressed rather than mounted into the soil, and as this was done rapidly the elements did not have time to develop into heavy pressure and sap into the tunnel. This removed the need for festering a sand-cement mixture into the finish, thereby dramatically increasing the potential speed of construction, and saving on building materials. Another achievement was that no metal was used for the mounting of the tunnel blocks, instead a bitumen mixture formed from the pressure of the boring complex was used to join the blocks. As this was denser than the soil, there was no need for festering of the cement.

The entrances to the station are located near the intersection of Shchukinskaya Ulitsa and Ulitsa Marshala Vasilevskogo.

The station handles 93500 people daily.
