= Spartak (Moscow Metro) =

Moscow Metro station

Spartak Спартак
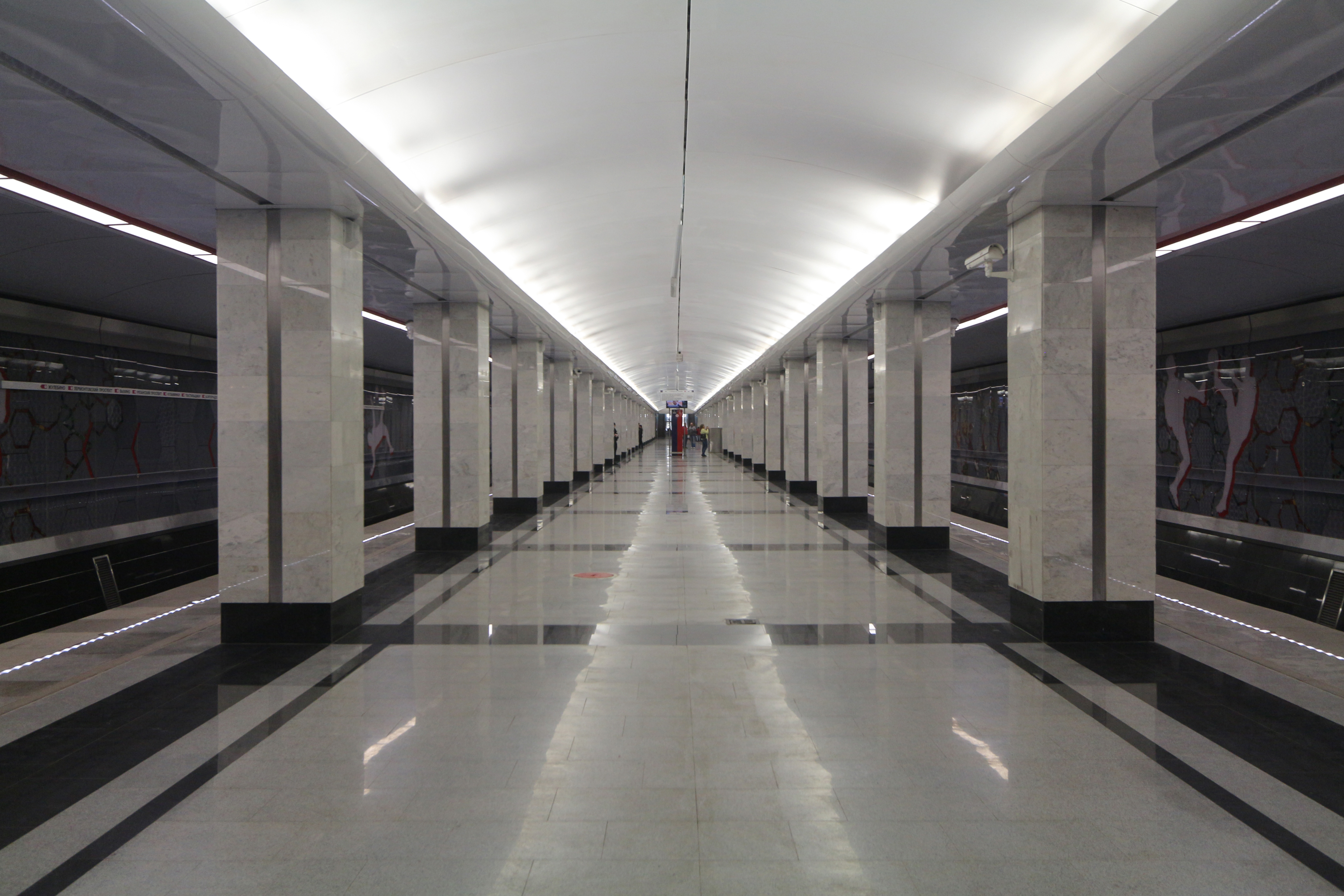

General information
- Location: Pokrovskoye-Streshnevo District; North-Western Administrative Okrug; Moscow; Russia
- Coordinates: 55.8182°N 37.4352°E
- System: Moscow Metro station
- Owner: Moskovsky Metropoliten
- Line: Tagansko-Krasnopresnenskaya line
- Platforms: 1 island platform
- Tracks: 2

Construction
- Structure type: Shallow column triple-span station
- Platform levels: 1
- Parking: No
- Accessible: Yes

History
- Opened: 27 August 2014; 11 years ago
- Former names: Volokolamskaya

Services
Preceding station	Moscow Metro	Following station
Tushinskaya towards Planernaya	Tagansko-Krasnopresnenskaya line	Shchukinskaya towards Kotelniki
Route map
Location
- Location within Moscow Metro

Spartak (Russian: Спартак), previously named Volokolamskaya (Russian: Волоколамская), is a station on the Moscow Metro's Tagansko-Krasnopresnenskaya line, under the former Tushino airfield. It was originally constructed in 1975 as part of the northern extension of the Krasnopresnensky radius but was left unfinished for nearly 40 years. The planned opening of Otkrytiye Arena Stadium, the home ground of FC Spartak Moscow, at the site drove the completion of the station, which opened on 27 August 2014. Consequently, the station's name was changed from the planned Volokolamskaya to Spartak, and the stadium was opened on 5 September of the same year.

== History ==
Moscow's 1960's expansion plans called for a construction of a municipal housing district on the old Tushino airfield, and the station was to serve it. At the time of the original planning, the station was named Aeropolye, after the airfield. However, the planned estate was never built and the station was left unfinished, even though it was structurally complete. Metro travellers could spot the station out the window of the train between Shchukinskaya and Tushinskaya, especially when it was illuminated by a train travelling in the opposite direction. The city restarted construction in 2012 in connection with the construction of Otkrytiye Arena.

== Layout ==
Spartak is a typical pillar-trispan "Novaya Sorokonozhka" (Новая Сороконожка, new centipede) design with staircases at opposite ends. The vestibules were built in 2014, with the northern one being above-ground and the southern one underground.
