= Vykhino =

Vykhino:

- Vykhino-Zhulebino, a district of Moscow
- Vykhino (Moscow Metro)
- Vykhino (locomotive depot) - a locomotive depot of Tagansko-Krasnopresnenskaya Line
- Vykhino (railroad station) - a railroad station of Moscow-Ryazan Railway of Moscow Railway
