= Tekstilshchiki (Tagansko-Krasnopresnenskaya line) =

Moscow Metro station

Tekstilshchiki Текстильщики
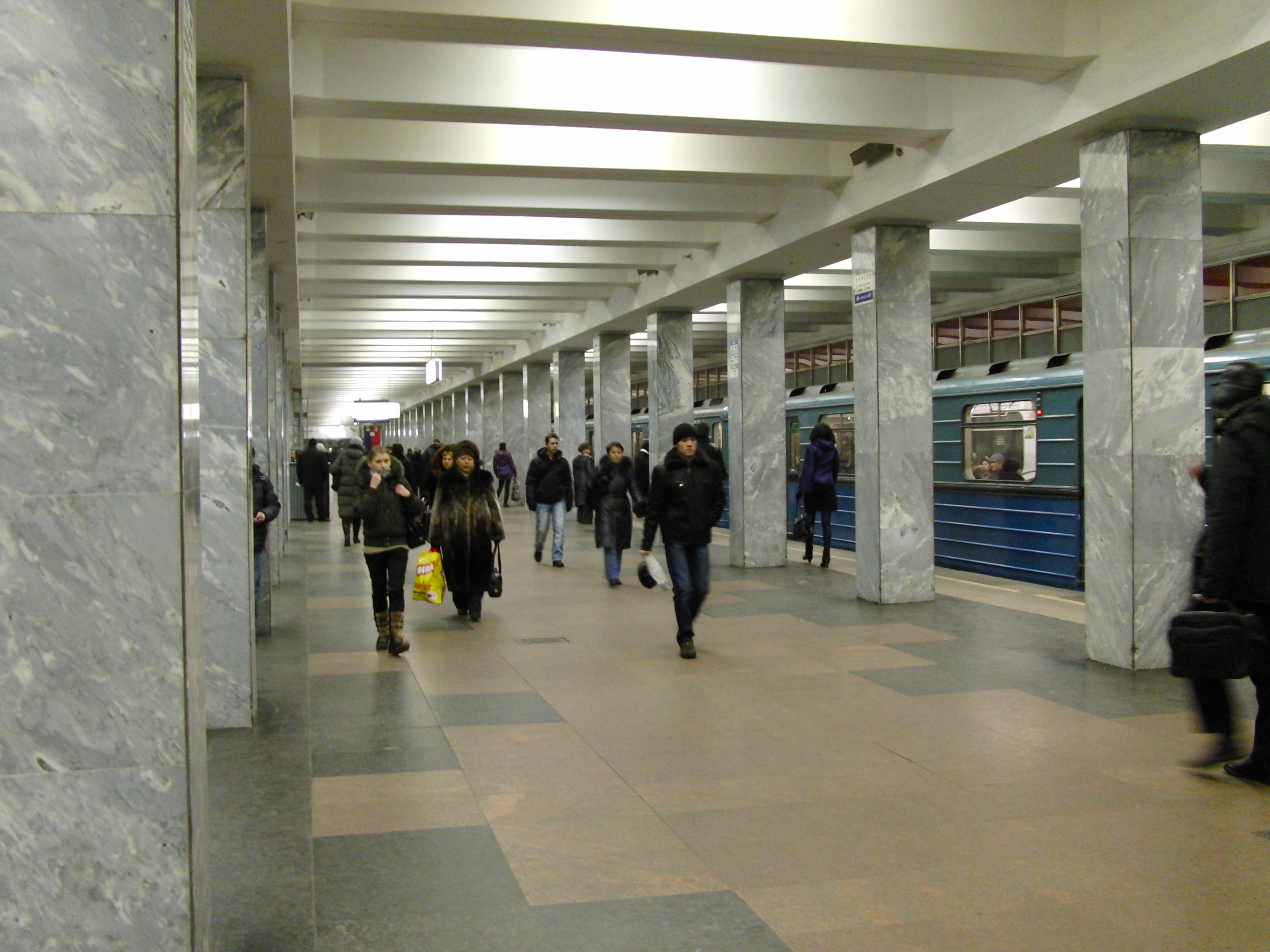

General information
- Location: Tekstilshchiki District; South-Eastern Administrative Okrug; Moscow; Russia
- Coordinates: 55.7088°N 37.7316°E
- System: Moscow Metro station
- Owner: Moskovsky Metropoliten
- Line: Tagansko-Krasnopresnenskaya line
- Platforms: 1 island platform
- Tracks: 2
- Connections: Bus: Вк, Вч, 29, 29к, 54, 74, 99, 159, 161, 193, 228, 623, 633, 650, 703, 725; Trolleybus: 27, 38, 50, 75

Construction
- Platform levels: 1
- Parking: No

Other information
- Station code: 113

History
- Opened: 31 December 1966; 59 years ago

Services
| Preceding station | Moscow Metro | Following station |
|---|---|---|
| Volgogradsky Prospekt towards Planernaya | Tagansko-Krasnopresnenskaya line | Kuzminki towards Kotelniki |
| Nizhegorodskaya anticlockwise / outer | Bolshaya Koltsevaya line transfer at Tekstilshchiki | Pechatniki clockwise / inner |
Route map
Location
- Location within Moscow Metro

Tekstilshchiki (Russian: Текстильщики) is a Moscow Metro station in the Tekstilshchiki District, South-Eastern Administrative Okrug, Moscow. It is on Tagansko–Krasnopresnenskaya line, between Volgogradsky Prospekt and Kuzminki stations. Tekstilschiki was opened on 31 December 1966 as a part of the Zhdanovsky radius. The station is situated next to Tekstilshchiki railway station at the intersection of Volgogradsky avenue and Lyublinskaya street. A transfer to Tekstilshchiki is planned.

== Construction ==
The station was designed by Rimidlav Pogrebnoy and is built to a standard pillar-trispan design. Apart from the grey wavy marble on the pillar and the grey granite floor the station stands out with its walls. Instead of the common ceramic tiles, for the first time in Moscow Metro tempered coloured glass was used of red (top and bottom) and indigo (centre) colours. The glass is held by a cellular aluminium frame.

== Position ==
The distance from the previous station Volgogradsky Prospekt was the longest in the Moscow Metro (3.5 kilometres (2.2 mi)) until 2007, when the Trubnaya station was opened, then this distance became the longest again as the Sretensky Bulvar station was opened, but in 2008 the Strogino station was opened, and the Krylatskoye–Strogino distance became the longest. A part of the distance from Volgogradsky Prospekt is travelled on the surface. The surface section ends just before the station and daylight can be seen in the tunnels. Just outside the tunnel portal is a piston junction and a siding.

The station is located under the platform of the Kursk-bound railway. A direct access to the railway platform is possible from the station's western vestibule. The station's eastern vestibule allows access to the Lyublinskaya street and the Volgogradsky avenue. The entrances are a solid concrete glazed pavilion (architects A. Marova and A. Bogatyreva). Originally the platforms had lanterns showing the edge, later covered by cement.

== Usage ==
The daily passenger traffic for the station is 103,100 passengers.

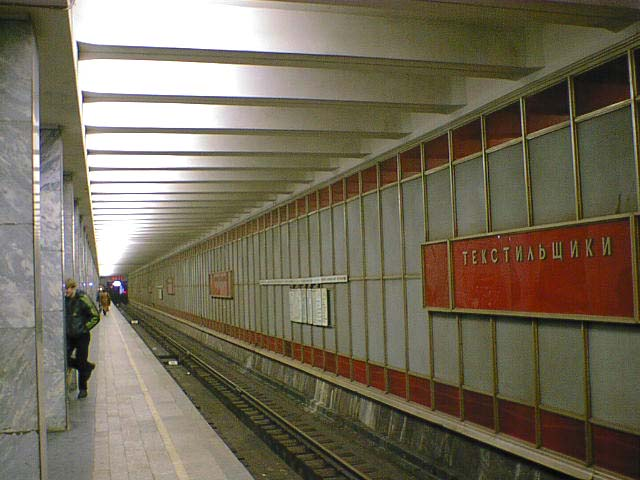
Platform view
