= Skhodnenskaya =

Moscow Metro station

Skhodnenskaya Сходненская
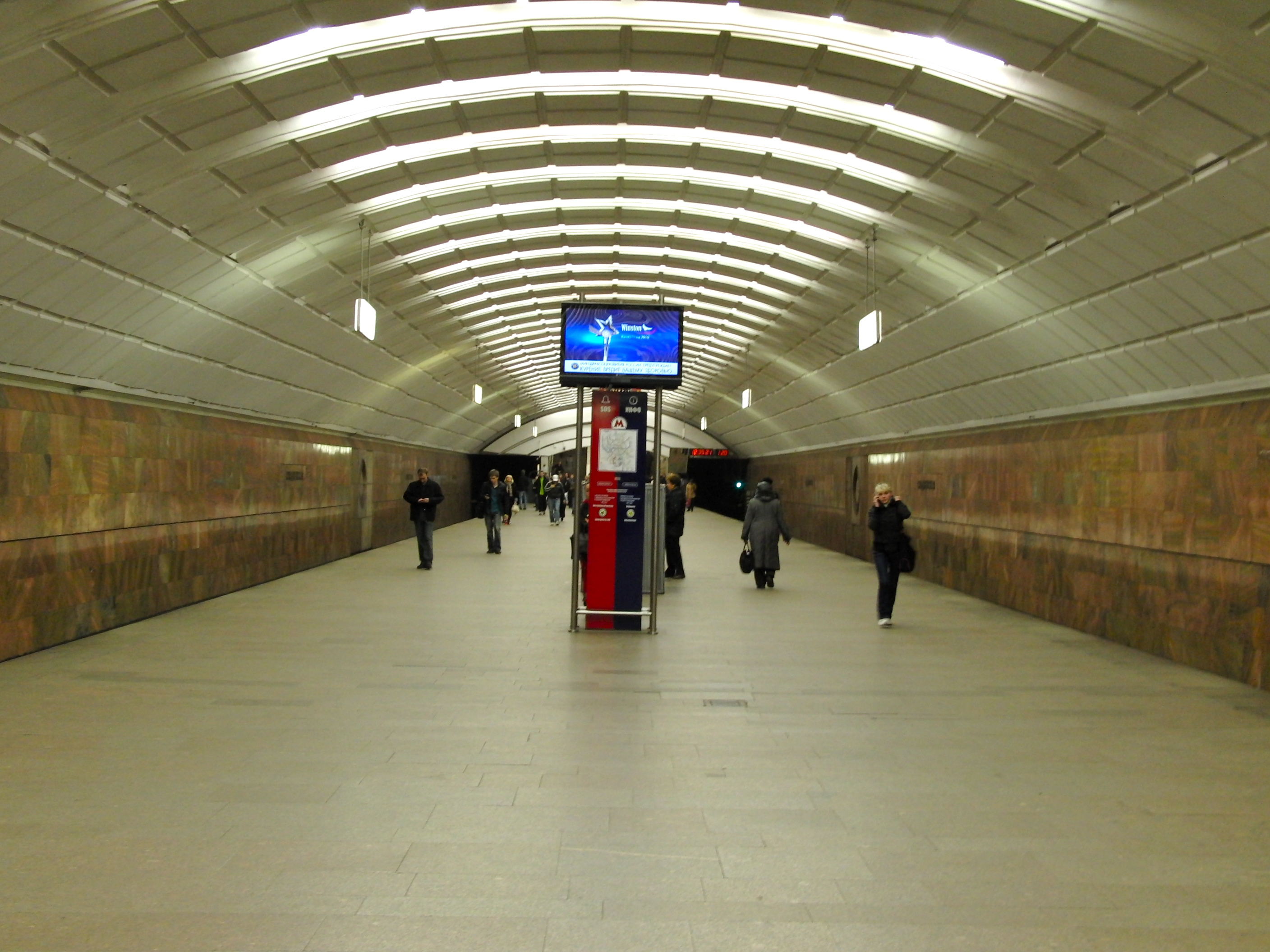

General information
- Location: Severnoye Tushino District and Yuzhnoye Tushino District; North-Western Administrative Okrug; Moscow; Russia
- Coordinates: 55.8505°N 37.4396°E
- System: Moscow Metro station
- Owner: Moskovsky Metropoliten
- Line: Tagansko-Krasnopresnenskaya line
- Platforms: 1 island platform
- Tracks: 2
- Connections: Bus: Т, 43, 96, 199, 267, 678; Tram: 6, 6к

Construction
- Depth: 6 metres (20 ft)
- Platform levels: 1
- Parking: No

Other information
- Station code: 127

History
- Opened: 30 December 1975; 50 years ago

Services
Preceding station	Moscow Metro	Following station
Planernaya Terminus	Tagansko-Krasnopresnenskaya line	Tushinskaya towards Kotelniki
Route map
Location
- Location within Moscow Metro

Skhodnenskaya (Russian: Сходненская) is a station on the Tagansko-Krasnopresnenskaya Line of the Moscow Metro. The station is a single vault, which was a significant engineering achievement and a change from the typical functionality design of the 1960s. Actually, Moscow's history of single vault stations began 40 years prior to Skhodnenskaya with Biblioteka Imeni Lenina which opened along with the Metro itself in 1935. Built to a design of the Paris Métro, however, problems of keeping the structure from collapse and pouring in bitumen called for no repeat of such methods. The second single vault, Aeroport, opened in 1938, was built with the cut and cover method, and was not successful. The delicacy required when preparing and handling heavy monolithic concrete vault blocks was labour-intensive and in that period of industrialisation, was not cost affective.

During the late 1960s following the beginning the deviation from a policy of functionality, engineers returned to the single-vault design. First tested in the Kharkov Metro (hence the name), the design is initiated with a simple cut and cover as a column tri-span after the walls are mounted (and reinforced). The pit is filled with the excavated earth, up to the depth of the vault keystone, shaped into a half-cylinder. From there a metallic armature is placed on the earth, and on it, concrete blocks. Once set, the earth under the completed vault is then re-excavated and work on the station platforms can begin. The exact shape of the dome depends on the hydro-geological conditions of the surrounding location. If hydro-isolation is not required, the walls that erected the dome are incorporated into the design and the appearance is that of a vault lying on top of them. If hydro-isolation is required, the vault extends all the way to the bottom and the station appears like a half-cylinder. In presence of high water pressure from the soil, the walls are not only left outside, but also the vault is forced into a backwards curvature, making the station even more cylindrical.

Skhodnensakaya was the first station in Moscow to be built using this method. Its design incorporated the walls into its construction (being the simplest of the methods). Architects Popov and Fokin were the first to exploit the potential design which gave greater potential than the pillar-trispan. The walls were faced with red marble and adorned with decorative cast-aluminium panels. All signage and light fixtures were attached to the ceiling, keeping the platform free of obstructions. Skhodnenskaya opened on 30 December 1975 as part of the northern extension of the Krasnopresnenskiy Line. The new design proved very popular and was used in all future extensions, or new line segments and in Moscow and other ex-USSR metros had at least some single vaults. This single vault design however, should not be confused with those found in Saint Petersburg Metro, which are built exploiting a different technology.

The station's underground vestibules are interlinked with subways allowing access to the Skhodnenskaya street, named after Skhodnya River, and Yana Rainisa and Khimkinskiy Boulevards. Each day 78,750 people use the station.
