= Zhulebino =

Zhulebino may refer to:

- Zhulebino District, now included in Vykhino-Zhulebino
- Zhulebino (rural locality), a former village
- Zhulebino (Moscow Metro)
