= Lukoil Arena =

Stadium in Moscow, Russia

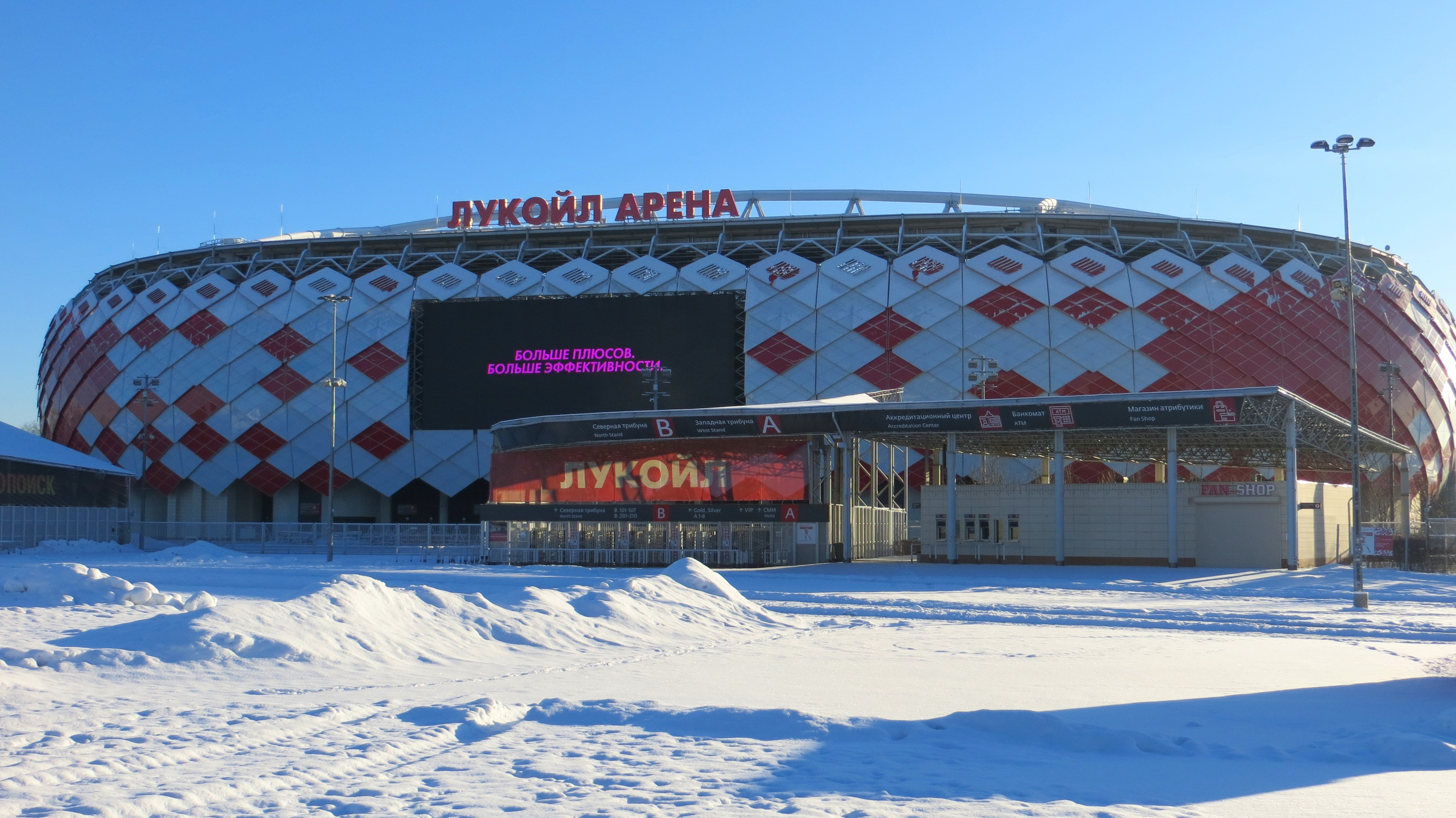
- UEFA
- Interactive map of Lukoil Arena
- Full name: Lukoil Arena
- Location: Volokolamskoye sh. 69, Moscow
- Coordinates: 55°49′4.3″N 37°26′24.9″E
- Owner: Spartak Moscow (Lukoil)
- Capacity: 45,360 (Russian Premier League); 44,190 (2018 FIFA World Cup)
- Surface: Grass
- Field size: 105 × 68 m
- Public transit: Spartak

Construction
- Groundbreaking: October 2010; 16 years ago
- Built: 2010–2014
- Opened: 5 September 2014; 12 years ago
- Cost: 14 billion RUB (200 million Euro)
- Architects: BiznesTehProekt, PozhEvroStroi

Tenants
- Spartak Moscow (2014–present); Russia national football team (selected matches)

Website
- spartak.com/stadium/about

Lukoil Arena (Russian: Лукойл Арена), formerly Otkritie Bank Arena (Russian: Открытие Банк Арена) and Otkritie Arena (Russian: Открытие Банк Арена), also known as Spartak Stadium (Russian: Стадион Спартак) (the stadium's official name during the 2017 FIFA Confederations Cup and 2018 FIFA World Cup), is a multi-purpose stadium north-west of Moscow, Russia. The venue is used mostly for football matches, hosting the home matches of Spartak Moscow.

The stadium is designed with a capacity of 45,360 people. It has been used for select matches of Russian national football team.

== Background ==
Spartak Moscow had not had its own stadium. The team had to play its home matches at the Luzhniki, Lokomotiv, Dynamo, Torpedo and Olympic stadiums.

The first attempt to build a home arena was made in 1994. The Moscow government allocated a plot of land in the area of the Botanical Garden; but, in March 1999, it banned the construction of a stadium on this site due to protests by public organizations and local residents. It was proposed to build a stadium in the same area, but in a different location. The selected area was equidistant from four metro stations at once: "Botanical Garden", "Sviblovo", "Otradnoye" and "Vladykino". 39 hectares were allocated for the construction of a stadium with a capacity of 52 thousand people. The construction of the stadium was scheduled to begin in 2001, but it soon became clear that part of the selected territory belongs to the All-Russian Exhibition Center, which demanded a rent of 30 million US dollars from the club. As a result, the construction was never started.

In September 2001, a plan was developed for the construction of a stadium at the intersection of Michurinsky Prospekt and Lobachevsky Street. It was supposed to build a stadium with a capacity of 10,000 people less than the previous one, but with an amusement park on the territory. However, for a number of reasons, including the lack of funds from the Moscow government and Spartak, the stadium was not built.

== History ==
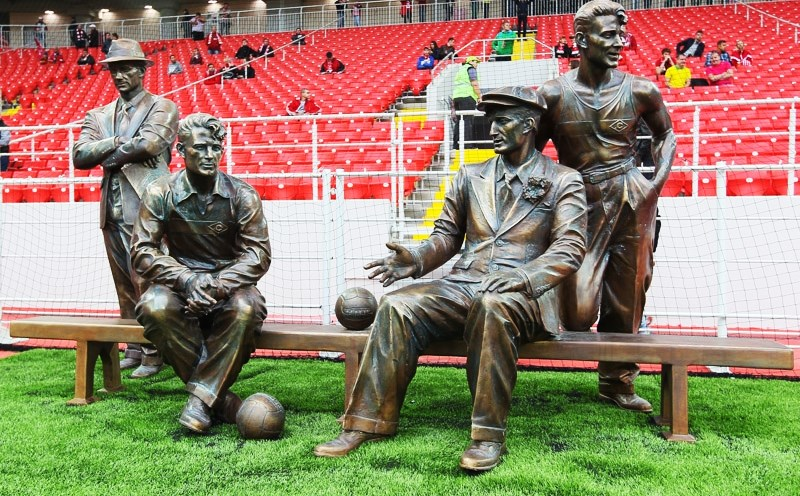
Starostin brothers monument

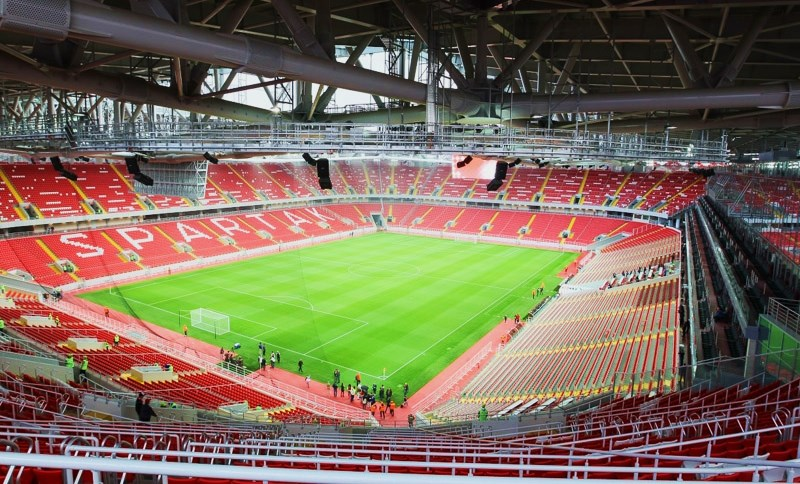
The stadium inside

The groundbreaking ceremony was held on 2 July 2007, but construction was delayed multiple times because of administration delays, location peculiarities and the world financial and economic crisis. Construction was scheduled to be completed between 2009 and 2010 but, as of 2009, the stadium was still in the design stage. In 2010, the stadium project underwent revision because it was rejected by an architectural council that found the project too ordinary. The current design was developed by AECOM, in association with Sport Concepts, and façade designer, Dexter Moren Associates adjacent to a separate indoor arena. The main financing of the construction came from the club's owner Leonid Fedun through affiliated companies LUKoil company and IFD Kapital.

With the construction of the stadium in 2015, the Moscow Metro station Spartak, which had been completed in 1975, opened for passenger traffic. On 19 February 2013 it was announced that the new stadium will be named "Otkrytiye Arena" for six years under the terms of the contract with Otkrytiye Bank. On August 27, 2014, the Spartak Metro Station was opened. On the same day President of Russia Vladimir Putin, Deputy Prime Minister of Russia Vitaly Mutko, Prime Minister of Russia Dmitry Medvedev and Mayor of Moscow Sergey Sobyanin visited the stadium. On 21 August 2014, a monument to the Starostin brothers, the founders of Spartak Moscow, opened near the north stands inside the stadium. A 24.5-meter sculpture of the Roman gladiator Spartacus, for whom the club is named, was unveiled in the square outside the stadium.

The stadium officially opened on 5 September 2014. Spartak played a friendly football match against Red Star Belgrade and drew 1–1, with Dmitri Kombarov scoring the first goal for Spartak at the new stadium after a free-kick. On October 12, 2015, a bronze statue of the Spartak and USSR national team player Fyodor Cherenkov was inaugurated next to the stadium. The stadium was constructed on the site of the Tushino Airport. The new stadium was included in Russia's bid for the 2018 FIFA World Cup, hosting the opening game, with Luzhniki Stadium slated to host the final. The stadium was completed ahead of the VTB Arena, which originally was planned for the World Cup opener. It was also one of four stadiums used for the 2017 FIFA Confederations Cup. Artists such as Incubus, Triggerfinger (Park Live 2015) have all performed at the stadium.

Available at the stadium are navigation assistance from volunteers, storage rooms, registration of children and a lost and found office. Two sectors with 50 seats each are available for people with disabilities. This part of the arena is furnished with ramps and elevators. In 2018 the stadium won the nomination for the best stadium in Russia.

In February 2024, the commission of the Russian Premier League did not allow Spartak to hold RPL matches at the Lukoil Arena due to the stadium's non-compliance with the regulations. Due to record snowfalls and a heating system failure, the newly laid lawn was severely damaged.

== 2017 FIFA Confederations Cup ==
Date	Time	Team No. 1	Result	Team No. 2	Round	Attendance
18 June 2017	21:00	Cameroon	0–2	Chile	Group B	33,492
21 June 2017	18:00	Russia	0–1	Portugal	Group A	42,759
25 June 2017	18:00	Chile	1–1	Australia	Group B	33,639
2 July 2017	15:00	Portugal	2–1 (a.e.t.)	Mexico	Third place match	42,659

== 2018 FIFA World Cup ==
Date	Time	Team No. 1	Result	Team No. 2	Round	Attendance
16 June 2018	16:00	Argentina	1–1	Iceland	Group D	44,190
19 June 2018	18:00	Poland	1–2	Senegal	Group H	44,190
23 June 2018	15:00	Belgium	5–2	Tunisia	Group G	44,190
27 June 2018	21:00	Serbia	0–2	Brazil	Group E	44,190
3 July 2018	21:00	Colombia	1–1 (a.e.t.) (3–4 pen.)	England	Round of 16	44,190

== Concerts ==
- June 19, 2015 - Park Live Festival - Muse, Incubus, Triggerfinger
- June 19, 2016 - Rammstein
- July 9, 2016 - Park Live Festival - Red Hot Chili Peppers, The Kills, Nothing But Thieves
- July 10, 2016 - Park Live Festival - Lana Del Rey, John Newman, Passenger, Two Door Cinema Club
- July 13, 2017 – Leningrad
- July 15, 2017 – Depeche Mode – Global Spirit Tour
- July 13, 2018 – Guns N' Roses – Not in This Lifetime... Tour
- June 29, 2019 – Time Machine
- July 19, 2019 – Ed Sheeran – ÷ Tour

== Security ==
In preparation for the 2018 FIFA World Cup, the stadium was outfitted with video surveillance and fan identification systems and screening equipment. Security measures have been developed by the 2018 World Cup Local Organising Committee, Ministry of Internal Affairs and Federal Security Service in collaboration with the stadium services.
