= Zhulebino (Moscow Metro) =

Moscow Metro station

Zhulebino Жулебино
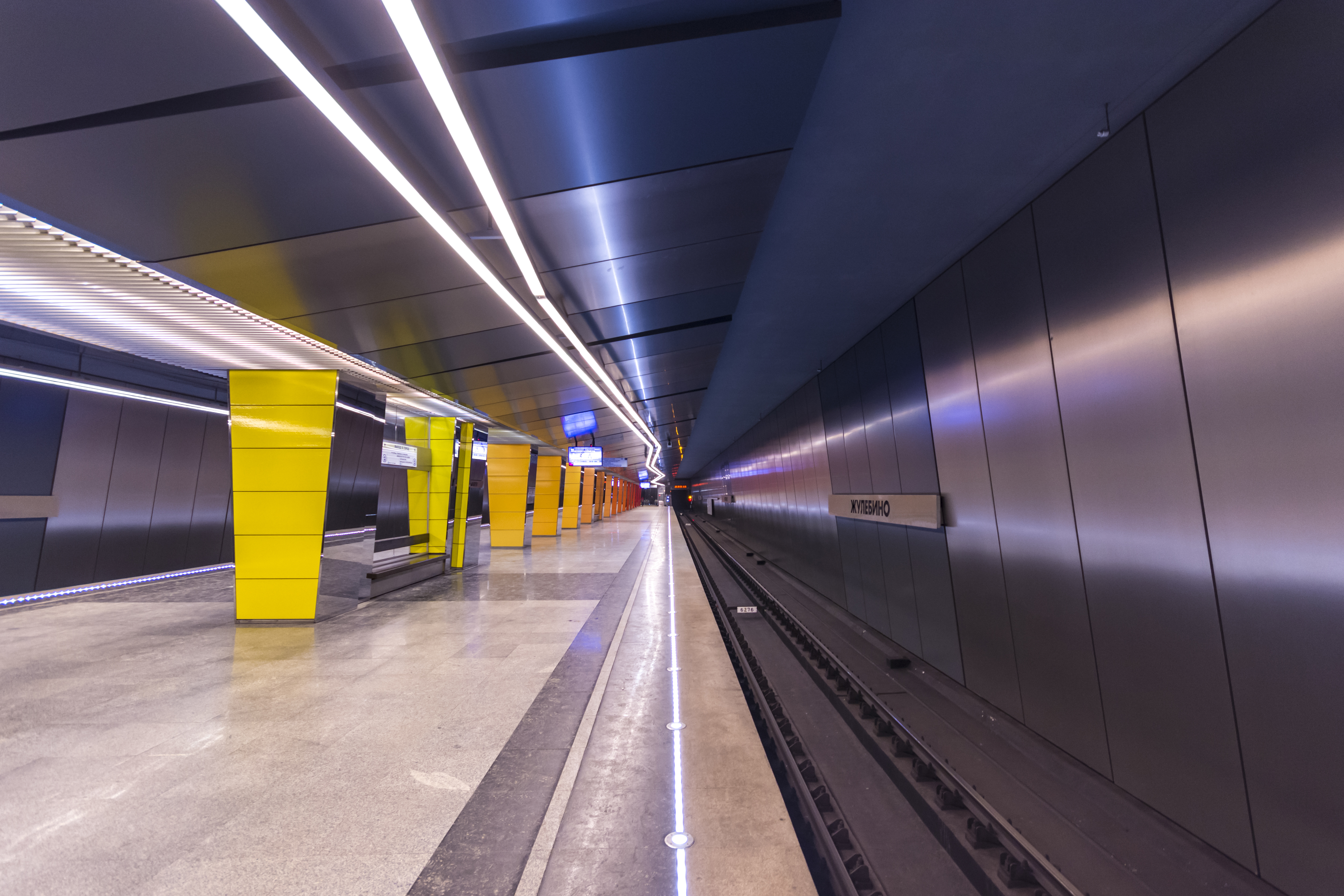
- Station platform in 2016

General information
- Location: Vykhino-Zhulebino District; South-Eastern Administrative Okrug; Moscow; Russia
- Coordinates: 55.6855°N 37.8563°E
- System: Moscow Metro station
- Owner: Moskovsky Metropoliten
- Line: Tagansko-Krasnopresnenskaya line
- Platforms: 1 island platform
- Tracks: 2

Construction
- Structure type: Shallow column two-span
- Depth: 15 metres (49 ft)
- Platform levels: 1
- Parking: No
- Accessible: Yes

History
- Opened: 9 November 2013; 12 years ago

Services
Preceding station	Moscow Metro	Following station
Lermontovsky Prospekt towards Planernaya	Tagansko-Krasnopresnenskaya line	Kotelniki Terminus
Route map
Location
- Location within Moscow Metro

Zhulebino (Russian: Жулебино) is a station on Moscow Metro's Tagansko-Krasnopresnenskaya line. It is named after Zhulebino district and situated at the intersection of General Kuznetsov and Aircraft designer Mil streets. Zhulebino was opened on 9 November 2013. The construction lasted for two years. The station was to be opened on 6 November 2013, however due to a technical failure of a train at neighbouring Lermontovsky Prospekt station it was delayed until the 9th. Its location is outside the Moscow Ring Road beltway.

The station is located underground although the track from Vykhino is at the surface for a part of the path.

The territory at which the station currently located was until 1984 a part of the town of Lyubertsy of Moscow Oblast. In 1984 it was transferred to Moscow, and subsequently rapid urban development started. The whole area, along with Lyubertsy and other areas along the Kazansky and Ryazansky suburban directions of Moscow Railway were strongly dependent on the station of Vykhino, then the terminus of the Tagansko-Krasnopresnenskaya line and a transfer station to both railway directions. In the 2000s, Vykhino was heavily overloaded. Eventually, the decision was taken to extend the Tagansko-Krasnopresnenskaya Line beyond Vykhino. The construction of the first stretch, with the stations of Lermontovsky Prospekt and Zhulebino, started in August 2011. The tunnels were completed by September 2013.

Zhulebino was the terminus until 21 September 2015, when the new terminus at Kotelniki was opened.
