= Tagansko-Krasnopresnenskaya line =

Moscow Metro line

Overview
- Native name: Таганско-Краснопресненская линия
- Locale: Moscow
- Termini: Planernaya (north-west); Kotelniki (south-east)
- Stations: 23

Service
- Type: Rapid transit
- System: Moscow Metro
- Operator: Moskovsky Metropoliten
- Rolling stock: 81-765/766/767
- Daily ridership: 1,370,200

History
- Opened: 31 December 1966; 59 years ago
- Last extension: 21 September 2015; 11 years ago

Technical
- Line length: 42.2 km (26.2 mi)
- Character: Underground with parts at-grade
- Track gauge: 1,520 mm (4 ft 11 27/32 in)
- Electrification: Third rail

The Tagansko-Krasnopresnenskaya line (Russian: Таганско-Краснопресненская линия, IPA: [tɐˈɡanskə krəsnɐˈprʲesʲnʲɪnskəjə ˈlʲinʲɪjə], also ТКЛ) formerly Zhdanovsko-Krasnopresnenskaya (Ждановско-Краснопресненская) (Line 7; Purple Line) is the busiest line of the Moscow Metro system in Moscow, Russia. Built in 1966–1975 and extended in 2013–15, it cuts Moscow on a northwest-southeast axis and contains 23 stations.

== History ==
The Tagansko-Krasnopresnenskaya line is a classic example of Soviet urban planning, sometimes referred to as the seventh stage of the Moscow Metro. Construction began in the early 1960s, and in 1966 the first complete segment was opened. In the practice of Moscow radial line openings, it began at the ring and left through to the new housing massifs on the southeast of Moscow, originally called the Zhdanovskaya line (Ждановская линия). The construction of the new radius was designed to maximize the efficiency of it with the land-based transportation. All the stations were built on major transport links and the stations Tekstilshchiki and Vykhino were integrated into a single transport complex with the railroad stations.

The first segment of the line, originally constructed in 1966, begins at the Taganka Square and follows Volgogradsky avenue through the neighbourhoods of Pechatniki, Kuzminki and Tekstilshchiki. On its final stretch, the line deviates from the Volgogradsky prospect and stretches northeast onto the Ryazansky avenue, terminating at a combined cross-platform transfer to Vykhino (then Zhdanovskaya) railway station. The newly opened radial line was named Zhdanovskaya by the name of its southeastern terminus.

As the line passed through areas with highly complex soil geology, the builders had to use cut-and-cover method for tunnel construction (building the tunnels of large concrete boxes) to cut down the costs. In some cases, specifically on the segment between Volgogradsky prospekt and Tekstilshchiki stations and on the approach to Vykhnino station, the track was brought up to the surface in lieu of constructing underground tunnels in the unstable soil.

In a similar logic that was used when building the Kaluzhsko-Rizhskaya line, it was decided to postpone the construction of central section in favour of building the new radial line. However after the opening of the new Zhdanovskaya line in late 1966, the increasing passenger traffic between it and the former Kaluzhskaya line put too much pressure the capacity of the stretch of Koltsevaya line between Oktyabrskaya and Taganskaya that connected the two radii. It was decided to extend both lines northwards and have them meet close to the Kremlin, which was realized in 1970 when Kitay-Gorod (then Ploshchad Nogina), the first cross-platform station in Moscow metro, was constructed.

The construction of the northwestern Krasnopresnensky radius was undertaken under exceptionally challenging conditions. Designed to provide access to the new residential areas of northwestern Moscow, the construction of the northwestern radius faced numerous obstacles, including dense urban regions, underground fortifications, and communication lines. Starting at the intersection with Koltsevaya line at Krasnopresnenskaya, where the only deep-level station was located, the route was to follow Krasnaya Presnya Street before turning north along 1905 Goda Street, diving under the railway to continue along Khoroshevskoye shosse and crossing another railway to terminate in Shchukino district.

However, right from the beginning, the progress in the construction was hindered by the need to dig a tunnel beneath the sorting yard of the Belorussky Rail Terminal, which consisted of 27 individual railway tracks. The boring of the final section between Polezhayevskaya and Oktyabrskoye Pole also presented additional challenges, as the soil had a heavy concentration loose sand typically used to elevate railways. These peroblems made conventional boring methods impossible. Instead, builders had to first stabilize the soil using chemical adhesives to prevent collapse when drained. To ensure safety, a horizontal platform had to be installed above the tunnel shield, which operated at maximum pressure without temporary reinforcements in the sand. In the end, after its opening in 1972, the Krasnopresnensky radius helped to relive major transport arteries and traffic congestion and provided a crucial link to a railway platform via Begovaya station just like its southern counterpart.

As four of the five stations were sub-surface, an attempt was made to modernise the existing centipede design. The volume of the station space was increased, and to support the larger roof, the size of the pillars was raised, but so was their spacing, from 4 to 6.5 metres (13 ft 1 in to 21 ft 4 in). In the end, the number of columns per row was reduced from 40 to 26 to streamline the design. The new design became very widespread in the rest of the system. The architecture also made a comeback with new stations. For the first time in nearly 20 years, marble was used to decorate the station walls.

Shortly after the Krasnopresnensky radius was commenced in 1972, the construction of the line's two final segments began – the crucial central link and the northern extension to Tushino. The former was built with two deep level column stations (Pushkinskaya and Kuznetsky most), where one of the centrepieces was the increased diameter of the central vault of 9.5 metres (31 ft 2 in). After opening in 1975, these stations later became crucial transfer hubs, linking the Zhdanovsko-Krasnopresnenskaya line to Gorkovsko-Zamoskvoretskaya, Serpukhovsko-Timiryazevskaya and Kirovsko-Frunzenskaya lines.

The latter section, which was set to run further west through the Shchukino district and then turn north towards the end Severnoye Tushino, encountered a significant difficulty when building under the Moscow Canal. To avoid flooding, boring had to be done in the winter, and a three-metre thick plane of ice had to be placed on the canal bed. Opened in 1975, the line stretched into the northern districts of Shchukino and Tushino, including another transfer to a railway station at Tushinskaya. The station Skhodnenskaya was another pioneering design, as it was built using the single-vault technology initially developed for the Kharkiv Metro; this technology, with some modifications, was later widely implemented for other construction projects both in Moscow metro and elsewhere in Soviet Union. One station on this stretch was left unfinished because of the lack of need for it and remained derelict for several decades. The unfinished ghost station was finally completed and inaugurated forty years later, in August 2014 under the name Spartak.

Because the line is the busiest on the system, there are significant problems that overstretch its capabilities. In particular is the station Vykhino, which was built with too small a capacity to handle the congestion, making it the busiest on the system. In 2004 a severe reconstruction increased the area of the platforms and gave the station a desirable facelift. Nonetheless, that was insufficient to solve the problem, and in 2013 the line was extended to the south-eastern districts of Moscow outside the Ring Road with the opening of Zhulebino and Lermontovsky Prospekt stations. By September 2015, the line had reached a neighboring city of Kotelniki with the opening of an eponymous metro station and the line's new southeastern terminus there on 21 September.

=== Timeline ===
Segment	Date opened	Length
Taganskaya–Vykhino	31 December 1966	12.9 km
Taganskaya–Kitay-gorod	30 December 1970	2.1 km
Barrikadnaya–Oktyabrskoye Pole	30 December 1972	7.2 km
Kitay-gorod–Barrikadnaya	17 December 1975	4.1 km
Oktyabrskoye Pole–Planernaya	30 December 1975	9.6 km
Vykhino–Zhulebino	9 November 2013	4.6 km
Spartak	27 August 2014	—
Kotelniki	21 September 2015	1.3 km
Total		41.8 km

=== Name changes ===
Station	Previous name(s)	Years
Vykhino	Zhdanovskaya	1966–1989
Kitay-gorod	Ploschad Nogina	1971–1990

== Stations ==
Station Name		Transfers
English	Russian	Transfers
Planernaya	Планерная	
Skhodnenskaya	Сходненская	
Tushinskaya	Тушинская	Tushinskaya
Spartak	Спартак	
Shchukinskaya	Щукинская	Shchukinskaya
Oktyabrskoye Pole	Октябрьское Поле	Panfilovskaya
Polezhayevskaya	Полежаевская	Khoroshyovskaya; Khoroshyovo
Begovaya	Беговая	Begovaya
Ulitsa 1905 Goda	Улица 1905 года	
Barrikadnaya	Баррикадная	Krasnopresnenskaya
Pushkinskaya	Пушкинская	Tverskaya; Chekhovskaya
Kuznetsky Most	Кузнецкий Мост	Lubyanka
Kitay-gorod	Китай-город	Kitay-gorod
Taganskaya	Таганская	Taganskaya; Marksistskaya
Proletarskaya	Пролетарская	Krestyanskaya Zastava
Volgogradsky Prospekt	Волгоградский проспект	
Tekstilshchiki	Текстильщики	Tekstilshchiki; Tekstilshchiki
Kuzminki	Кузьминки	
Ryazansky Prospekt	Рязанский проспект	Veshnyaki
Vykhino	Выхино	Vykhino
Lermontovsky Prospekt	Лермонтовский проспект	Kosino; Kosino
Zhulebino	Жулебино	
Kotelniki	Котельники	
Putilkovo	Путилково	
Kurkino	Куркино	

== Rolling stock ==
The line is served by two depots, Planernoe (No. 6) and Vykhino (No. 11). Respectively 36 and 34 eight carriage trains are assigned to them. Most of the trains are Ezh3 and Em-508T models which were received new from 1974, currently all of the trains were modernized between 2003 and 2011 extending the service life by another 15 years. From 2012 to 2017, the line was also served by 10 81-717/714 trains, which were transferred here from other lines. As of 2019 the line is only served by Ezh and 81-765/766/767 trains.

Mocsow department of transportation entrusted TMH to build different rolling stocks for Moscow metro. THM factory in Mytishchi commenced production of the 81-765, 81-766, and 81-767 cars. In April 2017, they were introduced on Line 7.THM is also contracted to the maintenance of cars for 30 years.

Subway car types used on the line over the years:

Type	Dates
Series E	1966–1974
Series Ezh/Em-508/Em-509	1971–1980
Series Ezh3	1974–2020
Series 81-717	2012–2017
Series 81-760/761	2015–2018
Series 81-765/766/767	2017–present

== Recent developments and future plans ==
=== Southern radius ===
After the opening of the Kotelniki station, there are no further development plans extending beyond 2020 horizon.

=== Northern radius ===
Extension of Arbatsko-Pokrovskaya line (Line 3) allowed easier access to the Metro system to the passengers from Strogino and Mitino districts, diverting them from the northern stretch of the Tagansko-Krasnopresnenskaya line. However, this relief was not very significant, mostly due to Arbatsko-Pokrovskaya line being relatively slow. It takes 30 minutes to reach the Koltsevaya line from Mitino station, while the older Tushinskaya-Barrikadnaya route takes 20. In addition, it does not offer convenient transfers to Kaluzhsko-Rizhskaya line and Kalininskaya line, as the old route does. Another source of congestion to the northern terminus station, Planernaya, is the newly developed Kurkino district, which lies nearby just beyond the Moscow Ring Road. Additionally, passengers from Khimki diverted to this station due to redevelopment of the Rechnoy Vokzal area that caused changes in the bus routes. An extension is proposed from the Planernaya to the Kurkino district.
