= Kuzminki (Moscow Metro) =

Moscow Metro station

Kuzminki Кузьминки
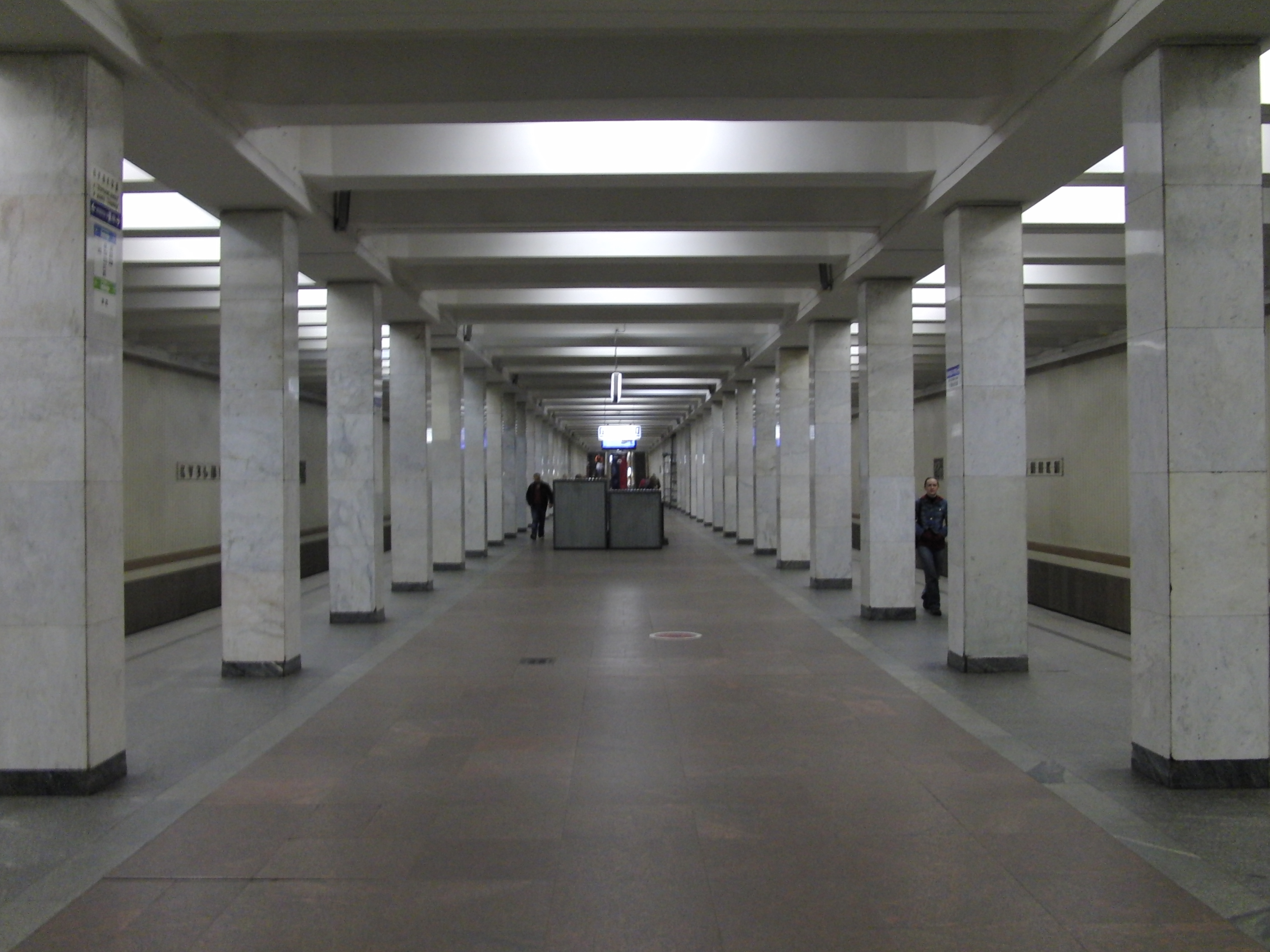

General information
- Location: Kuzminki District; South-Eastern Administrative Okrug; Moscow; Russia
- Coordinates: 55.7056°N 37.7656°E
- System: Moscow Metro station
- Owner: Moskovsky Metropoliten
- Line: Tagansko-Krasnopresnenskaya line
- Platforms: 1 island platform
- Tracks: 2
- Connections: Bus: Вк, Вч, 89, 99, 143, 159, 169, 169к, 655, 658, 955; Trolleybus: 74,75

Construction
- Platform levels: 1
- Parking: No

Other information
- Station code: 112

History
- Opened: 31 December 1966; 59 years ago

Services
Preceding station	Moscow Metro	Following station
Tekstilshchiki towards Planernaya	Tagansko-Krasnopresnenskaya line	Ryazansky Prospekt towards Kotelniki
Route map
Location
- Location within Moscow Metro

Kuzminki (Russian: Кузьминки) is a station on Moscow Metro's Tagansko-Krasnopresnenskaya Line. The station was opened on 31 December 1966 as part of the Zhdanovsky radius.

== Name ==
It is named after the Kuzminki District in southeastern Moscow where it is situated.

== Overview ==
The station has two underground vestibules interlinked with subways under the Volgogradskiy avenue with access to Zelenodolskaya, Marshala Chuikova and Zhigulevskaya streets with light glazed pavilions on the surface. Up to Kuzminki, the Line follows Volgogradsky Avenue to the southeast. However, afterwards the line turns perpendicular and adjoins the parallel Ryazanskiy Avenue and then follows it. As a result, the station has high passenger traffic due to public transport arriving from the southeastern suburban towns which in March 2002 totalled 116,100 passengers daily.

== Design ==
The station is a typical pillar-trispan design of the 1960s with a modest theme (architects L.A. Shagurina and M.N.Korneeva) of white marbled pillars and creme and red coloured ceramic tiles on the walls, which are also decorated with cast bas reliefs that contain images of forest animals (artist G.G. Derviz). The floor is covered with grey and red granite.

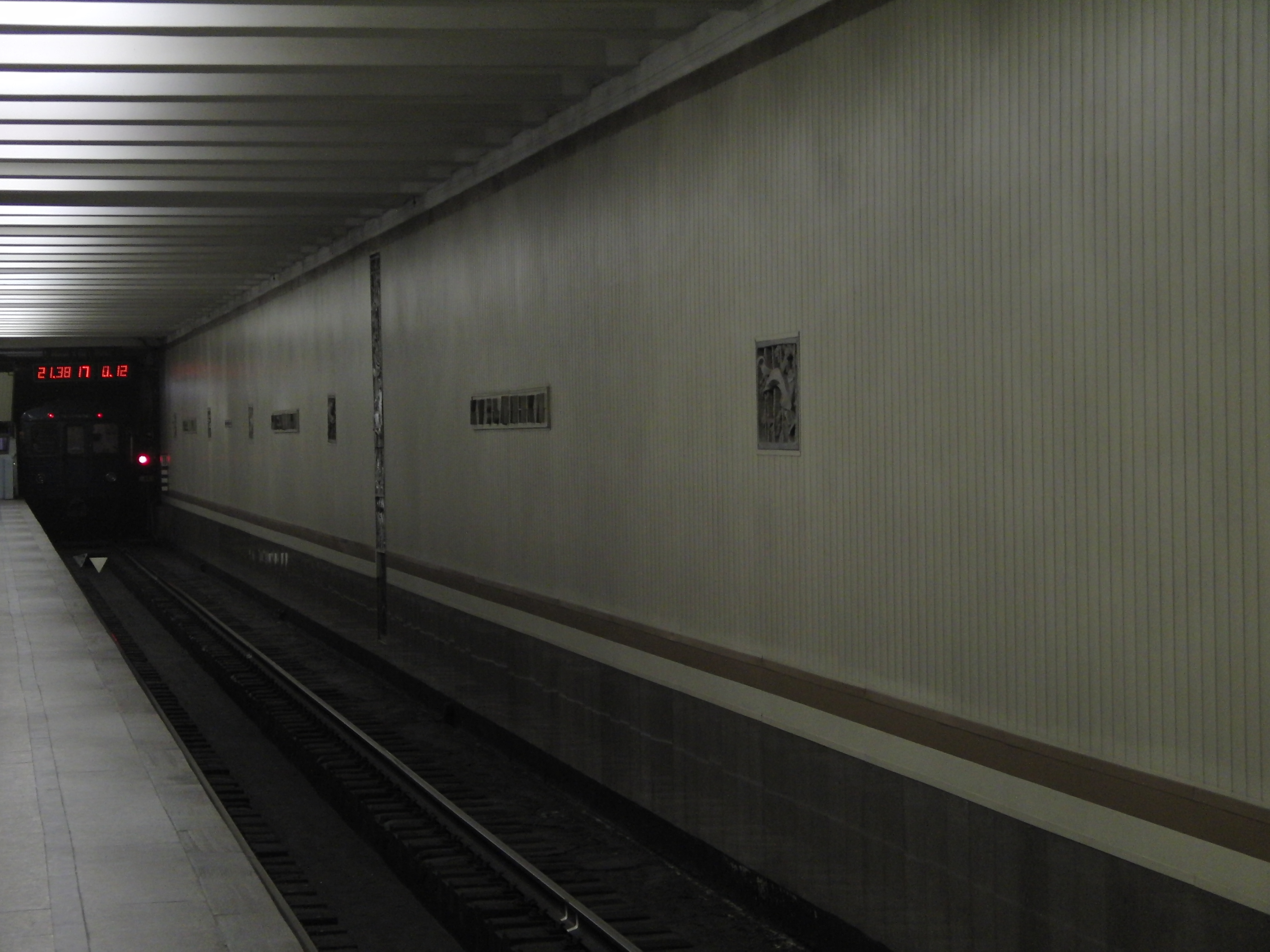
Platform view
