= Shchukinskaya railway station =

Railway station in Moscow, Russia

Shchukinskaya Щукинская
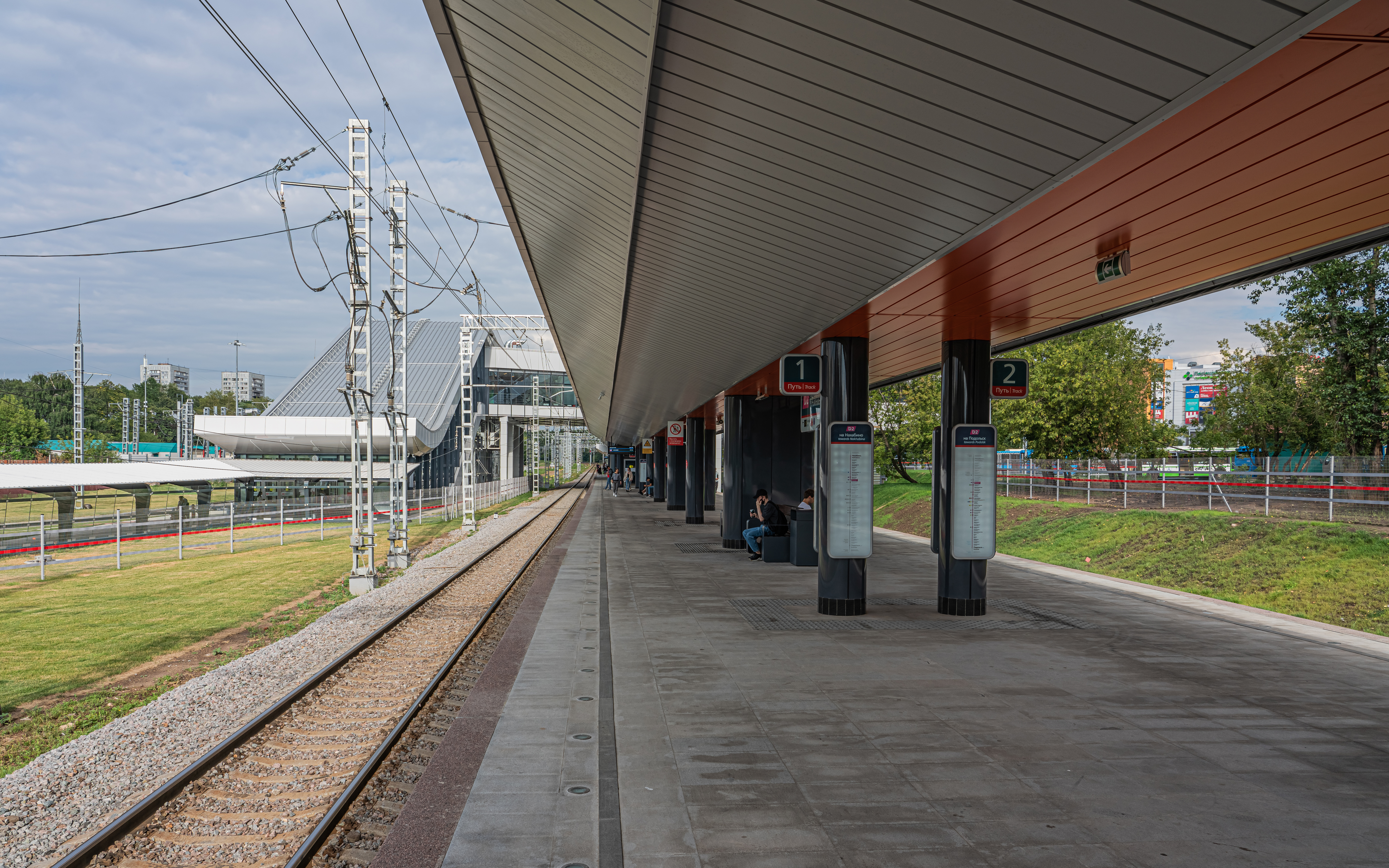

General information
- Location: Moscow; Russia
- System: Moscow Railway platform
- Owner: Russian Railways
- Operator: Moscow Railway

History
- Opened: 25 June 2021; 5 years ago

Services
Preceding station	Moscow Central Diameters	Following station
Tushinskaya towards Nakhabino	Line D2	Streshnevo towards Podolsk
Route map
Location

Shchukinskaya is a railway station of Line D2 of the Moscow Central Diameters in Moscow. It was opened on 25 June 2021. It took the transport functions of Pokrovskoye-Streshnevo railway station, which was simultaneously closed.

== Gallery ==
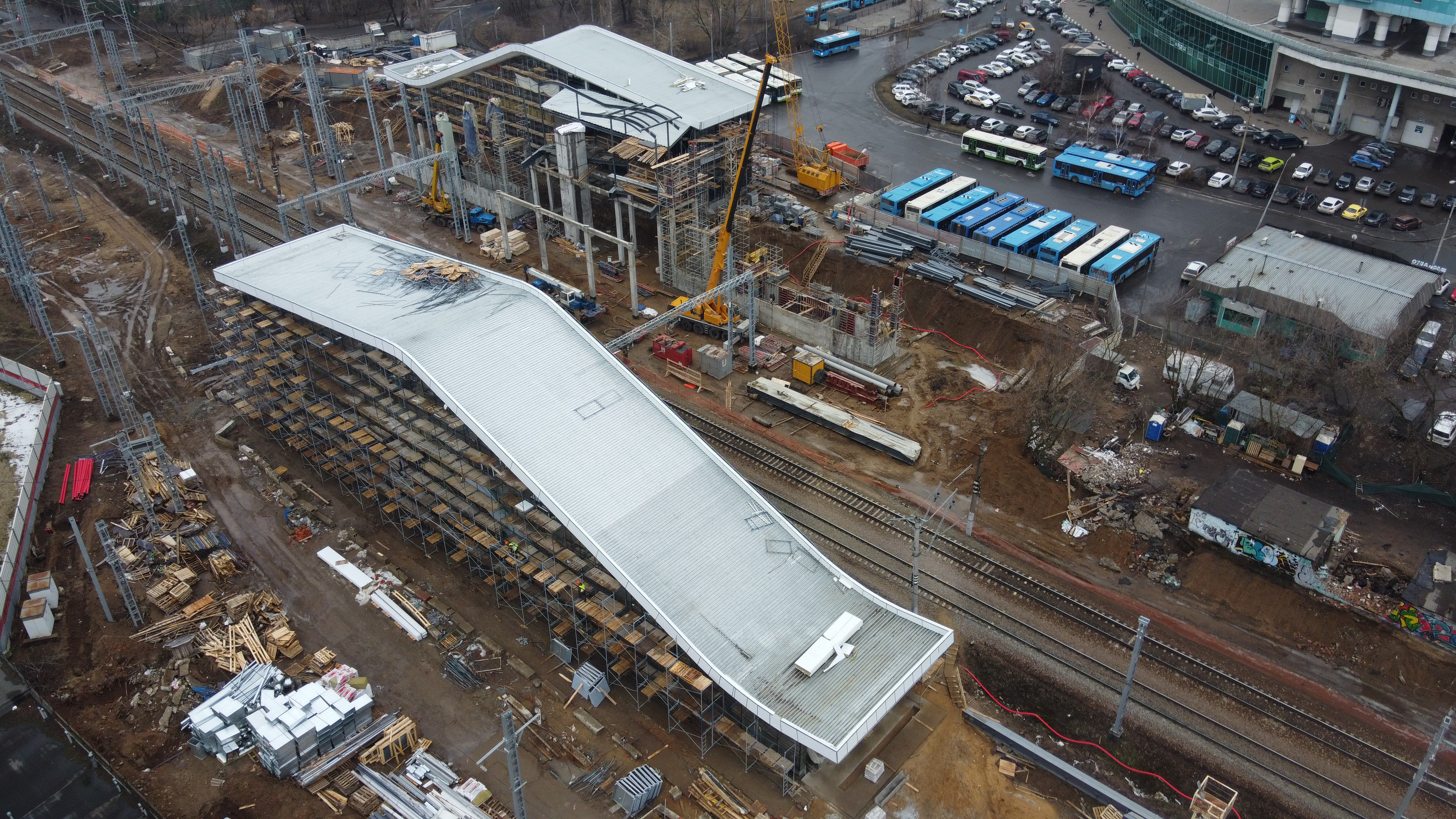
Construction progress as of March 2020

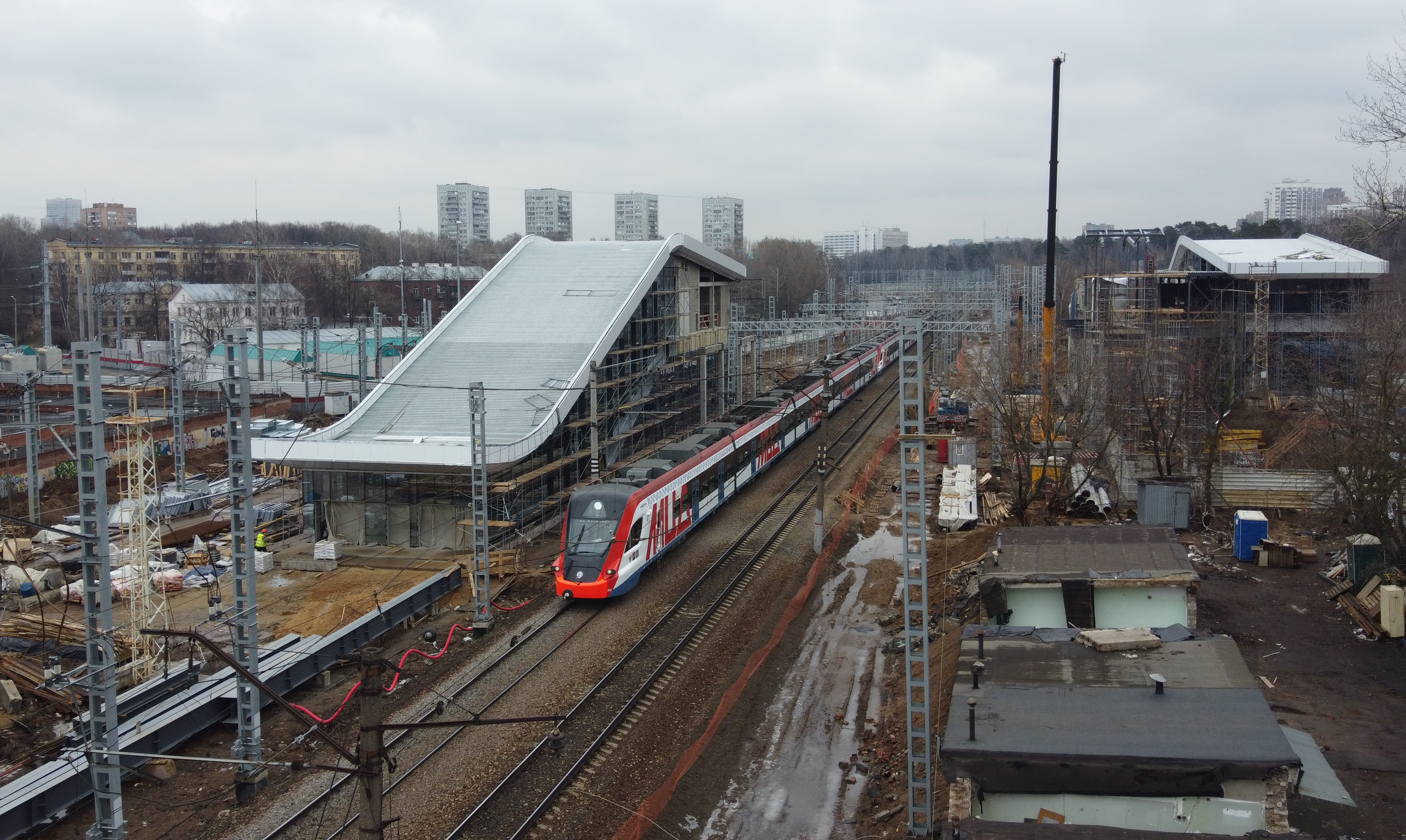
Construction progress as of March 2020
