= Planernaya (Moscow Metro) =

Moscow Metro station

Planernaya Планeрная
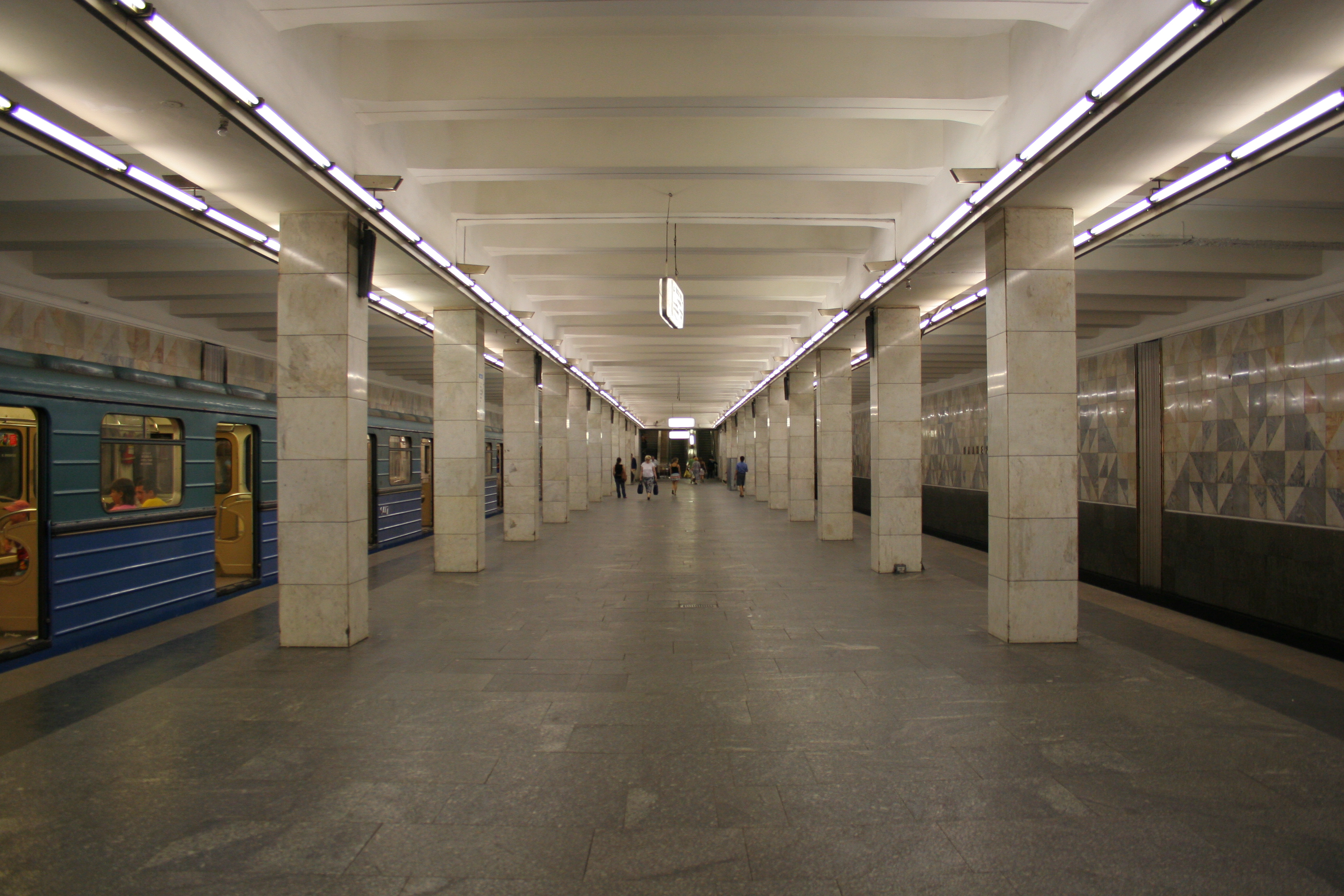

General information
- Location: Severnoye Tushino District; North-Western Administrative Okrug; Moscow; Russia
- Coordinates: 55.8607°N 37.4364°E
- System: Moscow Metro station
- Owner: Moskovsky Metropoliten
- Line: Tagansko-Krasnopresnenskaya line
- Platforms: 1 island platform
- Tracks: 2
- Connections: Bus: Т, 43, 88, 96, 102, 173, 267, 268, 383, 434, 469, 472, 678, 782, 817, 905; Trolleybus: 202, 203

Construction
- Depth: 6 metres (20 ft)
- Platform levels: 1
- Parking: No

Other information
- Station code: 128

History
- Opened: 30 December 1975; 50 years ago

Services
Preceding station	Moscow Metro	Following station
Terminus	Tagansko-Krasnopresnenskaya line	Skhodnenskaya towards Kotelniki
Route map
Location
- Location within Moscow Metro

Planernaya (Russian: Пла́нерная) is a Moscow Metro station. It opened on December 30, 1975 as the final section of the northern extension of the Krasnopresnensky radius.

It is not to be confused with Planernaya Railway Platform on the Moscow-St Petersburg Railway 7 kilometres (4.3 mi) to the North and on the other side of Khimki.

== Location ==
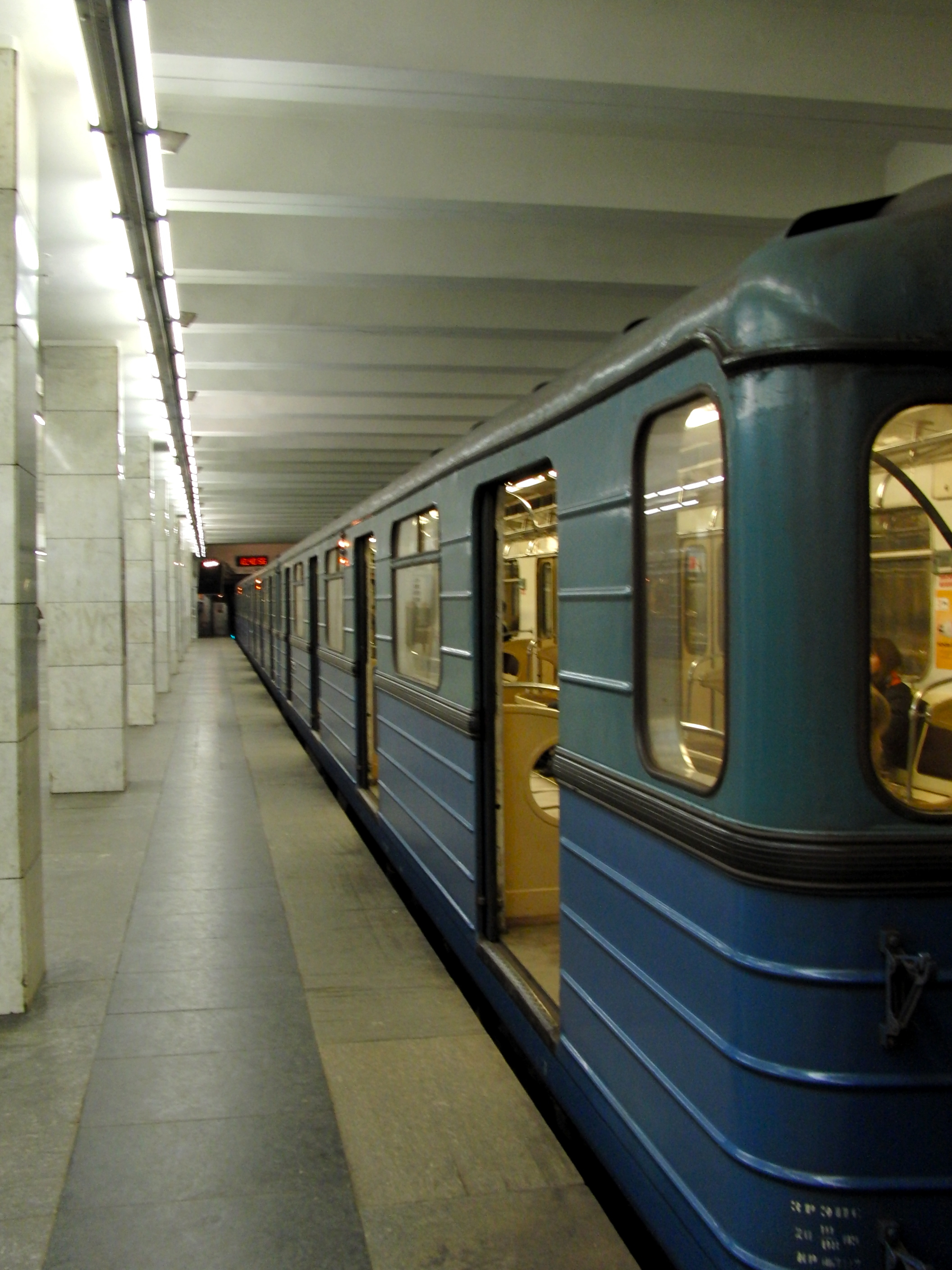
Station platform with departing train

Planernaya metro station is located at Planernaya Street in Moscow's Severnoye Tushino District. It is the northwestern terminus of the Tagansko-Krasnopresnenskaya Line. The station was the northernmost in the Metro system until the opening of Medvedkovo in 1978. To the north of the station is the Planernoye depot, which opened with the extension (and hence relieved Krasnaya Presnya).

== Building ==
The architect Trenin faced the pillars with white marble and the floor with black granite. The station walls are decorated with geometric patterns formed from white, blue-grey, and yellow shades. This gives the station a very bright appearance.

=== Entrances / exits ===
The station has two surface vestibules which lead to Fomicheva and Planernaya streets.
