= Kotelniki (Moscow Metro) =

Moscow Metro station

Kotelniki Котельники
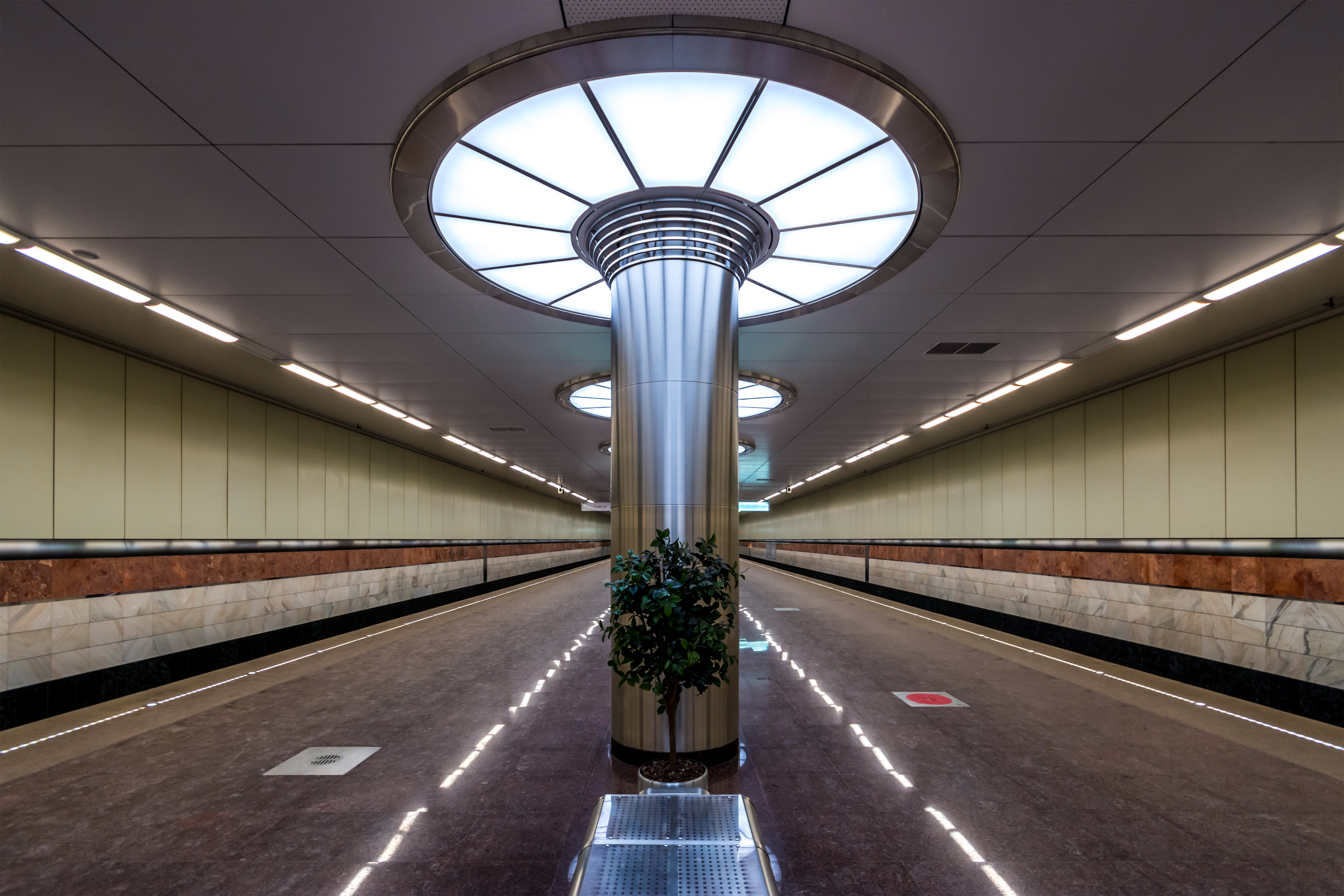

General information
- Coordinates: 55.6743°N 37.8582°E
- System: Moscow Metro station
- Owner: Moskovsky Metropoliten
- Line: Tagansko-Krasnopresnenskaya line
- Platforms: 1 island platform
- Tracks: 2

Construction
- Structure type: Shallow column two-span
- Platform levels: 1
- Parking: No
- Accessible: Yes

History
- Opened: 21 September 2015; 10 years ago

Services
Preceding station	Moscow Metro	Following station
Zhulebino towards Planernaya	Tagansko-Krasnopresnenskaya line	Terminus
Route map
Location
- Location within Moscow Metro

Kotelniki (Russian: Котельники) is a station on the Moscow Metro's Tagansko-Krasnopresnenskaya line. The eastern terminus of the line, east of the station of Zhulebino, was opened on 21 September 2015. The station is located in the town of Kotelniki of Moscow Oblast. It is the second station of Moscow Metro in Moscow Oblast after Myakinino. In 1984, after the western part of the town of Lyubertsy was transferred to Moscow, rapid urban development started. The whole area, along with Lyubertsy and other areas along the Kazansky and Ryazansky suburban directions of Moscow Railway were strongly dependent on the station of Vykhino, then the terminus of the Tagansko-Krasnopresnenskaya line and a transfer station to both railway directions. In the 2000s, Vykhino was heavily overloaded. Eventually, the decision was taken to extend the Tagansko-Krasnopresnenskaya line beyond Vykhino. The construction of the first stretch, with the stations of Lermontovsky Prospekt and Zhulebino, was completed on 9 November 2013. The second stretch connected Zhulebino and Kotelniki.

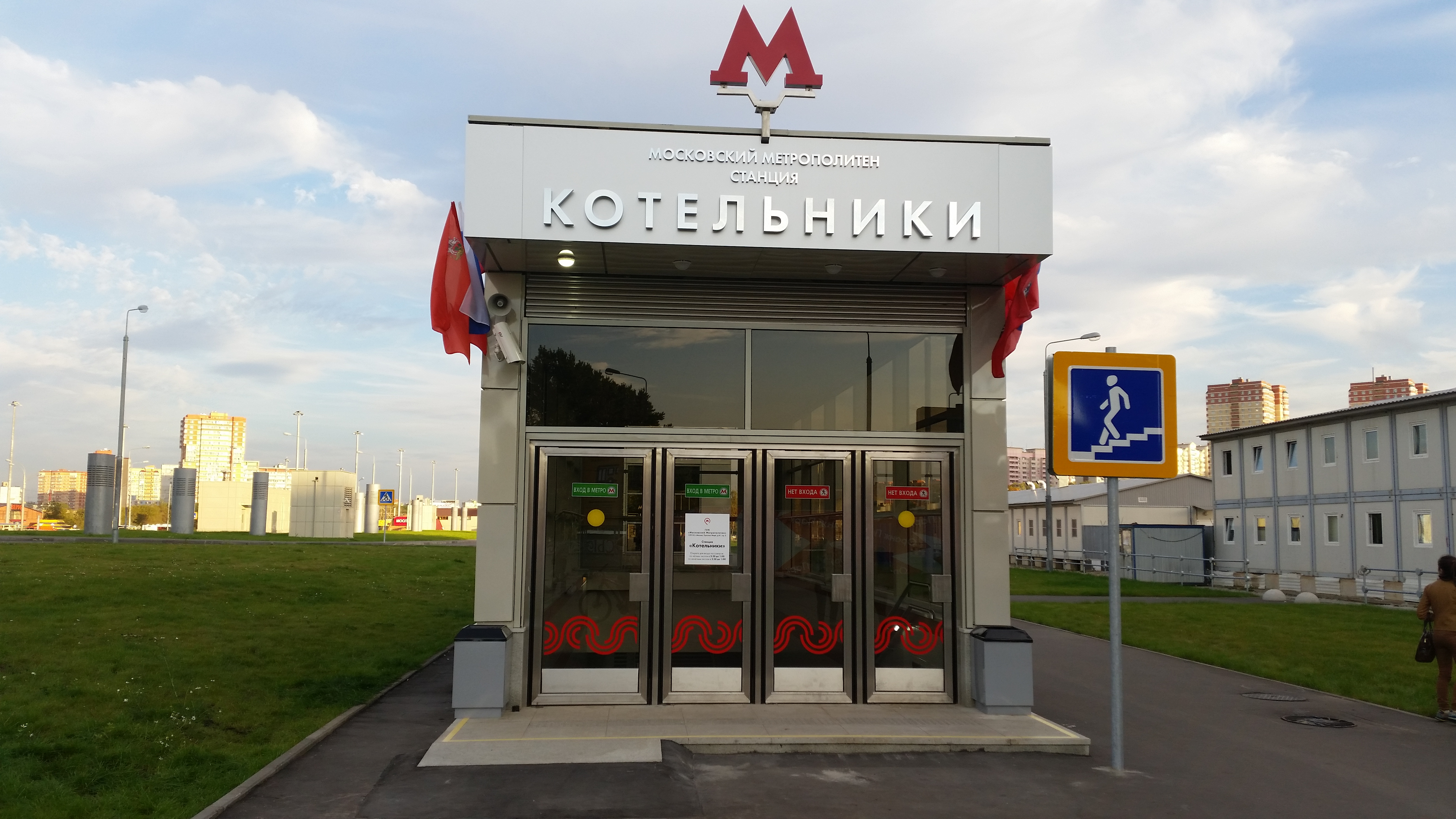
One of the exits located in Kotelniki (Moscow Oblast)

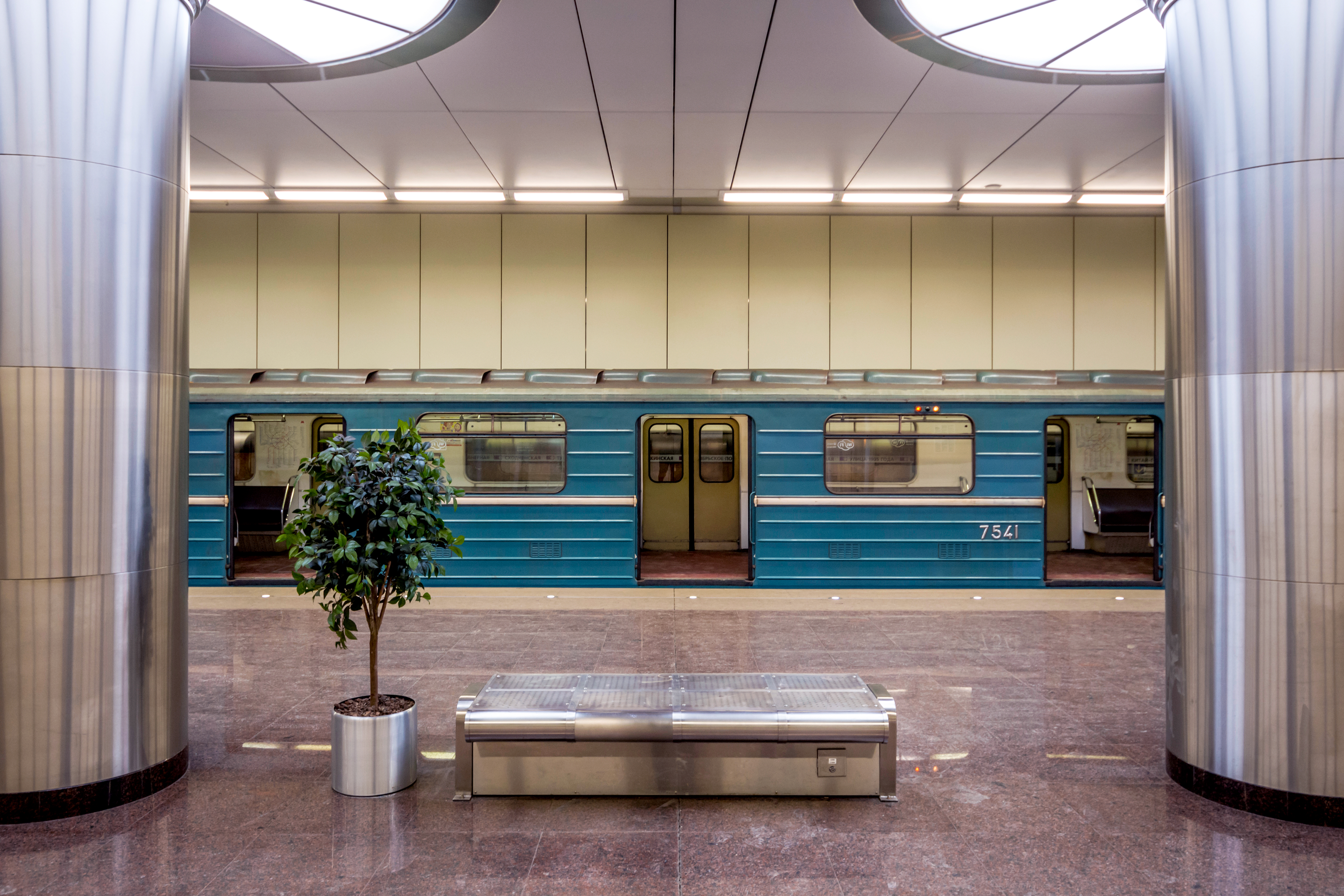
Train at track 1

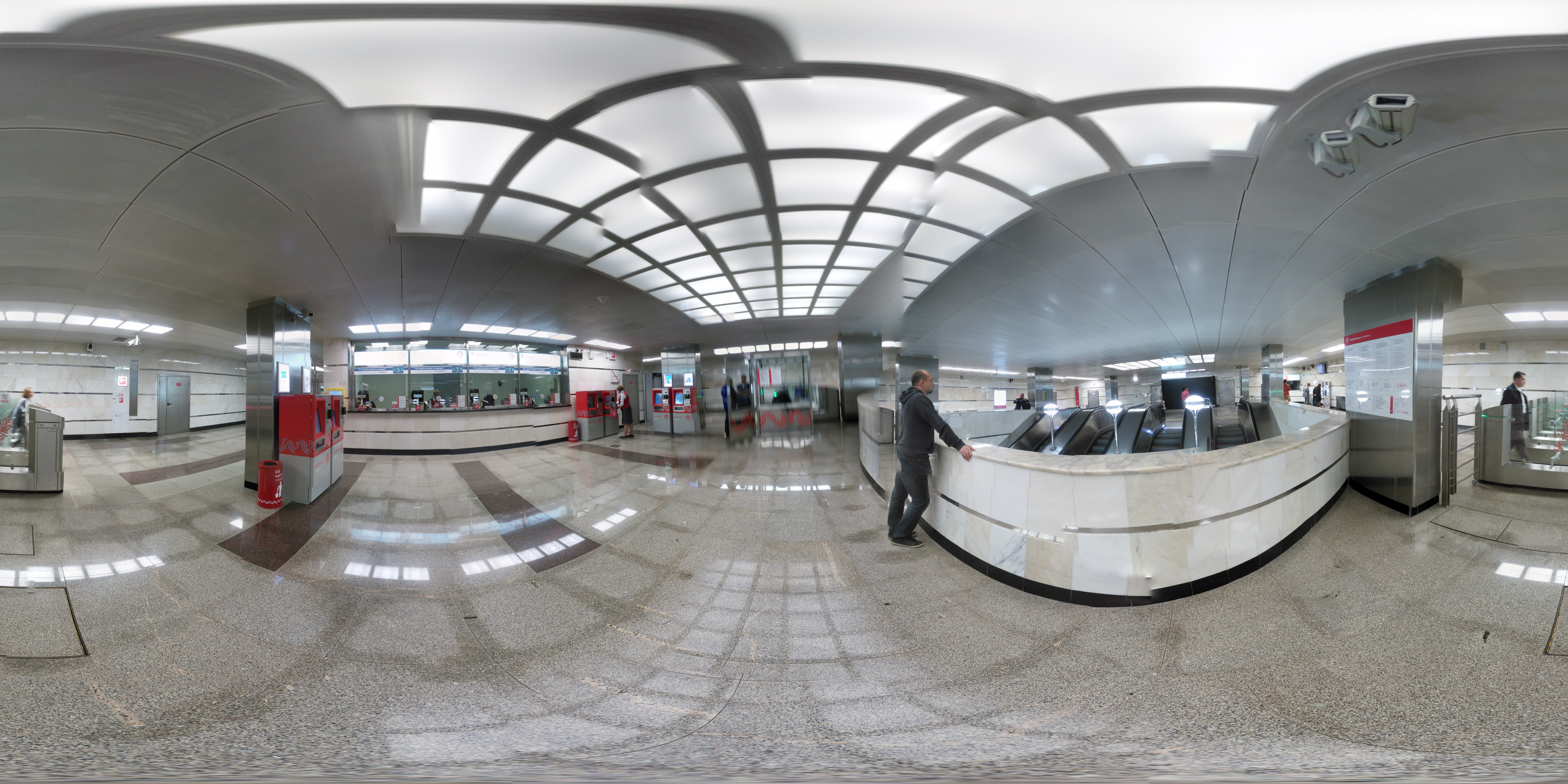
Underground ticket hall 1

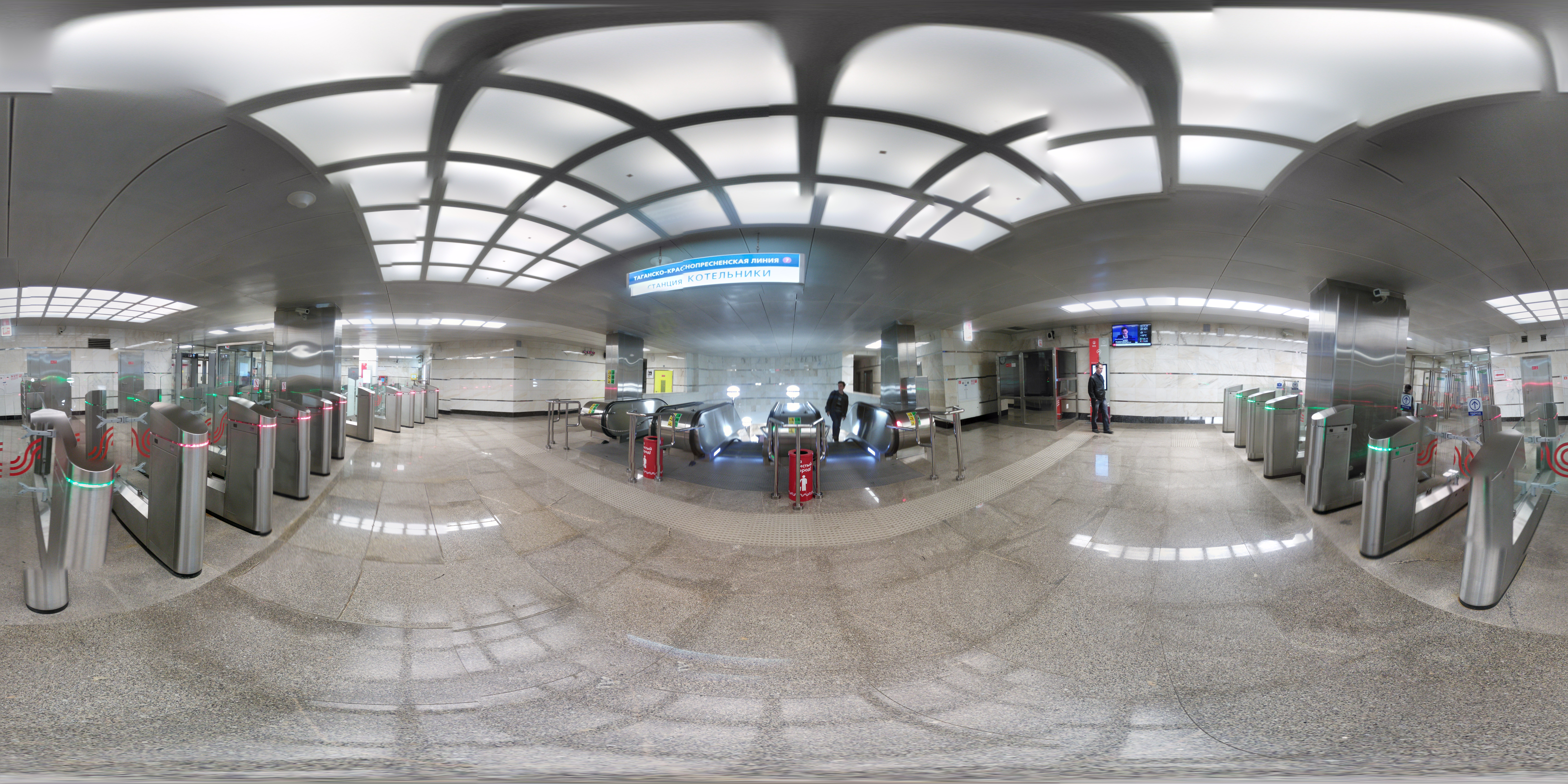
Underground ticket hall 2

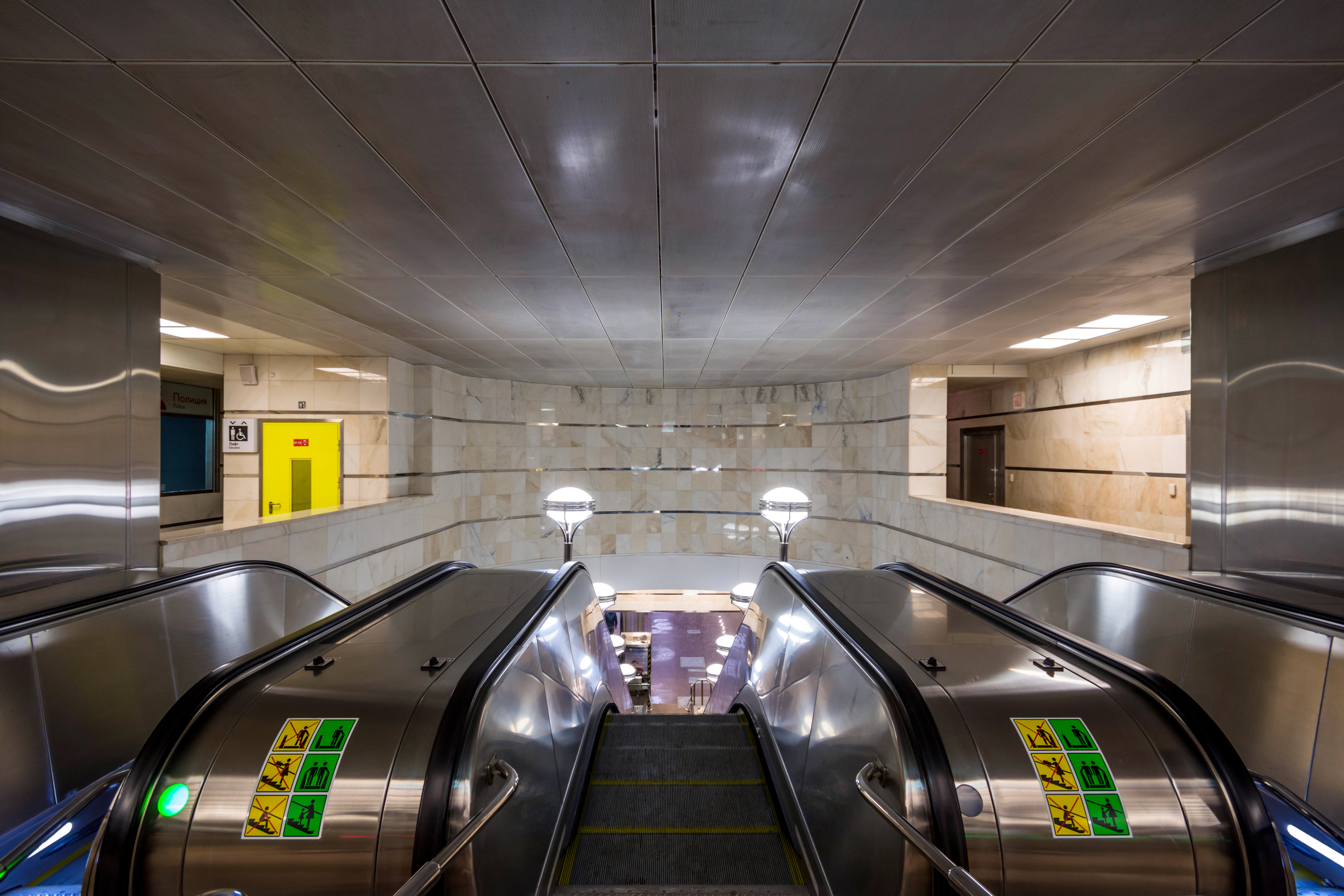
Escalators
