= Ryazansky suburban railway line =

Railway line in Russia, Moscow - Ryazan

Ryazan suburban railway line

Overview
- Native name: Рязанское направление
- Termini: Moskva Kazanskaya; Ryazan-1

Service
- Operator(s): Moscow railway
- Depot(s): Ramenskoe, Rybnoe

History
- Opened: 1862-06-20
- Last extension: 1864
- Completed: 1864

Technical
- Line length: 198 km (123 mi)
- Number of tracks: 2,4
- Track gauge: 1,520 mm (4 ft 11 27/32 in) Russian gauge
- Electrification: 3,000 V DC, overhead lines

The Ryazansky suburban railway line (Russian: Рязанское направление Московской железной дороги) is one of eleven railway lines used for suburban railway connections between Moscow, Russia, and surrounding areas, mostly in Moscow Oblast. The Ryazansky suburban railway line connects Moscow with the stations in the south-east, in particular, with the towns of Lyubertsy, Kurovskoye, and Shatura. The stations the line serves are located in Moscow, in Lyubertsy, Ramenskoye, Voskresensk, Kolomna, and Lukhovitsy in Moscow Oblast, as well as Rybnovsky and Ryazansky Districts and the city of Ryazan in Ryazan Oblast. The suburban trains have their northwestern terminus at Moscow Kazansky railway station in Moscow. In the southeastern direction, the suburban trains terminate at Ippodrom, Faustovo, Vinogradovo, 88km, Shifernaya, Golutvin, Ryazan I, and Ryazan II. The line is operated by Moscow Railway. The tracks between Moscow Kazansky railway station and Lyubertsy I are also used by Kazansky suburban railway line.

The suburban railway line follows the railway which connects Moscow with Ryazan and continues further to Samara and Saratov. It is electrified and has at least two tracks everywhere between Moscow and Ryazan. The distance between Kazansky railway station and Ryazan I is 197 kilometres (122 mi).

== History ==
The railway between Moscow and Kolomna was constructed between 1860 and 1862 and was officially open for passenger and cargo traffic on July 20, 1862; 163 years ago.

The section between Moscow and Lyubertsy has been electrified in 1933. In 1934, the electrification was extended to Bykovo, and in 1935 to Ramenskoye. It was extended to Ryazan in 1958.

Commuter service D3 Zelenograd - Ippodrom opened by Ryazansky suburban line at August 17, 2023; 2 years ago, it increased count of local trains on this line.

== Stations ==
Following the standard notations in Russia, a railway stop below is called a station if it is a terminus or if it has a cargo terminal, and it is called a platform otherwise.

1. Moscow Kazansky railway station (station), transfer to Kurskaya metro station of Sokolnicheskaya line and Komsomolskaya metro station of Koltsevaya line;
2. Elektrozavodskaya (platform), transfer to Elektrozavodskaya metro station of Arbatsko-Pokrovskaya line and Elektrozavodskaya metro station of Bolshaya Koltsevaya line;
3. Sortirovochnaya (platform);
4. Aviamotornaya (platform), transfer to Aviamotornaya metro station of Kalininsko-Solntsevskaya line and Aviamotornaya metro station of Bolshaya Koltsevaya line;
5. Andronovka (platform), transfer to Andronovka Moscow Central Circle station;
6. Perovo (station);
7. Plyushchevo (platform);
8. Veshnyaki (platform);
9. Vykhino (platform), transfer to Vykhino metro station;
10. Kosino (platform), transfer to Lermontovsky Prospekt and Kosino metro stations;
11. Ukhtomskaya (platform);
12. Lyubertsy I (station), the last station jointly used with Kazansky suburban railway line;
13. Panki (platform);
14. Tomilino (platform);
15. Kraskovo (platform);
16. Malakhovka (platform);
17. Udelnaya (platform);
18. Bykovo (station);
19. Ilyinskaya (platform);
20. Otdykh (platform);
21. Kratovo (platform);
22. Yeseninskaya (platform);
23. Fabrichnaya (platform);
24. Ramenskoye (station);
25. Ippodrom (platform);
26. Sovkhoz (platform);
27. Zagornovo (platform);
28. Bronnitsy (station);
29. Raduga (platform);
30. 63 km (platform);
31. Beloozyorsky (platform);
32. Faustovo (station);
33. Zolotovo (platform);
34. Vinogradovo (station);
35. Konobeyevo (platform);
36. Trofimovo (platform);
37. 88 km (platform);
38. Voskresensk (station), transfer to Greater Ring of the Moscow Railway;
39. Shifernaya (station);
40. Moskvoretskaya (platform);
41. Tsemgigant (platform);
42. Peski (station);
43. Konev Bor (platform);
44. Khoroshyovo (platform);
45. 113 km (platform);
46. Kolomna (platform);
47. Golutvin (station), connection to Ozyory;
48. Shchurovo (station);
49. Chyornaya (platform);
50. Lukhovitsy (station);
51. 142 km (platform);
52. Podlipki (station);
53. Fruktovaya (station);
54. Alpatyevo (station);
55. Slyomy (platform);
56. Divovo (station);
57. Rybnoye (station), connection to Uzunovo;
58. Ryazan-Sortirovochnaya (platform);
59. 187 km (platform);
60. 189 km (platform);
61. Nedostoyevo (platform);
62. Dyagilevo (station);
63. Lagerny (platform), the last station before branching to Ryazan I and Ryazan II;
64. Ryazan I (station), connection to Kustaryovka;
65. Ryazan II (station), connection to Ryazhsk I.

== Branch lines ==
Panki — Malchiki — Yanichkino — Dzerzhinsky

Electrified for cargo trains to Yanichkino, where diverts industrial tracks to local factories. Passenger service Panki — Dzerzinsky closed in 1996.

Perovo — Staroproletarskaya

Long freight line in Moscow industrial suburbs operated by RZD. Farest section Boynya — Simonovo abandoned in the 1990s, section Staroproletarskaya — Boynya not operated since the 2020s,

Malchiki — Lytkarino

Long industrial track, operated by private company with own diesel shunters.

Bykovo — Oktyabrsky and Zhukovsky

Long industrial track, operated by private company with own diesel shunters TGM6 class. Own depot located in Zhukovsky.

Golutvin — Ozyory

Passenger service with RA3 class DMU. At fist kilometer the Kolomna Diesel Locomotive Research Institute located, it uses the Golutvin — Ozyory line for test rides. The line was opened in 1893; 133 years ago.

Lukhovitsy — Zaraysk

RZD-operated freight diesel line. The line was opened in 1870; 156 years ago. Passenger service closed in the 1969; 57 years ago.
