= Aviamotornaya =

Aviamotornaya may refer to:

- Aviamotornaya (Kalininsko-Solntsevskaya line)
- Aviamotornaya (Bolshaya Koltsevaya line)
