= Alexey Vygovsky =

Russian serial killer (born 1986)

- Born: Alexey Olegovich Vygovsky; 6 June 1986 (age 40); Vladivostok, Primorsky Krai, RSFSR
- Other name: "The Station Poisoner"
- Convictions: Murder x37 Attempted murder x37 Theft x3
- Penalty: 22 years, 3 months imprisonment

Details
- Victims: 37
- Span of crimes: 2006–2009
- Country: Russia
- State: Moscow
- Date apprehended: 2 March 2009

Alexey Olegovich Vygovsky (Russian: Алексей Олегович Выговский; born 6 June 1986), known as The Station Poisoner (Russian: Отравитель в электричках), is a Russian serial killer and thief who, together with two accomplices, poisoned 37 people from 2006 to 2009 in the Moscow metro stations in order to rob them, resulting in 37 fatalities. For his crimes, he would later be convicted and sentenced to 22 years and 3 months imprisonment.

== Early life ==
Alexey Vygovsky was born in Vladivostok in 1986 to a family of a police investigator and her husband. Beginning at the age of 7, Vygovsky periodically ran away from his home and had to be brought back home after being found living in abandoned houses, landfills and back streets. In addition, he was withdrawn and refused to make friends with classmates at school, preferring to befriend strangers. A habitual thief, he would frequently steal money from his parents, for which he would always be grounded or punished. In 2000, aged 14, he fled to Moscow, claiming to his parents that he worked as a pie salesman. While living there, he was joined by a gang of pickpockets but was arrested and sentenced to a year of imprisonment for theft.

After finishing his sentence, Vygovsky's father picked him up from the capital and returned him to Vladivostok. At his parents' behest, he entered the Far Eastern State University of Communication, but in the spring of 2004, he again ran away to Moscow, where he resided for the entire summer. Upon returning to Vladivostok in September 2005, he dropped out of college and applied for a job as a sales assistant at a sports equipment store, but barely a week later, he was convicted of theft and was sent to a corrective labour colony in Ryazan Oblast. Upon his release, he again moved to Moscow, where he soon met a woman named Anastasia, with whom he began a relationship.

== Murders ==
While he presented himself as a mobile phone salesman to his wife, Vygovsky wanted to continue with his thefts but this time he would have to incapacitate his victims to prevent them from retaliating. Using a flask containing a mixture of cognac and the sleeping medicine Azaleptin, Vygovsky would approach and befriend inebriated strangers on Moscow's subway lines, offering them a drink from his concoction and robbing them after they were successfully poisoned, leaving the crime scene without checking if they had died or not.

His first recorded victim was a man he met on the Kazansky suburban railway line on 14 January 2006. The victim, who was returning home from work, was offered a sip by Vygovsky, and after drinking it, he succumbed to its effects and died at the Kosino railway station. After his death, Vygovsky stole his money, bank card, gold chain, wrist watch and mobile phone, all of which he later sold. Despite the man's death being deemed suspicious, and the fact that his supposed robber was filmed on video withdrawing money from his bank account, police negligence resulted in the case being deemed an accident and the cause of death as heart failure. While he evaded arrest for this crime, Vygovsky would later be arrested in May for theft and served time until 2007.

After his release, Vygovsky realized that he could acquire large amounts of wealth if he continued his scheme. He rented an apartment in Drezna and convinced two of his neighbours, 37-year-old Uzbekistani national Shukhrat Dzhuraev and 23-year-old Ilya Trubanov, both of whom were also ex-convicts, to join him. The pair agreed, acting as lookouts, getaway drivers or sometimes participating in the poisonings themselves. The gang, under Vygovsky's leadership, continued with the poisonings, predominantly taking place along the Kursky railway station and Kazansky railway line. Once a victim had been incapacitated and their belongings stolen, Vygovsky would either keep it all for himself or share with his partners, with his cut usually being sold at a pawn shop. As this usually brought the gang tens of thousands of rubles a day, Vygovsky began buying luxury gifts for his girlfriend and a Toyota 4Runner for himself. In total, 32 people are known to have been poisoned by Vygovsky and his accomplices: 17 fatally, and 15 non-fatally, with the latter suffering from neurological damage after the event. Among the gang's murder victims was 30-year-old athlete Maxim Pakhomushkin, who died in the summer of 2008.

== Arrest, trial and imprisonment ==
Using testimony provided by one of the surviving victims, Muscovite investigators combed through CCTV footage provided by the built-in cameras on ATMs, through which they successfully identified Vygovsky. He was detained at the Kursky railway station on 2 March 2009, and upon inspecting his pockets, officers found a tranquillizer filled with a strange substance, later determined to be Azaleptin tablets dissolved in alcohol. Vygovsky was brought into the police station for interrogation, where he denied intentionally killing his victims, only admitting to the robberies. He even claimed that he drank the poisonous mixture himself, as a cure to his insomnia, but this was dismissed by the investigators.

After his accomplices were arrested, the trio were held in detention until the investigation concluded gathering evidence. During this time, Trubanov, who suffered from a drug addiction, died from heart failure in the pre-trial detention centre. The investigators questioned more than 500 witnesses and examined thousands of hours of video footage, with the legal case amounting to hundreds of volumes. In the end, Vygovsky and Dzhuraev were brought to trial, on 17 counts of negligent homicide and 32 charges of robbery. At the proceedings, Vygovsky expressed no remorse for his crimes, claiming that he only felt bad for being caught. Both men were convicted of their respective crimes, with Vygovsky receiving a sentence of 22 years and 3 months imprisonment, while Dzhuraev - 15 years, which they would serve in separate maximum security penal colonies.

== See also ==
- List of Russian serial killers
