= Shosse Entuziastov =

The Entuziastov Highway (Russian: Шоссе Энтузиастов, romanized: Shosse Enthuziastov) is a major arterial road in Moscow, Russia. It may also refer to:

- Shosse Entuziastov (Kalininsko-Solntsevskaya Line), a Moscow Metro station
- Shosse Entuziastov (Moscow Central Circle), a Moscow Central Circle station
