= Kazansky suburban railway line =

Railway line in Russia

Logo

The Kazansky suburban railway line (Russian: Казанское направление Московской железной дороги) is one of eleven railway lines used for suburban railway connections between Moscow, Russia, and surrounding areas, mostly in Moscow Oblast. The Kazansky suburban railway line connects Moscow with the stations in the east, in particular, with the towns of Lyubertsy, Kurovskoye, and Shatura. The stations the line serves are located in Moscow, as well as in Lyubertsy, Ramenskoye, Orekhovo-Zuyevo, and Shatura in Moscow Oblast. The suburban trains have their western terminus at Moscow Kazansky railway station in Moscow. In the eastern direction, the suburban trains terminate at Kurovskaya, Shatura, and Cherusti. There are also direct suburban trains to Yegoryevsk which from Kurovskaya follow Greater Ring of the Moscow Railway. The line is operated by Moscow Railway. The tracks between Moscow Kazansky railway station and Lyubertsy I are also used by Ryazansky suburban railway line.

The suburban railway line follows the railway which connects Moscow with Arzamas and Kazan. It is electrified and has two tracks everywhere between Moscow and Kazan, though in Vekovka the electric power changes. The distance between Moscow Kazansky railway station and Cherusti is 156 kilometres (97 mi).

== History ==
The railway between Moscow and Kolomna, which includes the section between Moscow and Lyubertsy, was constructed between 1860 and 1862 and was officially open for passenger and cargo traffic on 20 July 1862. The line connecting Lyubertsy and Murom was opened in 1911. The section between Moscow and Lyubertsy was electrified in 1933. The electrification was extended to Cherusti in 1960.

== Stations ==
Following the standard notations in Russia, a railway stop below is called a station if it is a terminus or if it has a cargo terminal, and it is called a platform otherwise.

1. Moscow Kazansky railway station (station), transfer to Kurskaya metro station of Sokolnicheskaya line and Komsomolskaya metro station of Koltsevaya line;
2. Elektrozavodskaya (platform), transfer to Elektrozavodskaya metro station;
3. Sortirovochnaya (platform);
4. Aviamotornaya (platform), transfer to Aviamotornaya metro station of Kalininsko–Solntsevskaya and Aviamotornaya metro station of Bolshaya Koltsevaya line;
5. Andronovka (platform), transfer to Andronovka Moscow Central Circle station;
6. Perovo (platform);
7. Chukhlinka (platform);
8. Veshnyaki (platform);
9. Vykhino (platform), transfer to Vykhino metro station;
10. Kosino (platform), transfer to Lermontovsky Prospekt and Kosino metro stations;
11. Ukhtomskaya (platform);
12. Lyubertsy I (station), the last station jointly used with Ryazansky suburban railway line;
13. Lyubertsy II (station);
14. Korenyovo (platform);
15. Ovrazhki (station);
16. Rodniki (platform);
17. Vyalki (platform);
18. Khripan (platform);
19. 41 km (platform);
20. Donino (platform);
21. 49 km (platform);
22. 52 km (platform);
23. Grigorovo (platform);
24. 55 km (platform);
25. Gzhel (station);
26. Ignatyevo (platform);
27. Kuzyayevo (platform);
28. Shevlyagino (platform);
29. 73 km (platform);
30. Antsiferovo (platform);
31. Podosinki (platform);
32. Kurovskaya (station), transfer to Greater Ring of the Moscow Railway;
33. 90 km (platform);
34. 95 km (platform);
35. Avsyunino (station);
36. Zapolitsy (platform);
37. Zaputnaya (station);
38. Shaturtorf (station);
39. Shatura (station);
40. Botino (platform);
41. Krivandino (station), connection to Ryazanovka;
42. Tugolesye (platform);
43. Voymezhny (platform);
44. Cherusti (station), connections to Vekovka.

== Branch lines ==
=== Krivandino — Ryazanovka ===
Southbound line built in 1944 for firewood transport. In the Soviet era it was used for peat transport to Shatura power plant. Owned by RZD. Passenger service with RA1 class DMU, 5 trains per day.

=== Cherysti - Urshelsky ===
Private railway line of a glass factory. Passenger service closed in the 2010s.

=== Cherysti - Roshal ===
Private railway line of Roshal chemical factory. Passenger service until 1990s, when an asphalt road for buses was built.

== Former connecting lines ==
=== Shatura narrow gauge railway ===
750 mm (2 ft 5 1/2 in) gauge. Extensive railway network for peat transport to Shatura power plant, northbound and southbound from Shatura narrow gauge station. Passenger service until 1994. The last section closed in the 2010s, when power station switched all boilers to natural gas.

=== Krivandino - Misheronsky ===
Long private railway line of a glass factory.
