= Moscow Kazansky railway station =

Railway station in Moscow, Russia

Moscow–Kazansky Москва–Казанская
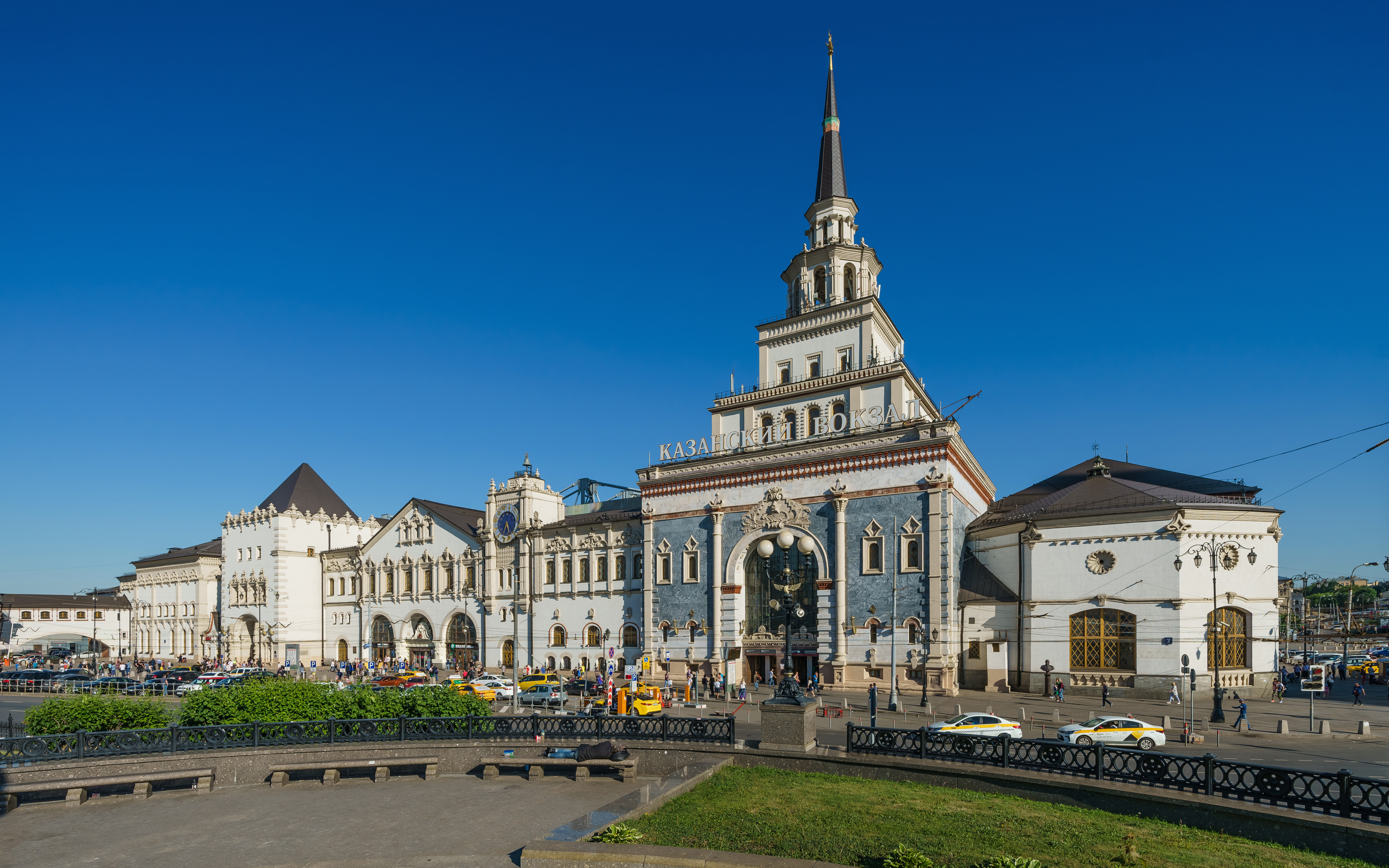
- Exterior view of the station

General information
- Location: 2 Komsomolskaya Square; Krasnoselsky District Central Administrative Okrug Moscow; Russia
- Coordinates: 55.773333°N 37.656389°E
- System: Moscow Railway terminal
- Platforms: 9
- Tracks: 17
- Connections: Moscow Metro stations; Komsomolskaya; Komsomolskaya; Tram: 7, 13, 37, 50; Bus: 40, 122, А, T88, T14; Trolleybus: 22, 41

Other information
- Station code: 194013
- Fare zone: 0

History
- Opened: 1864
- Rebuilt: 1913, 1950, 1987
- Electrified: 1933
- Former names: Ryazansky

Services
Preceding station	Russian Railways	Following station
Terminus	Kazansky Suburban	Elektrozavodskaya towards Krivandino
Terminus	Ryazansky Suburban	Elektrozavodskaya towards Ryazan 1
Route map
Location
- Location within Moscow Ring Road

Kazansky railway terminal (Russian: Каза́нский вокза́л, Kazansky vokzal, pronounced [kɐˈzanskʲɪj vɐɡˈzaɫ]) also known as Moscow Kazansky railway station (Russian: Москва́–Каза́нская, Moskva–Kazanskaya) is one of nine railway terminals in Moscow, situated on the Komsomolskaya Square, across the square from the Leningradsky and Yaroslavsky stations. It was ranked nr. 9 in a list of Europe's best train stations by the Consumer Choice Centre in 2020.

Kazansky station primarily serves two major railway lines radiating from Moscow: the eastbound one, to Kazan, Yekaterinburg, and points beyond (one of the routes of the Trans-Siberian Railway), and the south-east-bound one, to Ryazan. After Ryazan, the south-eastern line branches a number of times, so that trains originating from Kazansky station serve most of south-eastern Russia, Kazakhstan, and the post-Soviet Central Asian states (mostly via the Trans-Aral line). Commuter trains serving these two directions use Kazansky station as well.

Occasionally, long-distance trains serving the eastbound Moscow-Nizhny Novgorod line use Kazansky station as well. However, the commuter trains of that line never do so, as they always arrive to Moscow's Kursky Rail Terminal.

The forerunner of today's Kazan railway station was built in 1862 with the opening of the railway line from Moscow to Ryazan. Construction of the modern building according to the design by architect Alexey Shchusev started in 1913 and ended in 1940. The building resembles the Söyembikä Tower in Kazan.

== Trains and destinations ==
=== Long distance ===
Train number	Train name	Destination	Operated by
001/002	Premium (ex. Tatarstan) (rus, tat: Премиум (Татарстан))	(Russia) Kazan	(Russia) Russian Railways
003/004	Kavkaz (rus: Кавказ)	(Russia) Kislovodsk	(Russia) Russian Railways
005/006	Uzbekistan (uzb: Oʻzbekiston)	(Uzbekistan) Tashkent	(Uzbekistan) Oʻzbekiston temir yoʻllari
009/010	Zhiguli (rus: Жигули)	(Russia) Samara	(Russia) Russian Railways
011/012	Sochi (rus: Сочи)	(Russia) Adler	(Russia) Russian Railways
013/014	Yuzhny Ural (rus: Южный Урал)	(Russia) Chelyabinsk (coach: (Russia) Magnitogorsk)	(Russia) Russian Railways
015/016	Premium (ex. Ural) (rus: Премиум (Урал))	(Russia) Yekaterinburg	(Russia) Russian Railways
017/018	Kyrgyzstan (kyr, rus: Кыргызстан)	(Kyrgyzstan) Bishkek	(Kyrgyzstan) Kyrgyz Railway
019/020	Premium (ex. Tikhy Don) (rus: Премиум (Тихий Дон))	(Russia) Rostov-on-Don	(Russia) Russian Railways
021/022	Ulyanovsk (rus: Ульяновск)	(Russia) Ulyanovsk	(Russia) Russian Railways
023/024	Premium (ex. Yarmarka) (rus: Премиум (Ярмарка))	(Russia) Nizhny Novgorod (Moskovsky)	(Russia) Russian Railways
025/026	Italmas (rus, udm: Италмас))	(Russia) (Udmurtia) Izhevsk	(Russia) Russian Railways
029/030	Premium (ex. Kuban) (rus: Премиум (Кубань))	(Russia) Novorossiysk	(Russia) Russian Railways
031/032	Orenburzhye (rus: Оренбуржье)	(Russia) Orenburg	(Russia) Russian Railways
033/034	North Ossetia-Alania (os: Ирыстон, rus: Оcетия)	(Russia) (North Ossetia–Alania) Vladikavkaz	(Russia) Russian Railways
039/040	Bashkortostan (bash: Башҡортостан, rus: Башкортостан)	(Russia) (Bashkortostan) Ufa	(Russia) Russian Railways
041/042	Mordovia (erz, mok, rus: Мордовия)	(Russia) (Mordovia) Saransk	(Russia) Russian Railways
049/050	Double-deck coach (rus: Двухэтажный состав)	(Russia) Samara	(Russia) Russian Railways
051/052	Sura (rus: Сура)	(Russia) Penza	(Russia) Russian Railways
053/054	Chuvashia (chv: Чӑваш Ен, rus: Чувашия)	(Russia) (Chuvashia) Cheboksary	(Russia) Russian Railways
057/058	Mariy El (mar, rus: Марий Эл)	(Russia) (Mari El) Yoshkar-Ola	(Russia) Russian Railways
059/060	Tyumen (rus: Тюмень)	(Russia) Nizhnevartovsk	(Russia) Russian Railways
065/066	Zhiguli sea (rus: Жигулевское море)	(Russia) Tolyatti	(Russia) Russian Railways
089/090	Zauralye (rus: Зауралье)	(Kazakhstan) Petropavl	(Russia) Russian Railways
095/096/135/136	Altay (rus: Алтай)	(Russia) Barnaul	(Russia) Russian Railways
101/102	Premium (ex. Sochi) (rus: Премиум (Сочи))	(Russia) Adler	(Russia) Russian Railways
103/104	Moskovia (rus: Московия)	(Russia) Adler	(Russia) Russian Railways
329/330	Tajikistan (taj: Тоҷикистон, rus: Таджикистан)	(Tajikistan) Dushanbe	(Tajikistan) Tajik Railways
989/990		(Russia) Vladivostok via Kazan	(Russia) Russian Railways

=== Other destinations ===
Country	Destinations
Kazakhstan	Nur-Sultan, Balqash, Karagandy, Kokshetau, Pavlodar, Ridder
Russia	Anapa, Bereshino, Biysk, Bugulma, Dimitrovgrad, Grozny, Kirov, Kolomna, Krugloe Pole, Kurovskoye, Kumertau, Makhachkala, Naberezhnye Chelny, Nalchik, Nazran, Neryungri, Novokuznetsk, Orsk, Ramenskoye, Ryazan, Sarov, Sergach, Tolyatti, Tommot, Tynda, Ulan-Ude, Zemetchino
Tajikistan	Khujand

=== Suburban destinations ===
Suburban commuter trains (elektrichka) connect Kazansky station with the towns of Lyubertsy, Zhukovsky, Gzhel, Kurovskoye, Shatura, Cherusti, Vekovka, Bykovo, Ramenskoye, Bronnitsy, Voskresensk, Yegoryevsk, Kolomna and Ryazan.

== Gallery ==
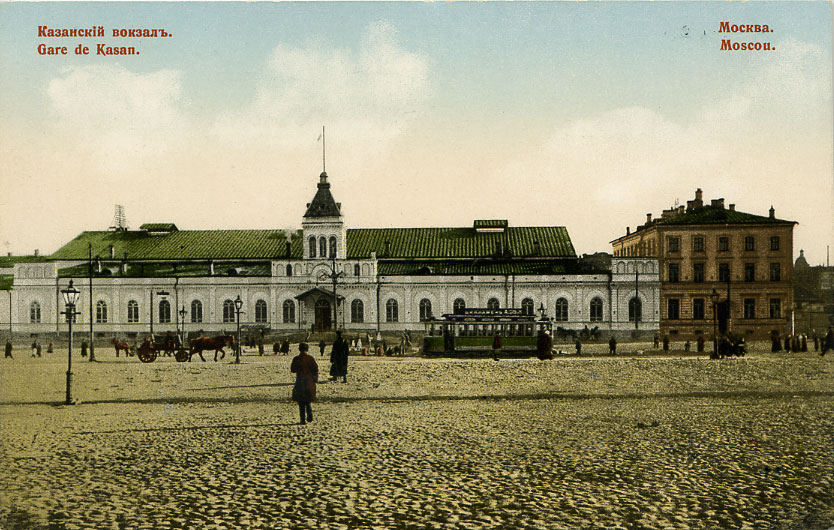
Historical view of the station (1913)

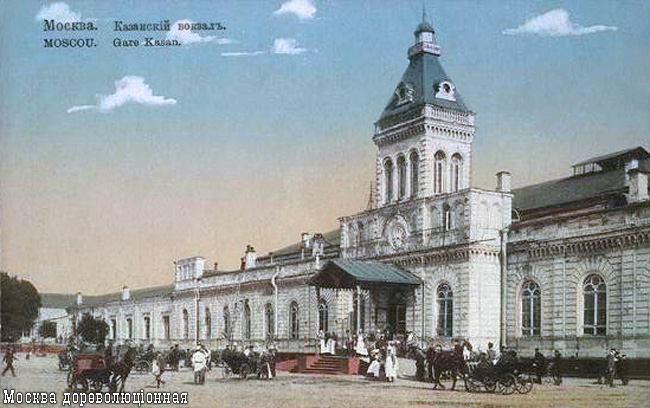
Historical view of the station (1913)

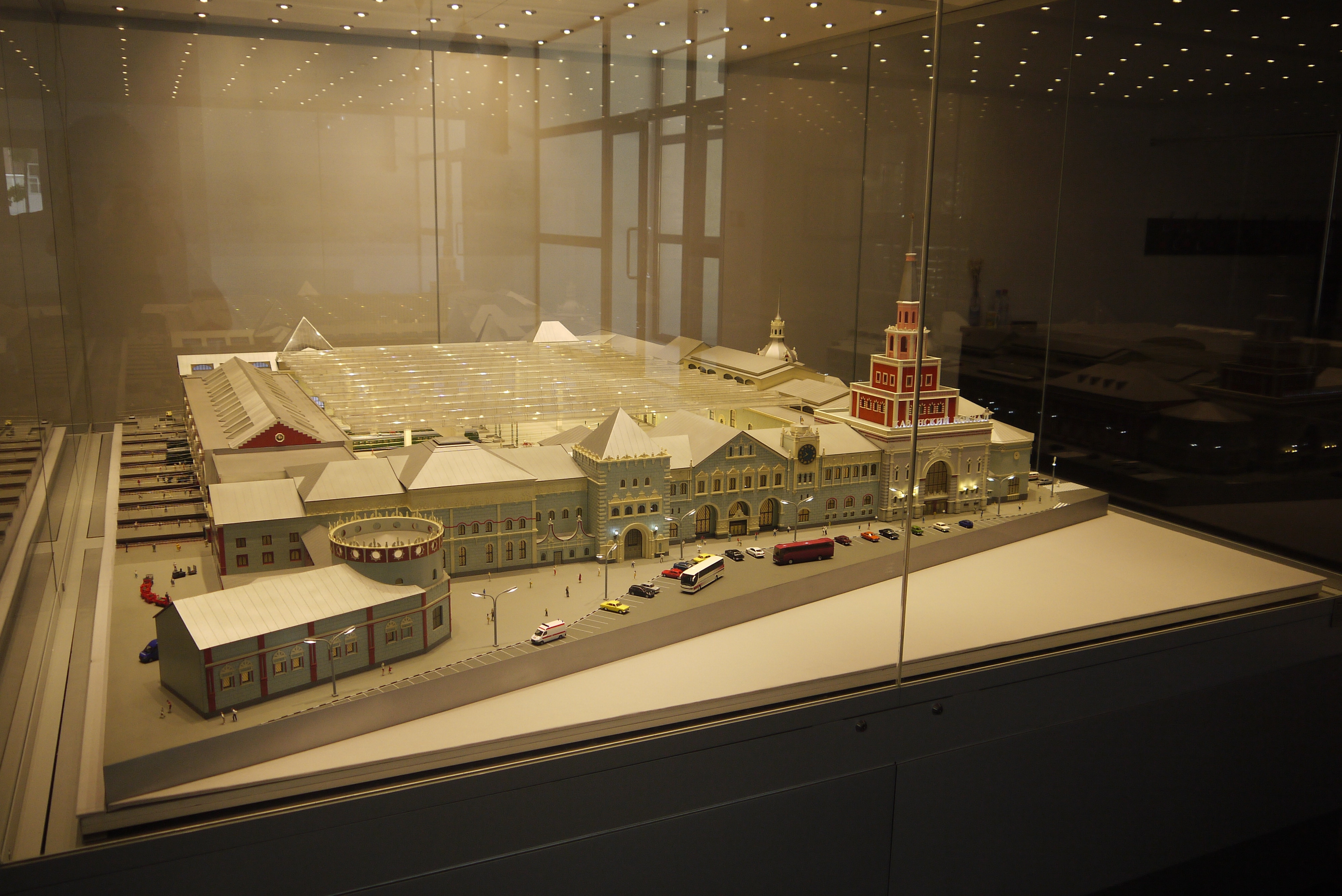
Model of Kazansky station at the Museum of the Moscow Railway at Paveletsky Rail Terminal, Moscow

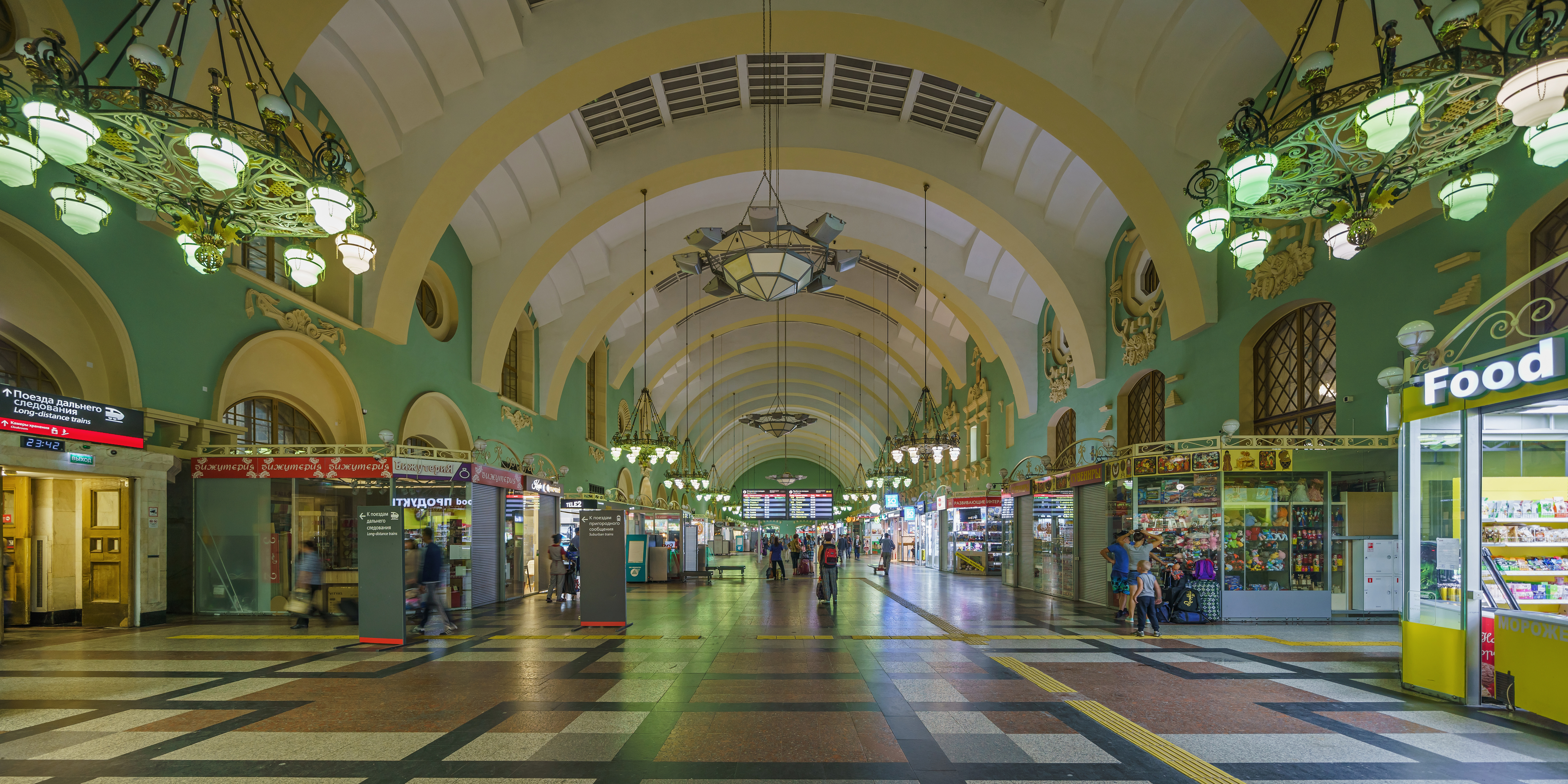
Interior
