= Sokolinaya Gora =

Sokolinaya Gora may refer to:

- Sokolinaya Gora District, a district in Moscow, Russia
- Sokolinaya Gora (Moscow Metro), a station of the Moscow Metro, Moscow, Russia
