= Shosse Entuziastov (Moscow Central Circle) =

Station on the Moscow Central Circle

Shosse Entuziastov Шоссе Энтузиастов
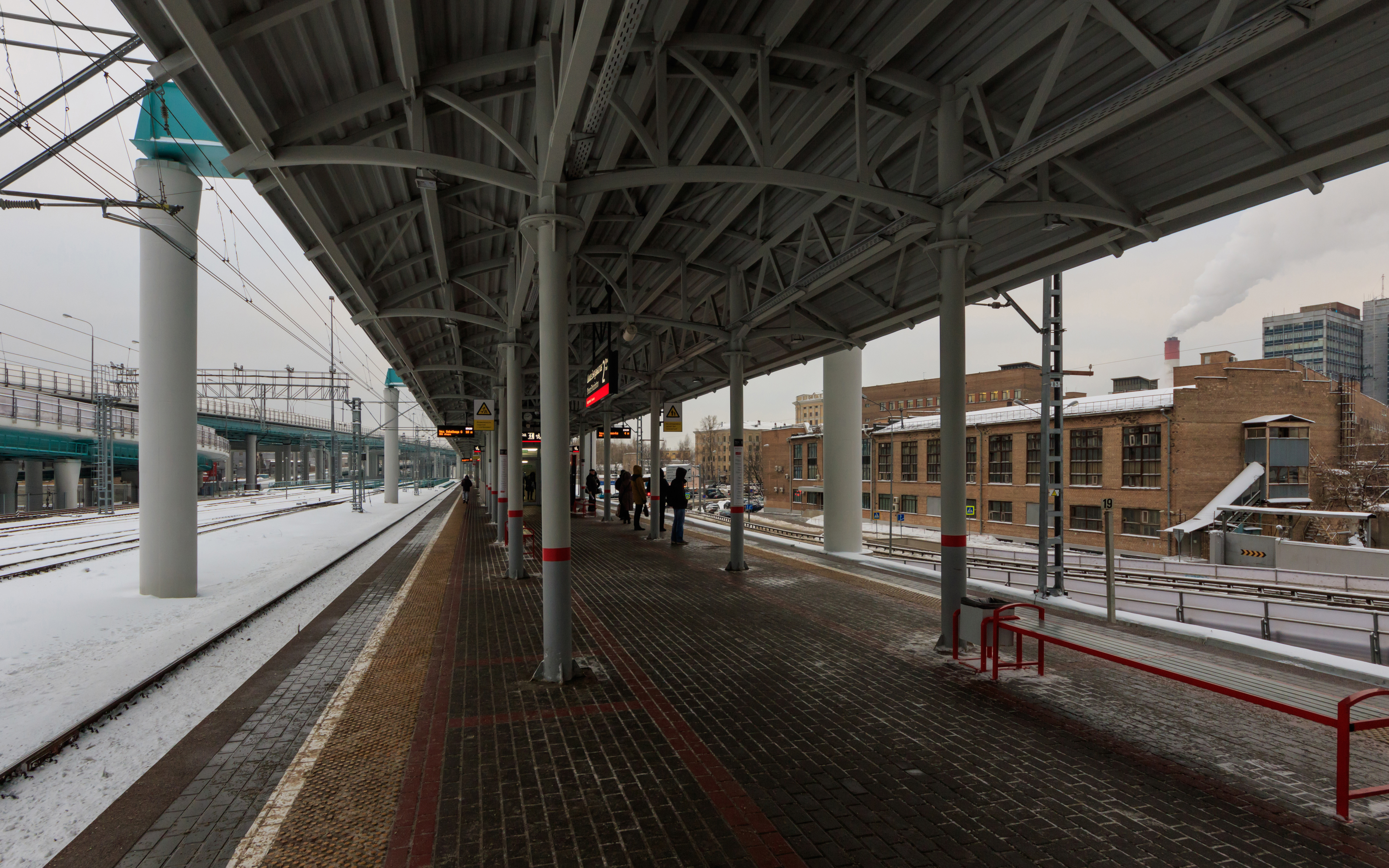

General information
- Coordinates: 55.7589°N 37.7463°E
- System: Moscow Metro
- Line: Moscow Central Circle
- Platforms: 1 island platform
- Tracks: 2

History
- Opened: 10 September 2016; 9 years ago

Services
Preceding station	Moscow Metro	Following station
Sokolinaya Gora anticlockwise / outer	Moscow Central Circle	Andronovka clockwise / inner
Out-of-station interchange
Aviamotornaya towards Tretyakovskaya	Kalininsko-Solntsevskaya line (Kalininsky radius) transfer at Shosse Entuziastov	Perovo towards Novokosino
Route map
Location
- Location within Moscow Metro

Shosse Entuziastov (Russian: Шоссе Энтузиастов) is a station on the Moscow Central Circle of the Moscow Metro that opened in September 2016.

== Name ==
The station was named for the road on which it is situated.

== Transfer ==
Passengers may make out-of-station transfers to Shosse Entuziastov station on the Kalininsko-Solntsevskaya Line.

== Gallery ==
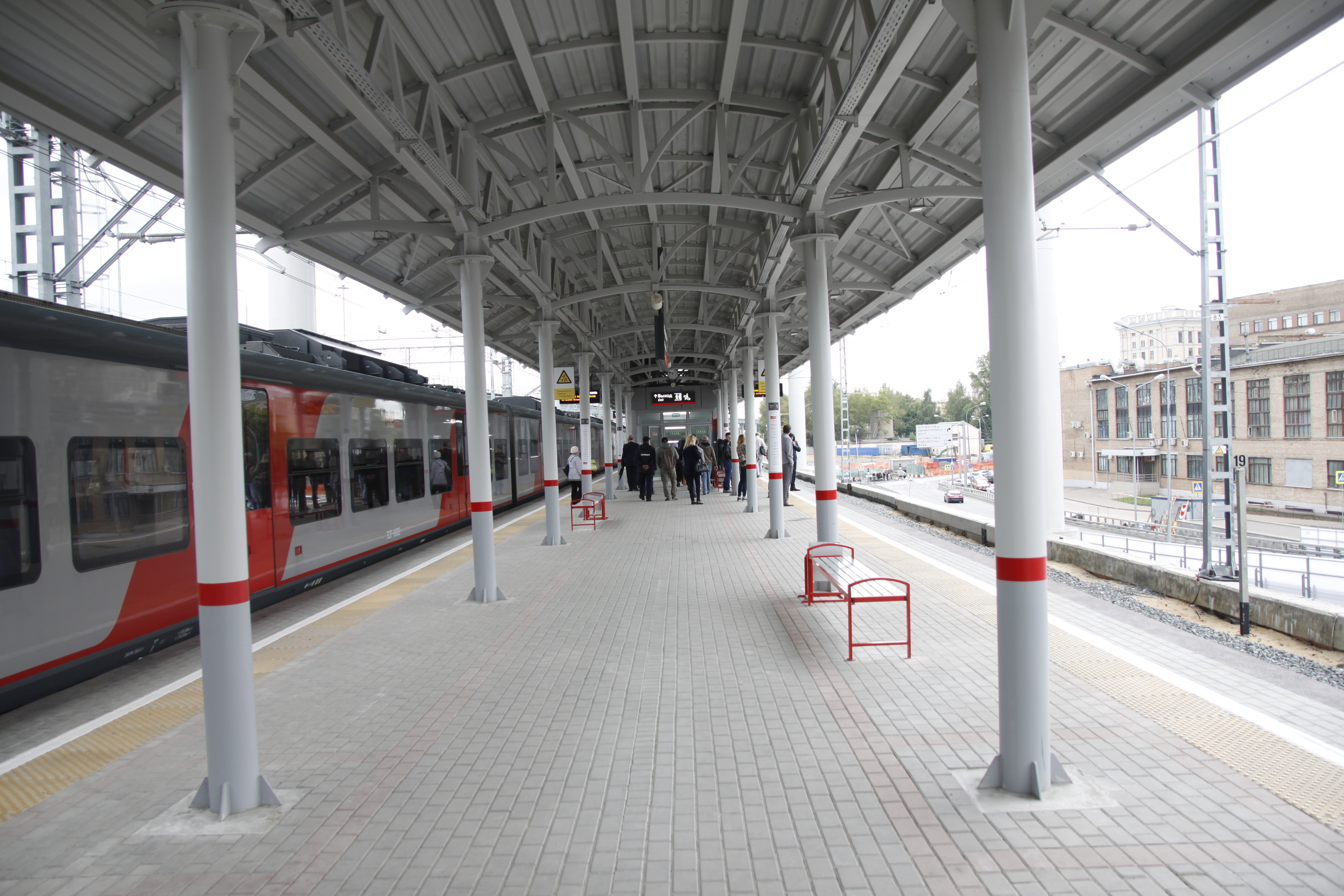

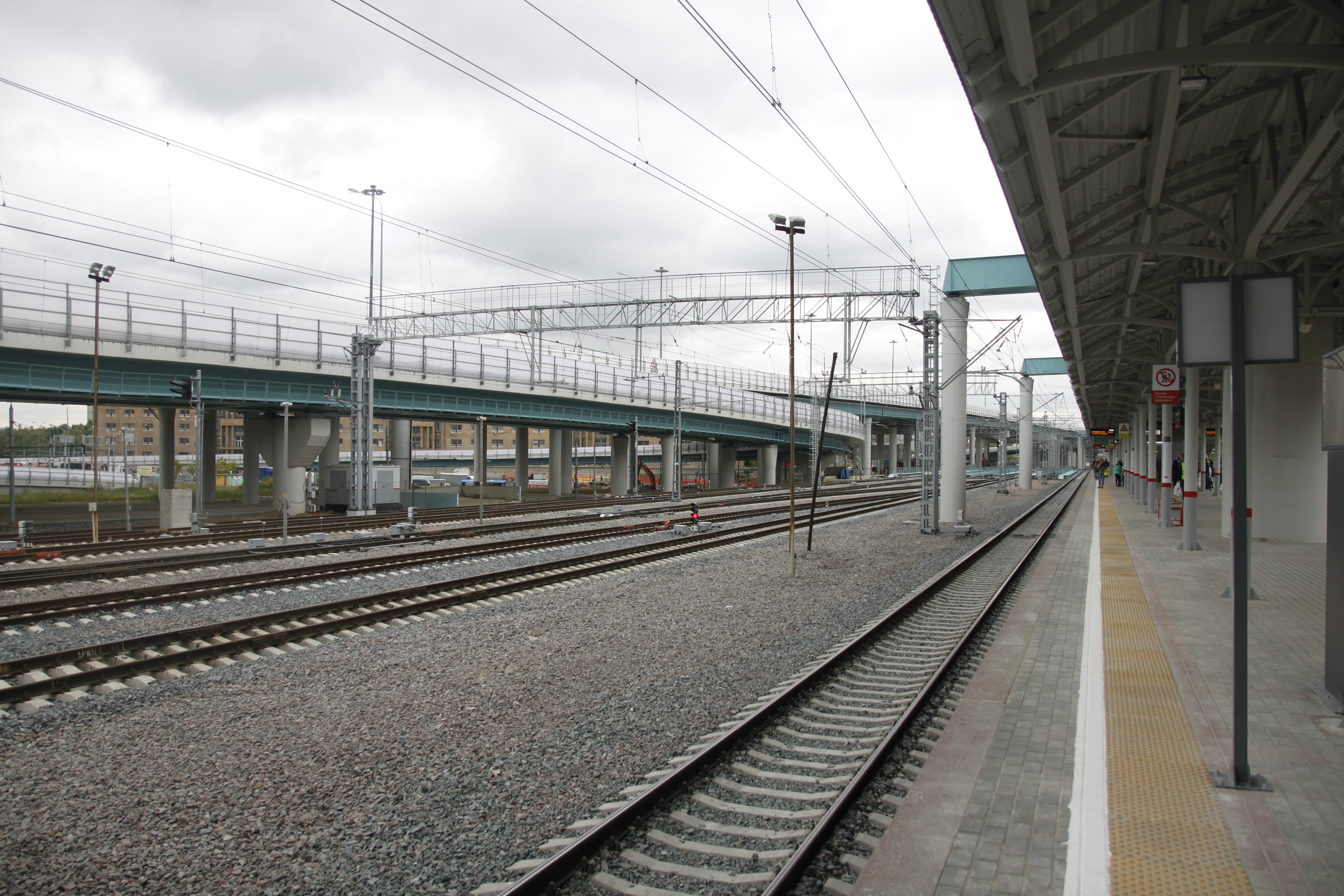

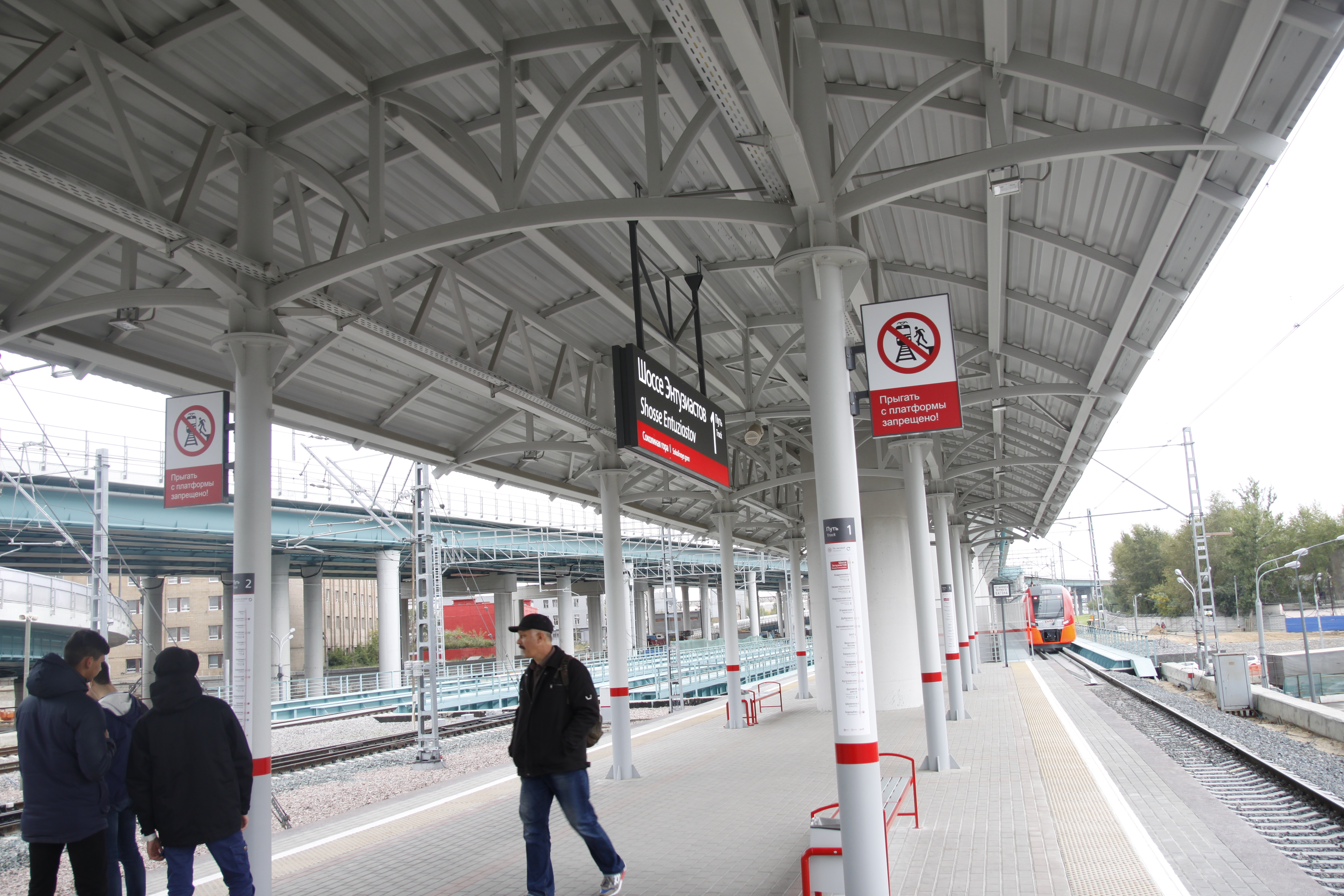
