= Elektrozavodskaya railway station =

Railway station in Moscow, Russia

Elektrozavodskaya Электрозаводская

General information
- Location: Basmanny-Sokolinaya Gora district border, Moscow; Russia
- Coordinates: 55.781111°N 37.705278°E
- System: Moscow Railway station
- Owner: Russian Railways
- Operator: Moscow Railway
- Lines: Kazansky Suburban Line; Ryazansky Suburban Line
- Platforms: 2 (1 unused)
- Tracks: 4 (2 unused)
- Connections: Metro: Elektrozavodskaya; Bus: 59, 86, 783, T25; Trolleybus: 22, 32, 87, 88; Share taxi: 171m, 322m, 325m, 636m, 752m

Construction
- Platform levels: 1

Other information
- Station code: 194028
- Fare zone: 1

History
- Opened: 1949

Services
Preceding station	Russian Railways	Following station
Moscow Kazansky Terminus	Kazansky Suburban	Sortirovochnaya towards Krivandino
Moscow Kazansky Terminus	Ryazansky Suburban	Sortirovochnaya towards Ryazan 1
Future services
Preceding station	Moscow Central Diameters	Following station
Mitkovo towards Kryukovo	Line D3	Sortirovochnaya towards Ippodrom
Proposed
Mitkovo towards Pushkino	Line D5	Vladimirsky Puteprovod towards Domodedovo
Location
- Location within Moscow Ring Road

Elektrozavodskaya is a Moscow Railway station on the Kazansky and Ryazansky suburban railway lines in Moscow, Russia. It is located on the Basmanny-Sokolinaya Gora district border (Central and Eastern administrative okrugs respectively), 3.5 kilometres (2.2 mi) from Moscow Kazanskaya railway station.

There are exits at the Semyonovskaya Embankment, Golyanovsky Lane, Bolshaya Semyonovskaya Street.

== Gallery ==
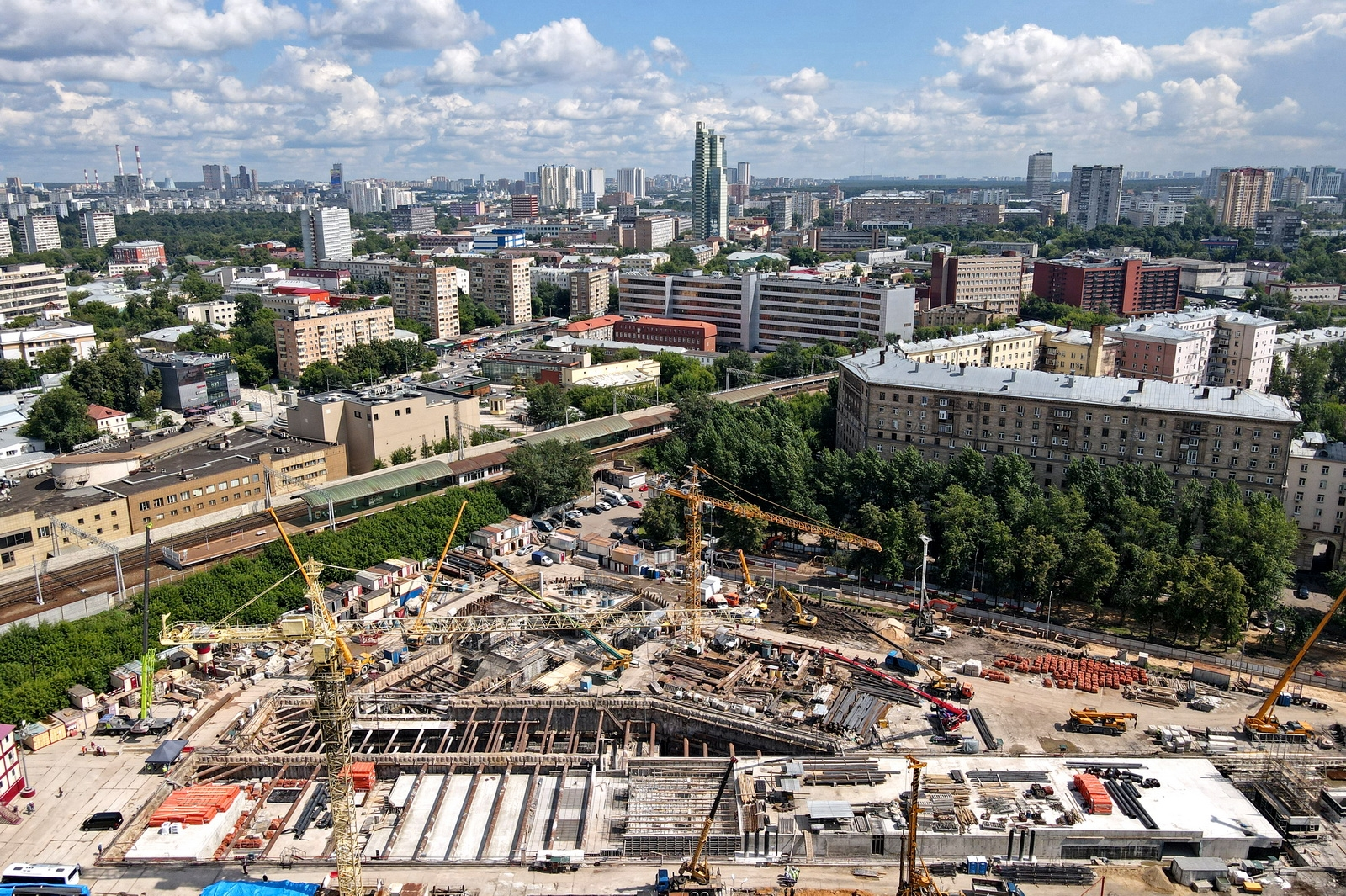

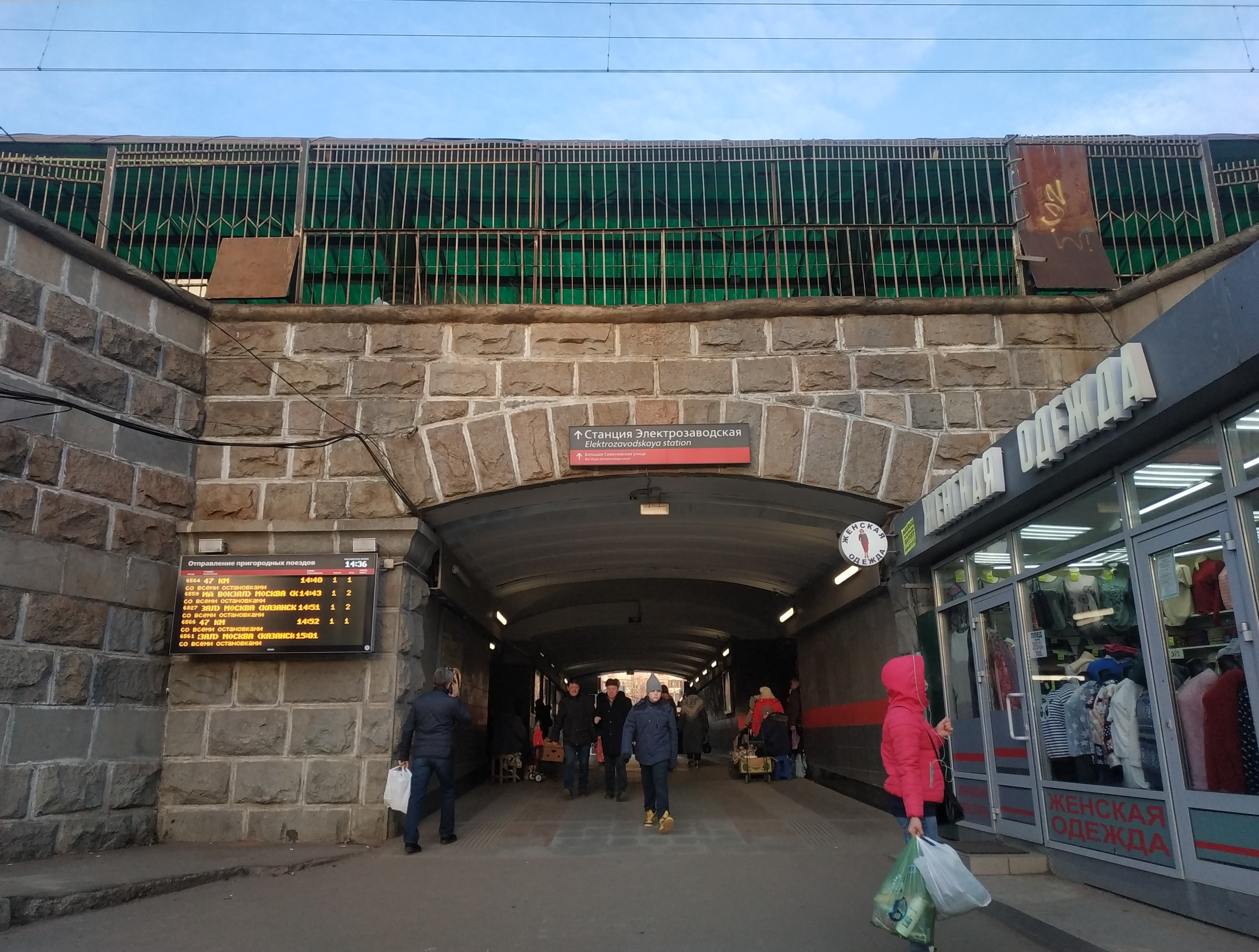
