= Shosse Entuziastov (Moscow Metro) =

Moscow Metro station

Shosse Entuziastov Шоссе Энтузиастов
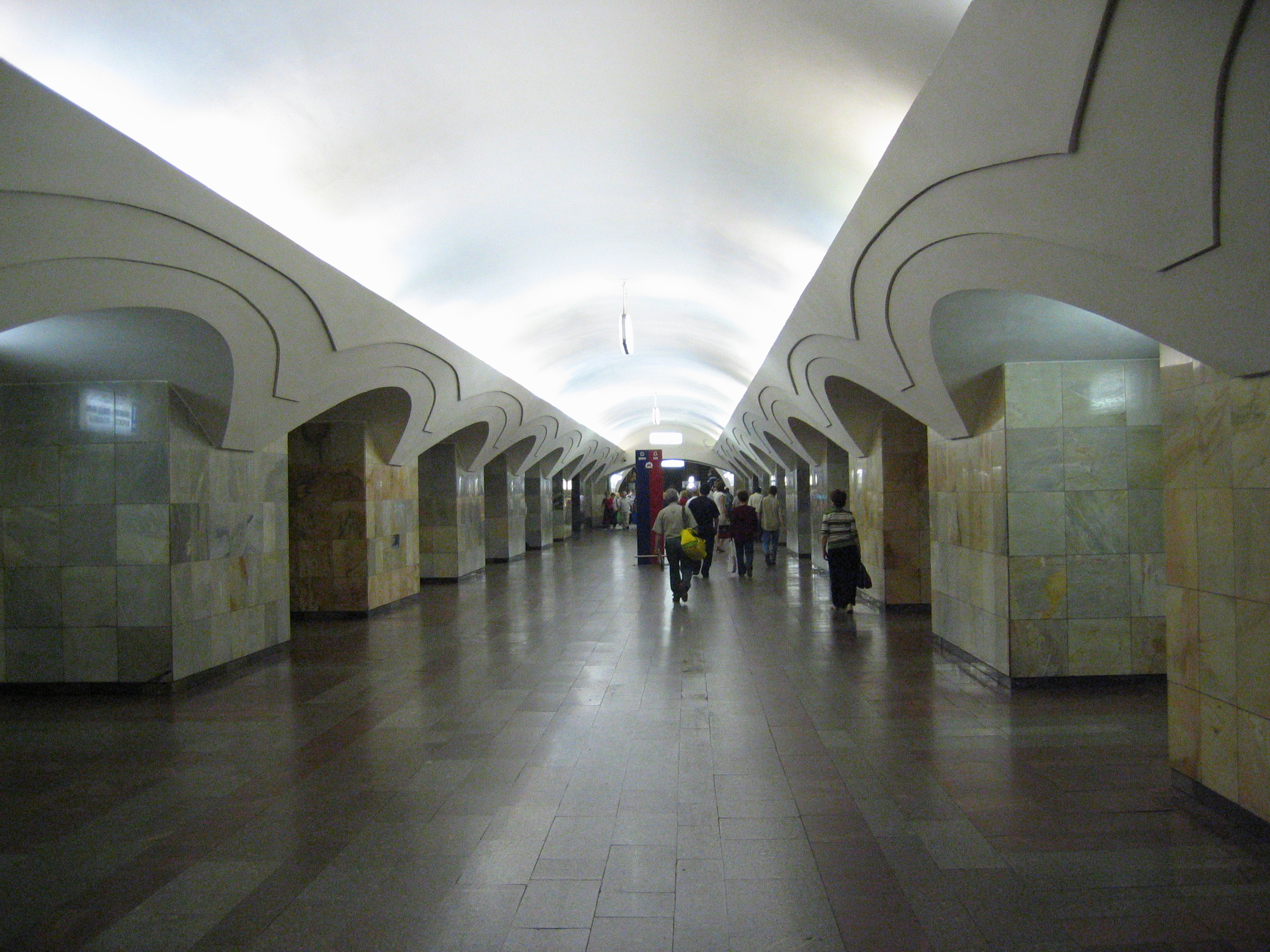

General information
- Location: Sokolinaya Gora District; Perovo District; Eastern Administrative Okrug; Moscow; Russia
- Coordinates: 55.7576°N 37.7500°E
- System: Moscow Metro station
- Owner: Moskovsky Metropoliten
- Line: Kalininskaya line
- Platforms: 1 island platform
- Tracks: 2
- Connections: Bus: 36, 46, 83, 125, 141, 214, 237, 659, 702; Trolleybus: 30, 53, 68; Tram: 8, 24, 34, 36, 37

Construction
- Depth: 53 metres (174 ft)
- Platform levels: 1
- Parking: No

Other information
- Station code: 081

History
- Opened: 30 December 1979; 46 years ago

Services
Preceding station	Moscow Metro	Following station
Aviamotornaya towards Tretyakovskaya	Kalininsko-Solntsevskaya line (Kalininsky radius)	Perovo towards Novokosino
Out-of-station interchange
Sokolinaya Gora anticlockwise / outer	Moscow Central Circle transfer at Shosse Entuziastov	Andronovka clockwise / inner
Route map
Location
- Location within Moscow Metro

Shosse Entuziastov (Russian: Шоссе Энтузиастов) is a Moscow Metro station on the Kalininsko-Solntsevskaya Line. It is located between Aviamotornaya and Perovo stations.

The station is named after the Entuziastov Highway, under which it is located. The design theme of the station is the struggle for freedom during Russia's history. Shosse Entuziastov station is decorated in various colours and shades of marble, with colours ranging from dark grey to yellow. Sculptures and pictures relating to revolutionary subjects adorn the walls. On the western end of the central hall there is a large sculpture — "Flame of Freedom" — designed by A. Kuznetsov.

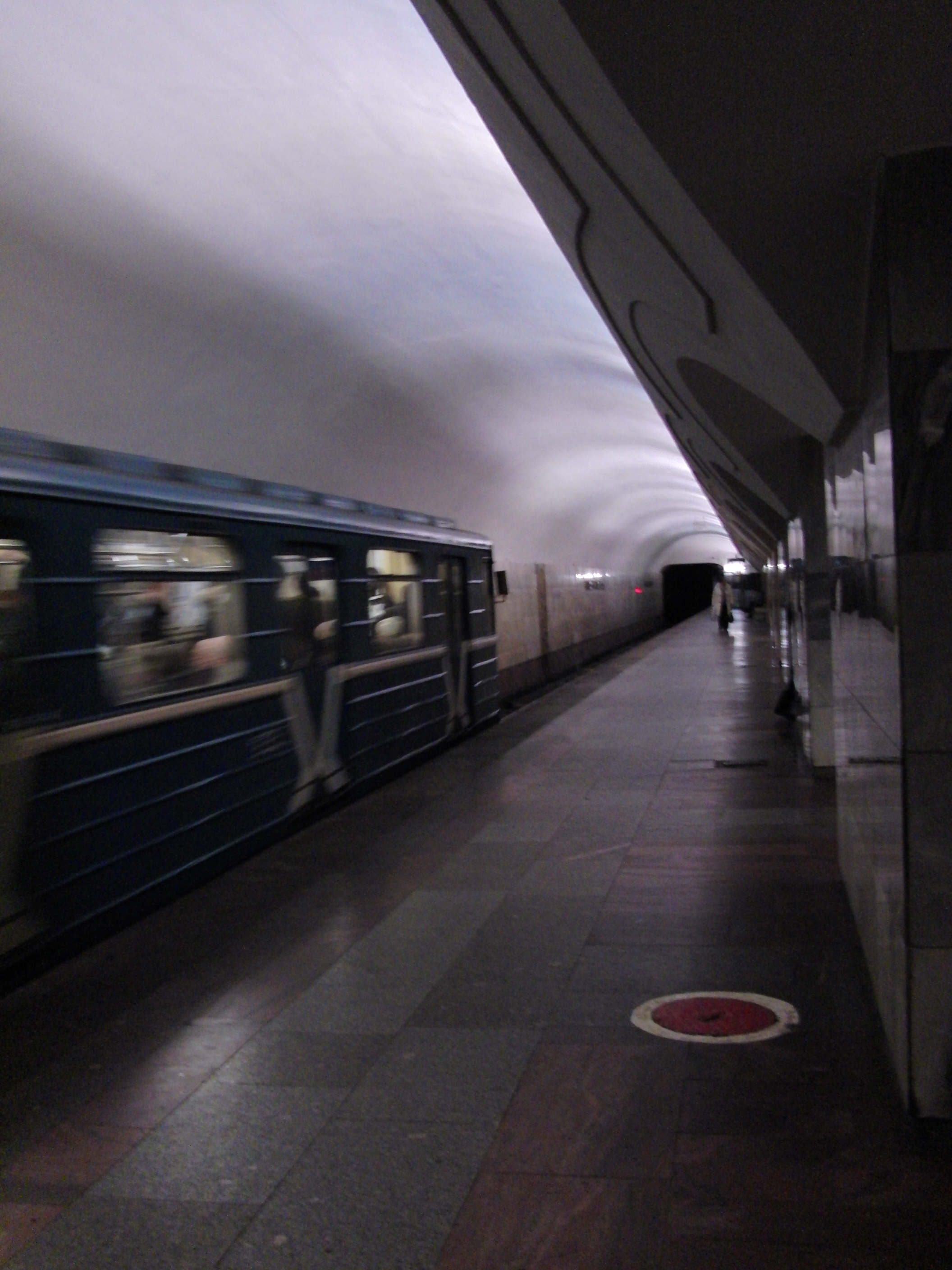
Platform of Shosse Entuziastov
