= Kosino railway station =

Railway station in Moscow

Kosino Косино

General information
- Location: Moscow; Russia
- Coordinates: 55.7059°N 37.8476°E
- System: Moscow Railway station
- Owner: Russian Railways
- Operator: Moscow Railway
- Platforms: 2 (side platforms)
- Tracks: 2
- Connections: Lermontovsky Prospekt; Kosino

Construction
- Structure type: At-grade

History
- Opened: 1894

Services
Preceding station	Russian Railways	Following station
Vykhino towards Moscow Kazansky	Kazansky Suburban	Ukhtomskaya towards Krivandino
Vykhino towards Moscow Kazansky	Ryazansky Suburban	Ukhtomskaya towards Ryazan 1
Proposed
Preceding station	Moscow Central Diameters	Following station
Vykhino towards Kryukovo	Line D3	Ukhtomskaya towards Ippodrom
Location
- Location within Moscow Ring Road

Kosino (Russian: Косино) is a Moscow Railway station on the Kazansky and Ryazansky suburban railway lines in Moscow, Russia. It was opened in 1894 and will be rebuilt in 2023.

== Gallery ==
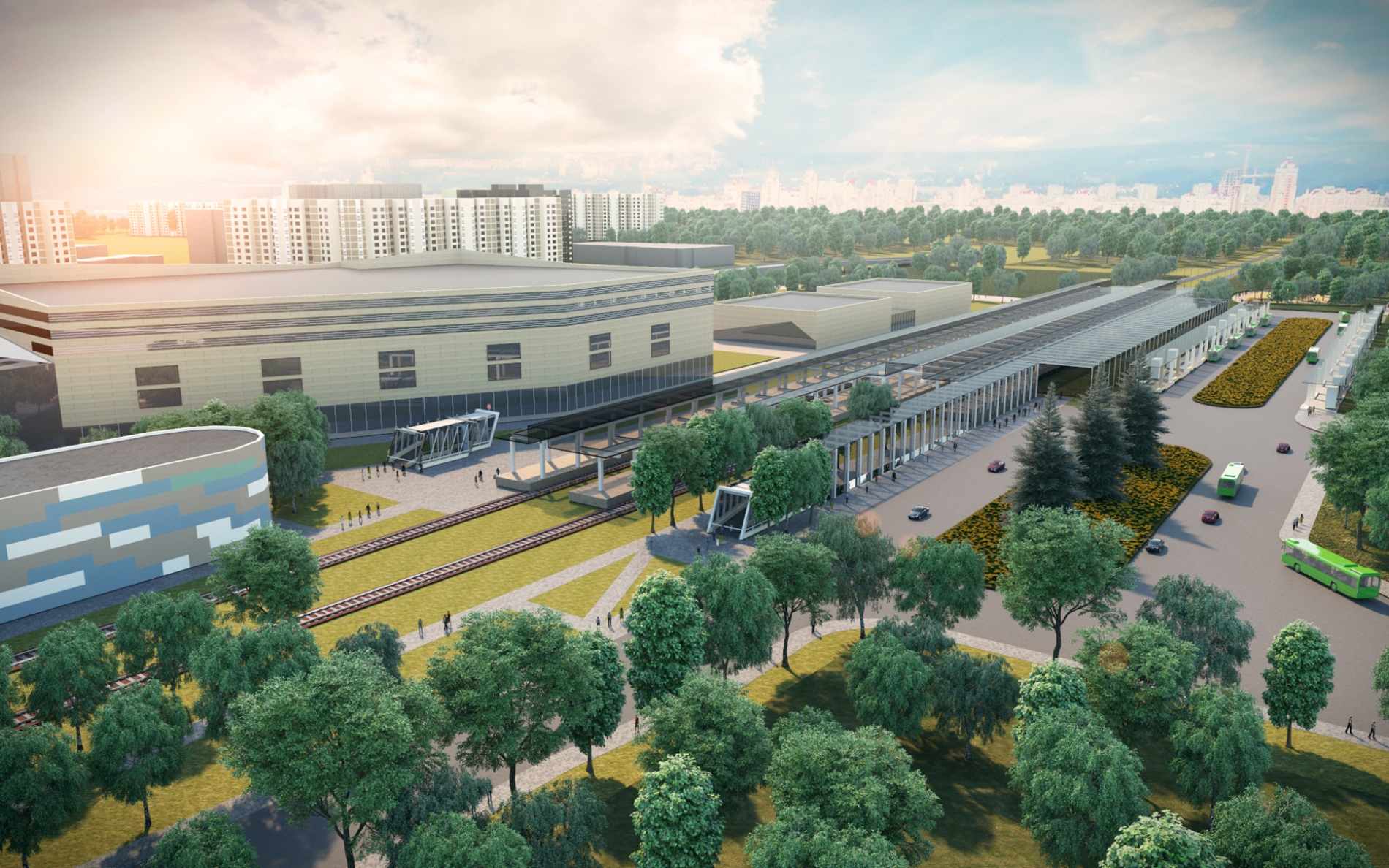
The project of a new station.

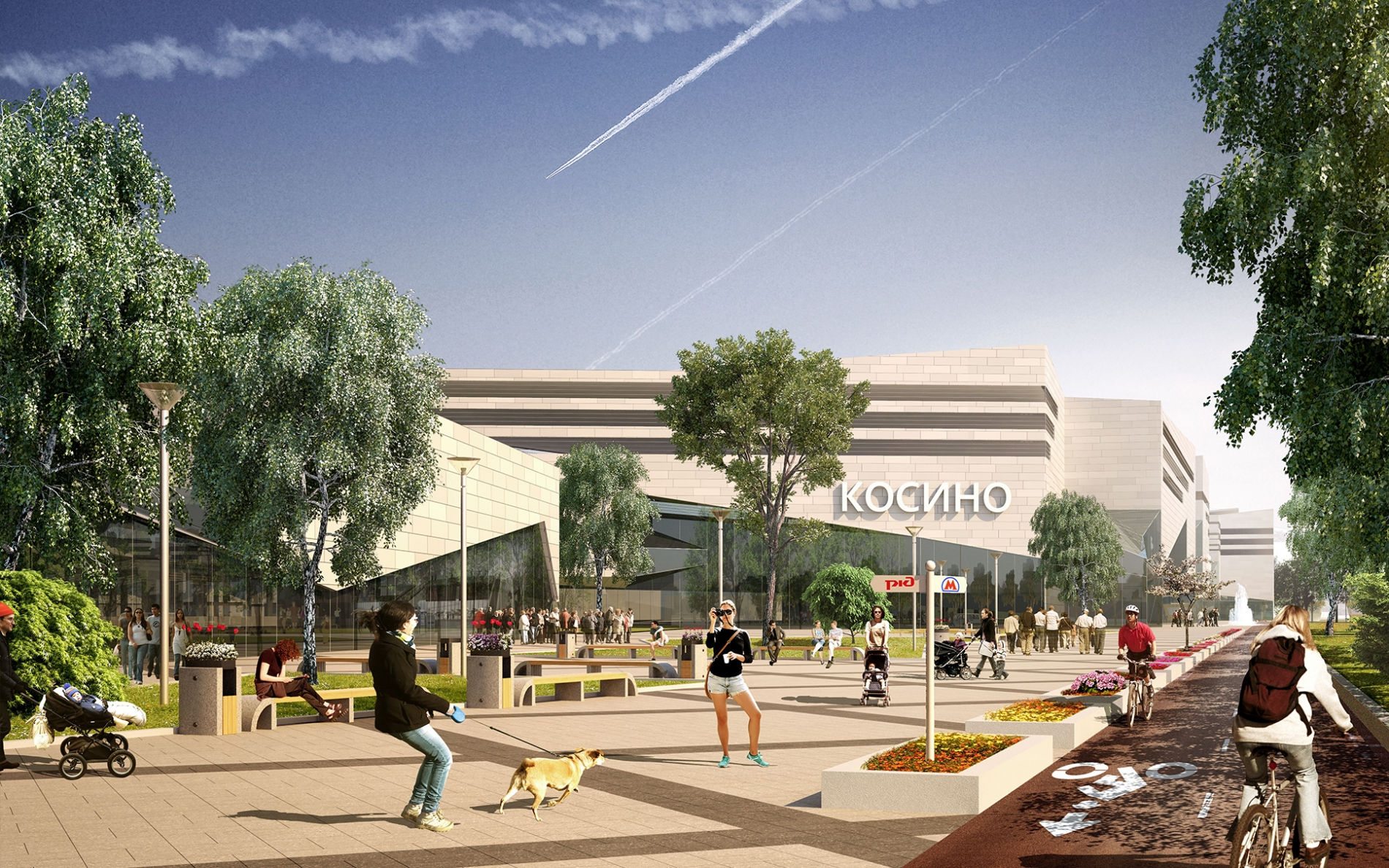

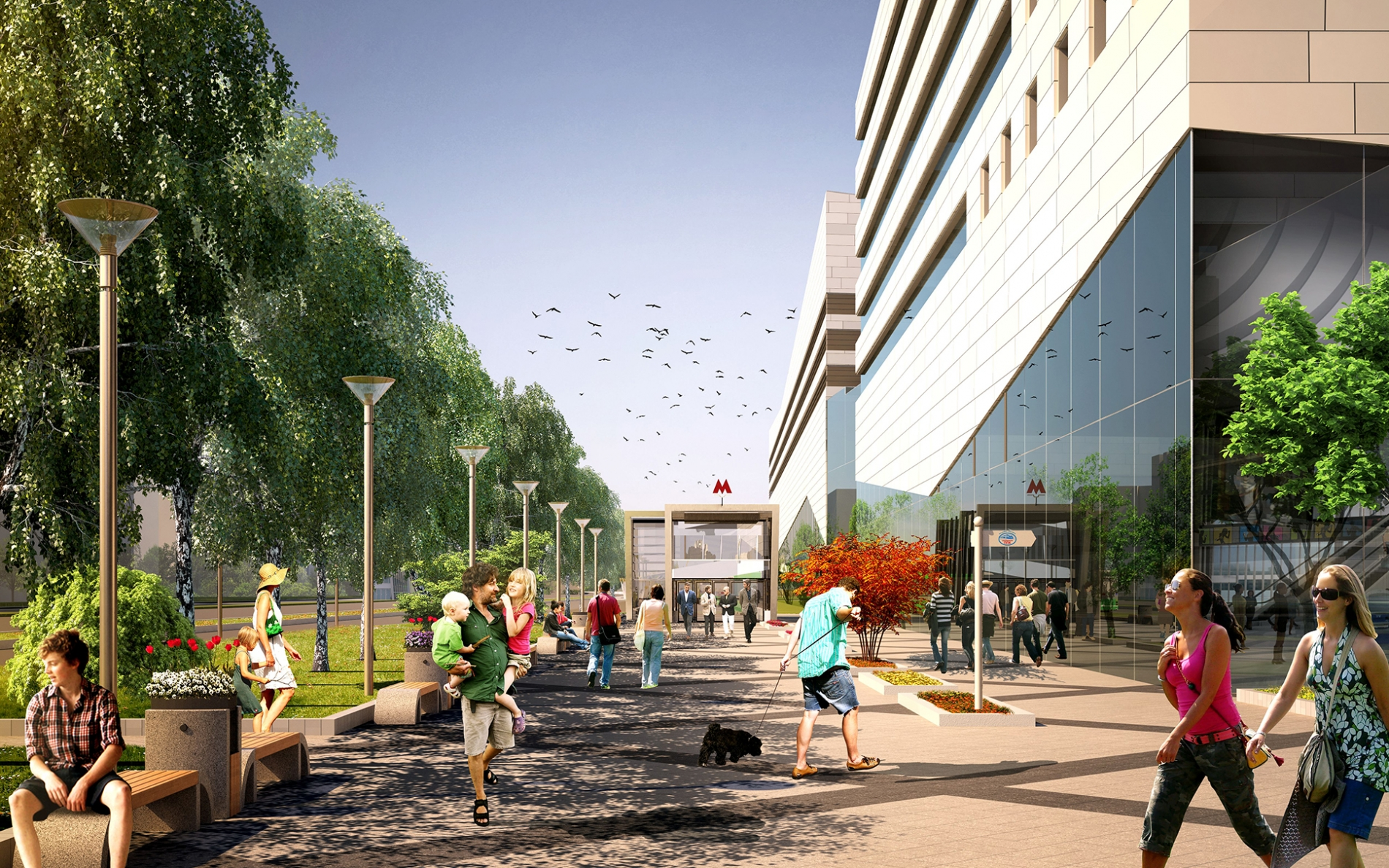
