= Kurovsky (inhabited locality) =

Kurovsky (Russian: Куровский) or Kurovskoy (Куровской; both masculine), Kurovskaya (Куровская; feminine), or Kurovskoye (Куровское; neuter) is the name of several inhabited localities in Russia.

Urban localities

- Kurovskoye, Moscow Oblast, a town in Orekhovo-Zuyevsky District of Moscow Oblast
- Kurovskoy, a settlement in Dzerzhinsky District of Kaluga Oblast

Rural localities

- Kurovsky (rural locality), a settlement in Berezovsky Rural Okrug of Kireyevsky District of Tula Oblast
- Kurovskoye, Dzerzhinsky District, Kaluga Oblast, a village in Dzerzhinsky District, Kaluga Oblast
- Kurovskoye, Kozelsky District, Kaluga Oblast, a village in Kozelsky District, Kaluga Oblast
- Kurovskoye, Sverdlovsk Oblast, a selo in Kamyshlovsky District of Sverdlovsk Oblast
- Kurovskoye, Vologda Oblast, a village in Kubensky Selsoviet of Vologodsky District of Vologda Oblast
