= Vekovka =

Vekovka Вековка
- Settlement
- Location within Vladimir Oblast Location within Russia
- Coordinates: 55°29′N 40°48′E
- Country: Russia
- Region: Vladimir Oblast
- District: Gus-Khrustalny District
- Time zone: UTC+3:00

Vekovka (Russian: Вековка) is a rural locality (a settlement) in Grigoryevskoye Rural Settlement, Gus-Khrustalny District, Vladimir Oblast, Russia. The population was 895 as of 2010.

== Geography ==
Vekovka is located 34 km southeast of Gus-Khrustalny (the district's administrative centre) by road. Stepanovo is the nearest rural locality.
