= Zemetchino =

Set index of articles associated with the same name

Zemetchino (Russian: Земетчино) is the name of several inhabited localities in Russia.

Urban localities

- Zemetchino, Penza Oblast, a work settlement in Zemetchinsky District of Penza Oblast

Rural localities

- Zemetchino, Tambov Oblast, a selo in Kershinsky Selsoviet of Bondarsky District of Tambov Oblast
