= Perovo (Moscow Metro) =

Moscow Metro station

Perovo Перово
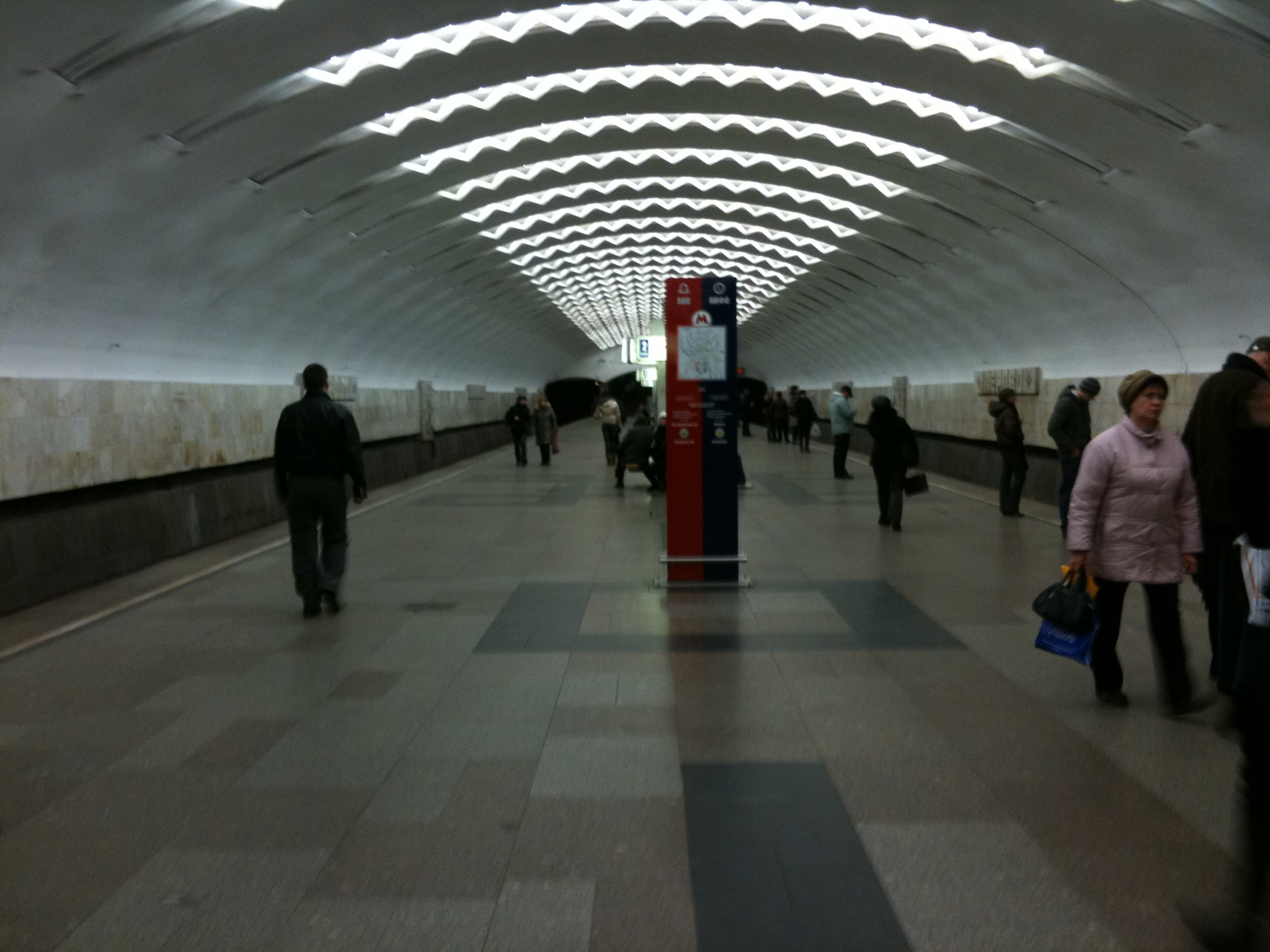

General information
- Location: Zelyony Avenue, Perovo District, Eastern Administrative Okrug; Moscow; Russia
- Coordinates: 55.7511°N 37.7866°E
- System: Moscow Metro station
- Owner: Moskovsky Metropoliten
- Line: Kalininskaya line
- Platforms: 1
- Tracks: 2
- Connections: Bus: 141, 617, 620, 659, 787; Trolleybus: 77

Construction
- Structure type: Shallow single-vault station
- Depth: 9 metres (30 ft)
- Platform levels: 1
- Parking: No

Other information
- Station code: 080

History
- Opened: 30 December 1979; 46 years ago

Services
Preceding station	Moscow Metro	Following station
Shosse Entuziastov towards Tretyakovskaya	Kalininsko-Solntsevskaya line (Kalininsky radius)	Novogireyevo towards Novokosino
Route map
Location
- Location within Moscow Metro

Perovo (Russian: Перо́во) is a Moscow Metro station on Kalininsko-Solntsevskaya Line. It was opened on 30 December 1979 along with the Kalininsky radius at a depth of nine metres.

== Name ==
Named after Perovo District in the Eastern Administrative Okrug.

== Building ==
The architects Nina Aleshina and Volovich adopted a single-vault design with hinged aluminium lighting elements. The decorative design of the station is devoted to the Russian folk arts. The walls are decorated with blocks with screw-threaded rocks, and original patterns above the entrance portals (by L. Novikova and B. Filatov). The walls are revetted with white marble above and black gabbro below. The floor, which has several high marble stalls surrounded by benches, is faced with grey, black and brown granite.

The station has two exits, both interlinked with the underground subways under the Zelyony Avenue and 2nd Vladimirskaya street. Presently the station has a relatively low passenger traffic of 49300 passengers.
