= Sokolinaya Gora (Moscow Central Circle) =

Station on the Moscow Central Circle

Sokolinaya Gora Соколиная Гора
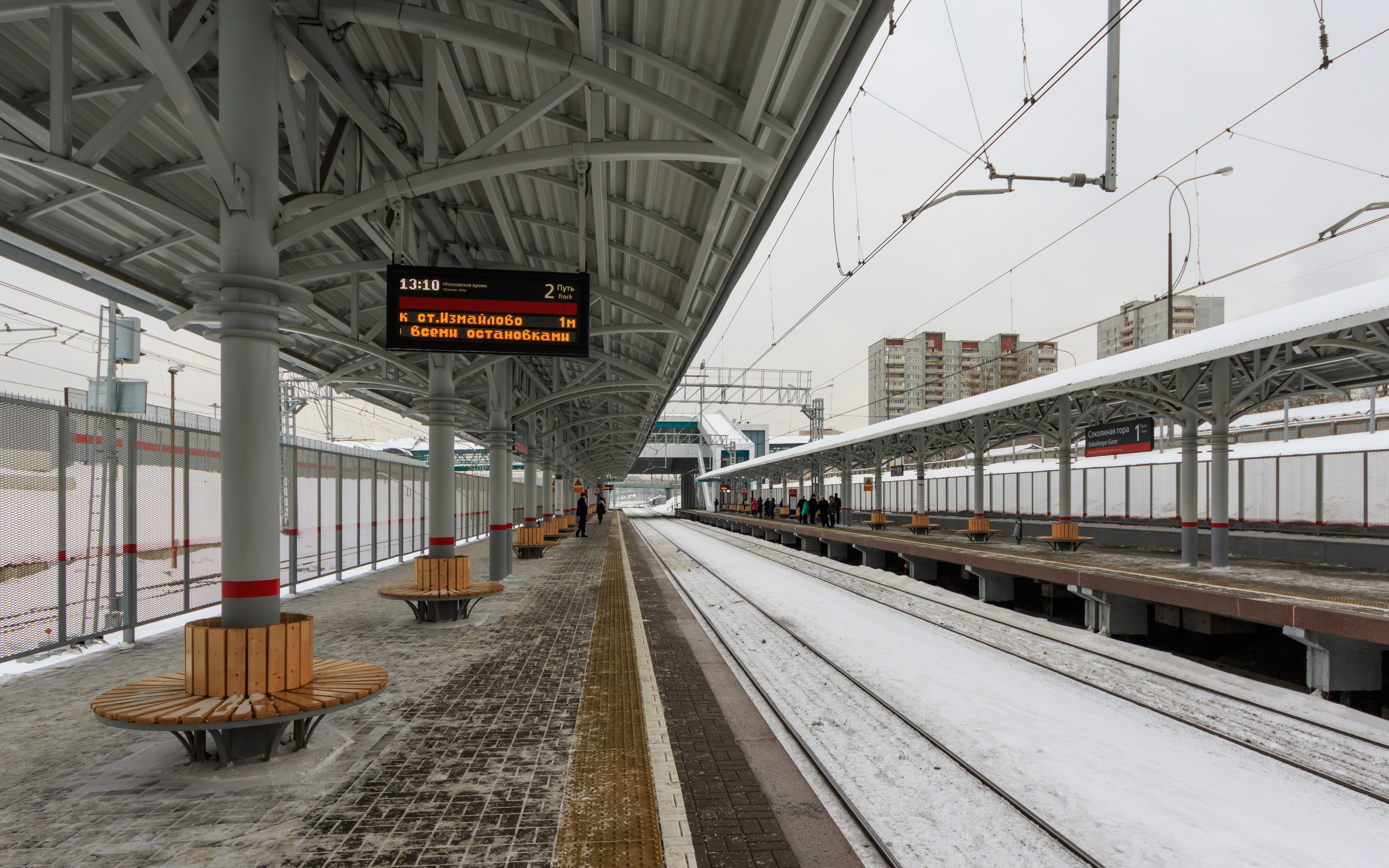

General information
- Coordinates: 55.7714°N 37.7451°E
- System: Moscow Metro
- Line: Moscow Central Circle
- Platforms: 2 side platforms
- Tracks: 2

History
- Opened: 11 October 2016; 9 years ago

Services
| Preceding station | Moscow Metro | Following station |
|---|---|---|
| Izmaylovo anticlockwise / outer | Moscow Central Circle | Shosse Entuziastov clockwise / inner |
Route map
Location
- Location within Moscow Metro

Sokolinaya Gora (Russian: Соколиная Гора)(literal meaning: "falcon mountain" is a station on the Moscow Central Circle of the Moscow Metro located in the district of the same name. It was opened on 11 October 2016, one month after opening of the MCC. As of 2017, Sokolinaya Gora is 25th popular among 31 stations of the Circle: the average passenger traffic was 8000 people per day and 240,000 people per month.

== Gallery ==
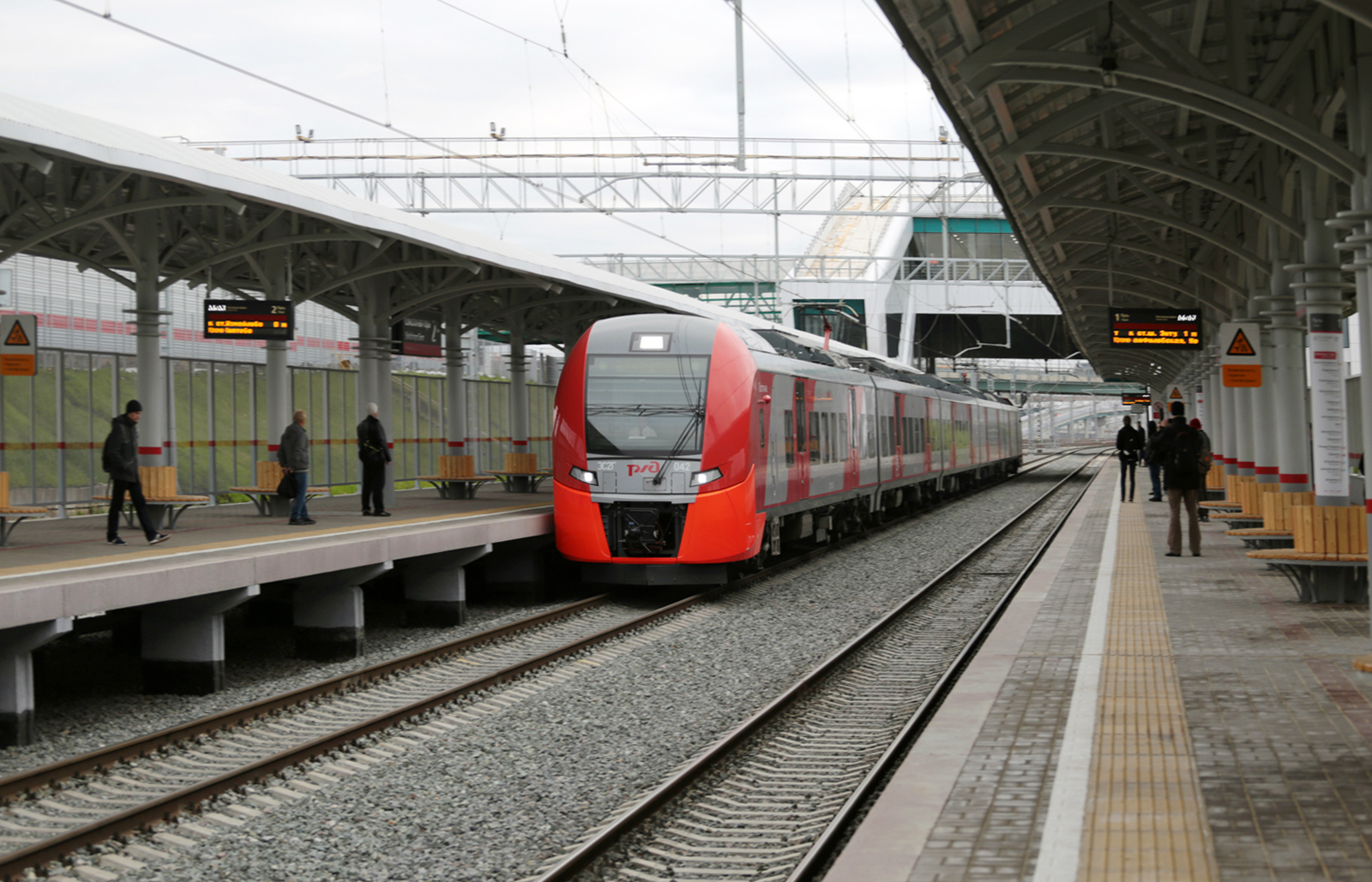

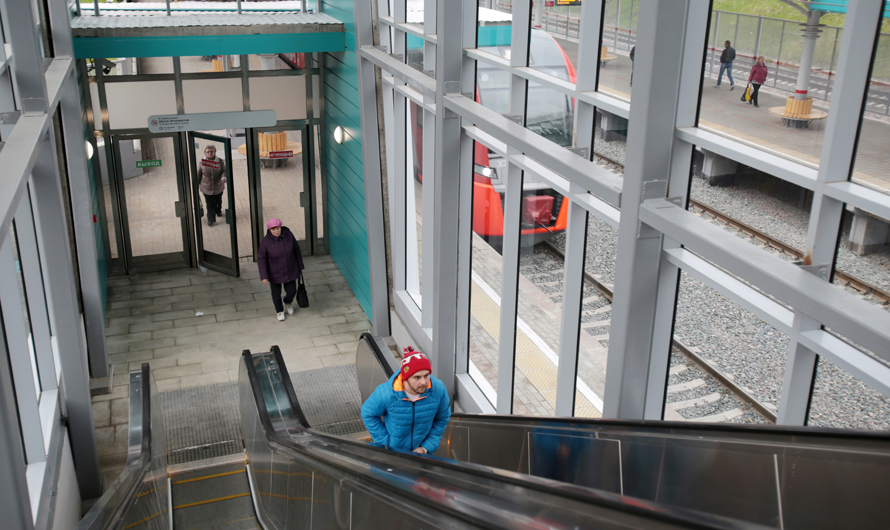

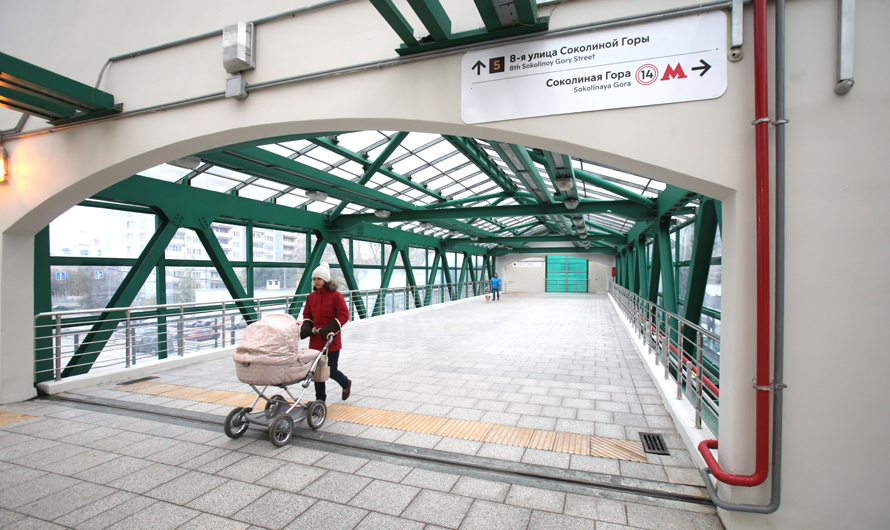
