= Andronovka (Moscow Central Circle) =

Moscow Metro station

Andronovka Андроновка
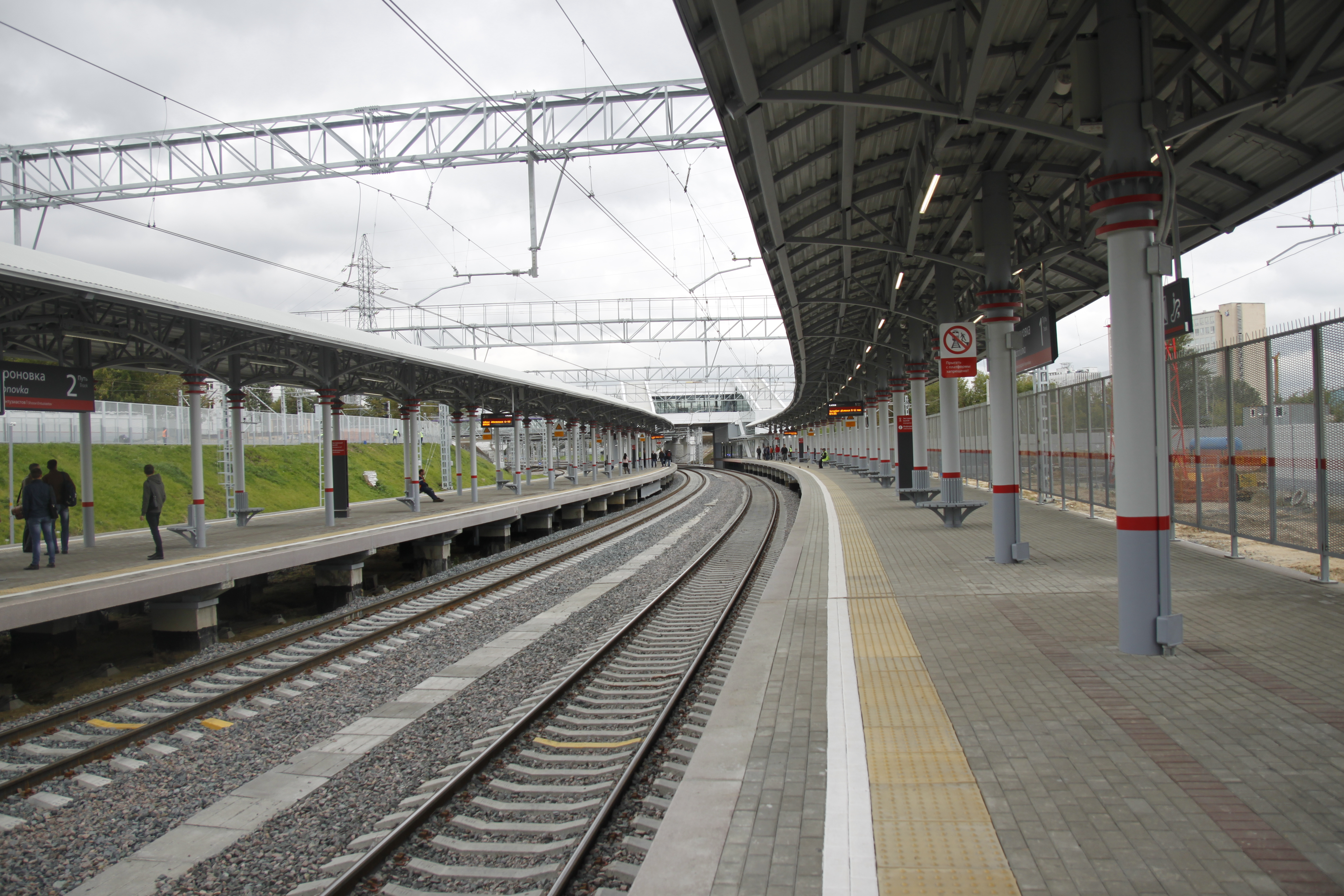

General information
- Coordinates: 55.7473°N 37.7380°E
- System: Moscow Metro
- Line: Moscow Central Circle
- Platforms: 2 side platforms
- Tracks: 2

History
- Opened: 10 September 2016; 9 years ago

Services
Preceding station	Moscow Metro	Following station
Shosse Entuziastov anticlockwise / outer	Moscow Central Circle	Nizhegorodskaya clockwise / inner
Route map
Location
- Location within Moscow Metro

Andronovka (Russian: Андроновка) is a station on the Moscow Central Circle of the Moscow Metro.

This station offers a transfer to the "Frezer" station of the urban/suburban rail line (one of 11 rail lines radiating from central Moscow). "Frezer" is on east-bound line that originates at the Kazansky railway station in central Moscow (so-called "Kazansky direction"). This line, just like any other, is served by commuter electric trains.

Upon the station's opening in September 2016, the only way to transfer is to exit the "Andronovka" station and walk outside for 3-5 minutes, across the "Kazansky" line tracks. But the pedestrian underpass, and thus a more direct and convenient transfer is under construction.

== Gallery ==
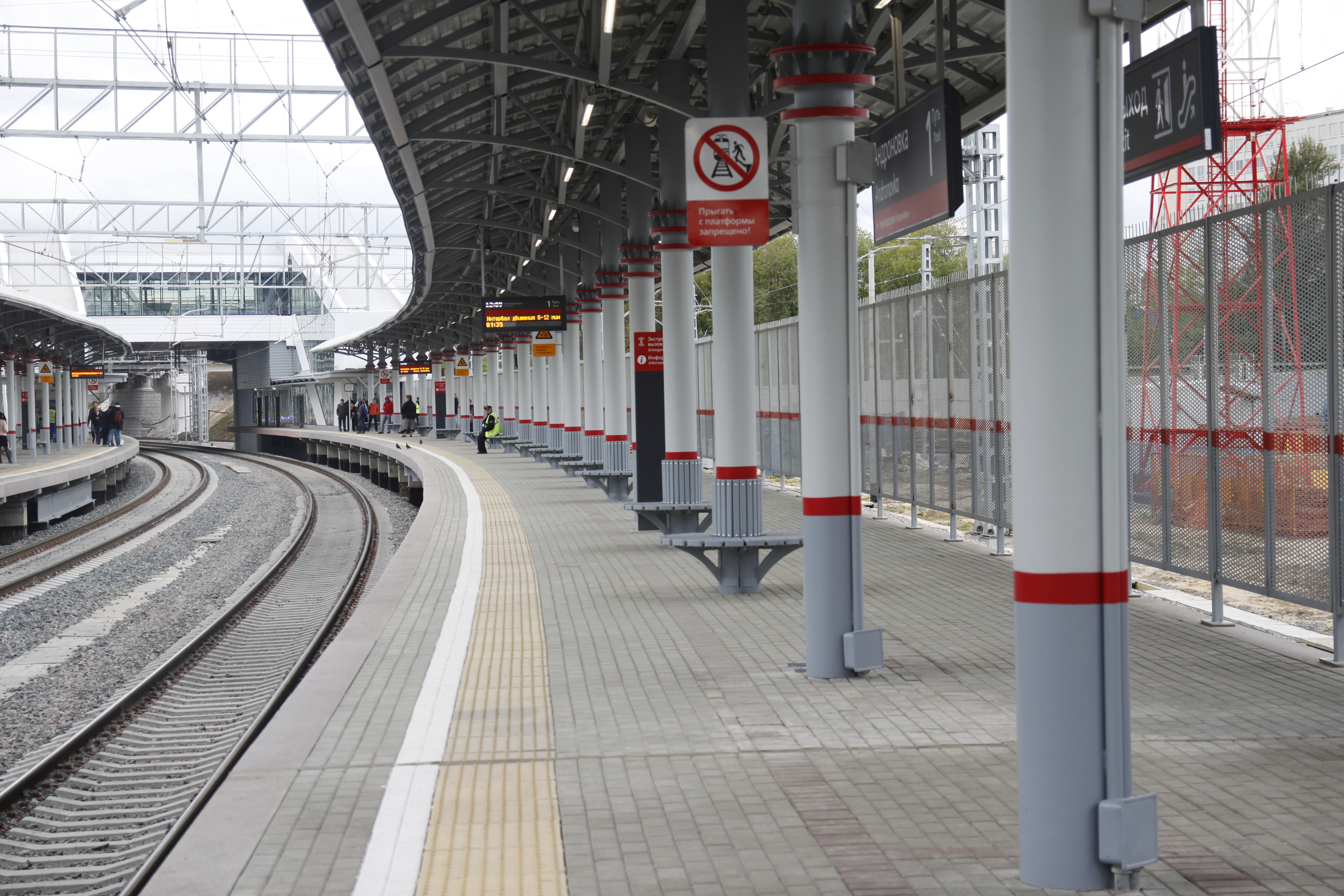

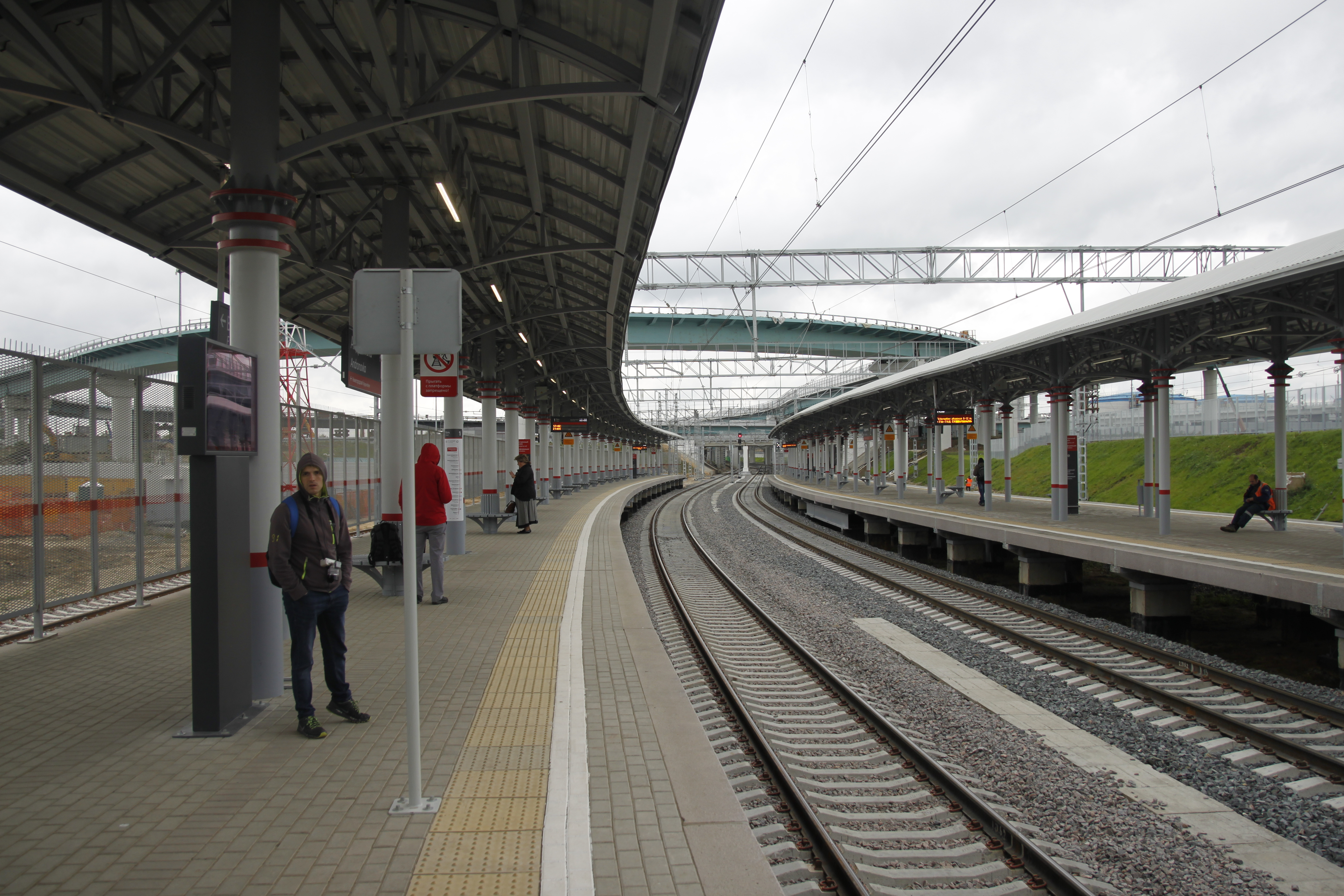

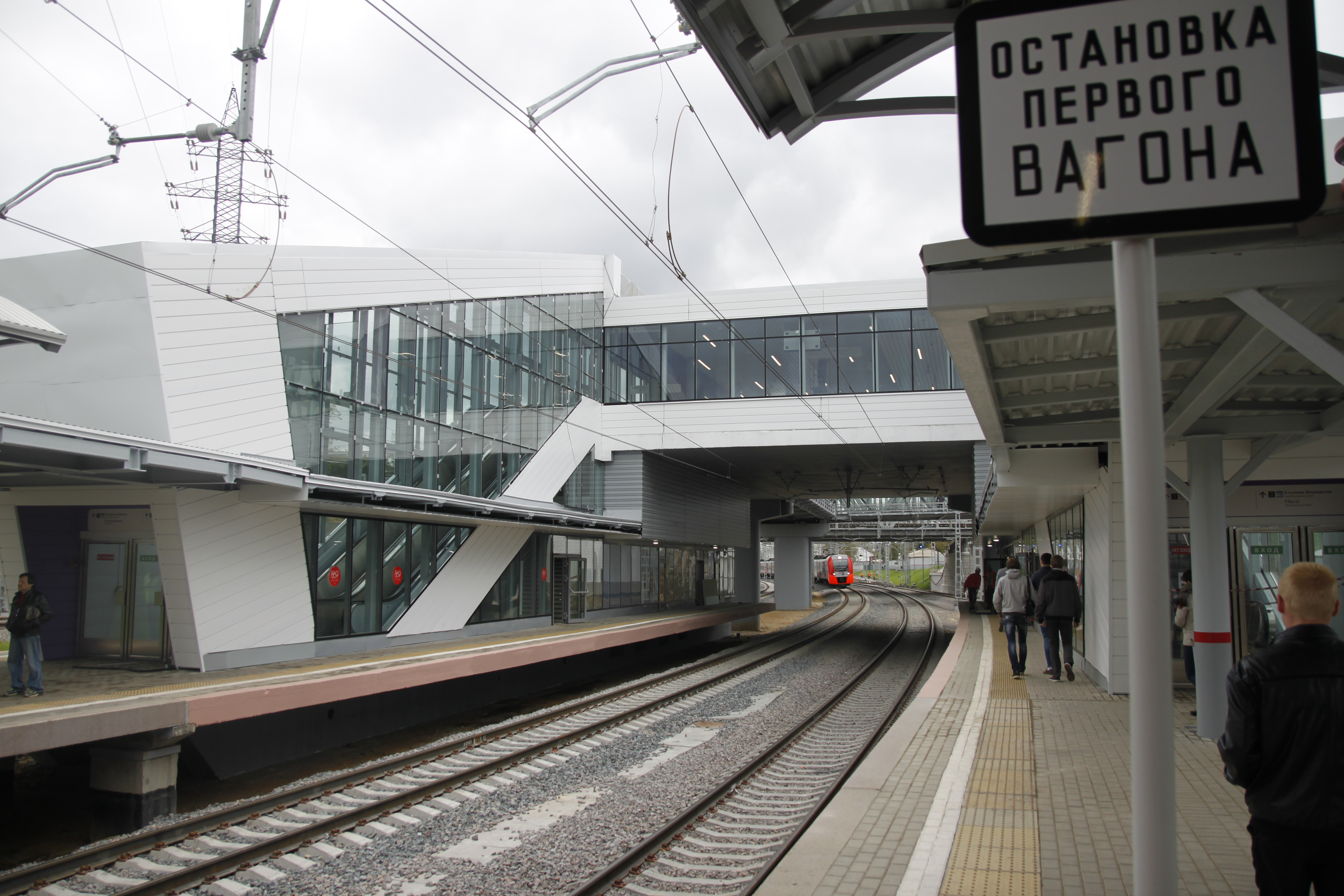

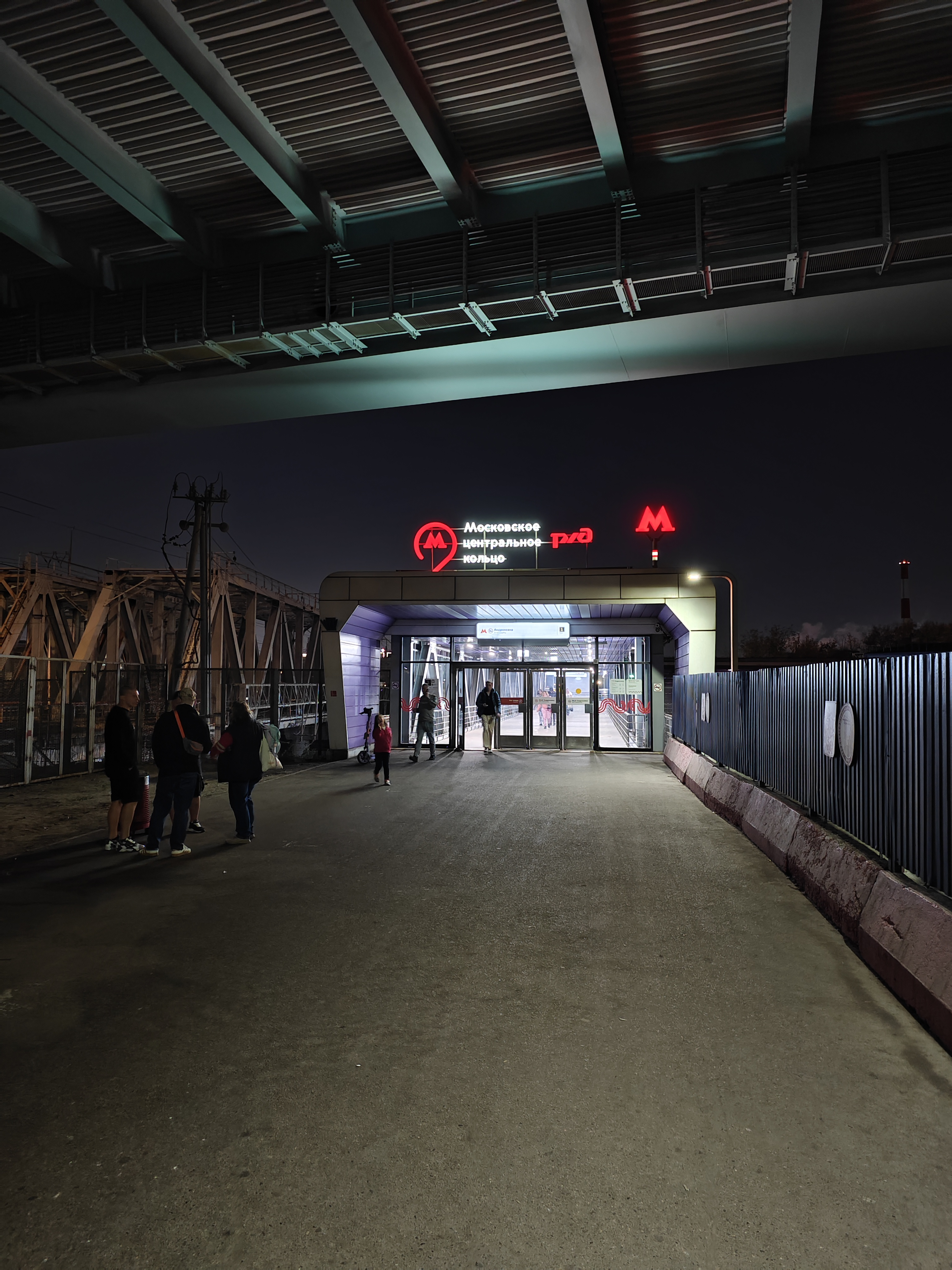

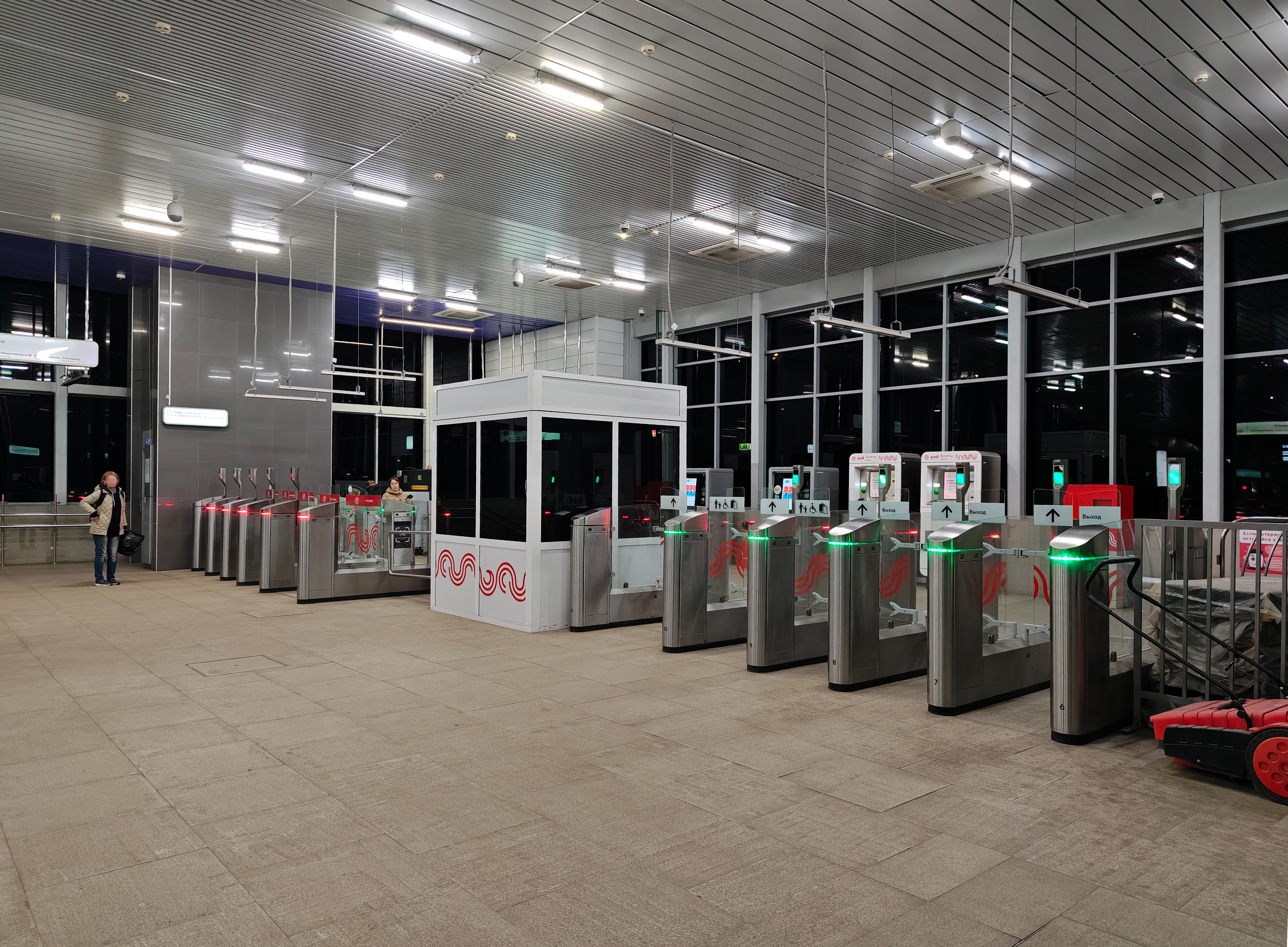

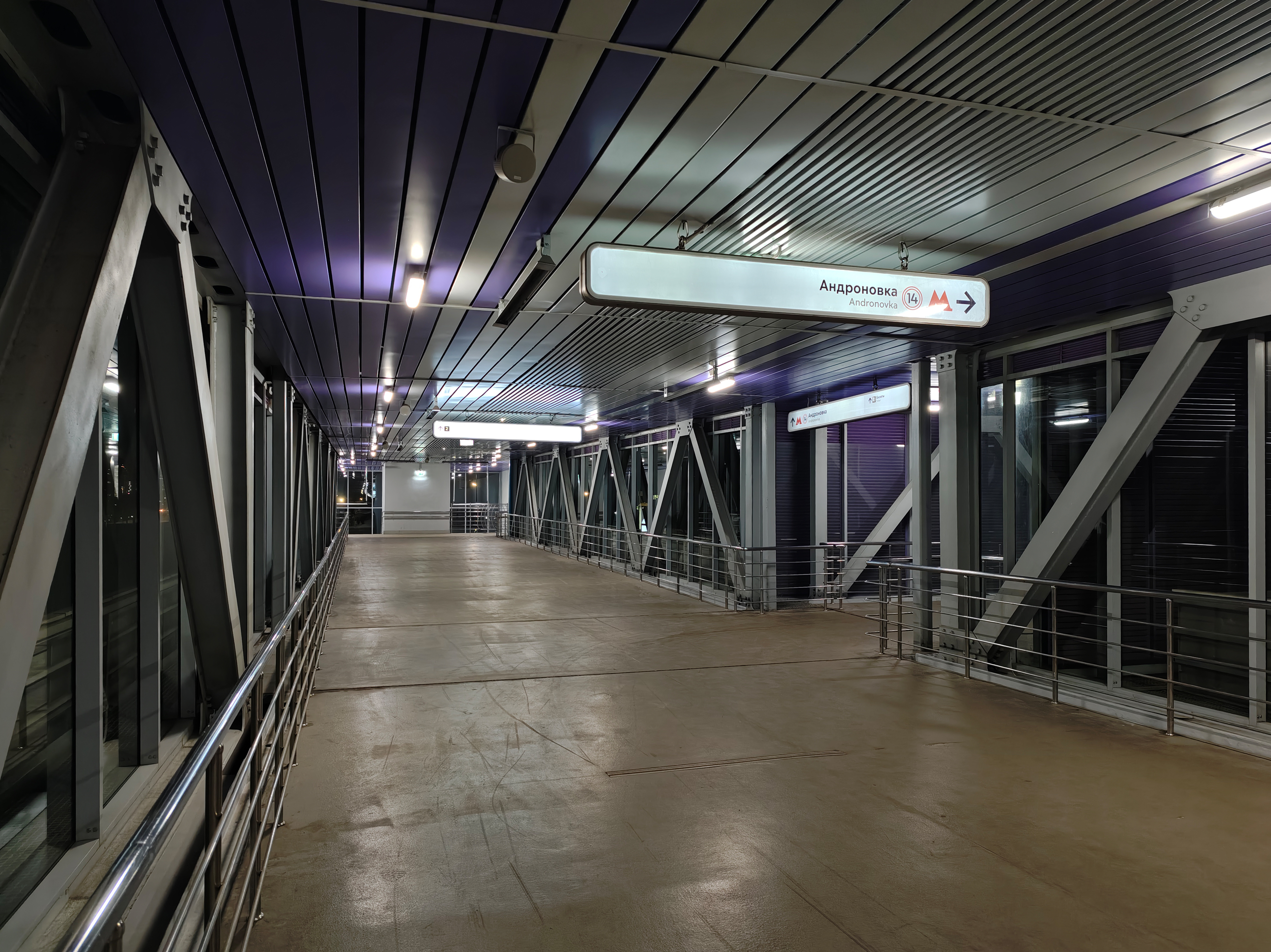
