= Aviamotornaya (Bolshaya Koltsevaya line) =

Moscow metro station

Aviamotornaya Авиамоторная
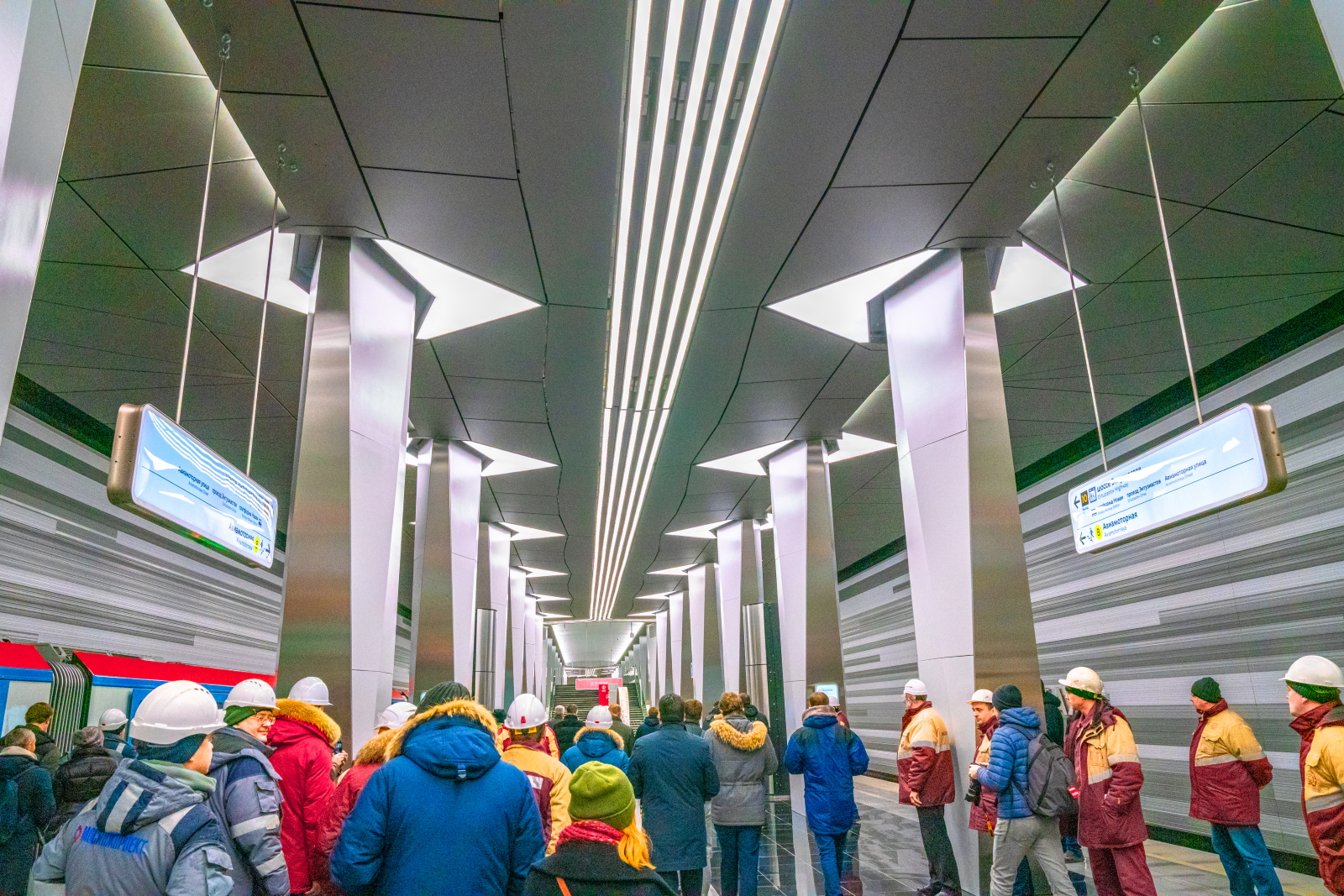

General information
- Location: Lefortovo District, South-Eastern Administrative Okrug; Moscow; Russia
- Coordinates: 55.753055°N 37.718611°E
- System: Moscow Metro station
- Owner: Moskovsky Metropoliten
- Line: Bolshaya Koltsevaya line
- Platforms: island platform
- Connections: Tram: 12, 24, 37, 38, 43, 46, 50

Construction
- Structure type: Three-span shallow-column station
- Platform levels: 1
- Parking: No

History
- Opened: 27 March 2020

Services
Preceding station	Moscow Metro	Following station
Lefortovo anticlockwise / outer	Bolshaya Koltsevaya line	Nizhegorodskaya clockwise / inner
Ploshchad Ilyicha towards Tretyakovskaya	Kalininsko-Solntsevskaya line (Kalininsky radius) transfer at Aviamotornaya	Shosse Entuziastov towards Novokosino
Route map
Bolshaya Koltsevaya line
Location
- Location within Moscow Metro

Aviamotornaya (Russian: Авиамоторная, lit. 'Aircraft engines') is a station on the Bolshaya Koltsevaya line of the Moscow Metro. The station was opened on 27 March 2020 as part of Nekrasovskaya line extension.

Similar to Aviamotornaya on the Kalininsko-Solntsevskaya line, the station's name comes from Aviamotornaya Ulitsa, which, in turn, is named for the Baranov Central Institute of Aviation Motor Development with a transfer point that opened on 30 December 2024.

== Construction ==
In July 2016, the Lefortovo market was cleared in order to begin construction on the station. Construction on the north lobby began in February 2017. Tunneling began in September 2017 starting with the left tunnel, followed by the right tunnel in October of that year.

== Layout ==
The station has two lobbies, one that exits to Aviamotornaya Ulitsa with a second at Proyezd Entuziastov. It is part of a transit hub that allows transfers to the existing Aviamotornaya station as well as the Novaya stop on the Kazanskoye branch of the Moscow Railway. In addition, there is a commercial component for vendors that previously had space in the now-demolished market.
