= Aviamotornaya (Kalininsko-Solntsevskaya line) =

Moscow Metro station

Aviamotornaya Авиамоторная
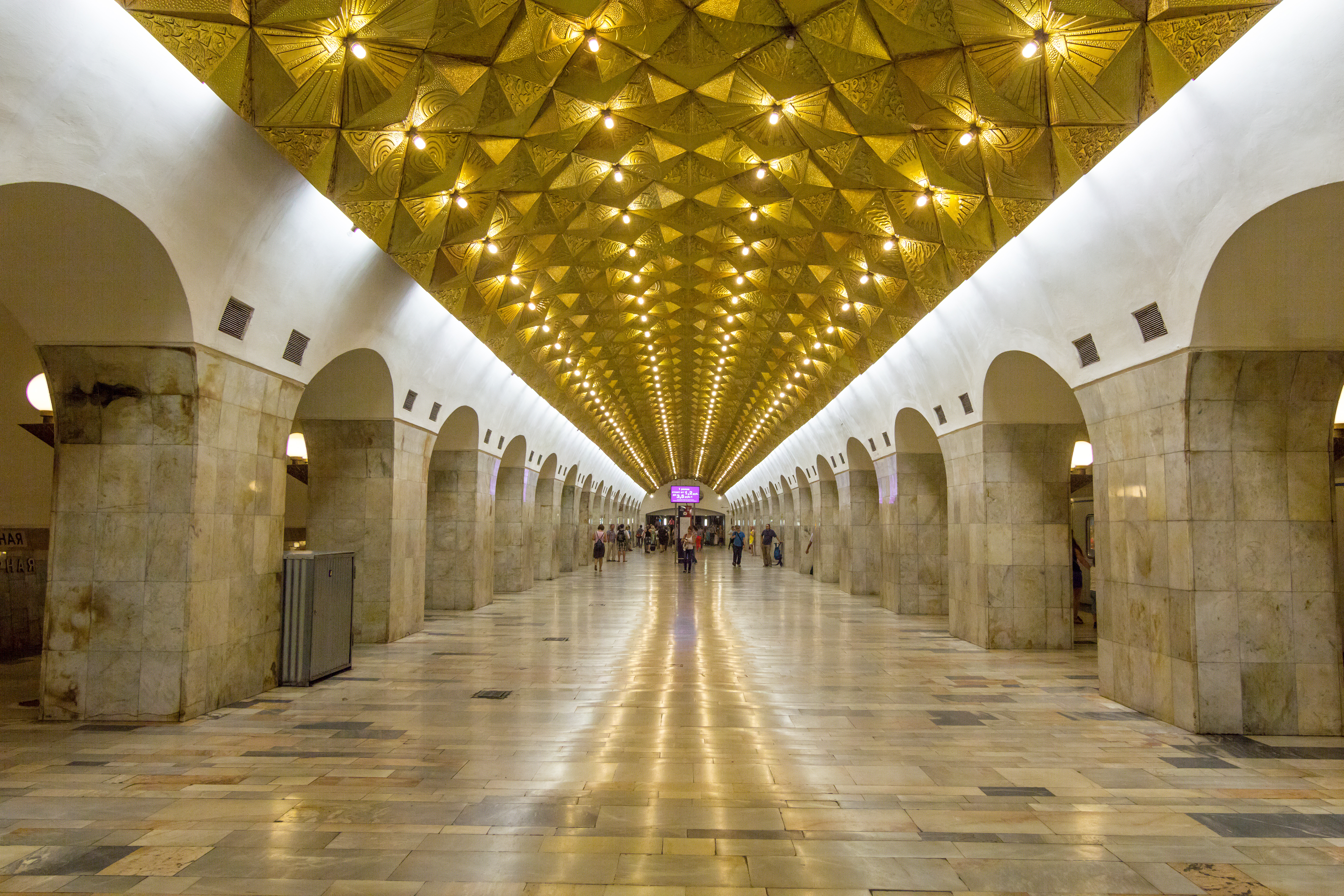

General information
- Location: Aviamotornaya Street; Lefortovo District; South-Eastern Administrative Okrug; Moscow; Russia
- Coordinates: 55.7524°N 37.7191°E
- System: Moscow Metro station
- Owner: Moskovsky Metropoliten
- Line: Kalininskaya line
- Connections: Bus: 59, 59k, 125, 730, 759, 805; Trolleybus: 24, 45, 53; Tram: 8, 12, 24, 32, 37, 46, 50

Construction
- Depth: 53 metres (174 ft)
- Parking: No

History
- Opened: 30 December 1979; 46 years ago

Services
Preceding station	Moscow Metro	Following station
Ploshchad Ilyicha towards Tretyakovskaya	Kalininsko-Solntsevskaya line (Kalininsky radius)	Shosse Entuziastov towards Novokosino
Lefortovo anticlockwise / outer	Bolshaya Koltsevaya line transfer at Aviamotornaya	Nizhegorodskaya clockwise / inner
Route map
Location
- Location within Moscow Metro

Aviamotornaya (Russian: Авиамото́рная, lit. 'Aircraft engines') is a Moscow Metro station in the Lefortovo District, South-Eastern Administrative Okrug, Moscow, Russia. It is on the Kalininsko-Solntsevskaya line. The station was opened on 30 December 1979.

The station is built in a three-vault configuration 53 metres (173 feet) underground. The central hallway contains a sculpture made out of anodised gold pyramids and tetrahedra. The architects of the station are A.F. Strelkov, V.I. Klokov, N.I. Demchinsky, J.A. Kolesnikov, and E.S. Barsky. The theme of Aviamotornaya is aviation and flying. The columns holding up the ceiling are glazed in a light marble tone. The floor is made up of granite plates coloured in different shades of grey. The wall at the end of the central hallway is faced in a metal sculpture depicting Icarus. There are decorations mentioning and detailing the main constellations.

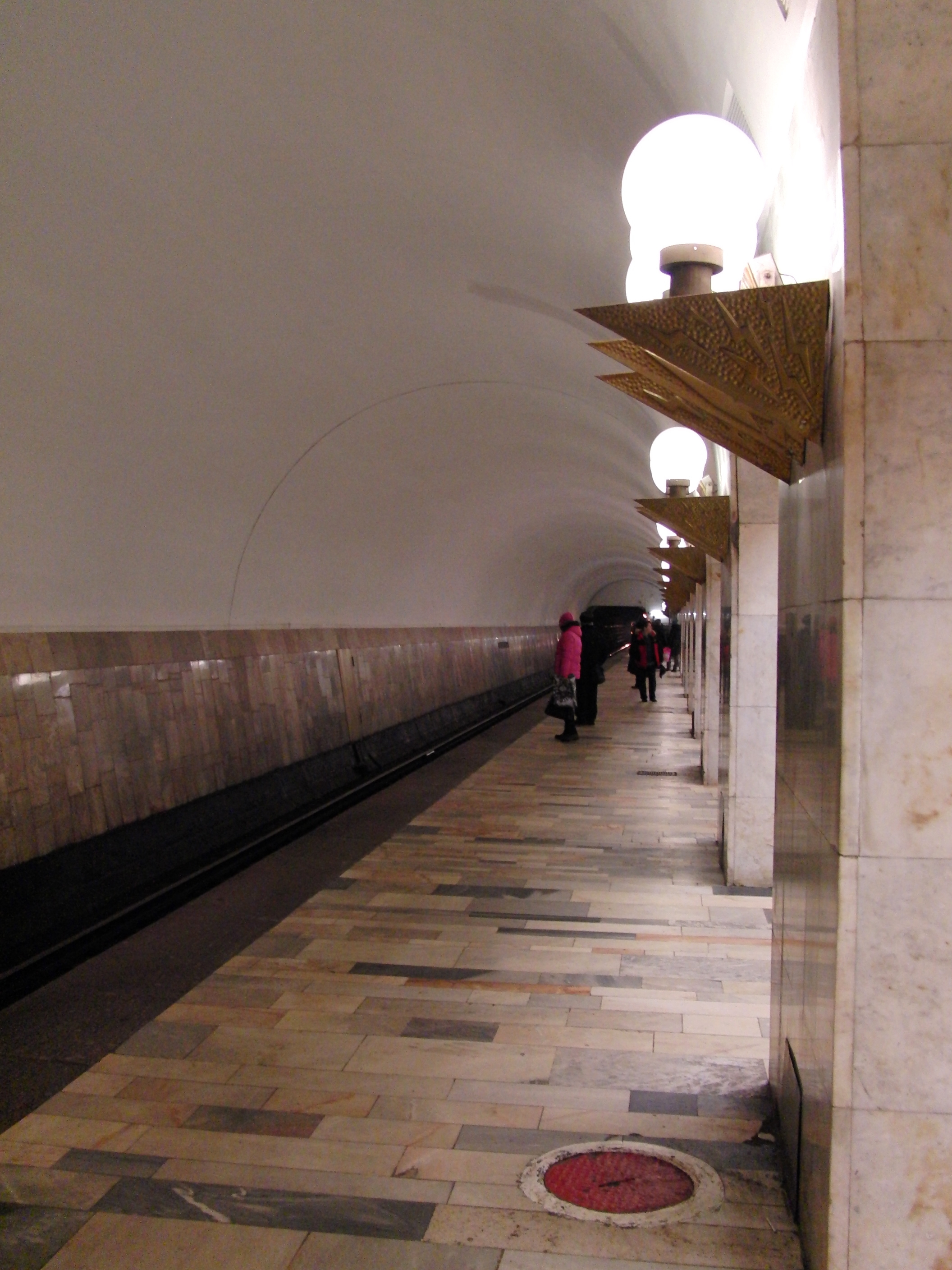
Station platform

A transfer to Aviamotornaya was opened on 30 December 2024.

== Escalator accident in 1982 ==
The escalators of the station caused a significant disaster on the Moscow Metro on February 17, 1982, that killed at least eight people.

As evening rush-hour approached, escalator #4 was turned on at 16:30 Moscow time. As the first commuters began to use it to descend, a poorly-attached step came loose, completing the cycle of coming all the way down and then back up on the opposite end of the chain. At 17:00, as it passed the upper mechanism, it got stuck and deformed the upper working gears and rods. This broke the clutch between the driving gears of the engine, and the thread, now free to move in any direction, began to accelerate from the weight of the passengers. Automatically the engine was immediately turned off and the brakes were applied. However, the standard working brakes lacked the strength to stop the momentum of the thread (heavily laden with passengers at this rush-hour), or even to reduce its acceleration.

For such a case, all escalators are equipped with additional emergency brakes, and Aviamotornaya's escalators had received completely new models three months prior. Moreover, two days before the accident, there had been a routine safety check, which found that the emergency brakes were incorrectly configured throughout; after necessary amendments, a simulation deemed all of the four escalators' emergency brakes to be satisfactory.

However, that was not the case. The chief mechanic in charge had used instructions for the old braking system to install the new brakes (which were being introduced on all escalators in the Metro at the time) on the particular escalator model at Aviamotornaya.

The resulting wrong configuration in both mechanism and circuitry did not allow for them to automatically turn on. Even when the escalator supervisor saw that the thread had accelerated to 2.4 times faster than its maximum rate and attempted to manually operate the brakes, nothing happened. 110 seconds after it began, the accident was over.

With the exception of a vague note in Vechernyaya Moskva, the state-controlled Soviet press made no reference to the event. This resulted in thousands of rumours and panic immediately spreading throughout the city. No person was actually sucked into the machine bay. All of the eight people who died were crushed at the base of the escalator by other passengers who did not have time to move away, forming an obstruction. Some did attempt to jump out of the way by climbing onto the balustrade, but the thin plastic coating could not withstand the weight and collapsed (thus the rumours), yet those who did fall through would have hit a solid concrete foundation with no moving parts of any sort a few metres under the balustrade, with most suffering minor injuries.

As the wounded were carried off, at 17:10 the station was put on exit only and at 17:35 closed altogether. Immediately an investigation was launched, where it was determined that the speedometer was wrongly wired to the emergency brake and that all of the three other escalators at the station were prone to similar disaster. After the accident, the Soviet medics counted 8 dead and 30 injured.
