= Lermontovsky Prospekt =

Moscow Metro station

Lermontovsky Prospekt Лермонтовский проспект
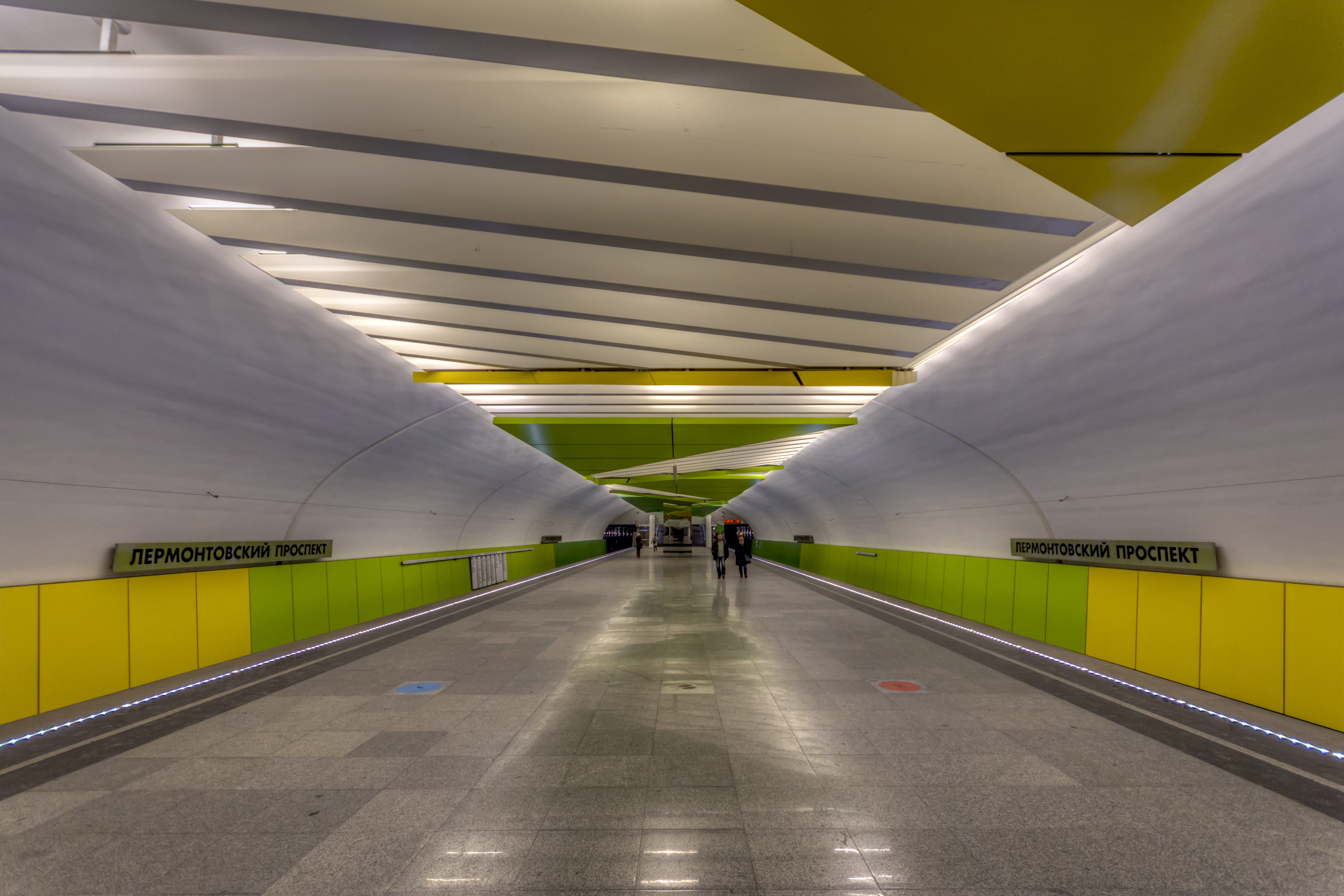
- Station platform in 2016

General information
- Location: Vykhino-Zhulebino District; South-Eastern Administrative Okrug; Moscow; Russia
- Coordinates: 55.7013°N 37.8525°E
- System: Moscow Metro station
- Owner: Moskovsky Metropoliten
- Line: Tagansko-Krasnopresnenskaya line
- Platforms: 1 island platform
- Tracks: 2

Construction
- Structure type: Shallow single-vault station
- Depth: 12 metres (39 ft)
- Platform levels: 1
- Parking: No
- Accessible: Yes

History
- Opened: 9 November 2013; 12 years ago

Services
| Preceding station | Moscow Metro | Following station |
|---|---|---|
| Vykhino towards Planernaya | Tagansko-Krasnopresnenskaya line | Zhulebino towards Kotelniki |
| Yugo-Vostochnaya towards Nizhegorodskaya | Nekrasovskaya line transfer at Kosino | Ulitsa Dmitriyevskogo towards Nekrasovka |
Route map
Location
- Location within Moscow Metro

Lermontovsky Prospekt (Russian: Лермонтовский проспект) is a station on Moscow Metro's Tagansko-Krasnopresnenskaya line. It is located between Vykhino and Zhulebino and opened, together with Zhulebino, on 9 November 2013. The station is constructed below the intersection of Khvalynsky Boulevard and Lermontovsky Avenue, hence the name of the station, and is located outside the Moscow Ring Road, approximately 500 metres (1,600 ft) from Kosino railway station. The construction of Lermontovsky Prospekt and Zhulebino was needed to unload Vykhino, which by the time of construction was the most crowded station of Moscow Metro.

Lermontovsky Prospekt is a shallow single-vault station. It is located below the central line of Lermontovsky Avenue, approximately from northwest to southeast. The station has five exits. Two of them are located at the northwestern side, at both sides of Lermontovsky Avenue, and three more at the southeastern side, at both sides of Khvalynsky Boulevard.

On 3 June 2019, the inaugural stretch of the Nekrasovskaya line was opened. Lermontovsky Prospekt was connected by a transfer to Kosino, the former west terminus of the line.

== Location ==
The territory at which the station currently located was until 1984 a part of the town of Lyubertsy of Moscow Oblast. In 1984 it was transferred to Moscow, and subsequently rapid urban development started. The whole area, along with Lyubertsy and other areas along the Kazansky and Ryazansky suburban directions of Moscow Railway were strongly dependent on the station of Vykhino, then the terminus of the Tagansko-Krasnopresnenskaya Line and a transfer station to both railway directions. In the 2000s, Vykhino was heavily overloaded. Eventually, the decision was taken to extend the Tagansko-Krasnopresnenskaya Line beyond Vykhino. The construction of the first stretch, with the stations of Lermontovsky Prospekt and Zhulebino, started in August 2011. The tunnels were completed by September 2013.
