= Nizhegorodskaya (Moscow Central Circle) =

Station on the Moscow Central Circle

Nizhegorodskaya Нижегородская
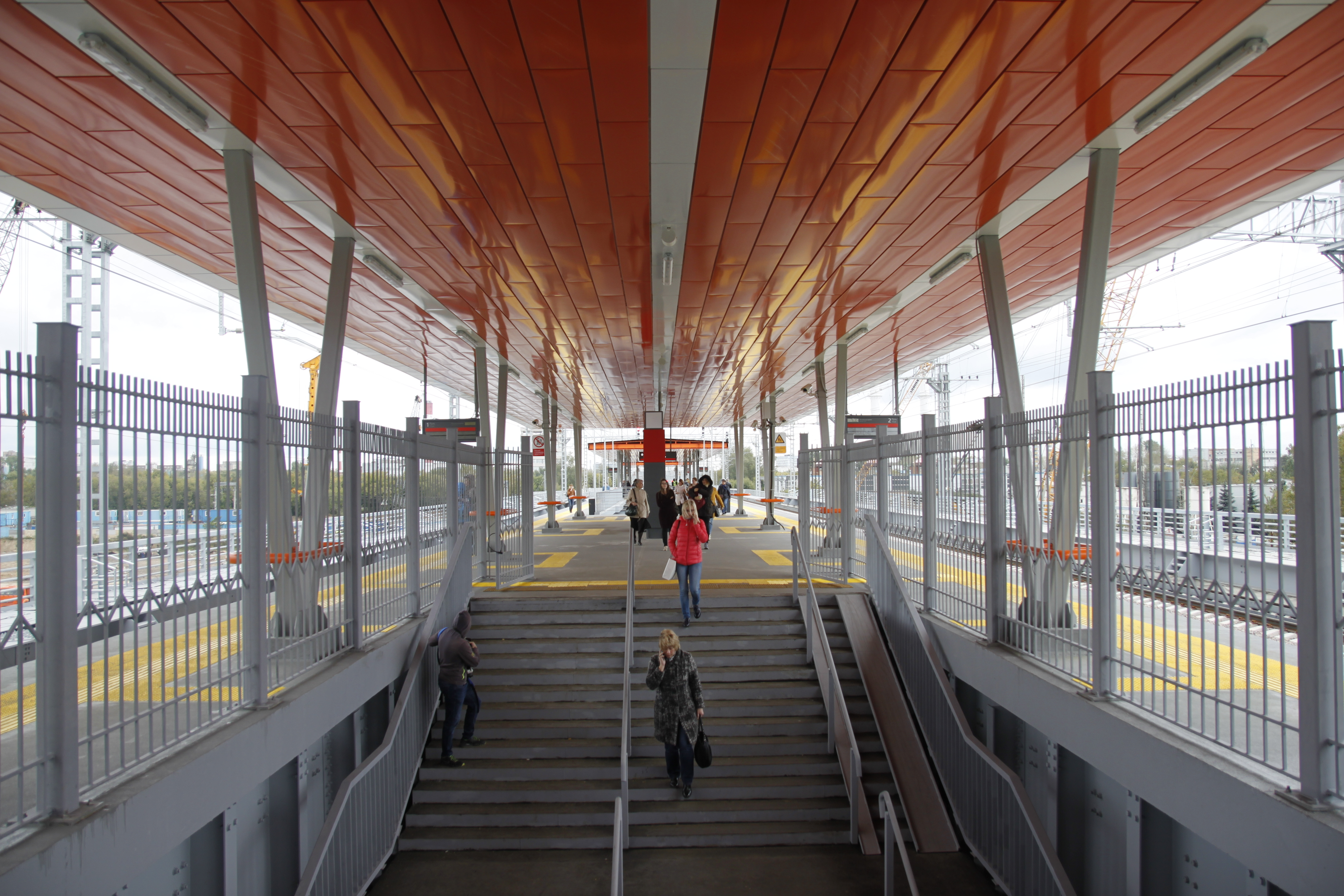

General information
- Coordinates: 55.7321°N 37.7281°E
- System: Moscow Metro
- Line: Moscow Central Circle
- Platforms: 1 island platform
- Tracks: 2

History
- Opened: 10 September 2016; 9 years ago

Services
Preceding station	Moscow Metro	Following station
Andronovka anticlockwise / outer	Moscow Central Circle	Novokhokhlovskaya clockwise / inner
Out-of-station interchange
Aviamotornaya anticlockwise / outer	Bolshaya Koltsevaya line transfer at Nizhegorodskaya	Tekstilshchiki clockwise / inner
Terminus	Nekrasovskaya line transfer at Nizhegorodskaya	Stakhanovskaya towards Nekrasovka
Route map
Location
- Location within Moscow Metro

Nizhegorodskaya (Russian: Нижегородская) is an elevated station on the Moscow Central Circle of the Moscow Metro that opened in September 2016. The station is named for the Nizhegorodsky District in Moscow. The named was changed prior to opening from Ryazanskaya.

Nizhegorodskaya is a part of an eponymous transport hub with transfer to the Gorkovsky suburban railway line (opened in January 2020) and the underground metro station of the Nekrasovskaya line (opened in March 2020). Connection to the underground Bolshaya Koltsevaya line is scheduled to open in 2022.

== Gallery ==
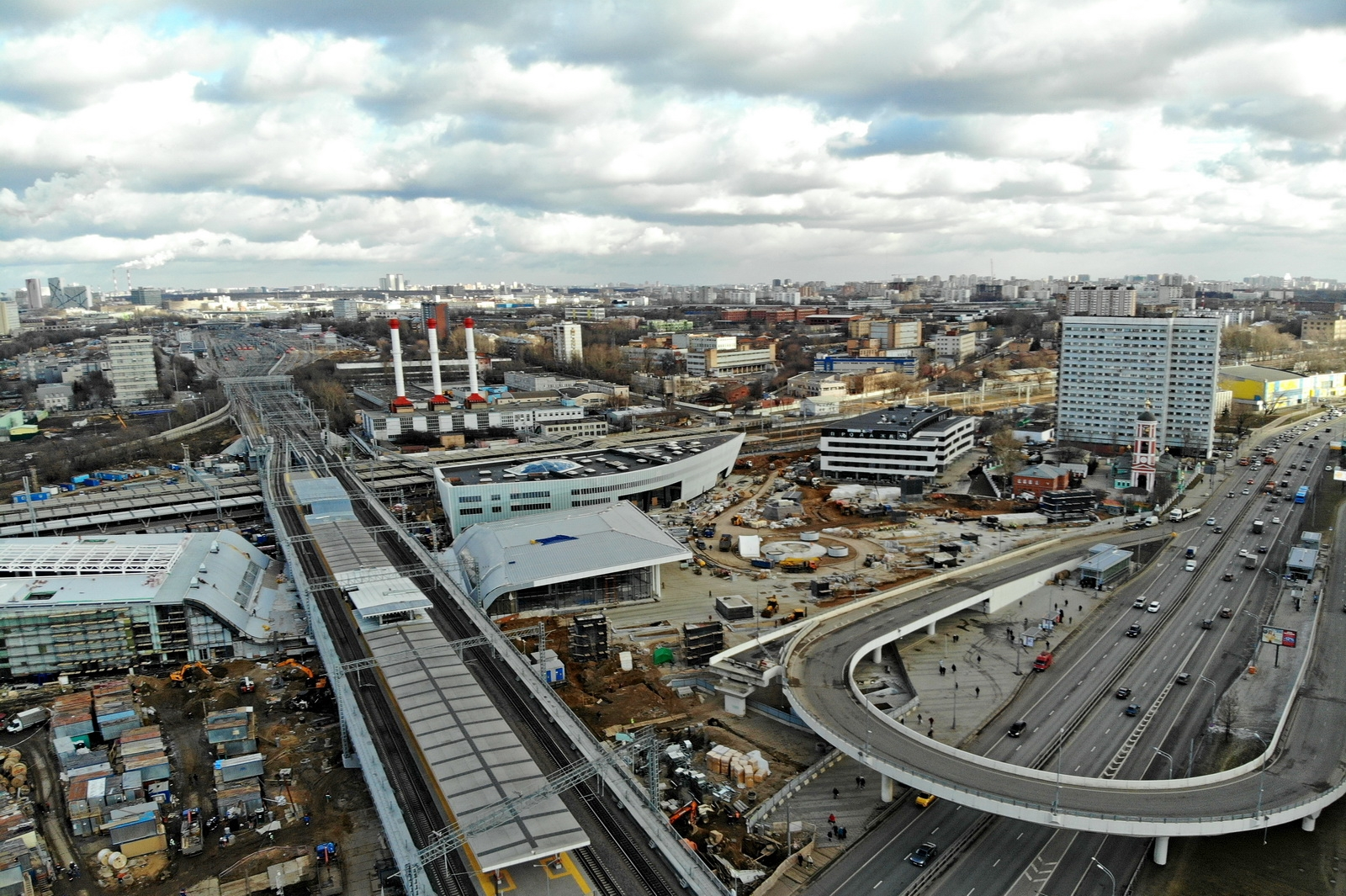

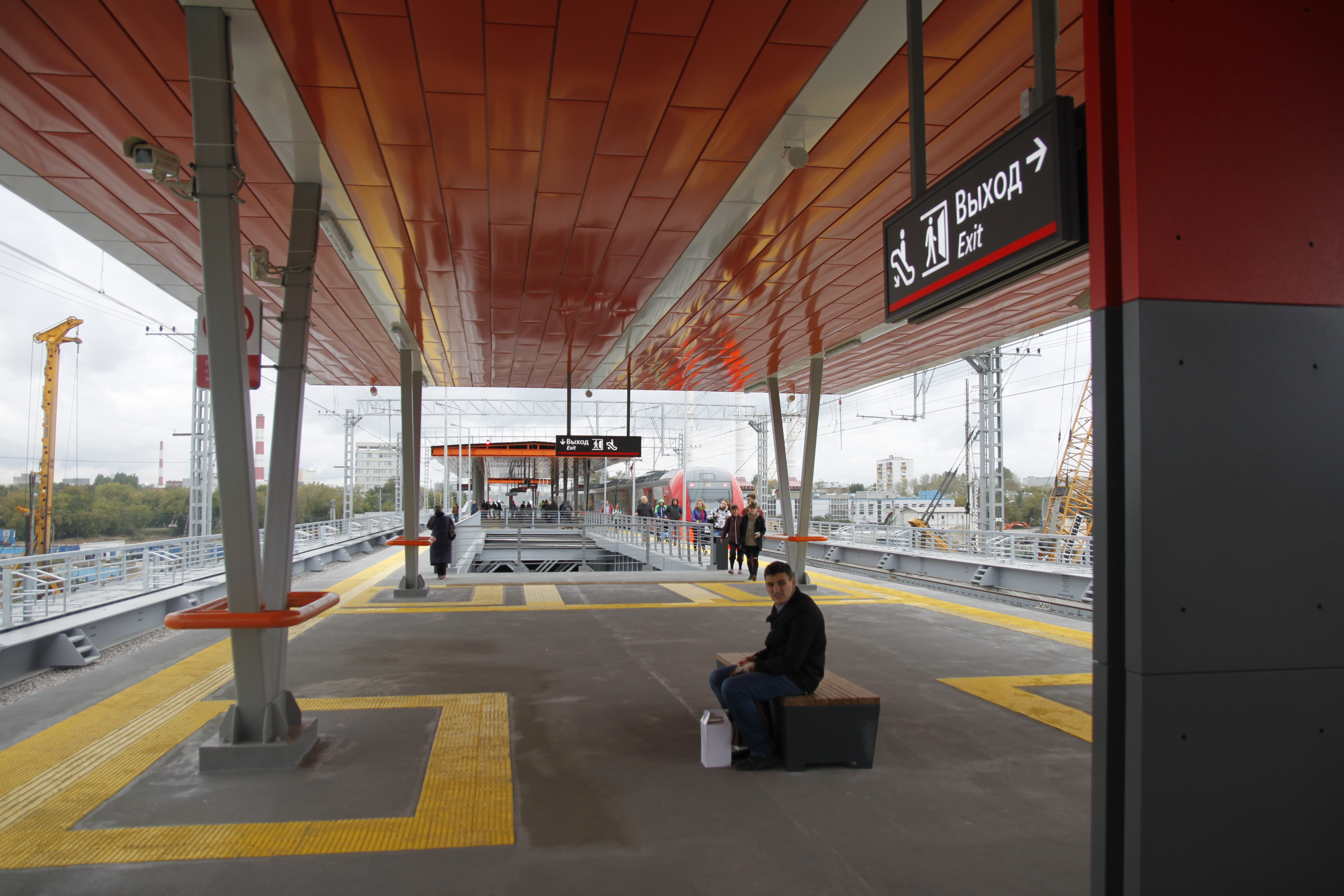
