= Okskaya =

Moscow Metro station

Okskaya Окская
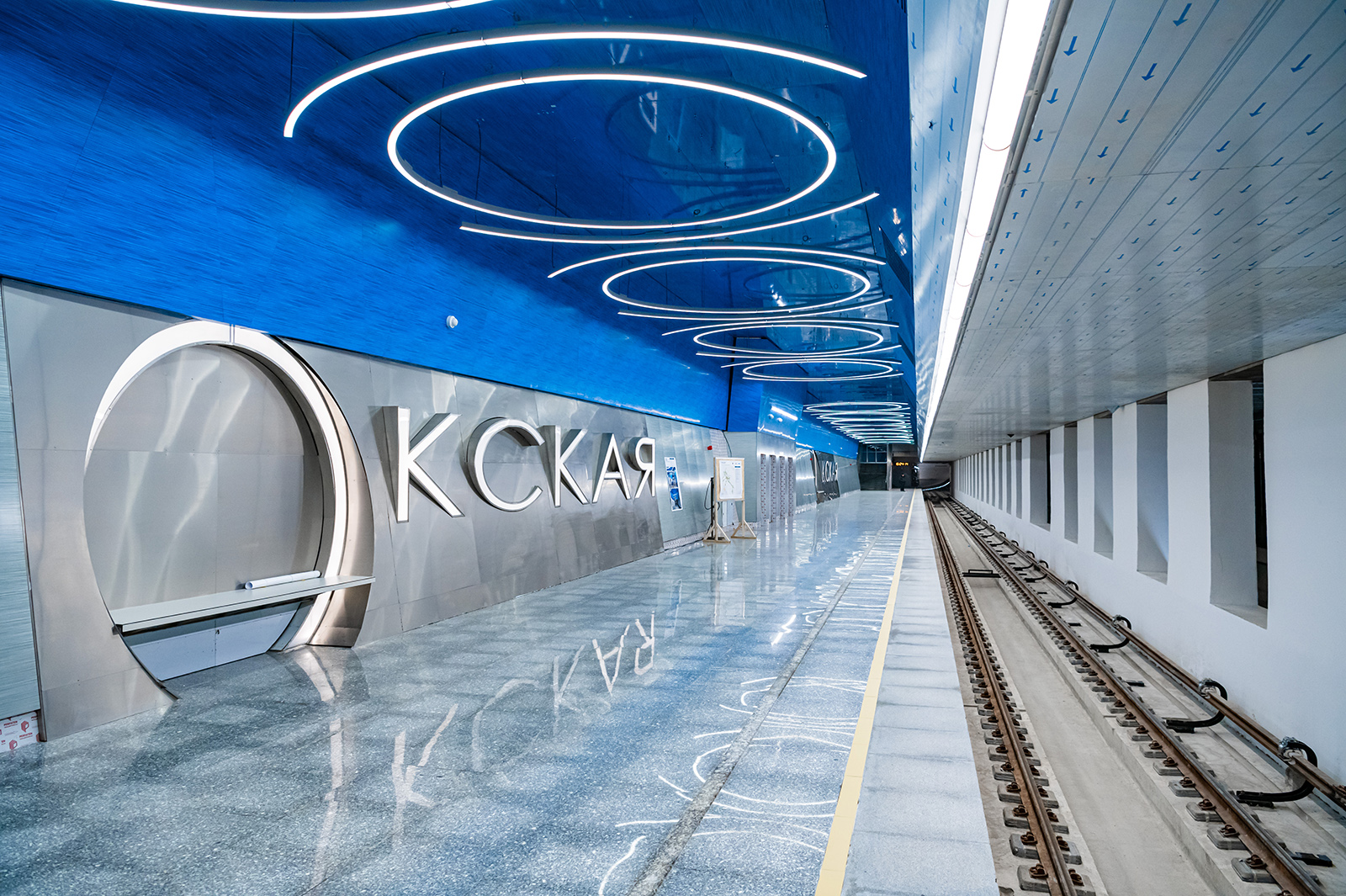

General information
- Location: Ryazansky District, South-Eastern Administrative Okrug; Moscow; Russia
- Coordinates: 55.718611°N 37.781666°E
- System: Moscow Metro station
- Owner: Moskovsky Metropoliten
- Line: Nekrasovskaya line
- Platforms: 2 side platforms

Construction
- Structure type: Three-span shallow-column station
- Depth: 20 metres (66 ft)
- Platform levels: 1
- Parking: No

History
- Opened: 27 March 2020

Services
Preceding station	Moscow Metro	Following station
Stakhanovskaya towards Nizhegorodskaya	Nekrasovskaya line	Yugo-Vostochnaya towards Nekrasovka
Route map
Nekrasovskaya line
Location
- Location within Moscow Metro

Okskaya (Russian: Окская) is a station on the Nekrasovskaya line of the Moscow Metro. The station was opened on 27 March 2020.

== Name ==
The station is named for the street on which it is situated. Okskaya Street in turn is named for the Oka River, a tributary of the Volga River.
