= Moskwa (disambiguation) =

Moskwa is a Polish punk-rock band.

Moskwa may also refer to:

- Moskwa, Łódź Voivodeship, a village in Poland
- Moskwa (surname)

== See also ==
- Moskva (disambiguation)
