= Moskva (inhabited locality) =

Moskva (Russian: Москва) is the name of several rural localities in Russia:

- Moskva, Kirov Oblast, a village under the administrative jurisdiction of Verkhoshizhemye Urban-Type Settlement in Verkhoshizhemsky District of Kirov Oblast; 57°58′N 49°7′E
- Moskva, Pskov Oblast, a village in Porkhovsky District of Pskov Oblast
- Moskva, Tver Oblast, a village in Voroshilovskoye Rural Settlement of Penovsky District in Tver Oblast

== See also ==
- Moscow (Russian: Москва, romanized: Moskva, lit. 'Moscow'), the capital of Russia
- Moskva (disambiguation) for other uses
