= Lukhmanovskaya =

Moscow Metro station

Lukhmanovskaya Лухмановская
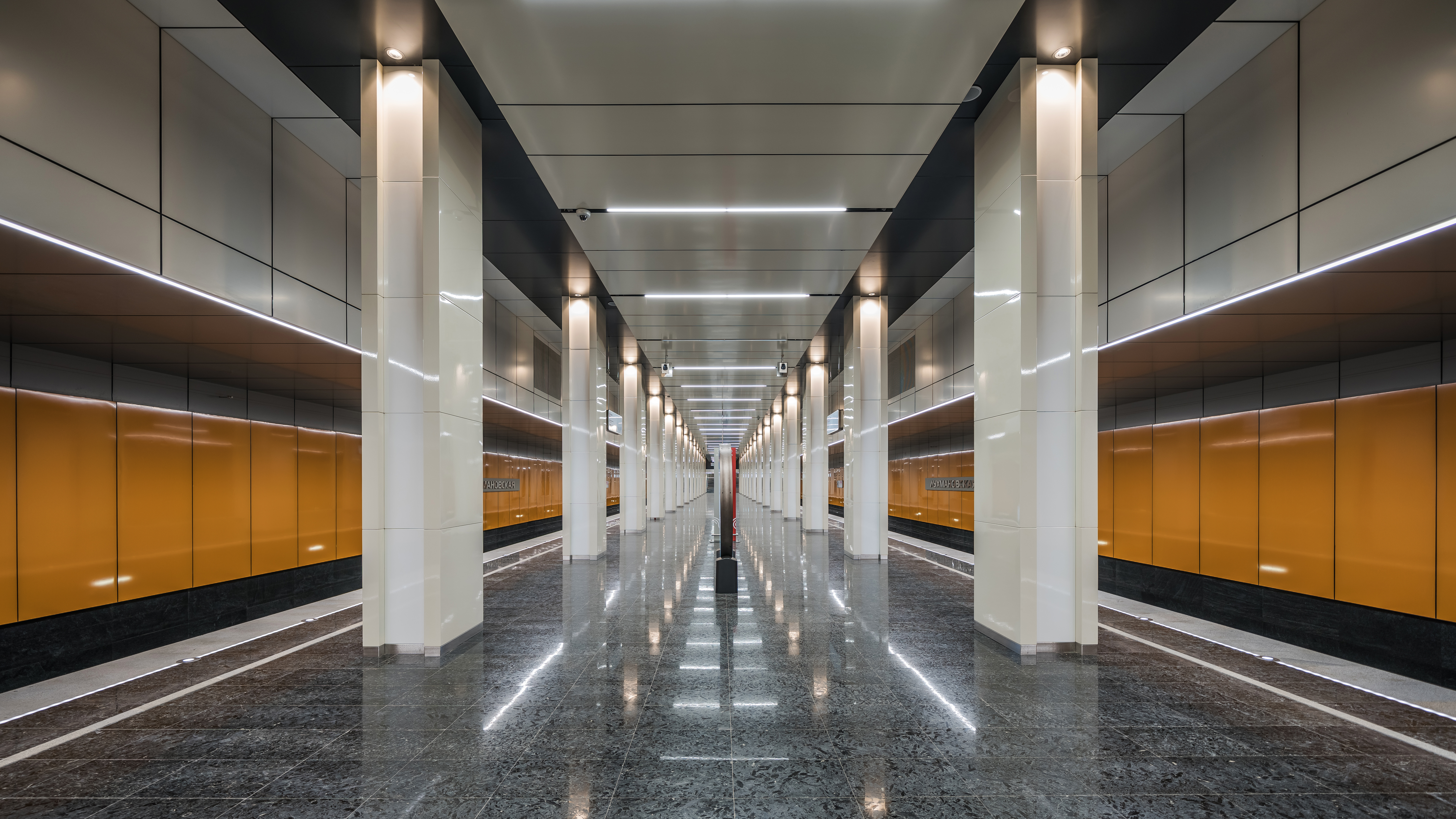

General information
- Location: Kosino-Ukhtomsky District, Eastern Administrative Okrug; Moscow; Russia
- Coordinates: 55.7085°N 37.9004°E
- System: Moscow Metro station
- Owner: Moskovsky Metropoliten
- Line: Nekrasovskaya line
- Platforms: 1 island platform

Construction
- Structure type: Three-span shallow-column station
- Platform levels: 1
- Parking: No

History
- Opened: 3 June 2019

Services
Preceding station	Moscow Metro	Following station
Ulitsa Dmitriyevskogo towards Nizhegorodskaya	Nekrasovskaya line	Nekrasovka Terminus
Route map
Nekrasovskaya line
Location
- Location within Moscow Metro

Lukhmanovskaya (Russian: Лухмановская) is a station on the Nekrasovskaya line of the Moscow Metro. It was opened on 3 June 2019 as a part of the inaugural stretch of the line, between Kosino and Nekrasovka.

== Name ==
The station name was originally planned as Kosino-Ukhtomsky, after the Kosino-Ukhtomsky District in Moscow. In 2014, the municipal committee responsible for naming public buildings decided on Lyuberetsky. In February, the Mayor of Moscow, Sergey Sobyanin, issued a decree to name the station Lukhmanovskaya. The name comes from Lukhmanovskaya Street, which in turn, is named for Dmitry Lukhmanov, a 19th-century Russian merchant.
