= Ulitsa Dmitriyevskogo =

Moscow Metro station

Ulitsa Dmitriyevskogo Улица Дмитриевского
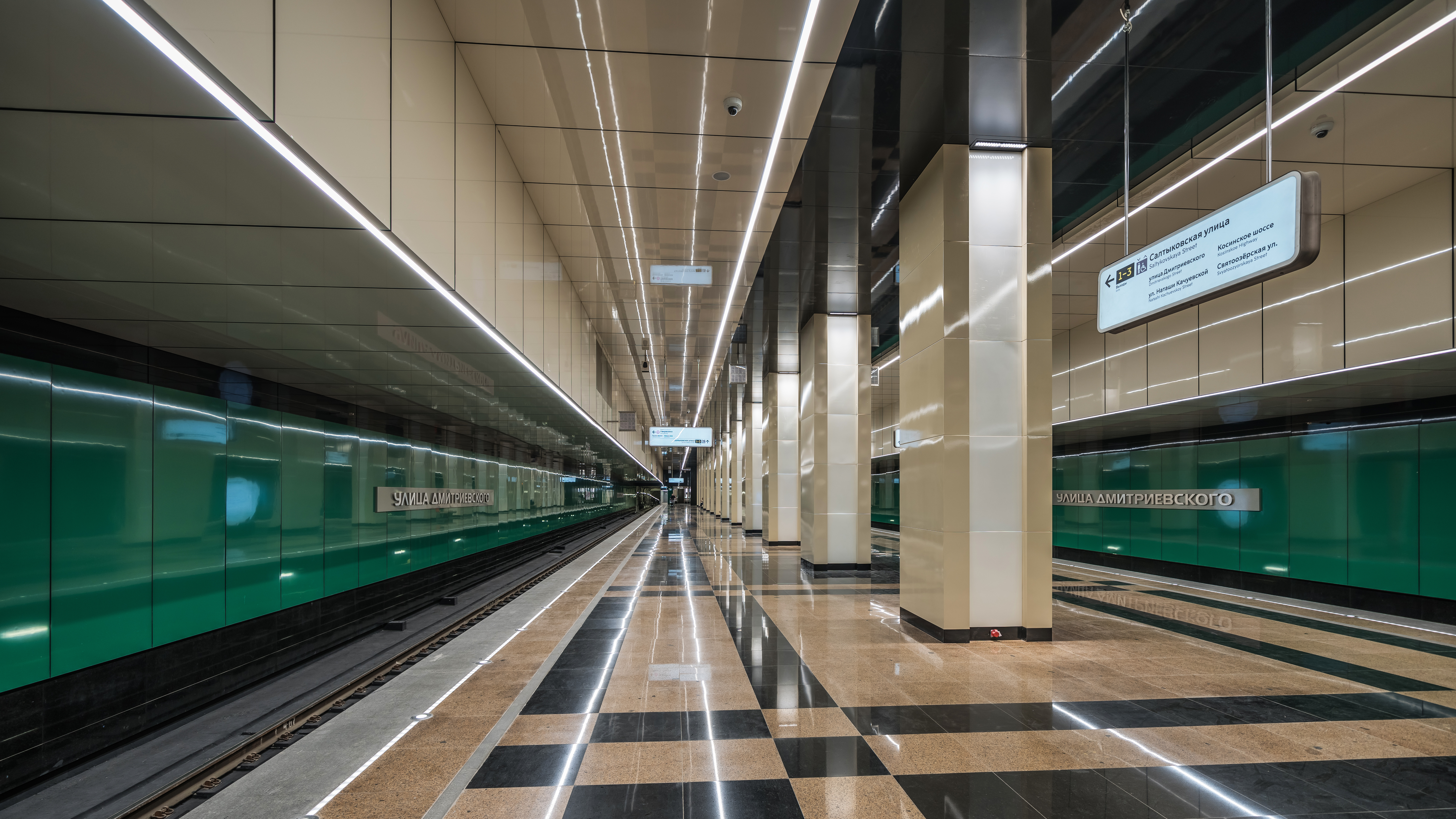

General information
- Location: Kosino-Ukhtomsky District, Eastern Administrative Okrug; Moscow; Russia
- Coordinates: 55.710000°N 37.879166°E
- System: Moscow Metro station
- Owner: Moskovsky Metropoliten
- Line: Nekrasovskaya line
- Platforms: 1 island platform

Construction
- Structure type: Two-span shallow-column station
- Platform levels: 1
- Parking: No

History
- Opened: 3 June 2019

Services
Preceding station	Moscow Metro	Following station
Kosino towards Nizhegorodskaya	Nekrasovskaya line	Lukhmanovskaya towards Nekrasovka
Route map
Nekrasovskaya line
Location
- Location within Moscow Metro

Ulitsa Dmitrievskogo (Russian: Улица Дмитриевского) is a station on the Nekrasovskaya line of the Moscow Metro. It was opened on 3 June 2019 as a part of the inaugural stretch of the line, between Kosino and Nekrasovka.

In the initial stages of development, the projected name of the station was Saltykovskaya Street. In September 2014, the committee responsible for naming municipal buildings established the name as Ulitsa Dmitrievskogo. The station's namesake street was named for First Lieutenant Boris Dmitriyevsky, who was named a Hero of the Soviet Union for his actions in World War II.
