= 81-765 series =

Class of Russian metro cars

81-765/766/767
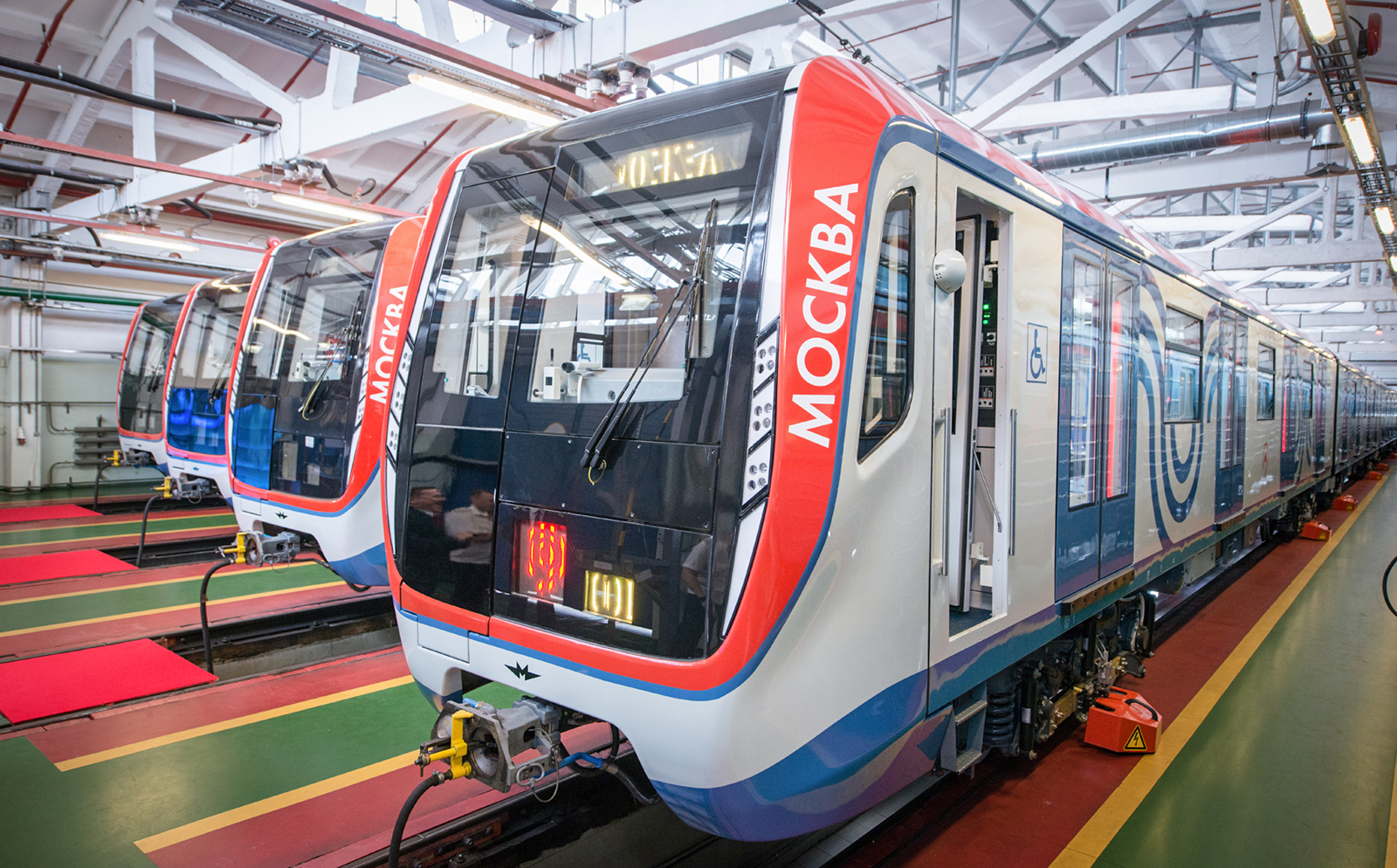
- Moskva

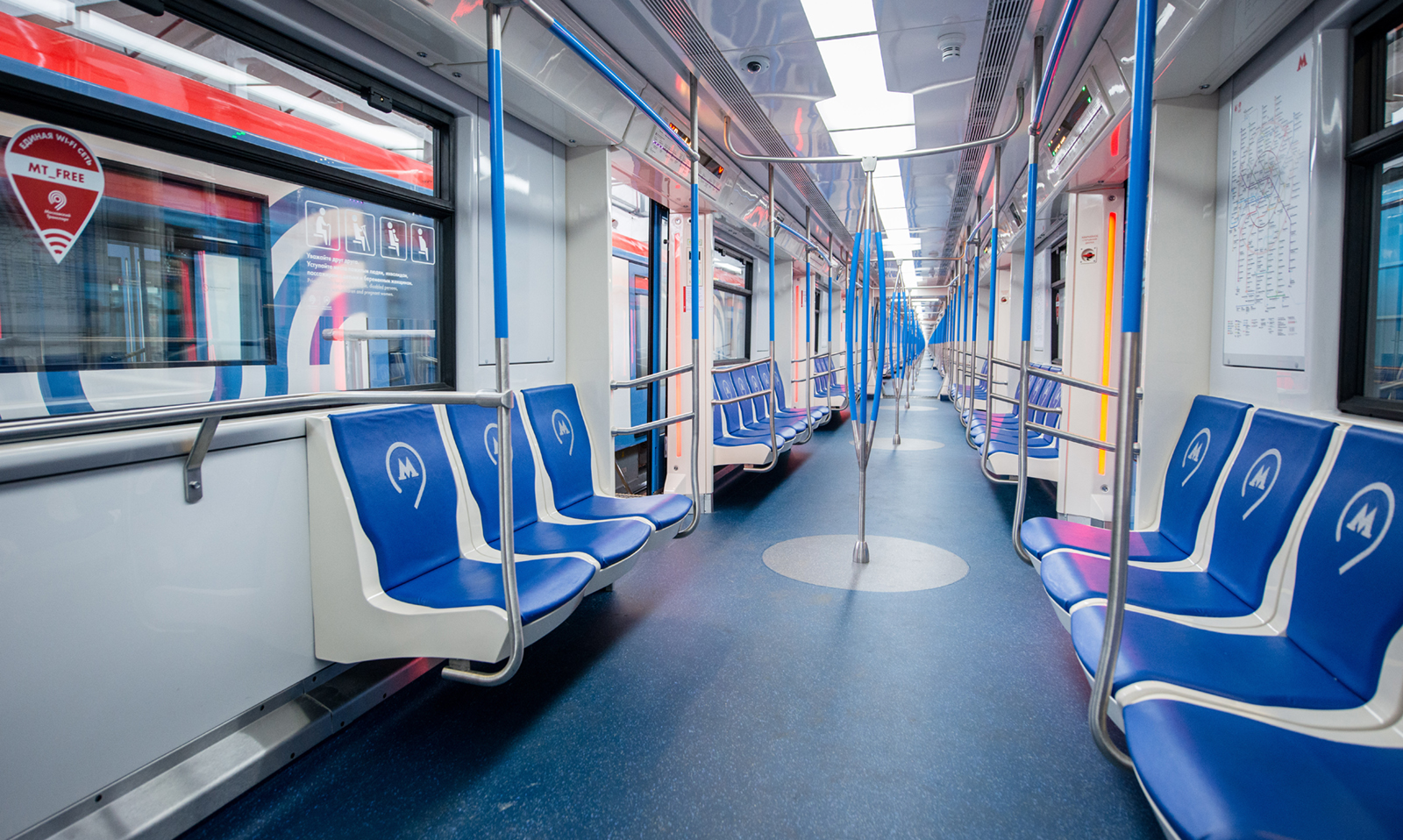
- In service: 2017–present
- Manufacturer: Transmashholding
- Built at: Metrowagonmash
- Replaced: 81-717 series 81-740 series
- Constructed: 2016–present
- Entered service: 2017
- Number built: 244 trainsets (1750 cars)
- Predecessor: 81-760 series
- Successor: 81-775 series
- Formation: 2 — 8 cars
- Operators: Moscow Metro; Kazan Metro; Baku Metro; Tashkent Metro
- Lines served: See list: Moscow Metro; Sokolnicheskaya line; Filyovskaya line; Kaluzhsko-Rizhskaya line; Tagansko-Krasnopresnenskaya line; Nekrasovskaya line; Kazan Metro; Line 1; Baku Metro; Red line; Green line; Tashkent Metro; Yunusobod Line

Specifications
- Car body construction: stainless steel
- Train length: 155.08 m (508 ft 9 1/2 in) (8-car trainset)
- Car length: 81-765 - 20.12 m (66 ft 1/8 in) 81-766/767 - 19.14 m (62 ft 9 1/2 in)
- Width: 2.69 m (8 ft 9 7/8 in)
- Height: 3.68 m (12 ft 7/8 in)
- Floor height: 1.16 m (3 ft 9 5/8 in)
- Doors: 4 pairs per car
- Maximum speed: 90 km/h (56 mph)
- Weight: 81-765 - 38 t (37 long tons; 42 short tons) 81-766 - 36 t (35 long tons; 40 short tons) 81-767 - 29 t (29 long tons; 32 short tons)
- Traction system: Metrowagonmash KATP-3 2-level IGBT-VVVF
- Traction motors: asynchronous motor, TME 43-23-4
- Power output: 4x 170 kW (230 hp) (4,080 kW (5,470 hp) for 8-car trainset)
- Acceleration: 1.3 m/s^{2} (4.3 ft/s^{2})
- Deceleration: 1.1 m/s^{2} (3.6 ft/s^{2})
- Electric system: 750 V DC (mean)
- Current collection: third rail
- Braking systems: Dynamic brakes (rheostatic and regenerative), electro-pneumatic
- Safety systems: SKIF-M, ALS-ARS (ATS-ASR)
- Track gauge: 1,520 mm (4 ft 11 27/32 in) Russian gauge

81-765 series (named Moskva, Russian: Москва́) are types of metro cars designed by Metrowagonmash in Russia. The series consists of three types of cars: 81-765 (head motor car), 81-766 (intermediate motor car) and 81-767 (intermediate non-motor car). The Moskva is currently in service on five systems, including the Moscow Metro, Kazan Metro, Baku Metro, Tashkent Metro and Minsk Metro. It was also the basis for the 81-725 series, which is used on the Saint Petersburg Metro. The Moskva entered production in 2016 and entered service in the Moscow Metro in 2017. In Belarus, it is named the Minsk-2024.

== 81-765.2 ==
81-765.2 series is a first modification designed for open surface metro lines in 2018. Changes included seating configuration, door buttons, upgraded climate control and clothed seats.

== 81-765.3 ==
81-765.3 series is a second modification based on base type and designed for open surface metro lines in 2018.

== 81-765.4 ==
81-765.4 series (named Moskva-2019) is a facelift/modification from 2019. Changes included upgraded interior and breaking system allowing to breaking without pneumatic breaks till full stop.
81-765.4K is a modification for Kazan Metro.

== 81-765.B ==
81-765.B series is a modification for Baku Metro.

== 81-765.5 ==
81-765.5 series is a modification for Tashkent Metro.

== 81-765.7 ==
81-765.7 series (named Minsk 2024) is a modification for Minsk Metro.

== Gallery ==
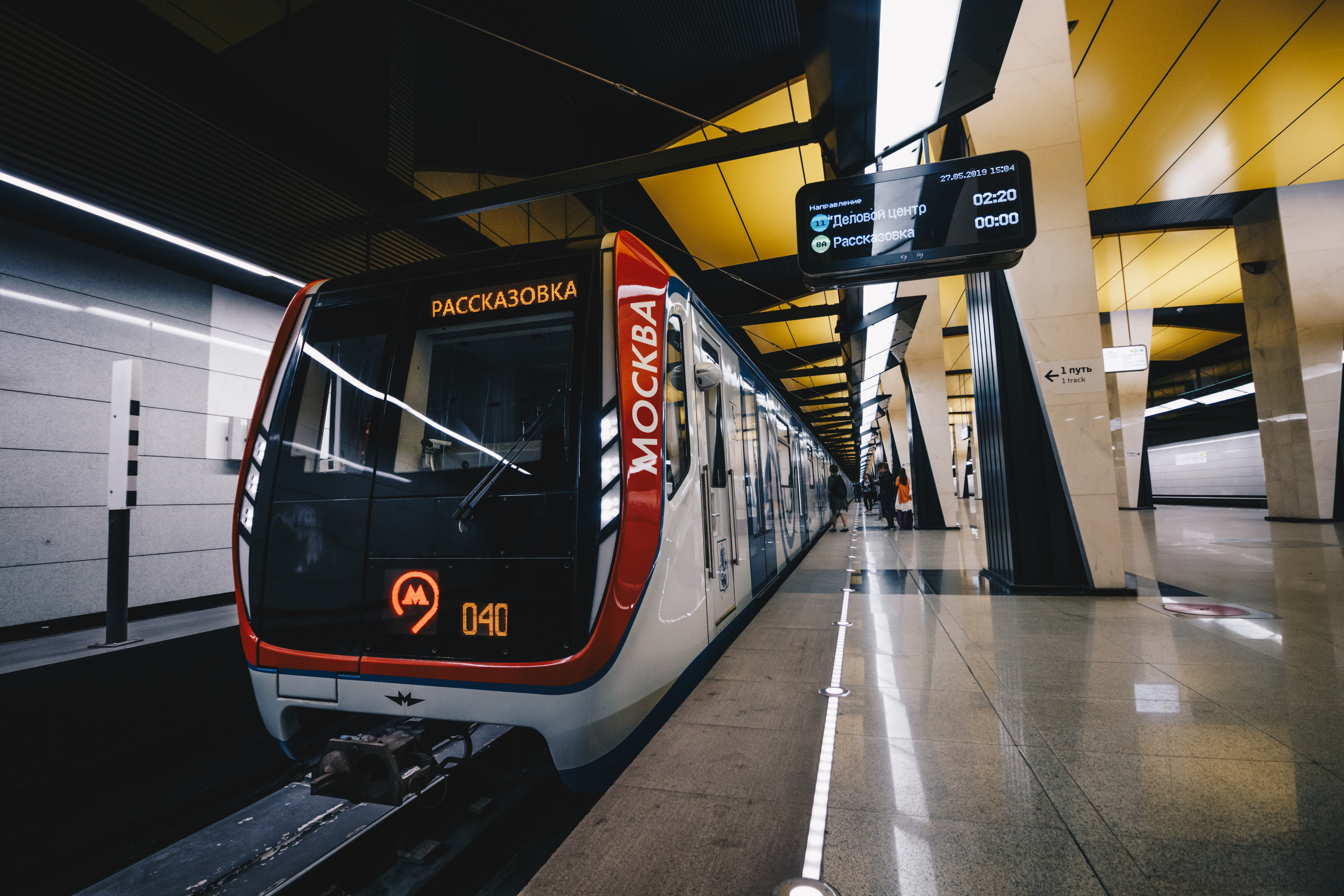
base type

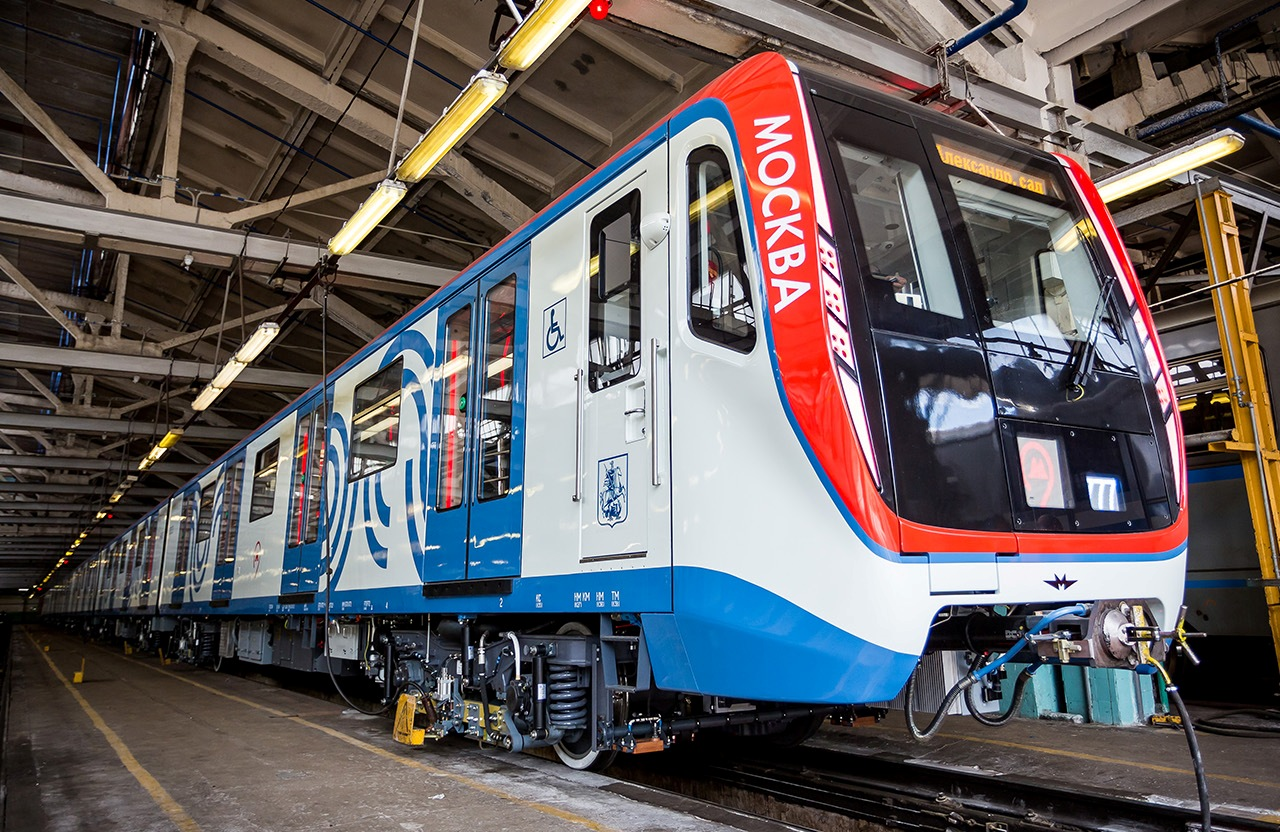
.2 modification

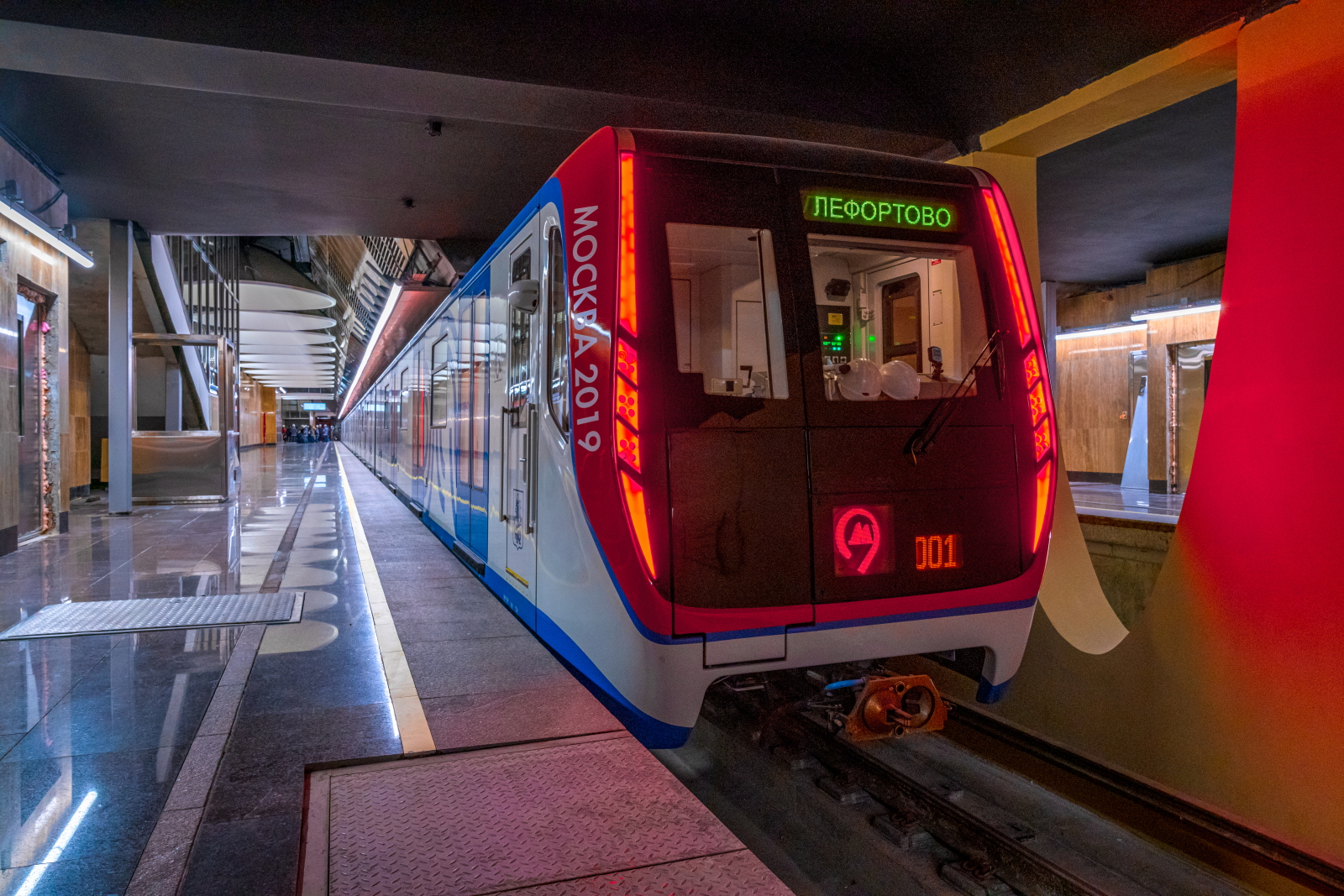
Moskva-2019 (.4)

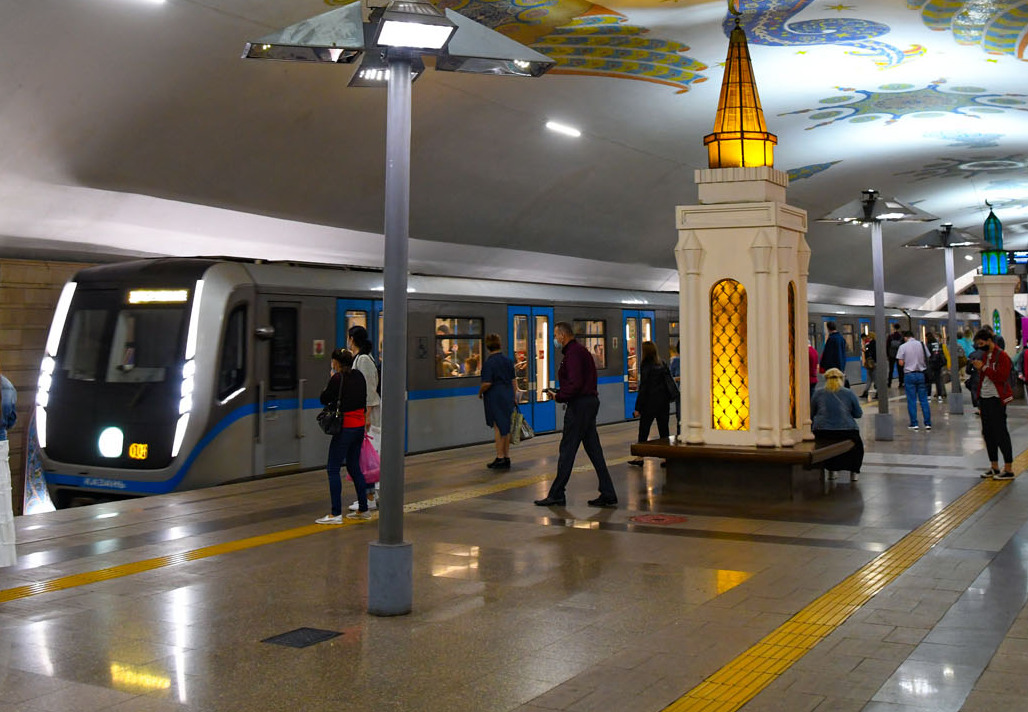
.4K in Kazan Metro

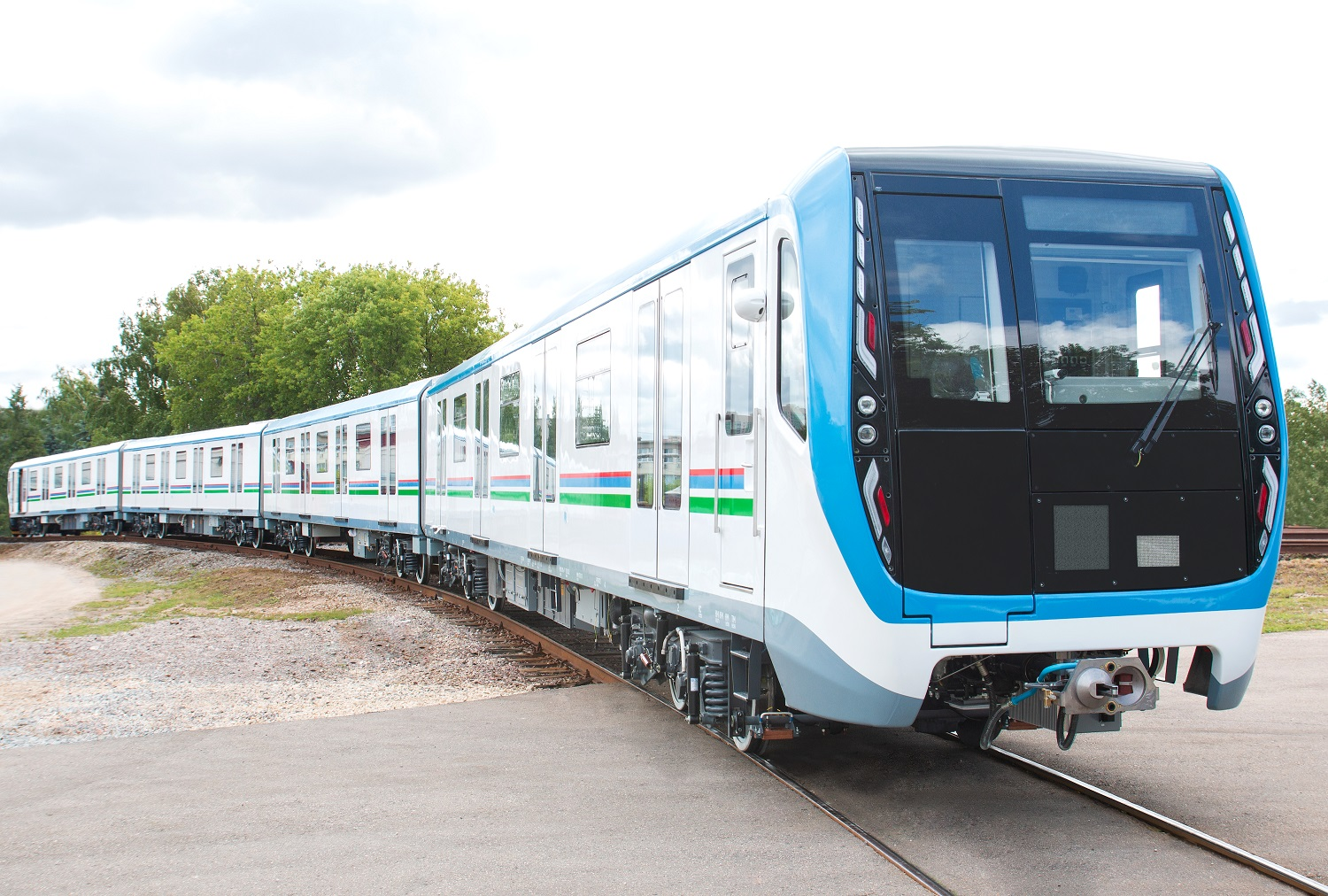
.5 for Tashkent Metro

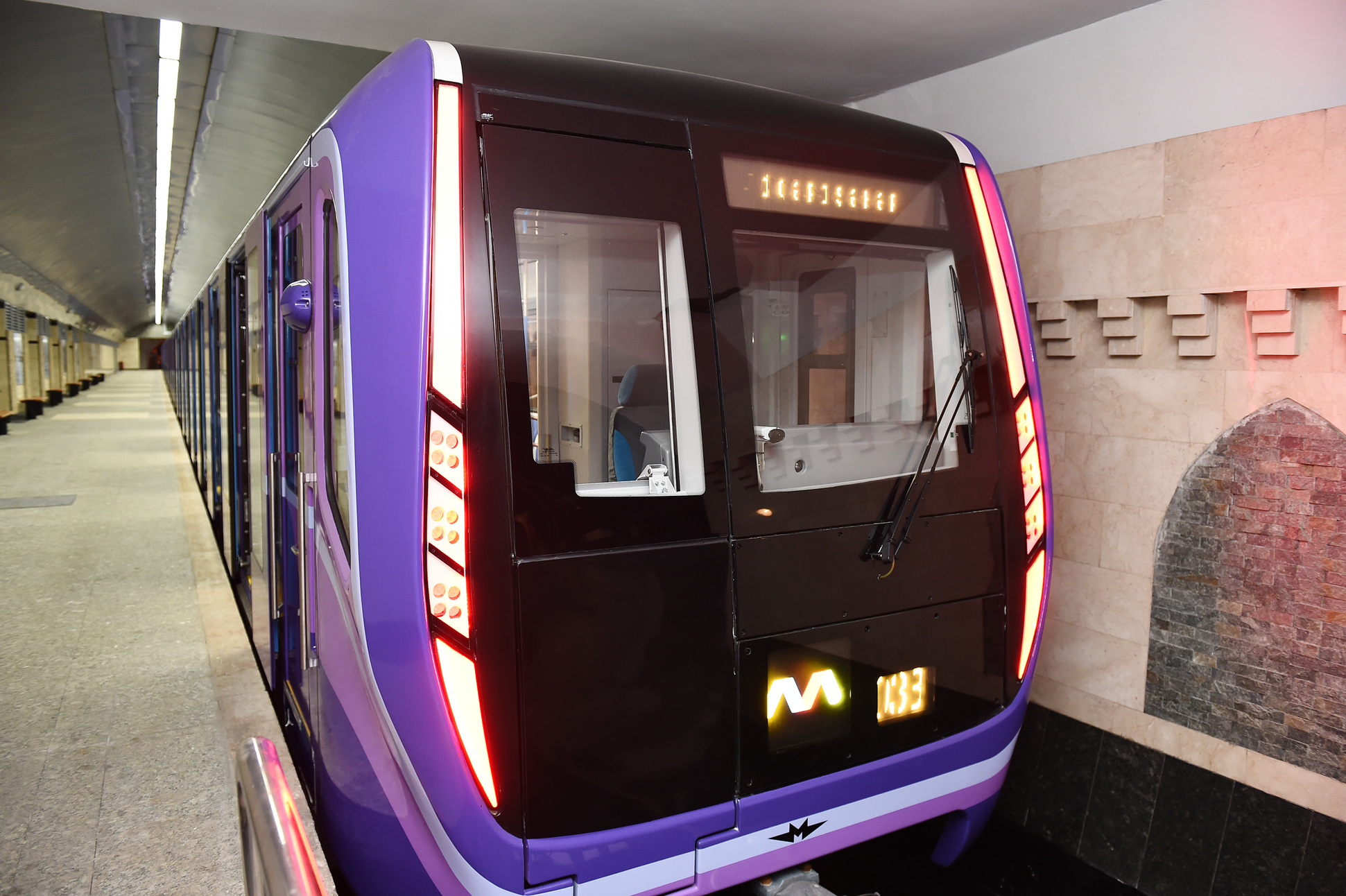
.B in Baku Metro

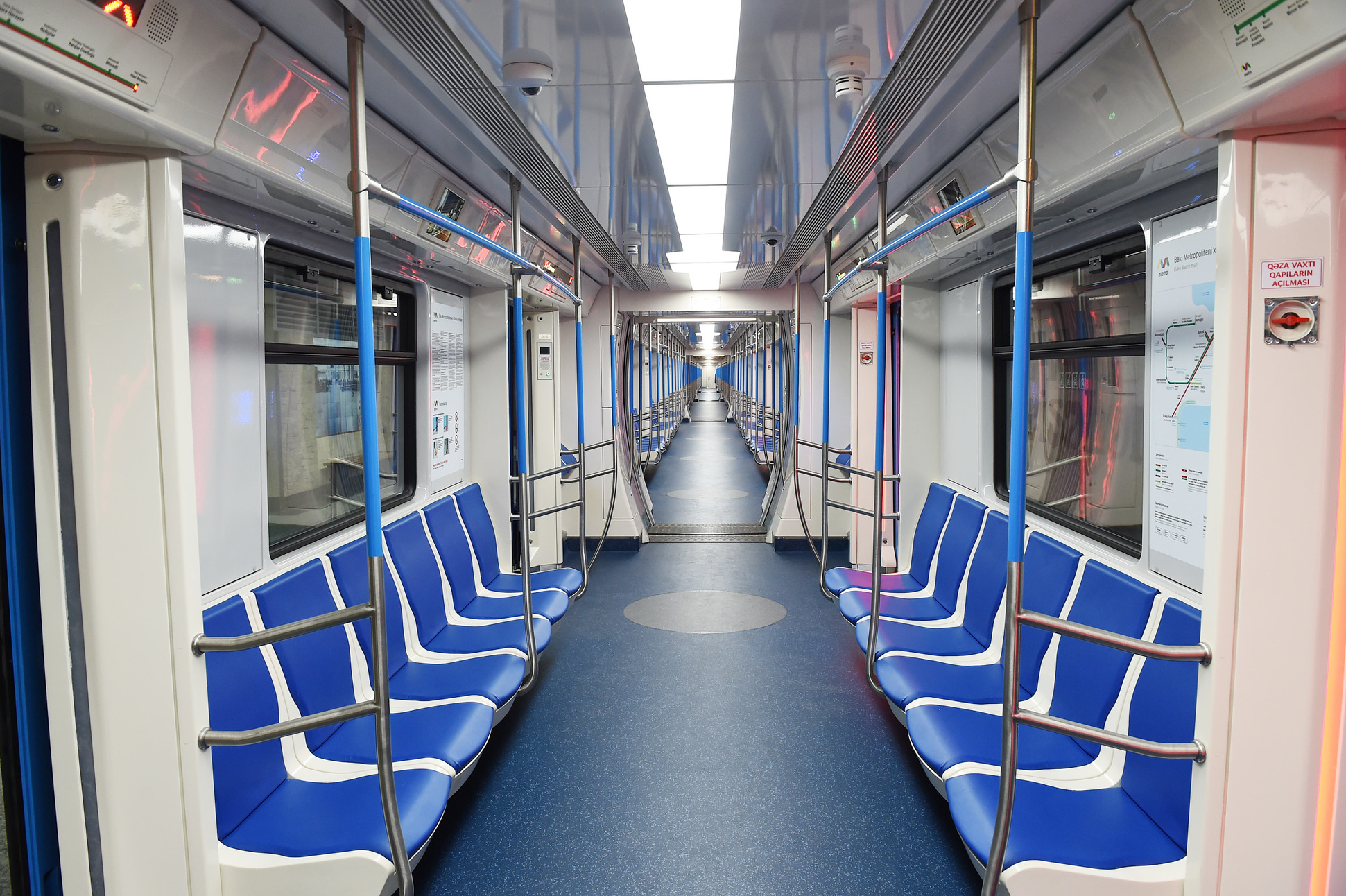
base type interior

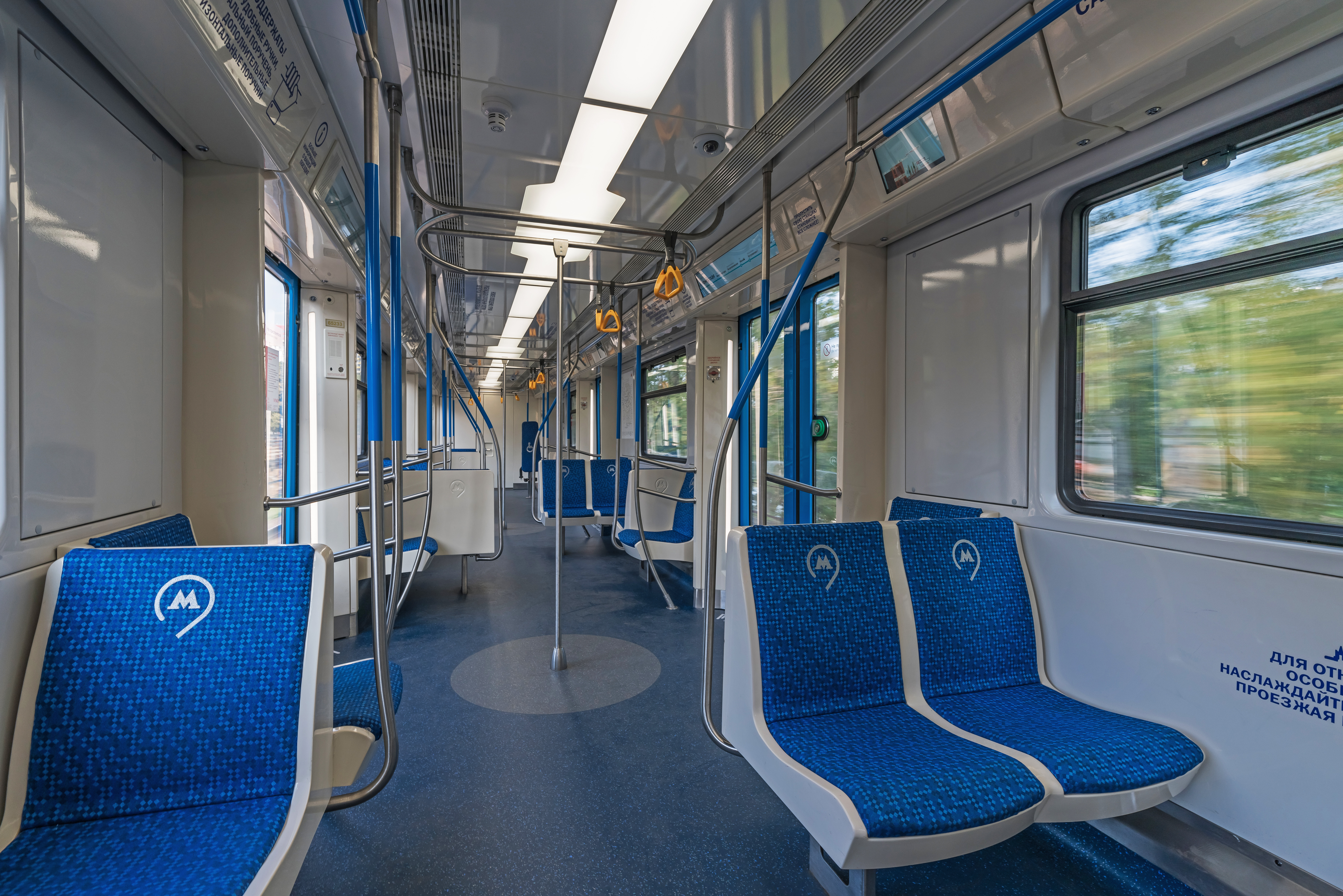
.2 modification interior

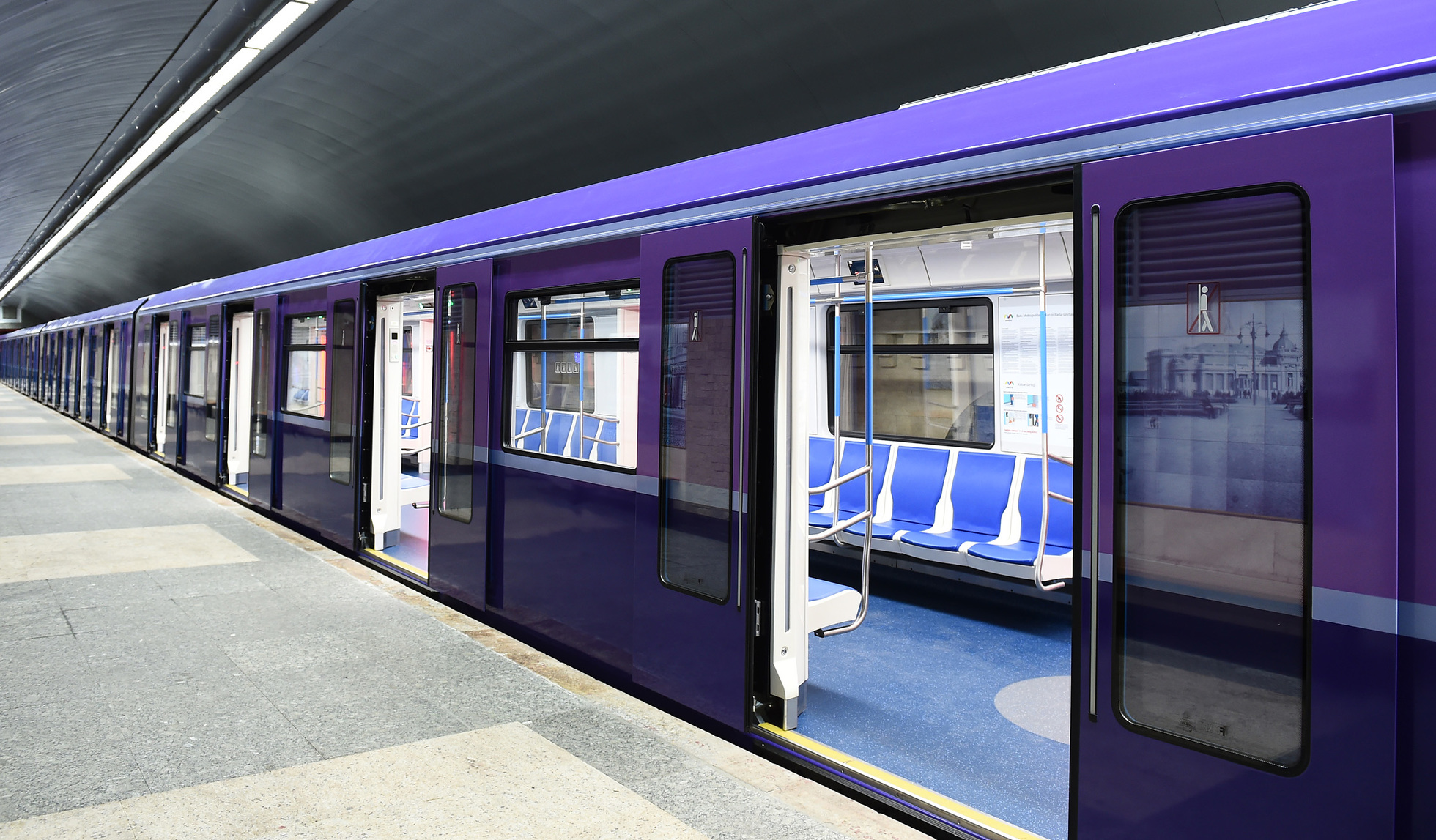
.B in Baku Metro

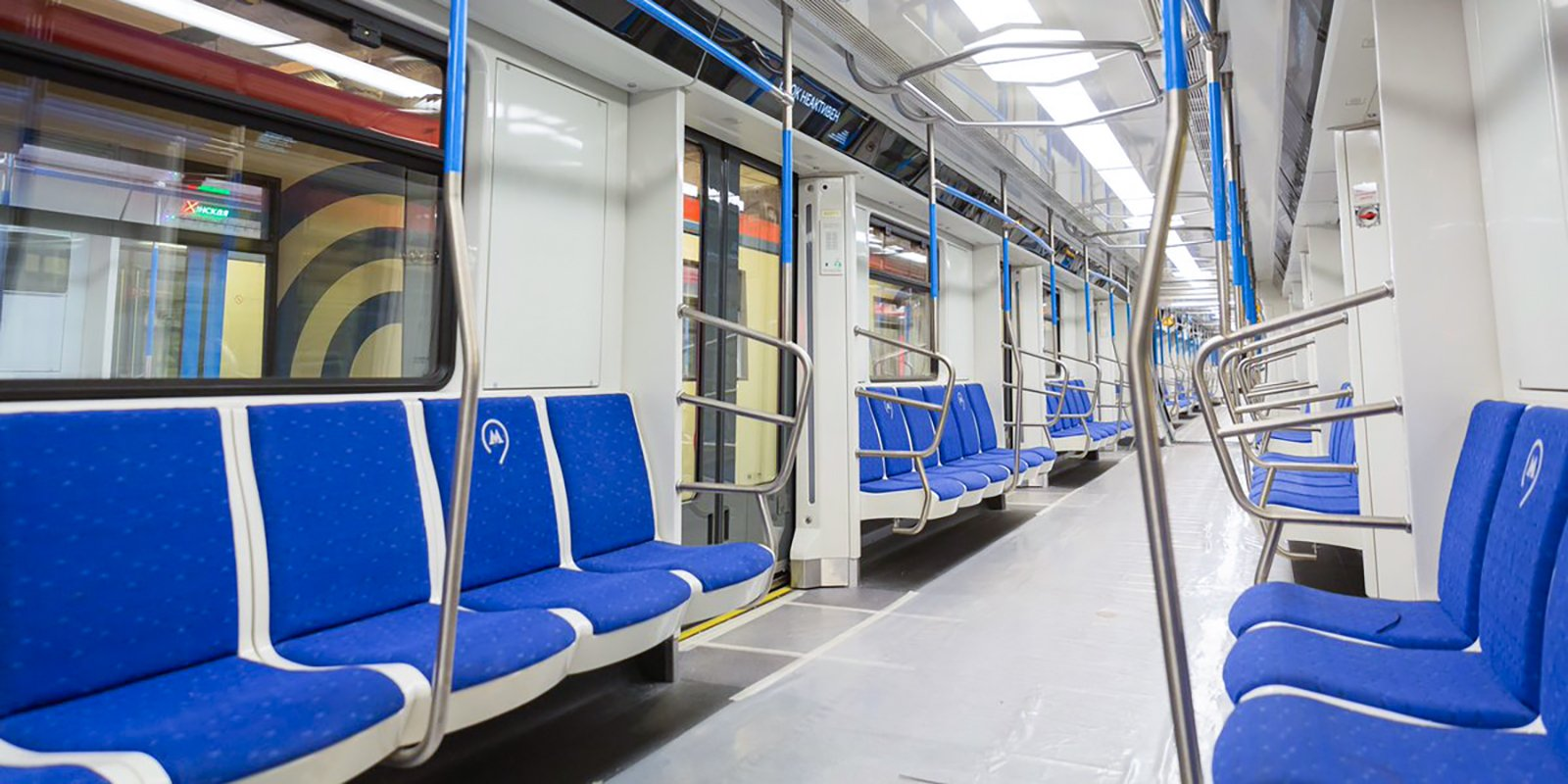
Moskva-2019 (.4) interior

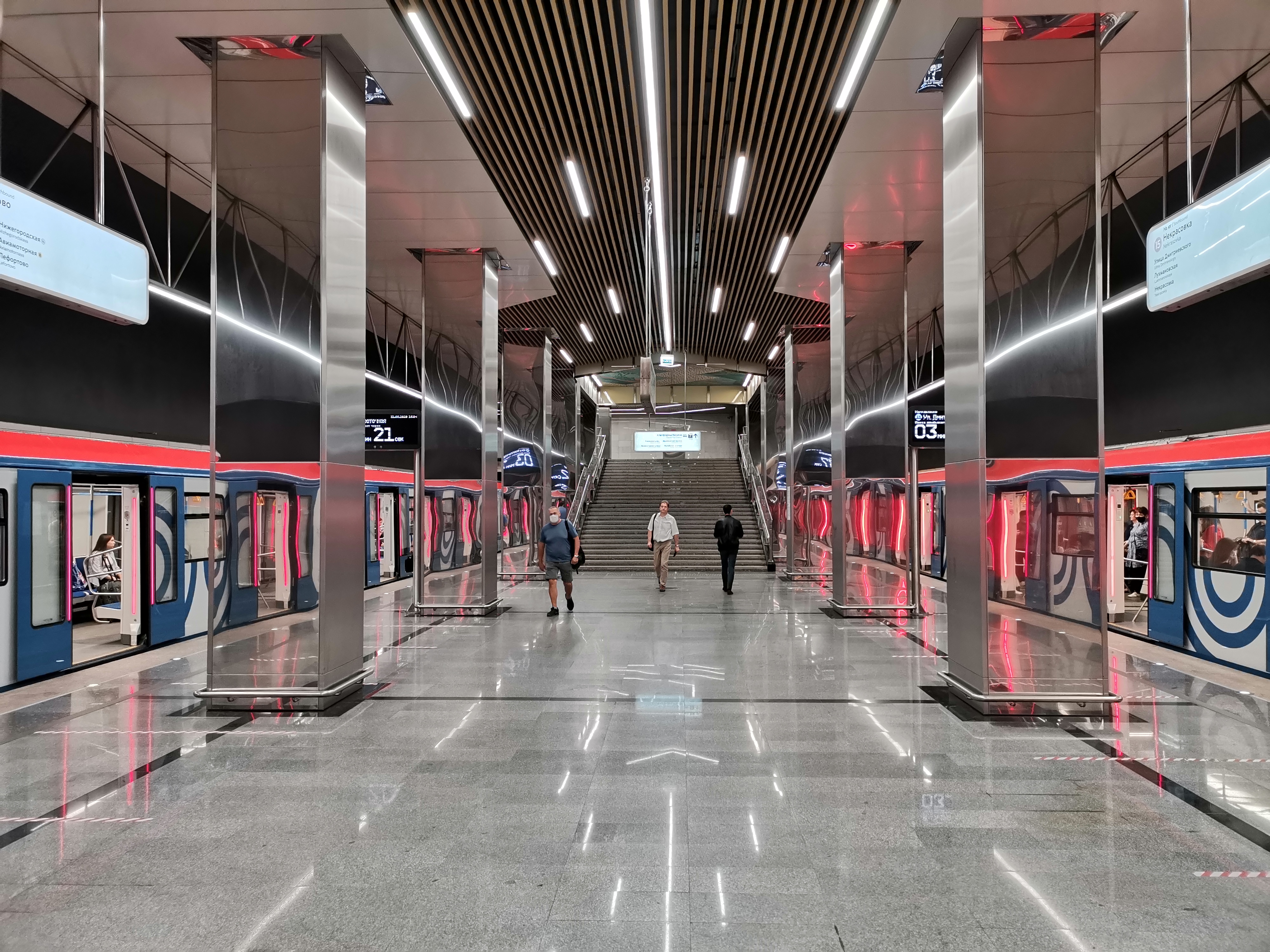
Two Moskva-2019 train on Kosino station

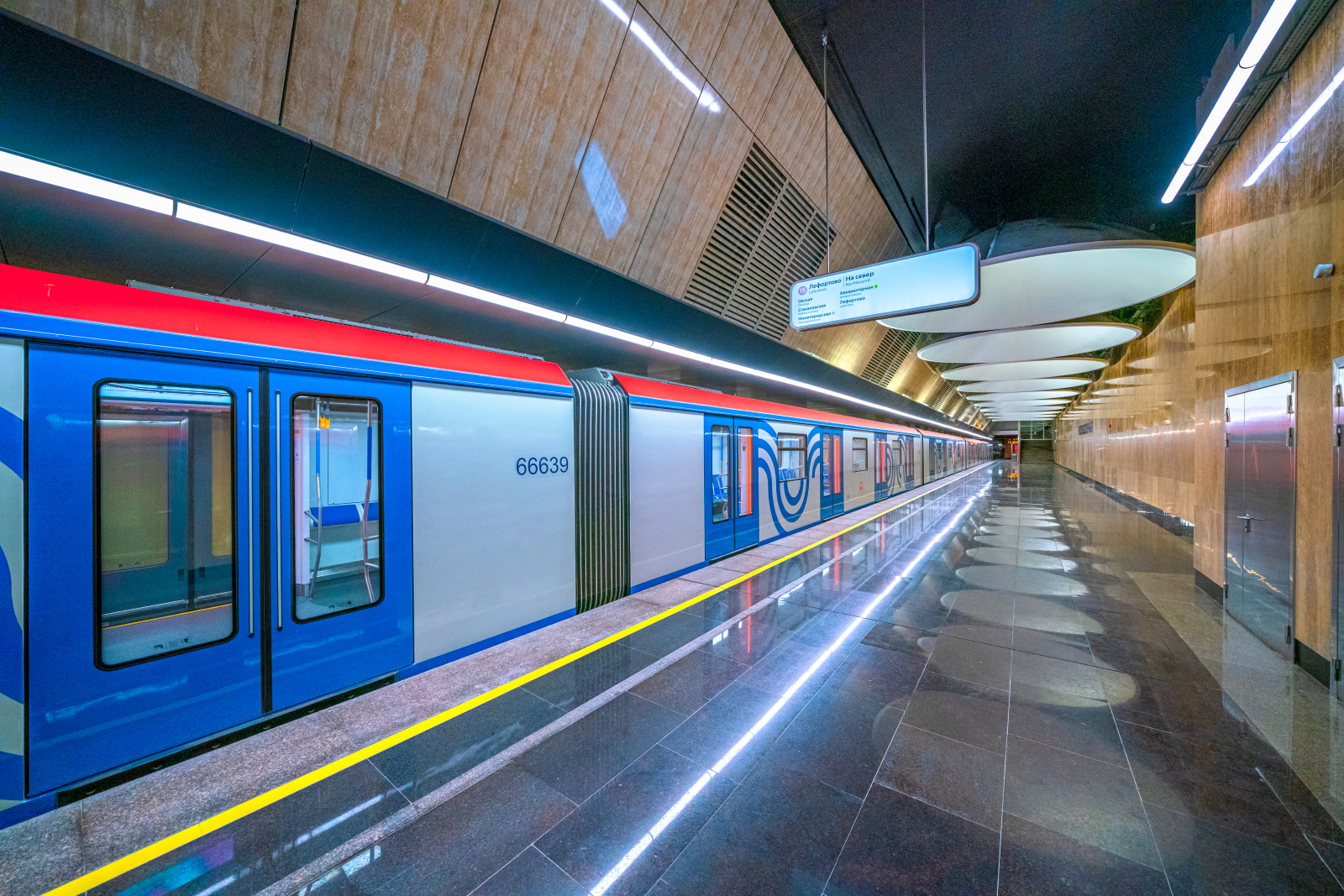
Moskva-2019 on Yugo-Vostochnaya station in the midnight

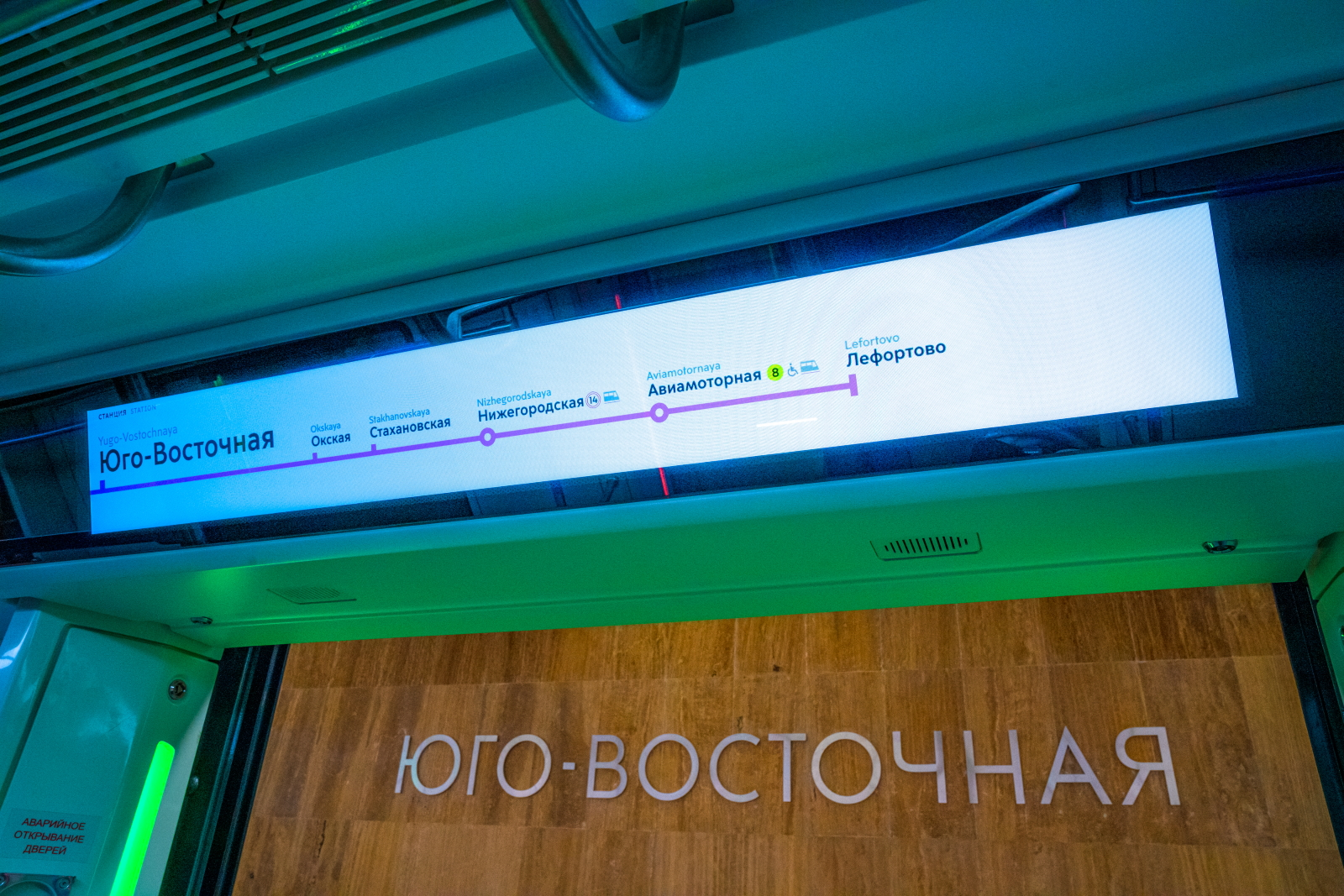
Dynamic route map display
