= Moskva (disambiguation) =

Moskva is a transliteration of "Москва", meaning Moscow in the Russian language.

Moskva may also refer to:

== Places ==
- Moskva (inhabited locality), several rural localities in Russia
- Moskva (river), central-Russian river on which Moscow lies
- 787 Moskva, a Main Belt asteroid
- Moskva (Almaty Metro), a railway station in Almaty, Kazakhstan

== Ships ==
- Soviet helicopter carrier Moskva
  - Moskva-class helicopter carrier
- Russian cruiser Moskva, a Slava class guided missile cruiser, formerly Slava, sunk during the 2022 Russian invasion of Ukraine
- Moskva (1959 icebreaker), a diesel-electric icebreaker in service in 1960–1992
- Moskva (2007 icebreaker), a diesel-electric icebreaker in service since 2008
- Moskva class, several ship classes
- Moskva (ship), a list of ships named Moskva

== Other uses ==
- Moskva, a medium-format camera made by Krasnogorsky Zavod
- Moskva, a ZX Spectrum computer clone
- Moskva, another name for the 81-765 series and the 81-775 series of metro cars on the Moscow Metro
- Moskva (album), by Russian pop group Glukoza
- Moskva (magazine), a Russian literary magazine

== See also ==
- The dictionary definition of Москва at Wiktionary
- Hotel Moskva (disambiguation)
- Moscow (disambiguation)
- Moskovsky (disambiguation)
- Moskwa (surname)
