= Moskva class =

Moskva class may refer to:

- Moskva-class helicopter carrier (Project 1123), a Soviet anti-submarine warfare carrier class
- Moskva-class icebreaker, a Soviet icebreaker class; see List of icebreakers
- Moskva-class icebreaker (Project 21900), a Russian icebreaker class; see List of icebreakers
- Moskva-type river passenger ship; see WikiCommons

== See also ==
- Slava-class cruiser, whose lead ship was renamed to Moskva after being refitted
- Moskva (ship), several ships of the name
- Moskva (disambiguation)
