= Yugo-Vostochnaya (Moscow Metro) =

Moscow Metro station

Yugo-Vostochnaya Юго-Восточная
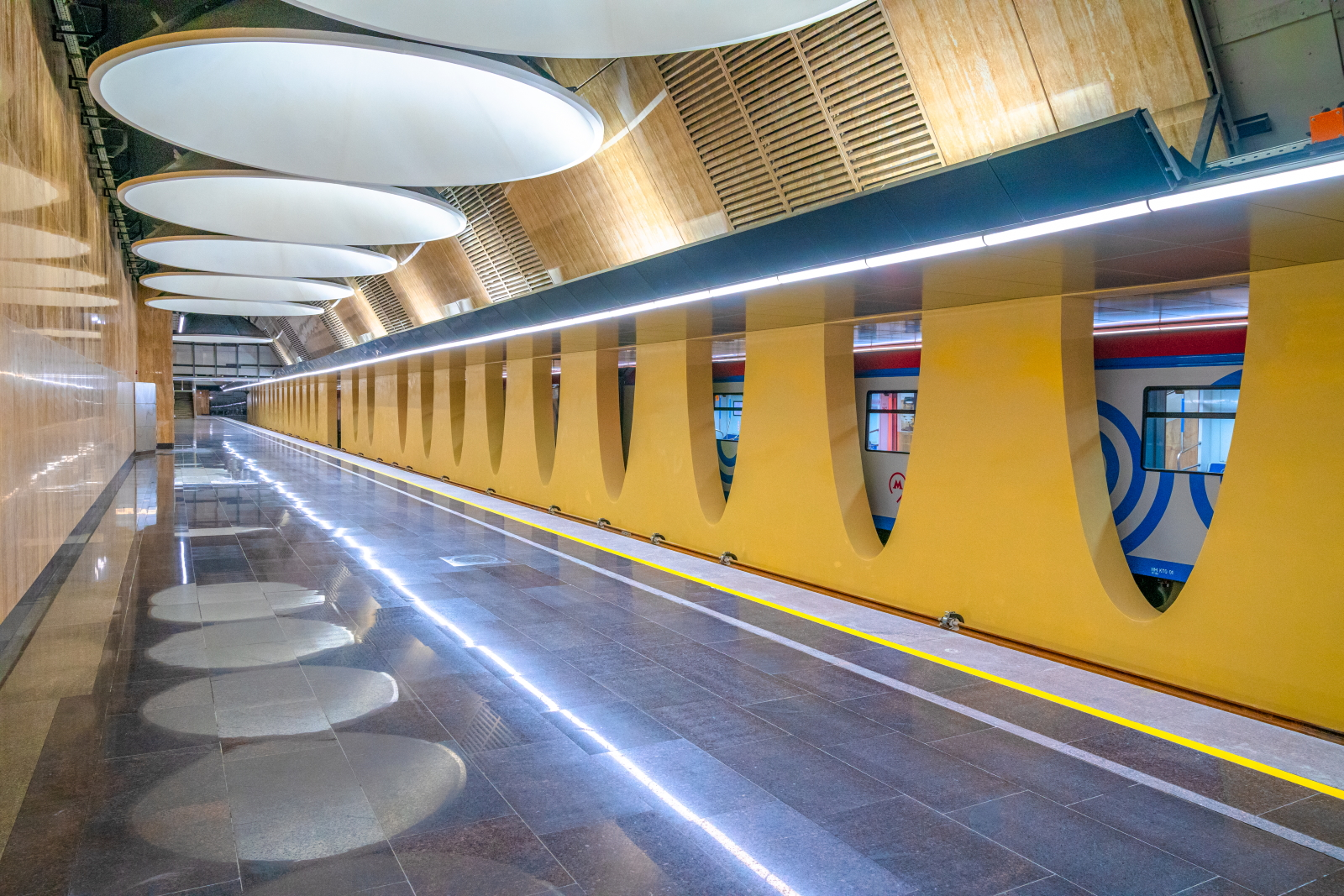

General information
- Location: Vykhino-Zhulebino District, South-Eastern Administrative Okrug; Moscow; Russia
- Coordinates: 55.705000°N 37.818055°E
- System: Moscow Metro station
- Owner: Moskovsky Metropoliten
- Line: Nekrasovskaya line
- Platforms: 2 side platforms

Construction
- Structure type: Three-span shallow-column station
- Platform levels: 1
- Parking: No

History
- Opened: 27 March 2020

Services
Preceding station	Moscow Metro	Following station
Okskaya towards Nizhegorodskaya	Nekrasovskaya line	Kosino towards Nekrasovka
Route map
Nekrasovskaya line
Location
- Location within Moscow Metro

Yugo-Vostochnaya (Russian: Юго-Восточная) is a station on the Nekrasovskaya line of the Moscow Metro. The station was opened on 27 March 2020.

== Name ==
During the planning stages, the name of the station was projected to be Ferganskaya Ulitsa for the street where the station is situated. In 2014, the station was renamed Yugo-Vostochnaya by the city. Yugo-Vostochnaya, which means “South-Eastern” in Russian, signifies the location in the southeastern part of the city.
