= Hotel Moskva =

Hotel Moskva or Hotel Moscow may refer to:

- Hotel Moskva, Belgrade, hotel in Belgrade, Serbia
- Four Seasons Hotel Moscow, hotel in Moscow, Russia
- Hotel Moscow (Moscow, Idaho), a historic three-story building in Moscow, Idaho, United States
- Hotel Moscow, characters in the manga and anime Black Lagoon

== See also ==
- Moskva (disambiguation)
- Moscow (disambiguation)
