= Stakhanovskaya =

Moscow Metro station

Stakhanovskaya Стахановская
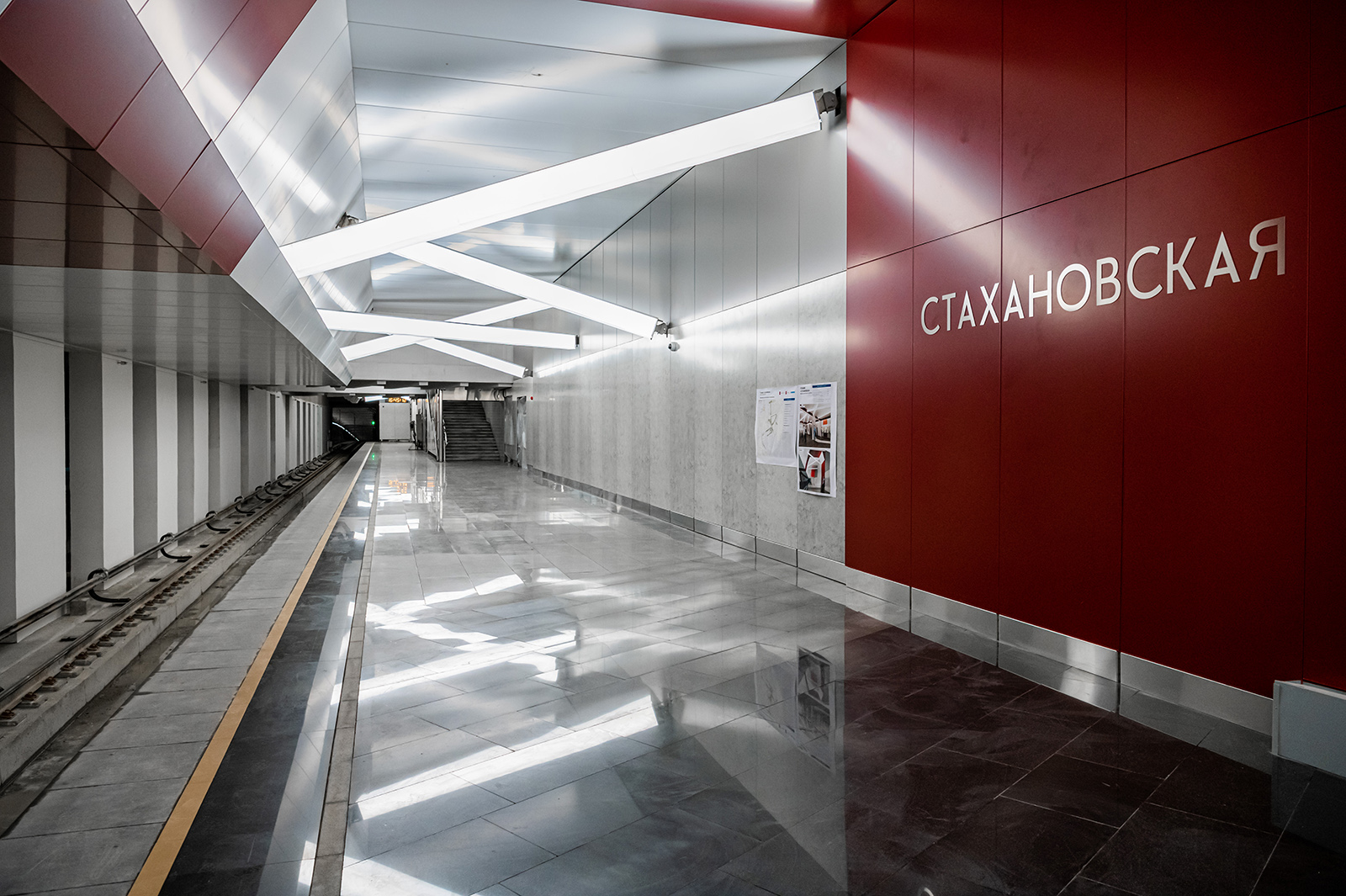

General information
- Location: Ryazansky District, South-Eastern Administrative Okrug
- Coordinates: 55.725000°N 37.761944°E
- System: Moscow Metro station
- Owner: Moskovsky Metropoliten
- Line: Nekrasovskaya line
- Platforms: 2 side platforms

Construction
- Structure type: Three-span shallow-column station
- Platform levels: 1
- Parking: No

History
- Opened: 27 March 2020

Services
Preceding station	Moscow Metro	Following station
Nizhegorodskaya Terminus	Nekrasovskaya line	Okskaya towards Nekrasovka
Route map
Nekrasovskaya line
Location
- Location within Moscow Metro

Stakhanovskaya (Russian: Стахановская) is a station on the Nekrasovskaya line of the Moscow Metro. The station was opened on 27 March 2020. The station is named for Stakhanovskaya Ulitsa, which, in turn, is named for Alexey Stakhanov, a coal miner who was named a Hero of Socialist Labour.
