= Nekrasovskaya line =

Moscow Metro line

Overview
- Locale: Moscow
- Stations: 8

Service
- Type: Rapid transit
- System: Moscow Metro
- Operator(s): Moskovsky Metropoliten
- Rolling stock: 81-765.4/766.4/767.4

History
- Opened: 3 June 2019; 6 years ago
- Last extension: 2020

Technical
- Line length: 16.7 kilometres (10.4 mi)
- Character: Underground
- Track gauge: 1,520 mm (4 ft 11 27/32 in)
- Electrification: Third rail

The Nekrasovskaya line (Russian: Некрасовская линия) (Line 15; Pink Line) is the fifteenth metro line of the Moscow Metro system in Moscow, Russia. The first segment, between Kosino and Nekrasovka, was opened on 3 June 2019. The second segment was opened on 27 March 2020. City officials expect it to relieve passenger traffic on the Tagansko-Krasnopresnenskaya line once completed.

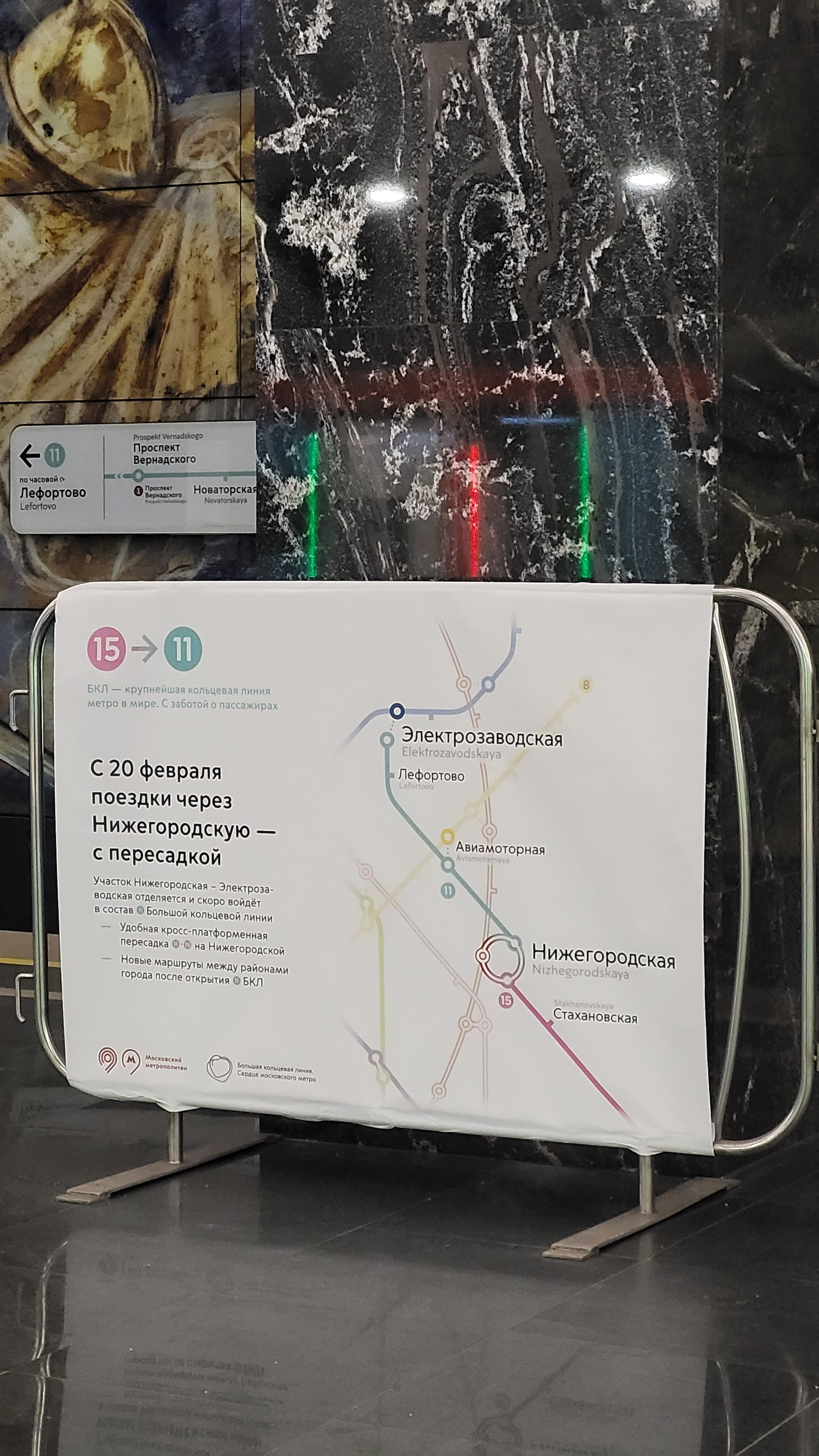
Poster for route change in 2023 at Nizhegorodskaya

From 17 February to 19 February 2023, the section of the line from Elektrozavodskaya to Nizhegorodskaya was closed in order to connect it to the Bolshaya Koltsevaya line. On 20 February, the section was transferred from the Nekrasovskaya line to the Bolshaya Koltsevaya line. In the future, it will connected with the Troitskaya line.

== Name ==
During construction, the line was referred to as the Kozhukhovskaya line. One concern about the name, which comes from a small village in the region, is that there is already a Kozhukhovskaya station on the Lyublinsko-Dmitrovskaya line that got its name from a different village with the same name. Therefore, there was the possibility of confusion.

The city opened a vote via its Active Citizen portal to rename the line to the Nekrasovskaya line. The respondents voted in favour with 73.4% supporting the name change. As of November 2018, the official Moscow Metro map referred to the line as the Nekrasovskaya line. This marked the second time in two years that Moscow residents voted for a name change for a new transit line. In 2017, a similar vote resulted in a name change for the Bolshaya Koltsevaya line from its working name – Third Interchange Contour.

== Metro line opening ==
The technical launch of the first Nekrasovka - Kosino section took place on August 31, 2018, and its opening on June 3, 2019.

On January 2, 2020, the technical commissioning of the second section "Kosino" - "Lefortovo", including a section of the Great Ring Line, was carried out. It was scheduled to open at the end of March 2020.

From March 20 to March 24, 2020, the line was closed for passengers due to the connection of the new section "Kosino" - "Lefortovo".

The second section of the Nekrasovskaya line with stations Yugo-Vostochnaya, Okskaya, Stakhanovskaya and Nizhegorodskaya was opened on March 27, 2020.

The BKL section from Lefortovo to Elektrozavodskaya was opened on December 31, 2020, as part of the Nekrasovskaya line.

From February 17 to February 19, 2023, the section of Nekrasovskaya line from Elektrozavodskaya to Nizhegorodskaya was temporarily closed to connect it to the Great Ring Line.

On February 20, 2023, the section resumed operation with a subsequent transition to the Great Circle Line.

== Stations ==
Station Name		Transfers
English	Russian	Transfers
Nizhegorodskaya	Нижегородская	Nizhegorodskaya; Nizhegorodskaya; Nizhegorodskaya
Stakhanovskaya	Стахановская	
Okskaya	Окская	
Yugo-Vostochnaya	Юго-Восточная	
Kosino	Косино	Lermontovsky Prospekt; Kosino
Ulitsa Dmitriyevskogo	Улица Дмитриевского	
Lukhmanovskaya	Лухмановская	
Nekrasovka	Некрасовка	

== Rolling stock ==
Type	Dates
Series 81-765/766/767	2019 - 2023
Series 81-765.4/766.4/767.4	2019–present
