= Moskva (ship) =

Moskva is the name of several ships. They are named for the transliteration of Russian: Москва, lit. 'Moscow'.

== Warships ==
- Russian ship Moskva (1799) – a ship of the line in service from 1799 until 1830
- Soviet destroyer Moskva (1932–1941) – a Leningrad-class destroyer leader from World War II
- Soviet battlecruiser Moskva – a planned Stalingrad-class battlecruiser scrapped prior to launch
- Soviet helicopter carrier Moskva (1965–1996) – the lead ship of Moskva-class helicopter carrier
- Russian cruiser Moskva (1976–2022) – the lead ship of the Slava-class cruiser, formerly named Slava in the Soviet Navy, and the former flagship of the Russian Black Sea Fleet.

== Civilian ships ==
- Moskva (1959 icebreaker), a Soviet diesel-electric Moskva-class icebreaker in service in 1960–1992
- Moskva (2007 icebreaker), a Russian Project 21900 icebreaker in service since 2008
- Moskva (passenger ship), several with incremental numbering "Mockba-#" to "Mockba-###"
- Moskva (2012 passenger ship) (IMO number: 9671292), a 2012 passenger ship
- Moskva (MMSI 273081717) (MMSI number: 273081717), a cargo ship
- Moskva (1978 cargo ship) (IMO number: 8889385), a 1978 cargo ship, later renamed Omskiy 103
- Moskva (tanker) (IMO number: 9842188), a crude oil tanker, later renamed Vladimir Vinogradov

== See also ==
- MV Moscow University (Russian: Московский университет, romanized: Moskovskiy Universitet), a tanker
- Moskva class, several ship classes
- Moskva (disambiguation)
