= Verkhoshizhemye =

Verkhoshizhemye Верхошижемье
- Urban-type settlement
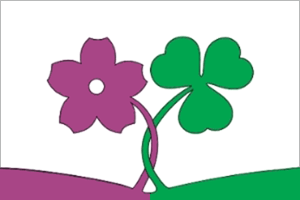
- Flag
- Interactive map of Verkhoshizhemye
- Location of Verkhoshizhemye Verkhoshizhemye (Kirov Oblast)
- Coordinates: 58.0140°N 49.1043°E
- Country: Russia
- Federal subject: Kirov Oblast
- Administrative district: Verkhoshizhemsky District
- Founded: 1678

Population (2010 Census)
  - Total: 4,357
  - Estimate (2025): 3,402 (−21.9%)
- Time zone: UTC+3 (MSK)
- Postal code: 613310
- OKTMO ID: 33608151051

Verkhoshizhemye (Russian: Верхошижемье) is an urban locality (an urban-type settlement) in Verkhoshizhemsky District of Kirov Oblast, Russia. Population: 4,357 (2010 census); 4,519 (2002 census); 5,037 (1989 Soviet census).
