= Verkhoshizhemsky District =

Verkhoshizhemsky District Верхошижемский район (Russian)
- District
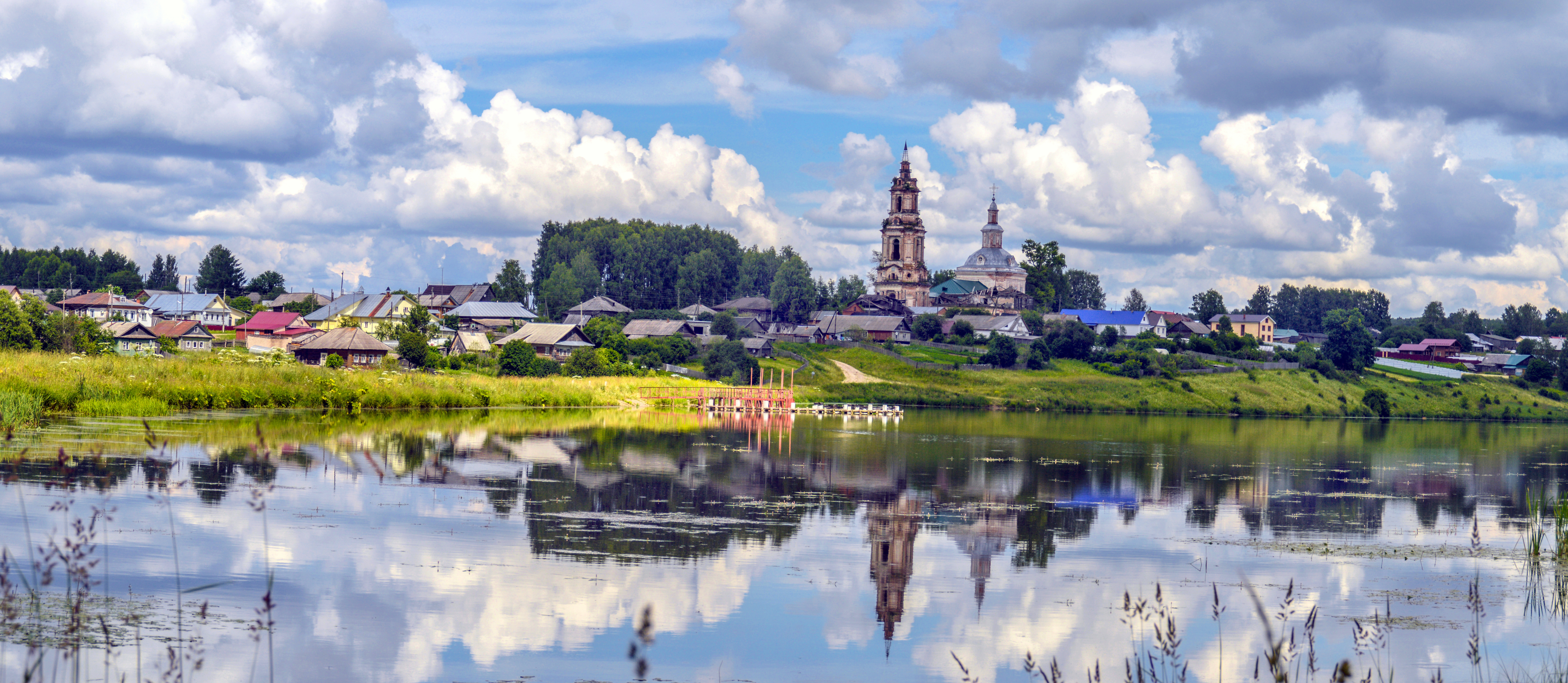

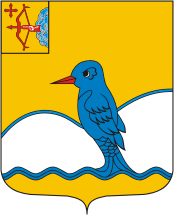
- Coat of arms
- Location of Verkhoshizhemsky District in Kirov Oblast
- Coordinates: 58°00′39″N 46°06′05″E
- Country: Russia
- Federal subject: Kirov Oblast
- Established: 8 June 1929
- Administrative center: Verkhoshizhemye

Area
  - Total: 2,415 km^{2} (932 sq mi)

Population (2010 Census)
  - Total: 9,483
  - Density: 3.927/km^{2} (10.17/sq mi)
  - Urban: 45.9%
  - Rural: 54.1%

Administrative structure
  - Administrative divisions: 1 Urban-type settlements, 8 Rural okrugs
  - Inhabited localities: 1 urban-type settlements, 69 rural localities

Municipal structure
  - Municipally incorporated as: Verkhoshizhemsky Municipal District
  - Municipal divisions: 1 urban settlements, 8 rural settlements
- Time zone: UTC+3 (MSK)
- OKTMO ID: 33608000
- Website: http://www.avr43.ru/

Verkhoshizhemsky District (Russian: Верхошижемский райо́н) is an administrative and municipal district (raion), one of the thirty-nine in Kirov Oblast, Russia. It is located in the center of the oblast. The area of the district is 2,415 square kilometers (932 sq mi). Its administrative center is the urban locality (an urban-type settlement) of Verkhoshizhemye. Population: 9,483 (2010 census); 10,878 (2002 Census); 12,849 (1989 Soviet census). The population of Verkhoshizhemye accounts for 45.9% of the district's total population.
