= Moskwa (surname) =

Moskwa is a surname. Notable people with this surname include:

- Anna Moskwa (born 1979), Polish politician
- Jacek Moskwa (born 1948), Polish journalist
- Kornelia Moskwa (born 1996), Polish volleyball player
- Robert Moskwa (born 1965), Polish actor
- Stefan Moskwa (1935–2004), Polish Roman Catholic priest

== See also ==
- Moskva (disambiguation)
