= Nizhegorodskaya Street =

Street in Moscow, Russia

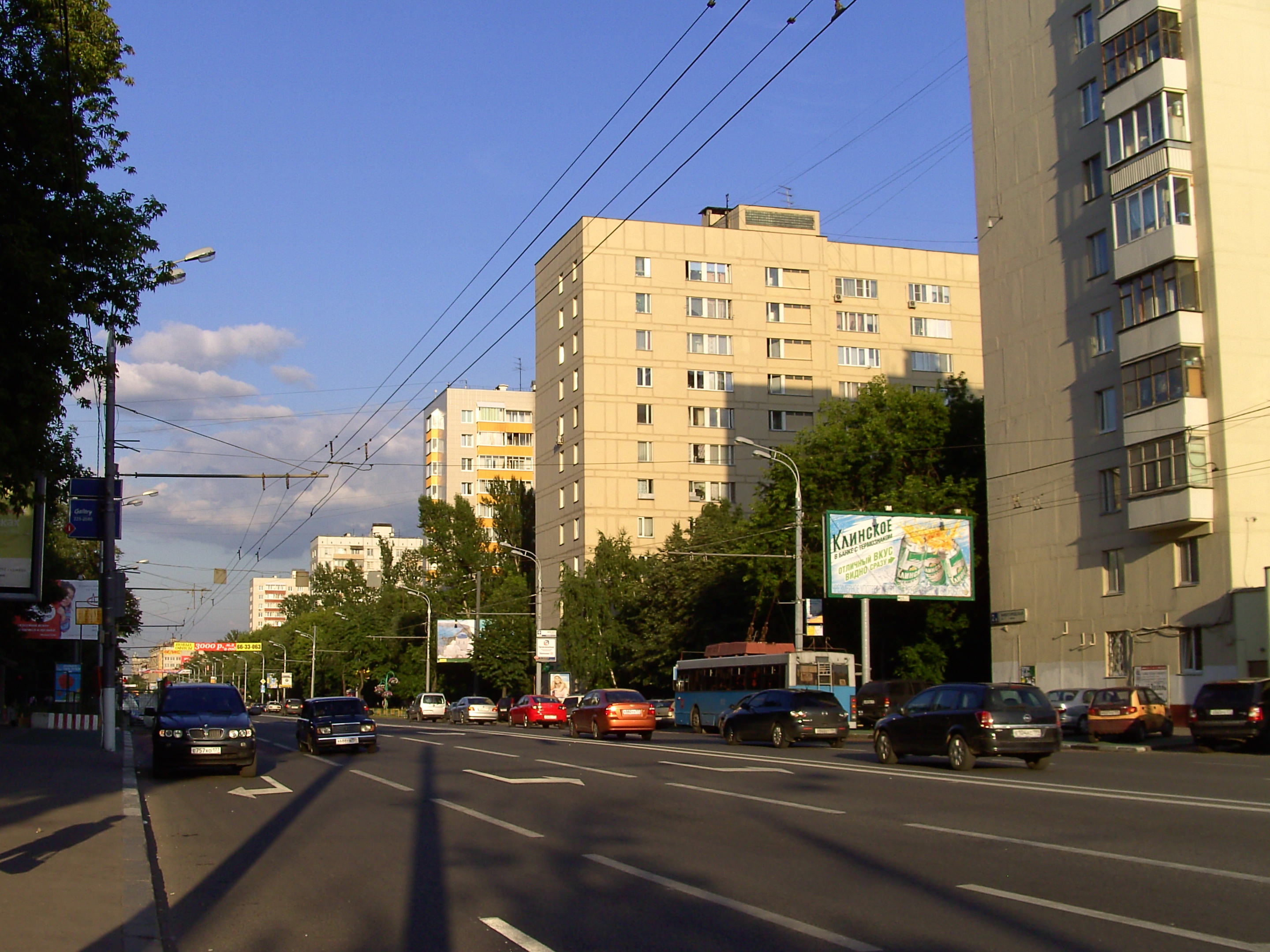
- Interactive map of Nizhegorodskaya Street
- Native name: Nizhegorodskaya Ulitsa (Russian)
- Location: Moscow; Central Administrative Okrug; Tagansky District
- Coordinates: 55°44′29″N 37°39′15″E

Nizhegorodskaya Street (Nizhegorodskaya Ulitsa) is a street in Moscow, Russia.

== Name ==
It is named for Nizhegorodsky Station, which was built in 1861 and closed in the 1950s. That station in turn was named for Nizhny Novgorod.

== Location ==
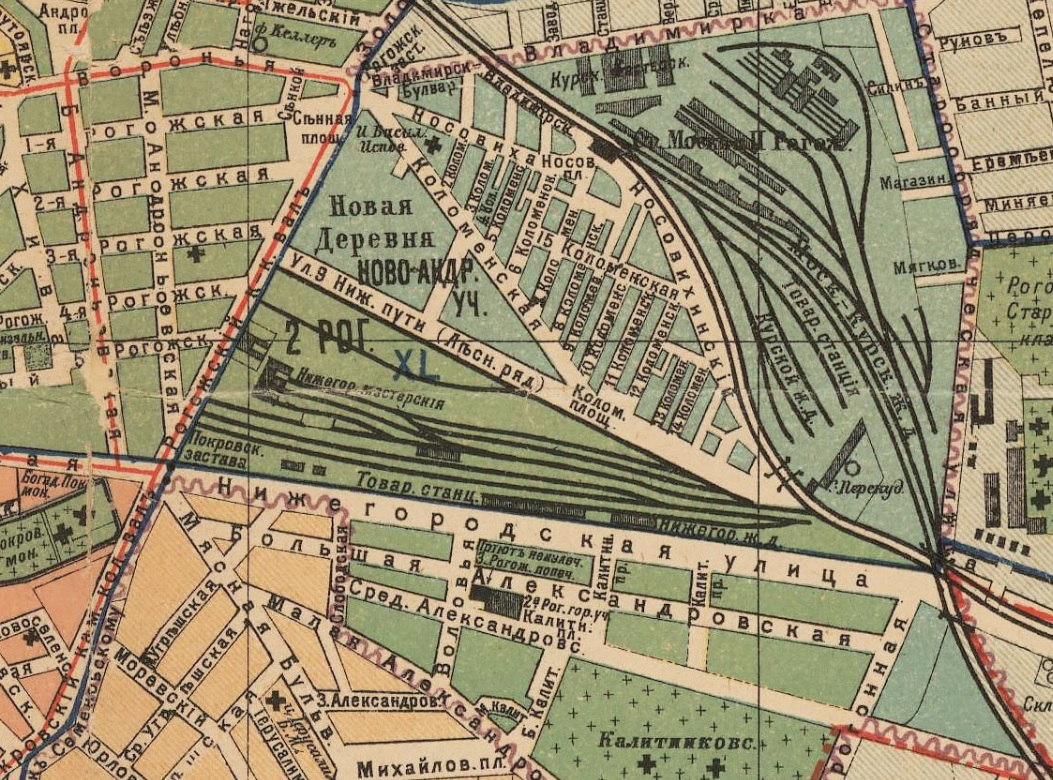
Nizhegorodskaya Ulitsa south of Nizhegorodsky Station

The street is located in Tagansky District of the Central Administrative Okrug, south of the former Nizhegorodsky Station.
