= Kosino (Moscow Metro) =

Moscow Metro station

Kosino Косино
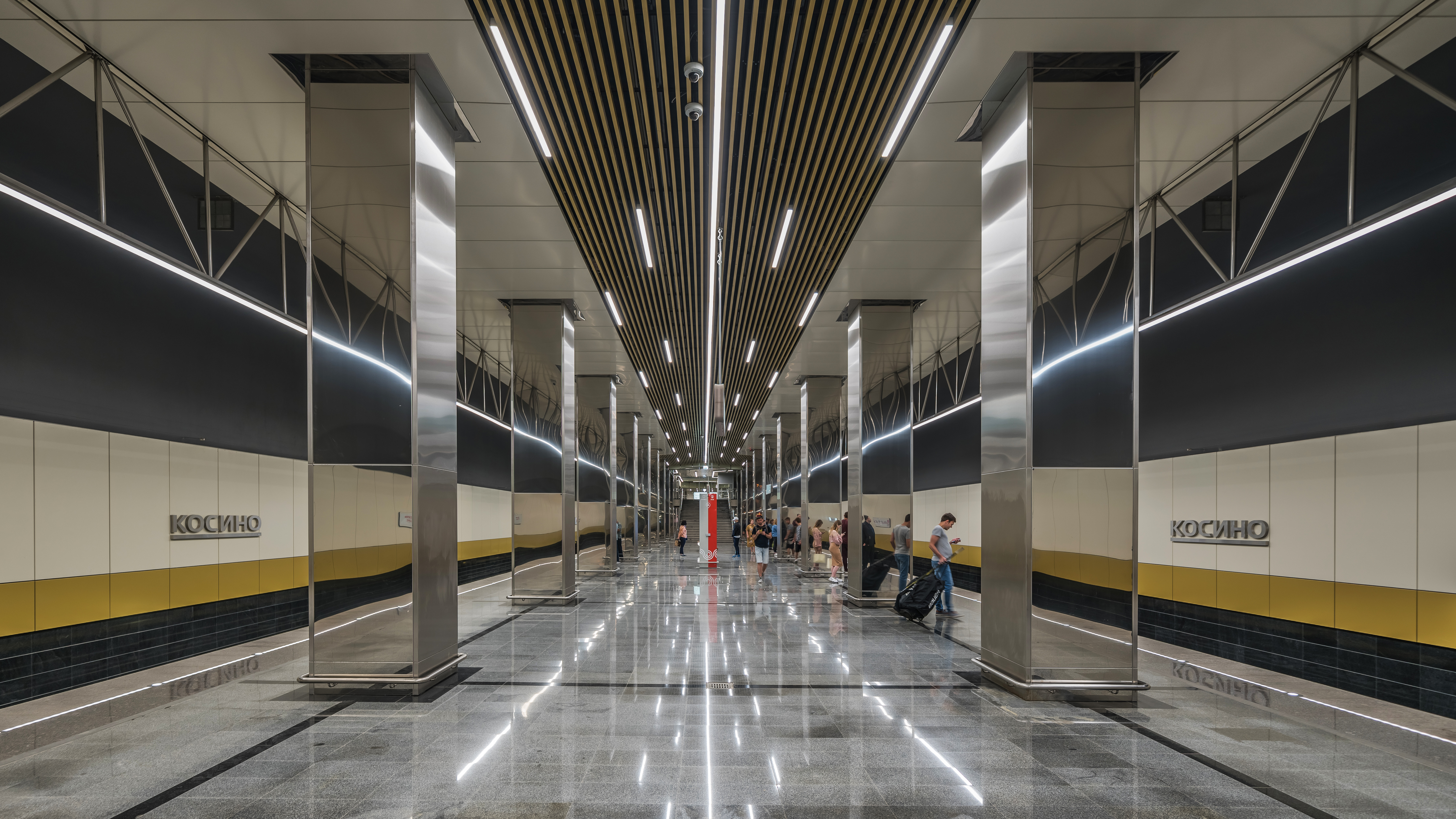

General information
- Location: Vykhino-Zhulebino District, South-Eastern Administrative Okrug; Moscow; Russia
- Coordinates: 55.704166°N 37.847777°E
- System: Moscow Metro station
- Owner: Moskovsky Metropoliten
- Line: Nekrasovskaya line
- Platforms: 1 island platform

Construction
- Structure type: Three-span shallow-column station
- Depth: 18 metres (59 ft)
- Platform levels: 1
- Parking: No

History
- Opened: 3 June 2019

Services
Preceding station	Moscow Metro	Following station
Yugo-Vostochnaya towards Nizhegorodskaya	Nekrasovskaya line	Ulitsa Dmitriyevskogo towards Nekrasovka
Vykhino towards Planernaya	Tagansko-Krasnopresnenskaya line transfer at Lermontovsky Prospekt	Zhulebino towards Kotelniki
Route map
Nekrasovskaya line
Location
- Location within Moscow Metro

Kosino (Russian: Косинó) is a station on the Nekrasovskaya line of the Moscow Metro. It was opened on 3 June 2019 as the western terminus of the inaugural stretch of the line, between Kosino and Nekrasovka. The station has a transfer to Lermontovsky Prospekt on the Tagansko-Krasnopresnenskaya line.
