= Nizhegorodskaya (Moscow Metro) =

Moscow Metro station

Nizhegorodskaya Нижегородская
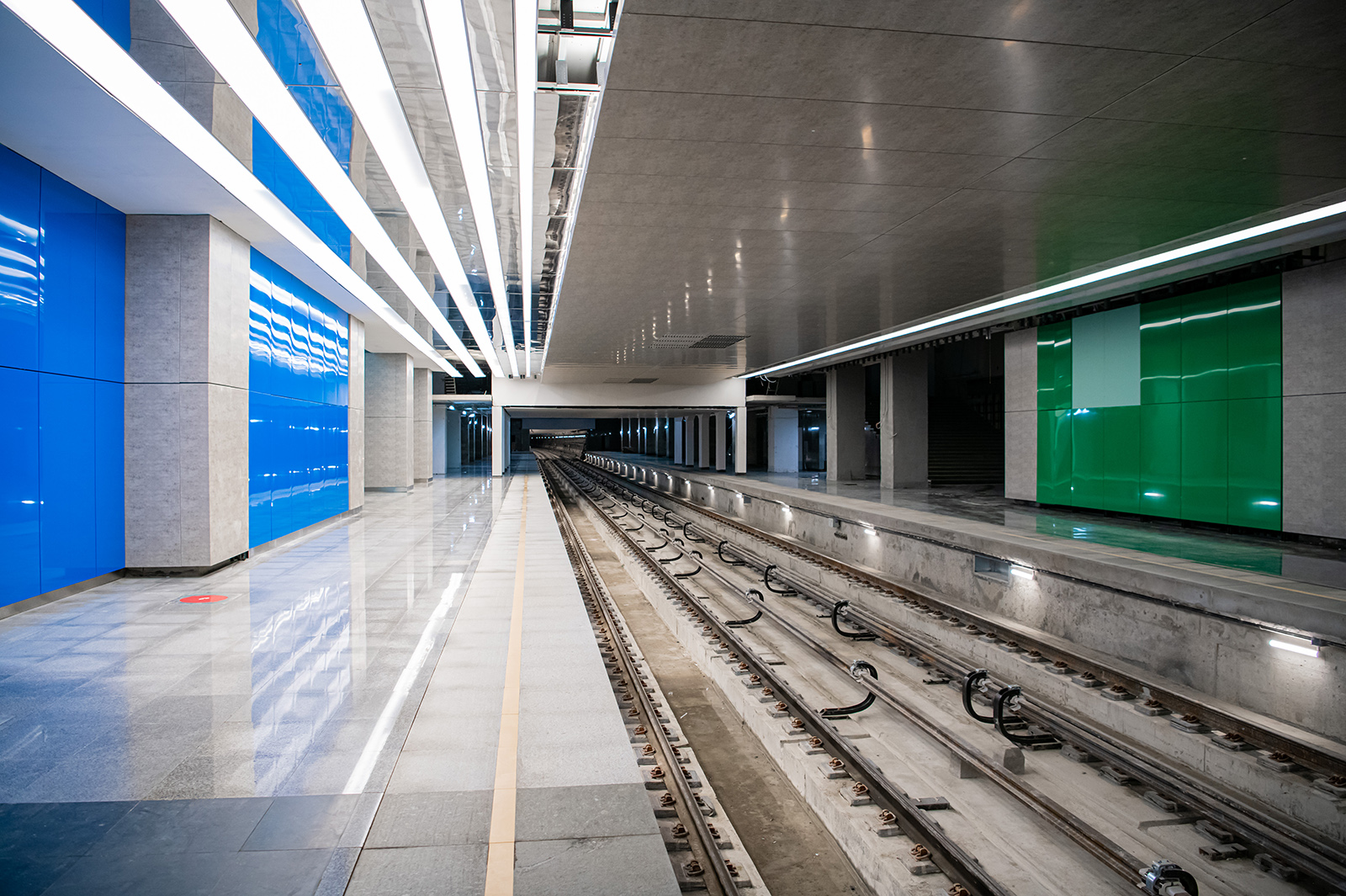
- Station in January 2020

General information
- Location: Nizhegorodsky District; South-Eastern Administrative Okrug; Moscow; Russia
- Coordinates: 55.732500°N 37.728611°E
- System: Moscow Metro station
- Owner: Moskovsky Metropoliten
- Lines: Bolshaya Koltsevaya line Nekrasovskaya line
- Platforms: Island platform

Construction
- Structure type: Three-span shallow-column station
- Platform levels: 1
- Parking: No

History
- Opened: 27 March 2020

Services
Preceding station	Moscow Metro	Following station
Aviamotornaya anticlockwise / outer	Bolshaya Koltsevaya line	Tekstilshchiki clockwise / inner
Terminus	Nekrasovskaya line	Stakhanovskaya towards Nekrasovka
Out-of-station interchange
Andronovka anticlockwise / outer	Moscow Central Circle transfer at Nizhegorodskaya	Novokhokhlovskaya clockwise / inner
Route map
Nekrasovskaya line
Location
- Location within Moscow Metro

Nizhegorodskaya (Russian: Нижегородская) is a station on the Nekrasovskaya line and the Bolshaya Koltsevaya line of the Moscow Metro. The station was opened on 27 March 2020.

Initially, the station operated as part of the Nekrasovskaya line with direct service from Nekrasovka to Aviamotornaya. Once the Bolshaya Koltsevaya line opened, Nekrasovskaya trains began to terminate here with a cross-platform interchange to that line.

== Name ==
The station is named for the street on which it is situated. Nizhegorodskaya Street, in turn, is named for the city of Nizhny Novgorod and Nizhegorodsky Station, which was built in 1861 and closed in the 1950s. Nizhny Novgorod Metro has a station called Moskovskaya (lit. Moscow Station), which has a very similar two-platform layout to that of Nizhegorodskaya.

== Transfer ==
Out-of-station transfers available to Nizhegorodskaya on the Moscow Central Circle. The basic idea for the interchange node of the station was Moskovskaya station of the Nizhny Novgorod Metro.
