= Nekrasovka (Moscow Metro) =

Moscow Metro station

Nekrasovka Некрасовка
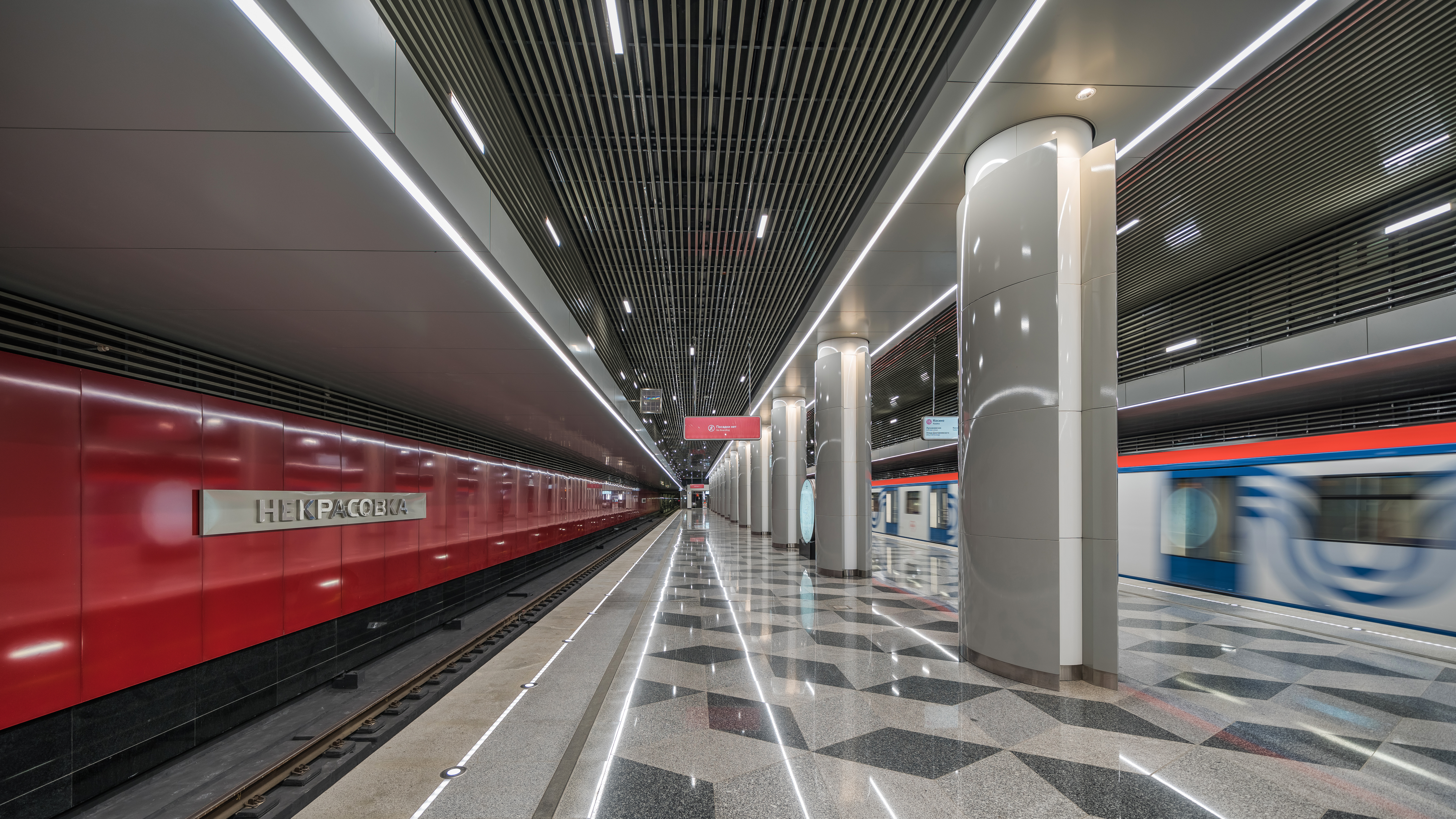

General information
- Location: Nekrasovka District, South-Eastern Administrative Okrug; Moscow; Russia
- Coordinates: 55.703611°N 37.926388°E
- System: Moscow Metro station
- Owner: Moskovsky Metropoliten
- Line: Nekrasovskaya line
- Platforms: 1 island platform

Construction
- Structure type: Two-span shallow-column station
- Depth: 14 metres (46 ft)
- Platform levels: 1
- Parking: No

History
- Opened: 3 June 2019

Services
Preceding station	Moscow Metro	Following station
Lukhmanovskaya towards Nizhegorodskaya	Nekrasovskaya line	Terminus
Route map
Nekrasovskaya line
Location
- Location within Moscow Metro

Nekrasovka (Russian: Некрасовка) is a station on the Nekrasovskaya line of the Moscow Metro. It was opened on 3 June 2019 as the eastern terminus of the inaugural stretch of the line, between Kosino and Nekrasovka. It is the easternmost station on the Moscow Metro.

== Name ==
The station is named for Nekrasovka District, previously the settlement of Nekrasovka, east of Moscow.

== Gallery ==
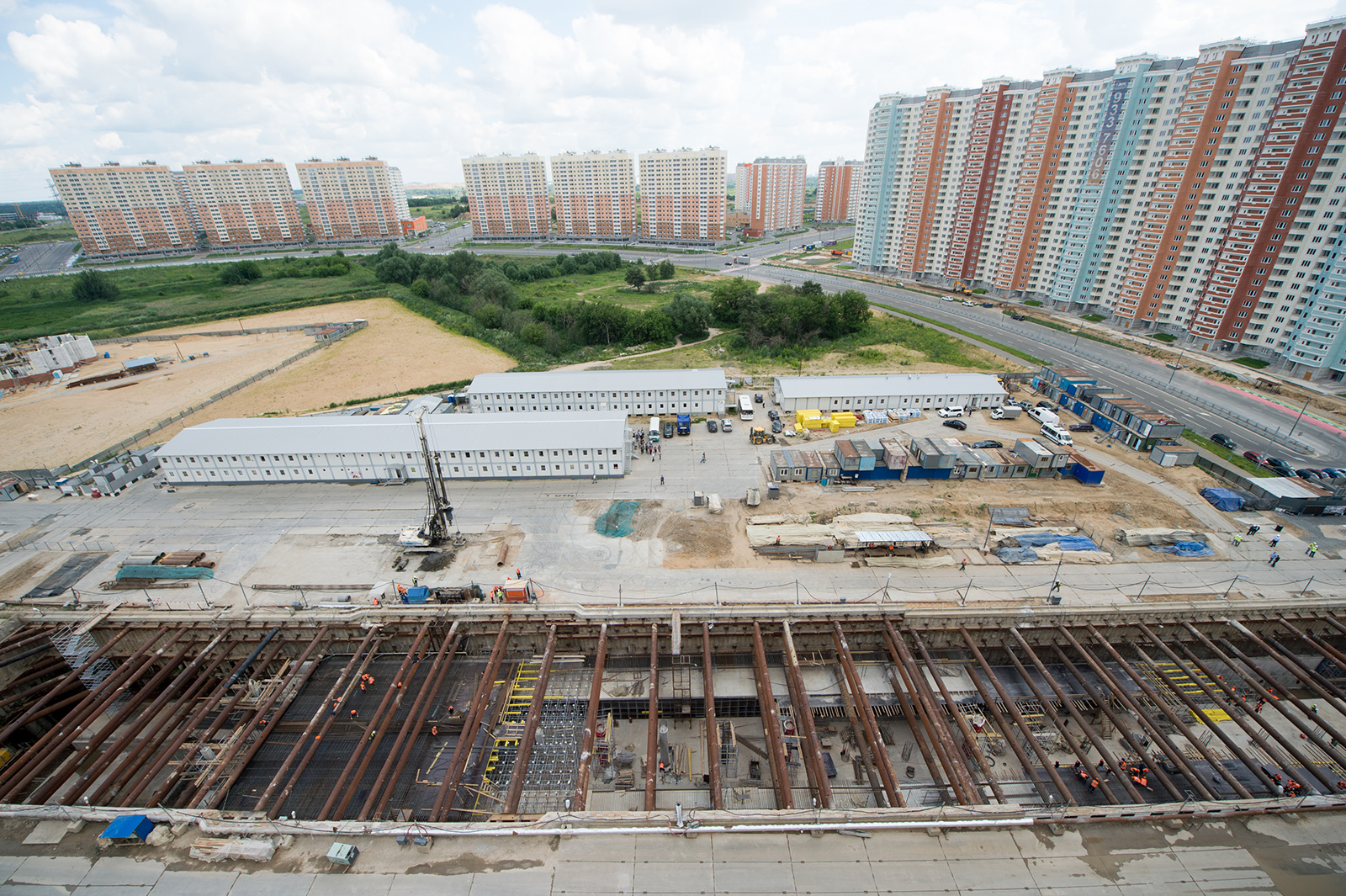
Construction of the station in June 2016
