= City Projects Foundation =

Russian non-profit (2012–2022)

City Projects Foundation by Ilya Varlamov and Maxim Katz
- Founded: 2012
- Founders: Ilya Varlamov, Maxim Katz
- Location: Russia
- Field: Urbanism, urban planning, nominating candidates for municipal councils
- Key people: Maxim Katz, Ilya Varlamov, Darya Besedina, Anastasia Bryukhanova
- Website: http://city4people.ru/

The City Projects Foundation (Russian: Городски́е прое́кты), also called the Urban Projects Foundation, was a Russian non-profit foundation created by Russian politician Maxim Katz and Russian journalist Ilya Varlamov in 2012, and which had ceased its activities by in March 2022. The foundation was aimed at improving the urban environment through the use of modern urbanism data. The foundation overseas several initiatives in Moscow, which have met with mixed reactions from the authorities, and it also worked in many regions of Russia.

In 2019, Daria Besedina, a member of the organization, was elected a deputy of the Moscow City Duma of the VII convocation. In 2020, the head of "Urban Projects" in Tomsk, David Avet'yan, became a deputy of the City Duma of Tomsk, and the head of "Urban Projects" in Samara, Vadim Alekseev, became a deputy of the council of the Oktyabrsky district of Samara.

== Creation ==
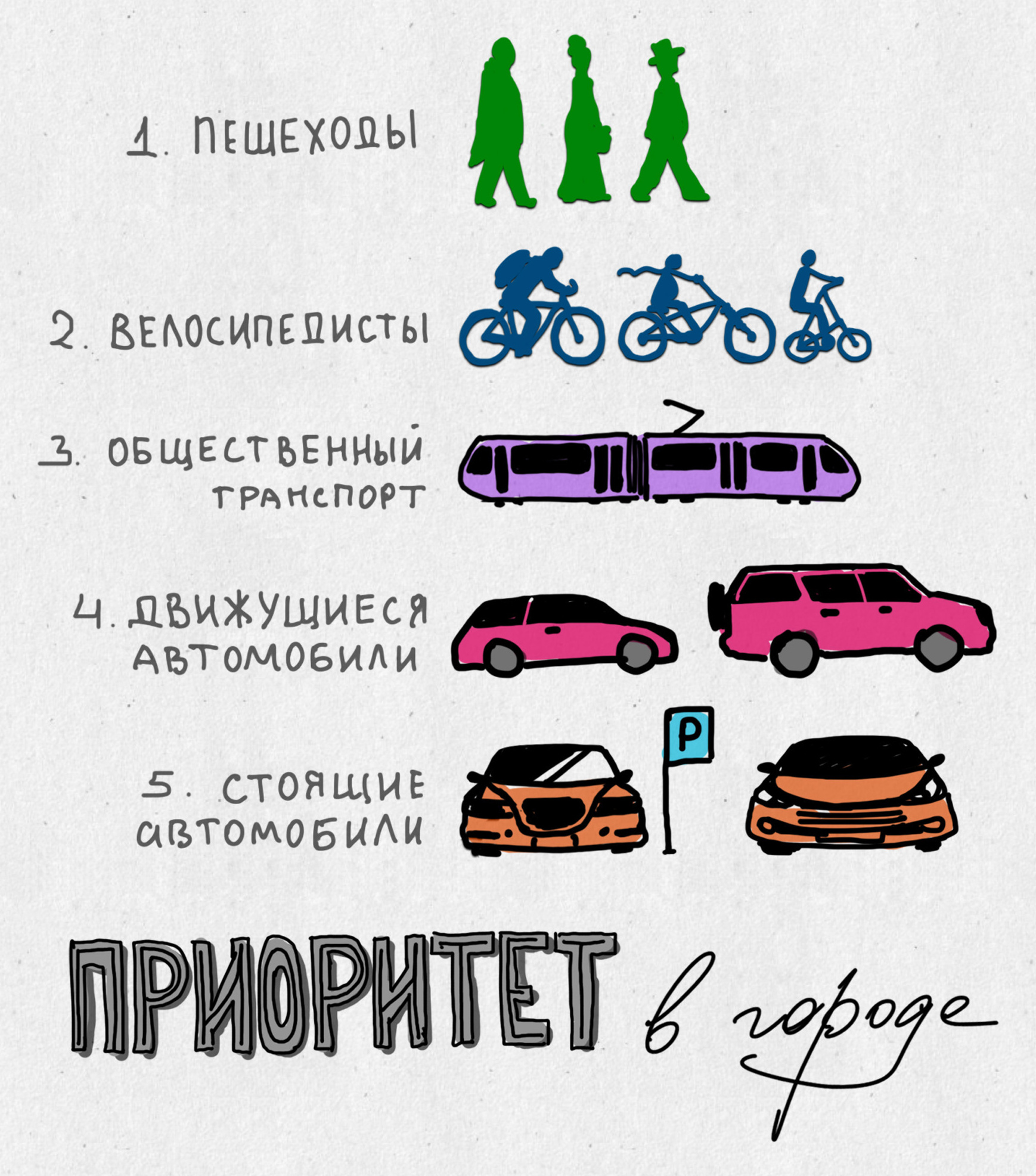
Urban priorities from the foundation's perspective

The foundation was founded after Ilya Varlamov failed to gather enough signatures to run for mayor of Omsk. Initially, Varlamov's team planned to reconstruct streets and change the overall architectural appearance of the city, but after the idea failed, it was decided to start similar activities first and foremost in Moscow. Later elected mayor Vyacheslav Dvorakovsky supported Varlamov's ideas, stating in his pre-election speech that he was ready to implement his projects.

On June 4, 2012, the project was launched. Katz and Varlamov announced that they planned to make recommendations on the appearance of Tverskaya Street in Moscow, landscaping, placement of street furniture, and more. They planned to give lectures, translate literature, create and distribute visual materials.

The first announced initiatives were:

- placing street ashtrays on Tverskaya
- researching and developing recommendations for improving pedestrian infrastructure on Tverskaya
- preparing to hold a Carnival in Moscow
- researching and developing a project to change streets, public transport routes, parks, courtyards, and squares in the Shchukino area

At the same time, Ilya Varlamov explained the procedure for determining and implementing tasks as follows:

There are two ways to implement it: the first is that we offer ideas and raise money for them, and the second is proposals from residents. Residents of any city can offer us some interesting idea, and we will try to help them implement, develop, or support it with our tools.

— Ilya Varlamov

The "Projects" are jointly funded through sponsorships and Crowdfunding. Also in 2012, the Information Center of the Moscow Government planned to become an information sponsor of the foundation without financial funding. According to the foundation's report for 2017 and the first half of 2018, the foundation's income amounted to approximately 3.1 million rubles, of which 2.5 million rubles were private donations, 40 thousand rubles were targeted donations to St. Petersburg, 424 thousand rubles were a loan from the founders, 63 thousand rubles were received from book sales and 37 thousand rubles from the sale of products with "Projects" symbols. In total, "Urban Projects" received 2619 donations with an average amount of 952 rubles.

The executive director of the foundation from December 2017 to April 2018 was Pyotr Ivanov.

== Activities in Moscow ==
Before the launch of each project, field research is conducted with the participation of volunteers: pedestrian traffic is studied, pedestrian actions are studied. Data from studies by prominent urbanists are used: Jan Gehl, Vukan Vuchic and others.

To study European cities, as well as to find an architect who would advise initiatives in Shchukino, Varlamov and Katz went on an expedition across Europe. Maxim Katz claimed that the Moscow mayor's office would sponsor the trip, but the information center of the government denied this information about financial support. According to Georgy Prokopov, deputy head of the center, the agreement only concerned the information support of the expedition.

During the expedition, special attention was paid to pedestrian and bicycle infrastructure, the organization of comfortable public transport, as well as details of street improvement. Based on the results of the trip, video reports were published.

=== Improving the Shchukino District ===
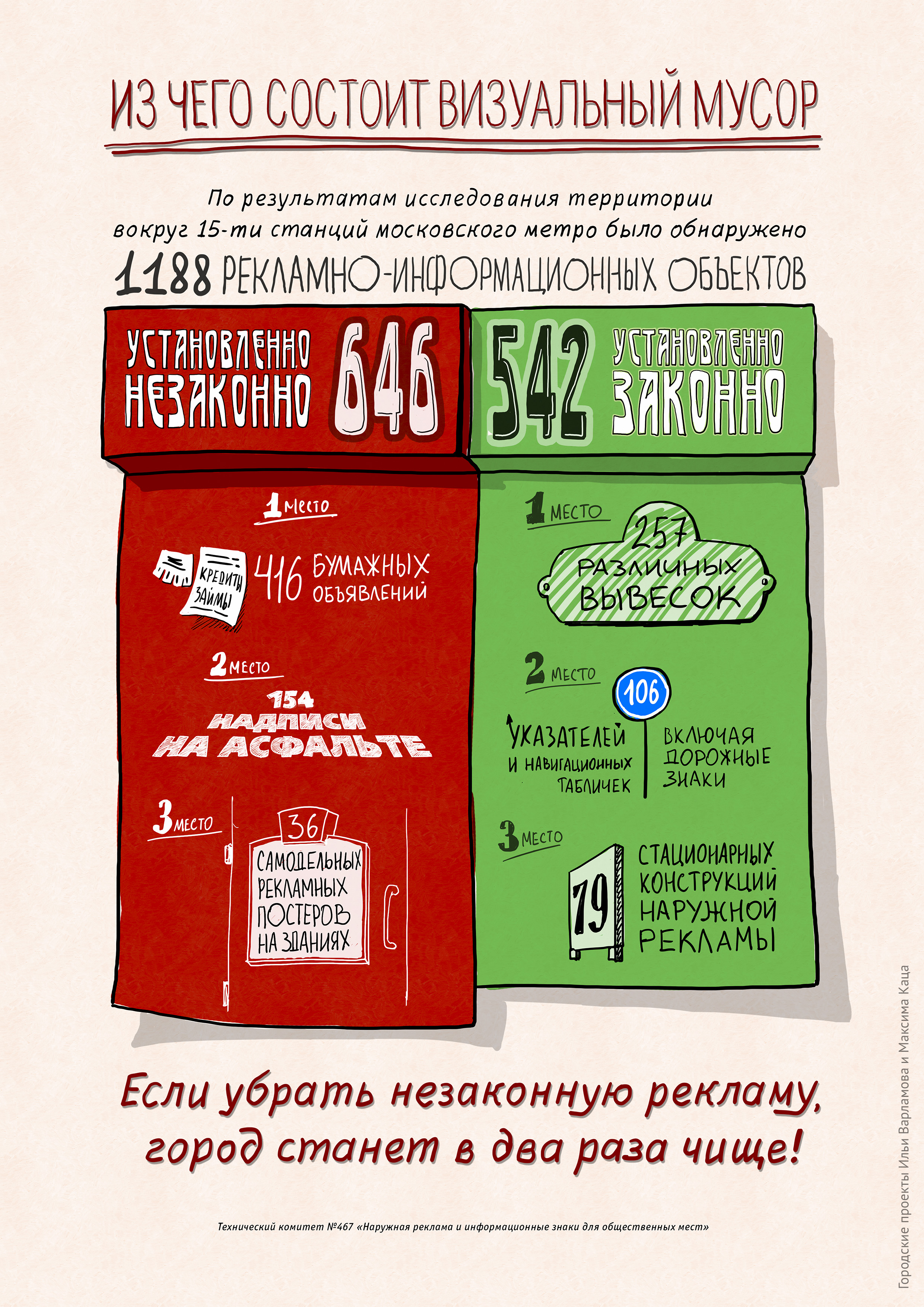
Poster dedicated to visual clutter

The foundation's first studies were conducted in the Shchukino district. Data on people's activity in the area allowed the municipal assembly to be persuaded to purchase 500 street benches. While conducting research in the Shchukino district, the foundation's volunteers discovered a problem in the arrangement of pedestrian routes and crossings. Up to 700 people crossed the road at the same point on Shchukinskaya Street every day. The collected information persuaded local authorities to paint a "zebra" at this point.

Another direction in the improvement of the district was the fight against illegal advertising. By putting pressure on local authorities and the illegal advertisers themselves, the amount of visual clutter was reduced.

Maxim Katz repeatedly emphasized the need to improve street infrastructure:

— If three hundred working people live in a house, and one homeless person hangs out in the yard, then all three hundred residents get the impression that there are only homeless people in the yards. Because the homeless person spends twenty-four hours a day on the street, and working people spend five minutes a day. It is necessary to create a comfortable street infrastructure to bring normal people out onto the street: street cafes, roller rinks, benches, tables, free Wi-Fi, an outdoor cinema.

— Maxim Katz

To achieve the same goals as part of "Urban Projects," a project for a recreation area on Marshal Vasilevsky Street was developed for Shchukino. Studies by the foundation's volunteers showed that there was a demand for the development of this area for leisure activities. The project involves designing the space in the form of benches descending in an amphitheater, changing the lawn cover, combining kiosks into a common trading zone, installing tables and a canopy to provide shelter from the rain. It is reported that the initiative is supported by the prefecture of the North-Western District.

=== Prohibition of parking on sidewalks on Tverskaya Street ===
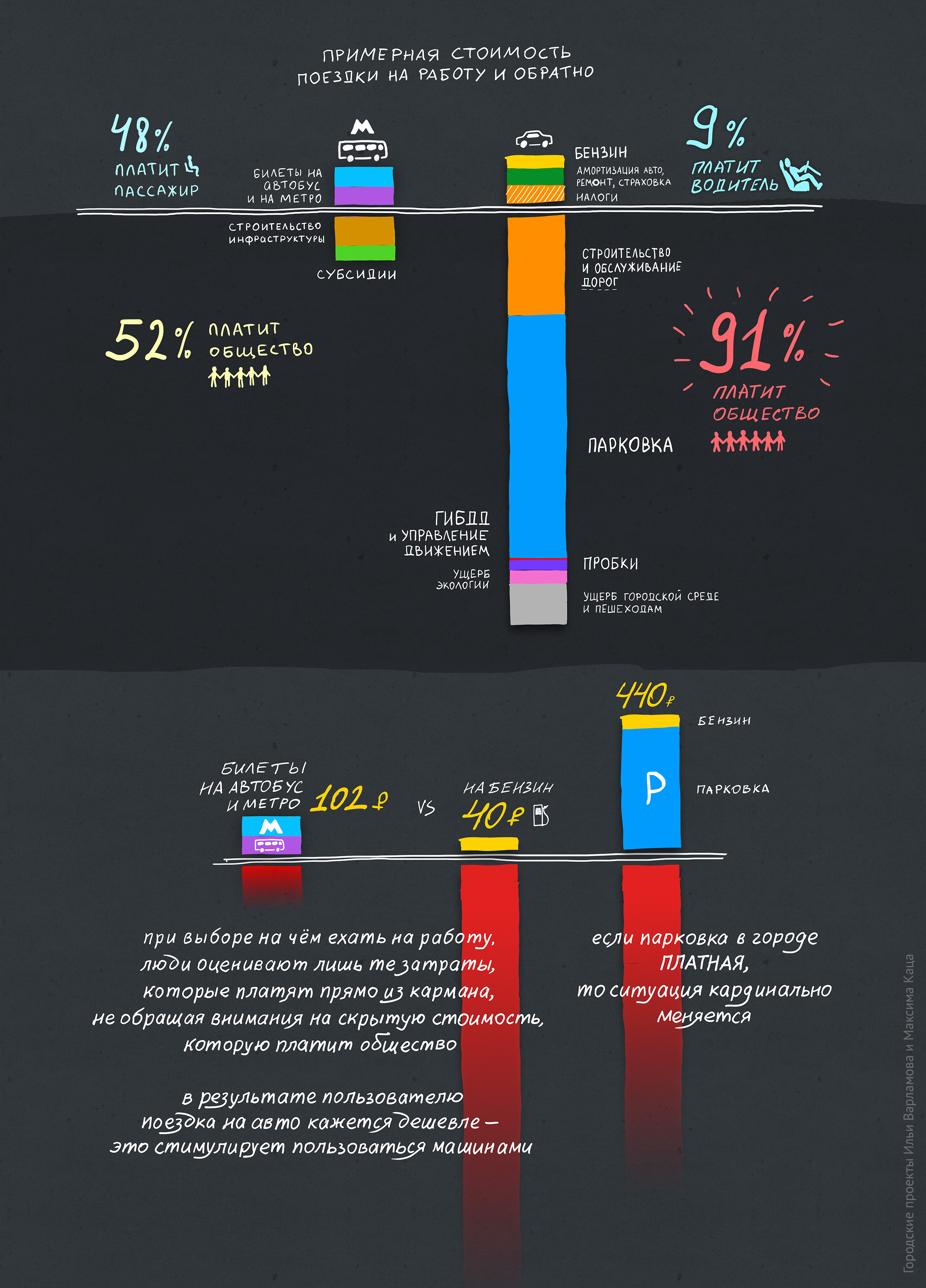
Infographics from the "Cities for People" exhibition

The "Urban Projects" foundation actively advocates for the prohibition of parking on sidewalks, the development of public transport, bicycle and pedestrian infrastructure instead of expanding car roads.

Even before the launch of "Urban Projects," Maxim Katz published his assessment of the allocation of space on Tverskaya Street between pedestrians and motorists: motorists account for 1% of sidewalk users, while they occupy 67% of the space. With the foundation of the foundation, it became possible to conduct a more detailed study of the situation on Tverskaya. Its results were published in the blogs of Ilya Varlamov and Maxim Katz.

On October 12, 2012, parking markings on sidewalks were erased on Tverskaya Street, and parked cars began to be towed by tow trucks. According to Anton Buslov, co-chairman of the interregional public organization "City and Transport", this decision was made after the authorities became familiar with the "Urban Projects" report.

Maxim Katz describes the decision-making process by the mayor's office as follows:

We did a detailed study of how many cars are usually parked there and how many pedestrians walk. We published these figures, which I gave to the Deputy Mayor for Transport Maxim Liksutov. I told him, "How about removing all this, because we are going to print 20 thousand leaflets and distribute them on the streets. Then people will demand, and you will remove it anyway." He made a presentation to Sobyanin on "Transport Hour" based on these materials. The next night, all parking lots from Pushkinskaya to Manezhnaya were erased from the sidewalks.

— Maxim Katz

A subsequent survey of Muscovites revealed approval of the ban on parking on sidewalks: almost 75% of respondents "negatively" and "rather negatively" assess permitted parking on sidewalks, and only 13% gave a "positive" and "rather positive" assessment. In addition, 76% of survey participants supported the city government's decision to eliminate parking on Tverskaya.

=== Ashtrays on Tverskaya ===
Volunteers of "Urban Projects" conducted a study of the behavior of smokers on Tverskaya. Here, as in other foundation studies, Jan Gehl's methodology was used. On Tverskaya Street, 8 points were chosen, at each of which, for 15 minutes of each hour, the number of smokers, the number of cigarette butts thrown on the asphalt, and the number of cigarette butts thrown into the trash can were counted.

Simultaneously with the research, the preparation of a project for the installation of ashtrays was launched. The design of ashtrays attached to poles was developed by Artemy Lebedev Studio. Varlamov stated that "Urban Projects" would install the ashtrays without the knowledge of the authorities.

The initiative is similar to the campaign of the non-profit organization to reduce cigarette butts thrown on the streets: according to their experience, similar measures lead to a reduction in the number of cigarette butts by an average of 54%. However, government officials reacted negatively to the initiative, calling it a PR stunt, and also reported that the unauthorized installation of ashtrays is prohibited due to safety concerns.

=== Cities for People exhibition ===
From November 17 to 26, 2012, the State Museum of Architecture named after A. V. Shchusev hosted the "Cities for People" exhibition of urban projects. It presented the results of research conducted by "Urban Projects". The exhibition stands highlighted the main problems of the city and demonstrated ways to improve the urban environment.

A number of lectures and discussions were held for visitors to the exhibition. They were attended by urban environment experts, Moscow officials, and participants of opposition organizations. Among the speakers were the chief architect of Moscow Sergey Kuznetsov, project coordinator of RosZHKH Dmitry Levenets, general director of Mosgortrans Peter Ivanov and others.

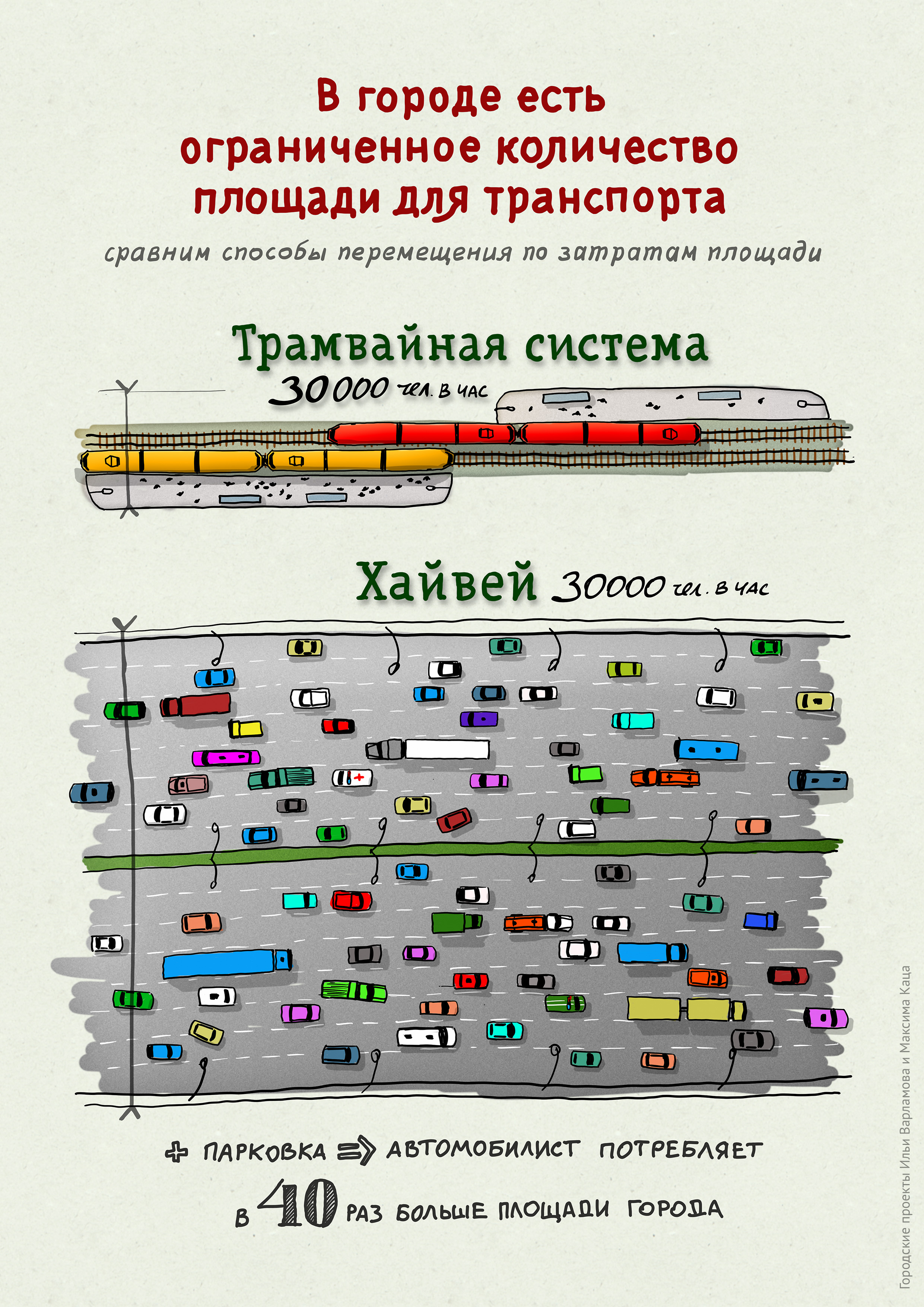
About the advantage of public transport – poster from the "Cities for People" exhibition

Museum director Irina Korobyina described the exhibition as a new stage in the life of the museum space and a pilot project for building a discussion platform within the museum.

=== Metro map ===
The Moscow Department of Transport, together with "Urban Projects", announced a competition for the creation of a new Moscow Metro map, which was to appear in carriages in 2013. The fund compiled a document containing requirements for the new map. In particular, for the first time, the map was to include several options: a compact one, intended for carriages, and a more complete one, placed at stations. Special attention in the scheme was paid to informing about other trunk transport modes and transfers to them. The requirements also included the presence of QR-codes for the Metro website, indication of the location of park-and-ride lots and special markings of stations adapted for people with disabilities.

The selection of works was carried out by a competition commission formed by the fund. Among its members were the head of the design development group Yandex.Maps Andrey Karmatsky, German rail transport specialist Robert Schwandl, advisor to the head of the Moscow Department of Transport Alexei Mityayev and others. In January 2013, online voting was held on the Department of Transport's website, the winner of which was the project of Artemy Lebedev's studio.

=== Rally on Triumphalnaya Square ===
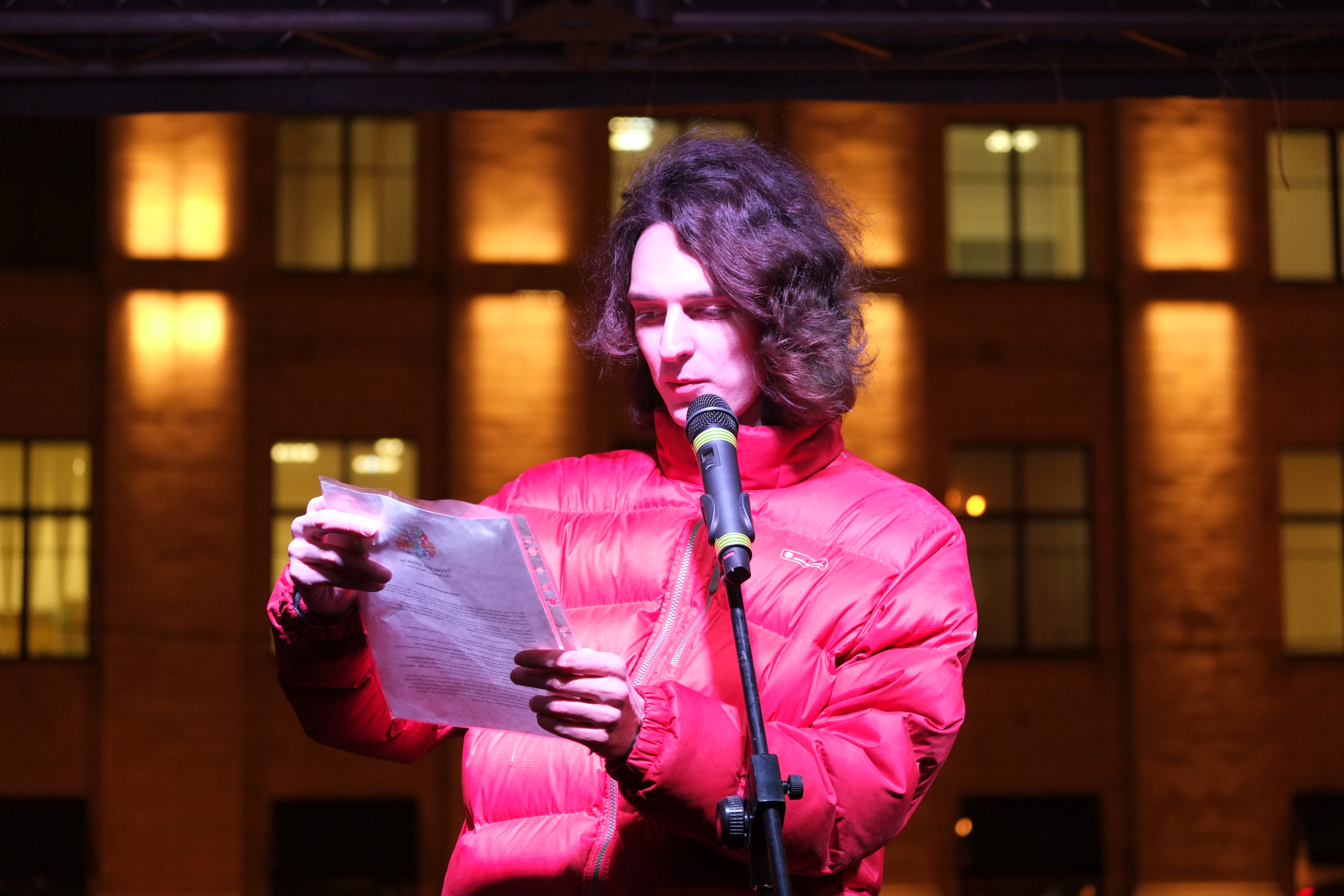
Maxim Katz reads the resolution of the rally against the reconstruction of Triumphalnaya Square

"Urban Projects" prepared and held a rally against the reconstruction of Triumphalnaya Square. The rally took place on Triumphalnaya Square itself on November 28, 2013, and gathered, according to various estimates, from 70 to 198 people. The rally participants spoke out against the reconstruction project, which involved attracting a contractor based on a tender where the main criteria were the cost and timing of the work, without holding a corresponding professional architectural competition. In addition to Maxim Katz and Ilya Varlamov, Moscow historian Alexander Usoltsev also spoke at the rally. Subsequently, the Moscow authorities decided to cancel the results of the already held tender and hold an architectural competition.

=== Campaign to protect the trolleybus ===
In the spring of 2016, "Urban Projects" organized a campaign to protect trolleybuses in Moscow. Over several months, more than 17,000 signatures were collected in support of a convenient and environmentally friendly mode of transport, the signatures were printed out and taken to the Moscow mayor's office. The campaign raised over 2.5 million rubles in donations to advertise on the radio and distribute newspapers on the streets and public transport, and many media outlets wrote about the initiative in a positive light. However, to this day, none of the promises of the Department of Transport have been fulfilled, and the trolleybus in Moscow was destroyed in 2020.

=== Traffic accident map ===
In 2020, Urban Projects joined the team of the non-profit project Карта ДТП (Traffic Accident Map in Russian), which visualizes accident hotspots on an online map based on Open Data published by the State Traffic Inspectorate.

=== Publishing the book "100 tips for the mayor of your city" ===
In March 2020, "Urban Projects" published the book "100 Tips for the Mayor of Your City", which contains recommendations for developing cities and improving the lives of city dwellers. Funds for the publication of the book, more than two million rubles, were raised through crowdfunding. The fund opened the website "Educate the Official", where you can buy books and send them to officials from Russian regions.

=== Tramway project on the Garden Ring ===
Urban Projects developed a tram route on the Garden Ring, which historically ran there. According to the plan, the tram line should be located in the center of the carriageway, which will increase the street's capacity from the current 1.57 thousand to 15 thousand people per hour.

=== Better renovation using the example of the Zyuzino district ===
In February 2021, together with the urban project center "Shtab" and the Zyuzino Headquarters, the fund prepared an alternative renovation project for the Moscow district of Zyuzino. Its implementation will allow the district park to be preserved and the mainly low-rise buildings to be preserved.

=== Bringing the Neglinnaya River back to the surface ===
In March 2021, a project to bring the channel of the Neglinnaya River back to the surface (currently the channel is removed into pipes) was published on the foundation's website. According to one of the foundation's founders, Ilya Varlamov, bringing the river back from underground collectors can change the appearance and functionality of the historical center of Moscow and attract more tourists to the capital. As an example of such a successful project, Varlamov cites the city of Seoul, where the channel of the Cheonggyecheon River was returned to the surface, which had been running in pipes under a highway for 30 years.

== Activities in other regions ==
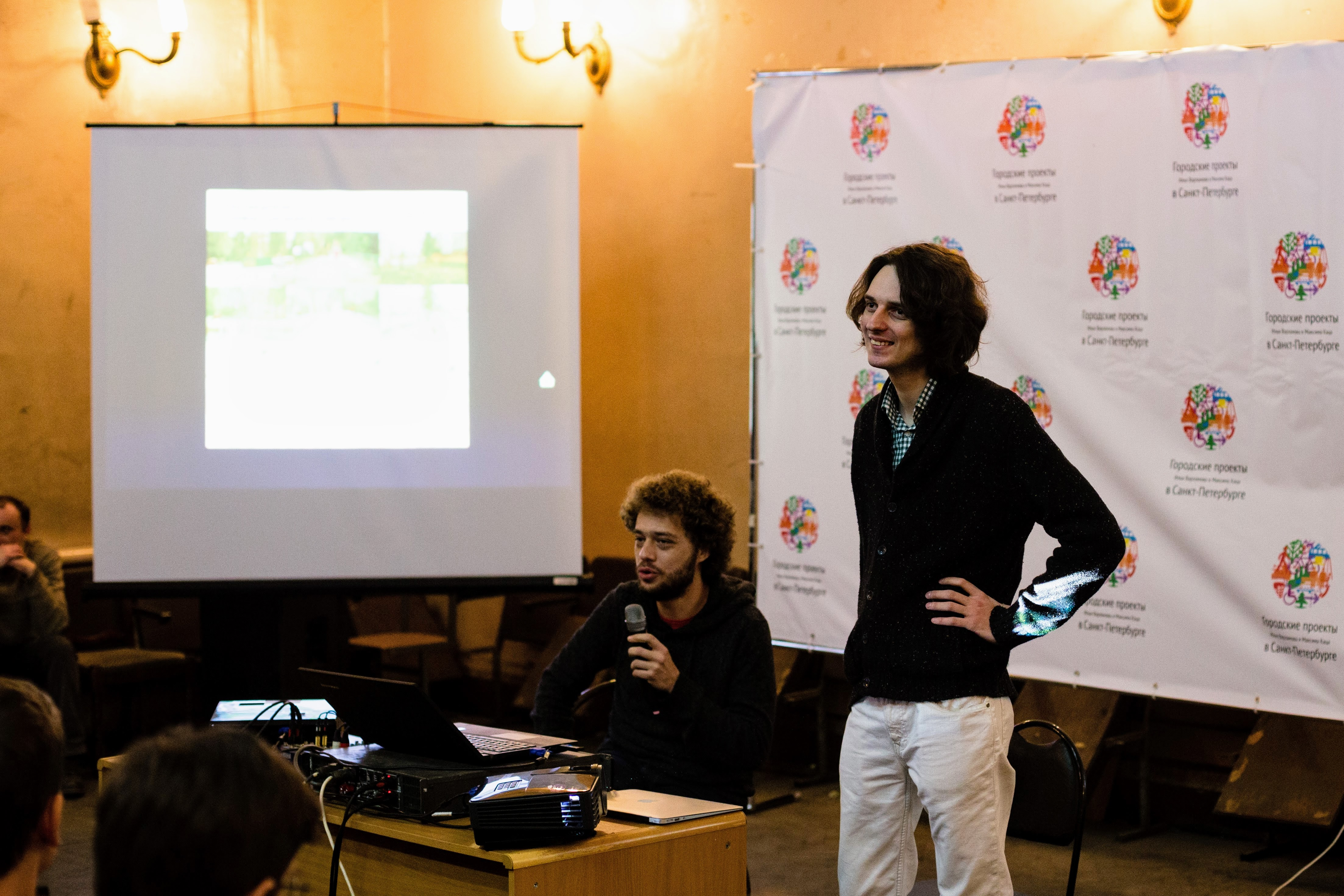
Maxim Katz and Ilya Varlamov at the opening ceremony of the Urban Projects branch in Saint Petersburg, 2014

Although the activities of the "Urban Projects" fund are focused in Moscow, its creators stated at the very beginning of their work that they are ready to provide legal and informational support to ready regional projects. Thus, at the end of 2014, the Syktyvkar activist Pavel Safronov founded a branch of the fund in Saint Petersburg.

=== Federal network ===
In 2020, the fund opened a network of regional branches in the capitals of the constituent entities of the Russian Federation and in a few months gathered more than ten thousand supporters, elections for the head were held in each regional branch. Over the year, the fund's offices opened in 100 cities of the country, the number of supporters reached 20 thousand people.

On March 4, 2022, the work of all branches was suspended indefinitely. By the time the branches were suspended, the number of supporters of the fund reached more than 30 thousand people, almost 4 thousand of them from Moscow.

=== Concept of the development of the "Zarosli" park in Saint Petersburg ===
Instead of the planned construction of a highway by the Saint Petersburg authorities on the site of a wasteland on Makarova Embankment on Vasilievsky Island, the Saint Petersburg branch of "Urban Projects" proposed to create a new city park "Zarosli". More than 4,000 signatures were collected for the creation of the park, and transport modeling showed that building a road could even worsen the traffic situation.

=== Research and implemented proposals ===
In March 2021, supporters of the fund conducted a study of Sedova Street in Irkutsk, based on the results of which a regulated pedestrian crossing was equipped near the Music Theatre, which reduced the number of violations of traffic rules by pedestrians.

In Tyumen, about 100 curbs were lowered after supporters of the fund reported to the city administrations about their non-compliance with height standards.

The fund's branch in Yekaterinburg studied car parking on Malysheva Street and found that several improperly parked cars interfere with about 6,500 people every day. A day after the information from the study was published in the media, the sidewalk was cordoned off with concrete hemispheres that did not allow parking. At the end of 2021, the city authorities agreed to cordon off six more bus stops in the city with bollards.

=== Regional campaigns in support of electric transport ===
In July 2020, Bryansk supporters of the fund collected signatures in support of the purchase of new trolleybus rolling stock and against the planned changes to the route network. City officials refused to make changes, and in 2022 the renewal of the city's trolleybus fleet began.

In March 2021, after a campaign to defend the Kursk tram, the governor of the Kursk Oblast Roman Starovoyt instructed to begin design work on the reconstruction, repair and construction of tram infrastructure.

== Running election campaigns ==
=== 2013 — Moscow mayoral election ===
In 2013, the fund's director Maxim Katz served as the deputy head of the election headquarters of candidate Alexei Navalny. According to Katz, he was not the only one from the "Urban Projects" team who joined the headquarters: "We participated in Alexei Navalny's elections — it is clear that these were elections not about the city agenda, but about politics". At the end of the campaign, Katz left the headquarters due to a conflict with Navalny. According to Navalny, Katz opposed protests in case of defeat in the elections. According to another version, the reason was a conflict between Ekaterina Patyulina (as of 2022 — Katz's wife) and the head of the headquarters Leonid Volkov.

A characteristic feature of the campaign was the installation of more than 1000 so-called "cubes" — quick-assembly four-sided agitation stands, next to which agitation was carried out. According to the results of the campaign, Alexei Navalny lost in the first round with a result of 27.24%.

=== 2014 – Moscow City Duma elections ===
For the 2014 MCD elections, Urban Projects planned to create a headquarters to support independent candidates. However, this idea was not supported by other opposition forces. As a result, the fund's director Maxim Katz participated in the elections as a self-nominated candidate.

=== 2017 — Moscow municipal elections ===
In 2017, the fund's director Maxim Katz, together with Dmitry Gudkov, organized a headquarters to support independent candidates for municipal deputies, which became known as the "political Uber".

=== 2019 — Saint Petersburg municipal elections, MCD elections ===
In February 2019, Urban Projects announced its participation in the Saint Petersburg municipal elections and opened the "Headquarters for the Transformation of St. Petersburg". The project offered pre-design proposals for changing public spaces, embankments, courtyards, squares and streets of St. Petersburg, and also called on residents to participate in municipal elections.

Maxim Katz was appointed head of the headquarters of the "Yabloko" party, all candidates nominated at the call of "Urban Projects" ran in the elections from this party. 99 "Yabloko" candidates became deputies.

Simultaneously with the municipal elections in St. Petersburg, Urban Projects conducted two election campaigns for the Moscow City Duma: Daria Besedina (district No. 8) and Anastasia Bryukhanova (district No. 42). Maxim Katz announced the start of the campaign in the MCD on February 17, 2019, the goal was stated as promoting the agenda of dismantling high-speed highways built in Moscow (district No. 8 is crossed by one of these highways — Leningradsky Prospekt). Besedina, who became a deputy of the MCD VII convocation on September 8, 2019, nominated from the "Yabloko" party and conducted a large-scale election campaign, which took place against the backdrop of political protests around the Moscow City Duma elections.

=== 2020 — elections to regional City Dumas ===
In 2020, Urban Projects supported 63 candidates with pro-urbanistic views in the elections to the City Dumas of various regions of the Russian Federation. Seven supported candidates became deputies.

=== 2021 — State Duma elections and MCD elections ===
In 2021, Urban Projects ran two election campaigns: as a candidate for deputy of the State Duma, the fund's employee Anastasia Bryukhanova ran, in the by-elections of candidates for the Moscow City Duma, Pyotr Karmanov participated. The elections were marked by the first use of the remote electronic voting system. Bryukhanova's headquarters staff claims that the use of REG was the reason for the defeat in the elections, as the results of REG and the results of offline voting in ballot boxes differed significantly, statistical anomalies are also reported.

=== 2022 — Moscow municipal elections ===
In 2021, Urban Projects announced a campaign to support independent candidates for municipal deputies of the city of Moscow, similar to the "United Democrats" project in 2017.

== Links ==
- «City Projects»
- «City Projects» on YouTube
