= Panfilovskaya =

Station on the Moscow Central Circle

Panfilovskaya Панфиловская
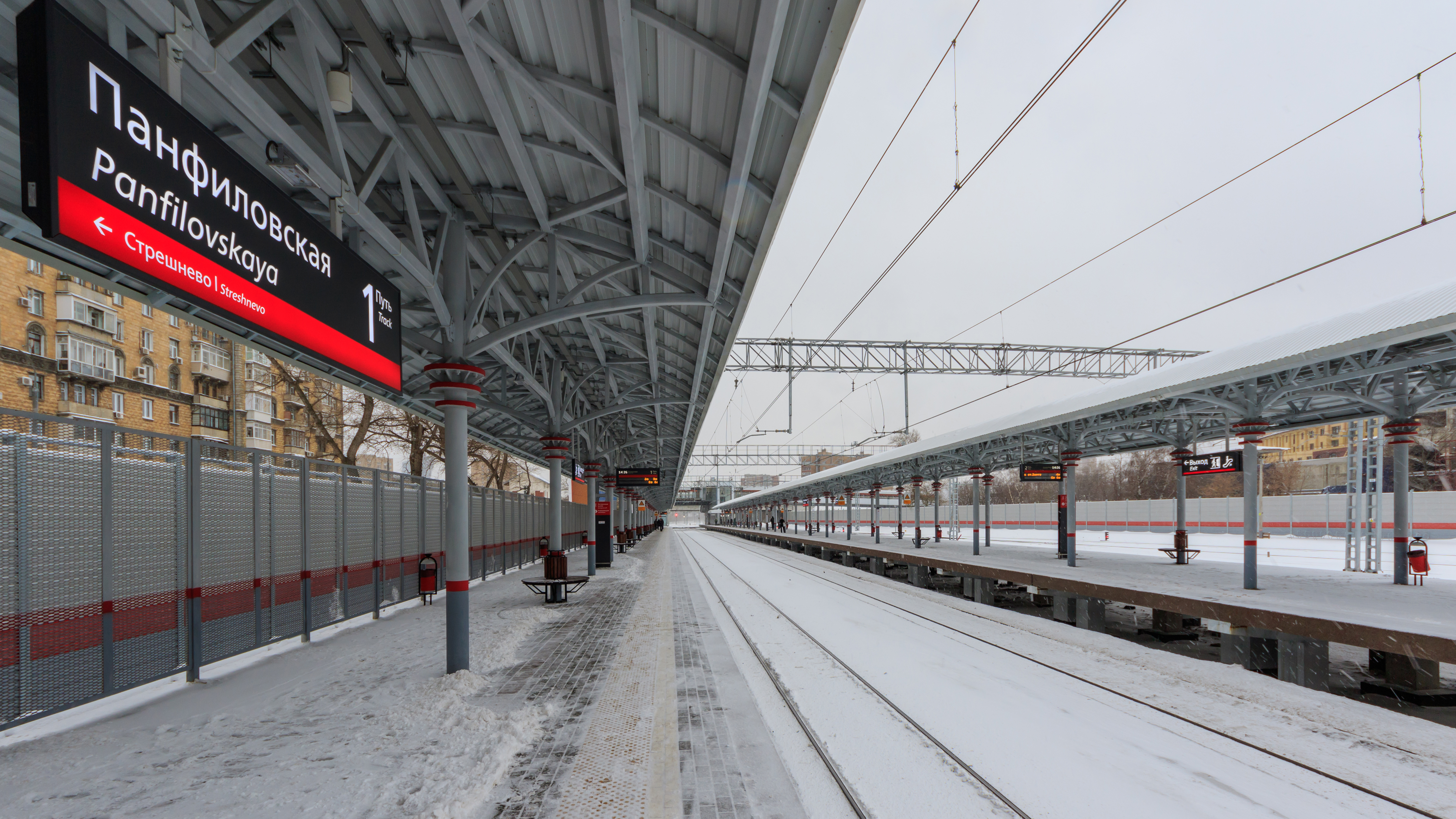

General information
- Location: Sokol District, Shchukino District, Northern Administrative Okrug
- Coordinates: 55.7991°N 37.4988°E
- System: Moscow Metro
- Line: Moscow Central Circle
- Platforms: 2 side platforms
- Tracks: 3

History
- Opened: 8 November 2016; 9 years ago

Services
Preceding station	Moscow Metro	Following station
Zorge anticlockwise / outer	Moscow Central Circle	Streshnevo clockwise / inner
Out-of-station interchange
Shchukinskaya towards Planernaya	Tagansko-Krasnopresnenskaya line transfer at Oktyabrskoye Pole	Polezhayevskaya towards Kotelniki
Route map
Location
- Location within Moscow Metro

Panfilovskaya (Russian: Панфиловская) is a station on the Moscow Central Circle of the Moscow Metro. The station opened in November 2016 and was the 31st and final station to open on the line.

The station is named for the street on which it is situated, Ulitsa Panfilova. Ulitsa Panfilova is named for Ivan Panfilov, a Soviet general at the Battle of Moscow in World War II. During construction, the station's name was slated to be Khodynka; however, prior to the line's opening, the city changed the name, citing resident requests.

Panfilovskaya offers out-of-station transfers to Oktyabrskoye Pole on the Tagansko-Krasnopresnenskaya Line, 700 metres (2,300 ft) away.
