= Maxim Katz =

Israeli-Russian political and public figure (born 1984)

- Максим Кац
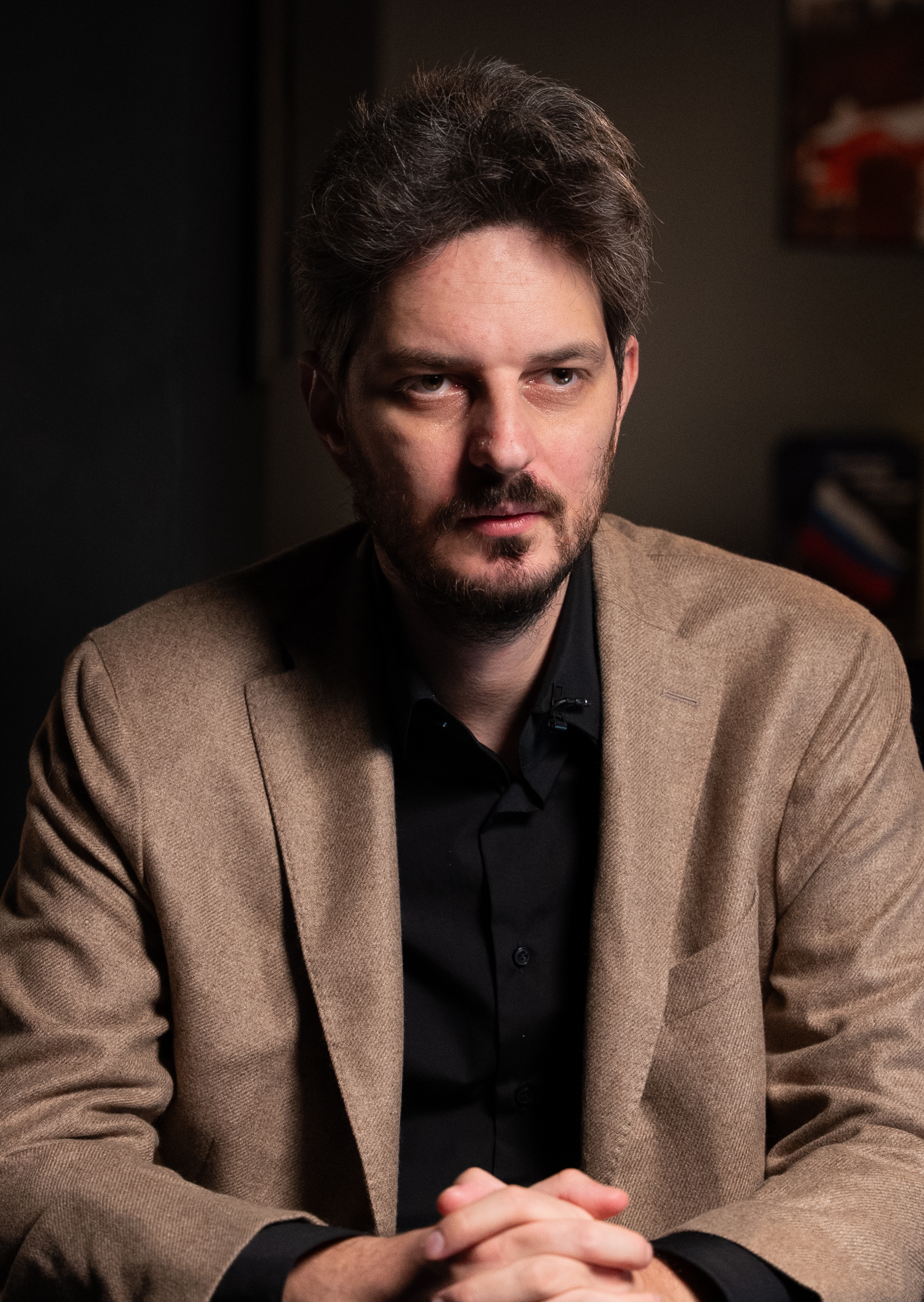
- Katz in 2023

Member of the Russian Opposition Coordination Council
- In office 22 October 2012 – 27 May 2013

Member of the municipal assembly of the Shchukino district of Moscow
- In office 4 March 2012 – 18 September 2016

Personal details
- Born: 23 December 1984 (age 41) Moscow, Russian SFSR, Soviet Union (now Russia)
- Party: Yabloko (2016–2020)
- Spouse: Ekaterina Patyulina (since 2020)
- Children: 2
- Education: University of Glasgow, Tel Aviv University
- Occupation: Politician, activist, businessperson
- Maxim Katz's voice Recorded 14 April 2014

Maxim Yevgenyevich Katz (Note: Also romanized as Maksim and Kats) (Russian: Максим Евгеньевич Кац; born 23 December 1984) is a Russian political opposition figure, urban planning activist, election campaign strategist, and popular YouTuber hosting his own daily political show.

Katz rose to prominence in 2011 when he launched a successful campaign for a municipal assembly seat in Moscow. Between 2012 and 2016, he served as a legislative representative for the district of Shchukino. In 2012, Katz was elected to the Russian Opposition Coordination Council, serving there until 2013. Katz is known for his work as an opposition campaign strategist, having served as campaign chief or their deputy for elections of Alexei Navalny (2013), Dmitry Gudkov (2016), Darya Besedina (2019), and Anastasia Bryukhanova (2019, 2021).

In 2012, Katz and Ilya Varlamov co-founded the City Projects Foundation, an organization that focuses on improving the quality of life in Russian cities.

Katz's eponymous YouTube channel, launched in 2010, features daily political commentary and has amassed a following of over 2.3 million subscribers and more than 1 billion views.

In August 2023 Katz was sentenced to 8 years in absentia on politically motivated charges in Russia for allegedly spreading "false information" about the Russian full-scale war against Ukraine, specifically the Bucha Massacre. In March 2026 he was found guilty of violating Russia's "foreign agent" law and sentenced to additional 1 year in absentia.

== Biography ==
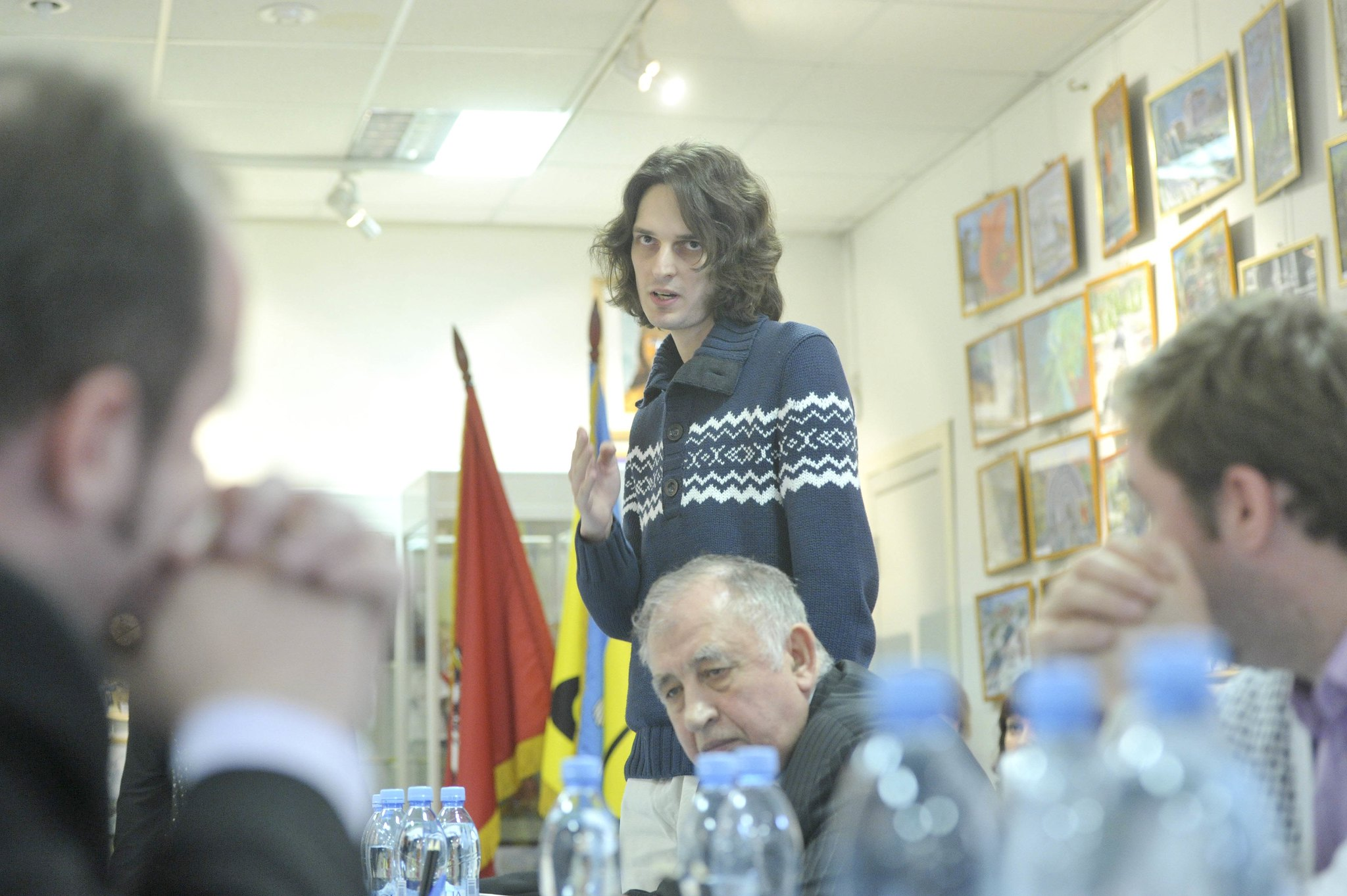
Maxim Katz (standing) in 2012

Katz was born in Moscow, Russia to a Jewish father and an ethnically Russian mother. In 1993, he emigrated to Israel with his family. He returned to Russia in 2001. He is an atheist.

In his 20's Katz was a professional poker player. In 2007, he became the first Russian champion in sports poker.

In 2012, Katz was elected as a municipal deputy of the Moscow district of Shchukino.

He and Ilya Varlamov launched the urban development foundation “City Projects” the same year. Katz worked as its director until the NGO's work was suspended in 2022.

In 2016, Katz was one of thirteen Russians to receive the UK government's Chevening Scholarship, which sponsors students with leadership potential to study at a British university. Through this scholarship, Katz studied at the University of Glasgow, completing a Master's program in "Public and Urban Policy" in 2017. In May 2024, Katz received his second master's degree from Tel Aviv University, completing a program "Leadership in education".

In early 2022, Katz declared his opposition to the Russian invasion of Ukraine and subsequently fled to Israel. On 22 July 2022, the Russian Ministry of Justice designated Katz as a "foreign agent." On 5 December 2022, he was fined in absentia for violating Russia's "foreign agent" legislation. He became the first natural person to be fined under the corresponding provision of the Code of Administrative Offenses.

He was subsequently placed on a federal wanted list on 29 October. On 23 March, Katz was arrested in absentia by the Basmanny District Court on charges of spreading "false information" about the Russian Armed Forces for covering the Bucha massacre, facing up to 10 years in prison. On 23 August, the prosecutors requested a 10-year prison term with a 5 year ban on "administering websites" after release. This marked the first instance where the prosecution sought the maximum sentence permissible under the statute. On 24 August, he was given an 8-year sentence with a 4 year ban on "administering websites" in absentia. His sentence was upheld in absentia by a Moscow City Court on 16 April 2024. On 24 September 2025 he was arrested in absentia by Khoroshevsky District Court on charges of failing to follow Russia's "foreign agent" law. On 11 March 2026, the court found him guilty and increased his sentence to 9 years with a 6 year ban on "administering websites" in absentia.

== Political career ==
=== Urban activism ===
Katz's interest in urban planning began during his travels, leading him to study at the urban design firm of Jan Gehl in 2011.

In 2012 he and Ilya Varlamov co-founded the City Projects Foundation aimed at improving the urban environment through the use of modern urbanism data.

In 2020, the foundation opened a network of regional branches in the capitals of Russian federal subjects and in a few months gathered more than ten thousand supporters. Each regional branch held elections for its head. Within a year, the foundation's representative offices opened in 100 cities across the country, and the number of supporters reached 20,000.

On March 4, 2022, the activities of all branches were suspended indefinitely. By that time the foundation had had over 30,000 supporters, including almost 4,000 from Moscow.

=== Election campaigns ===
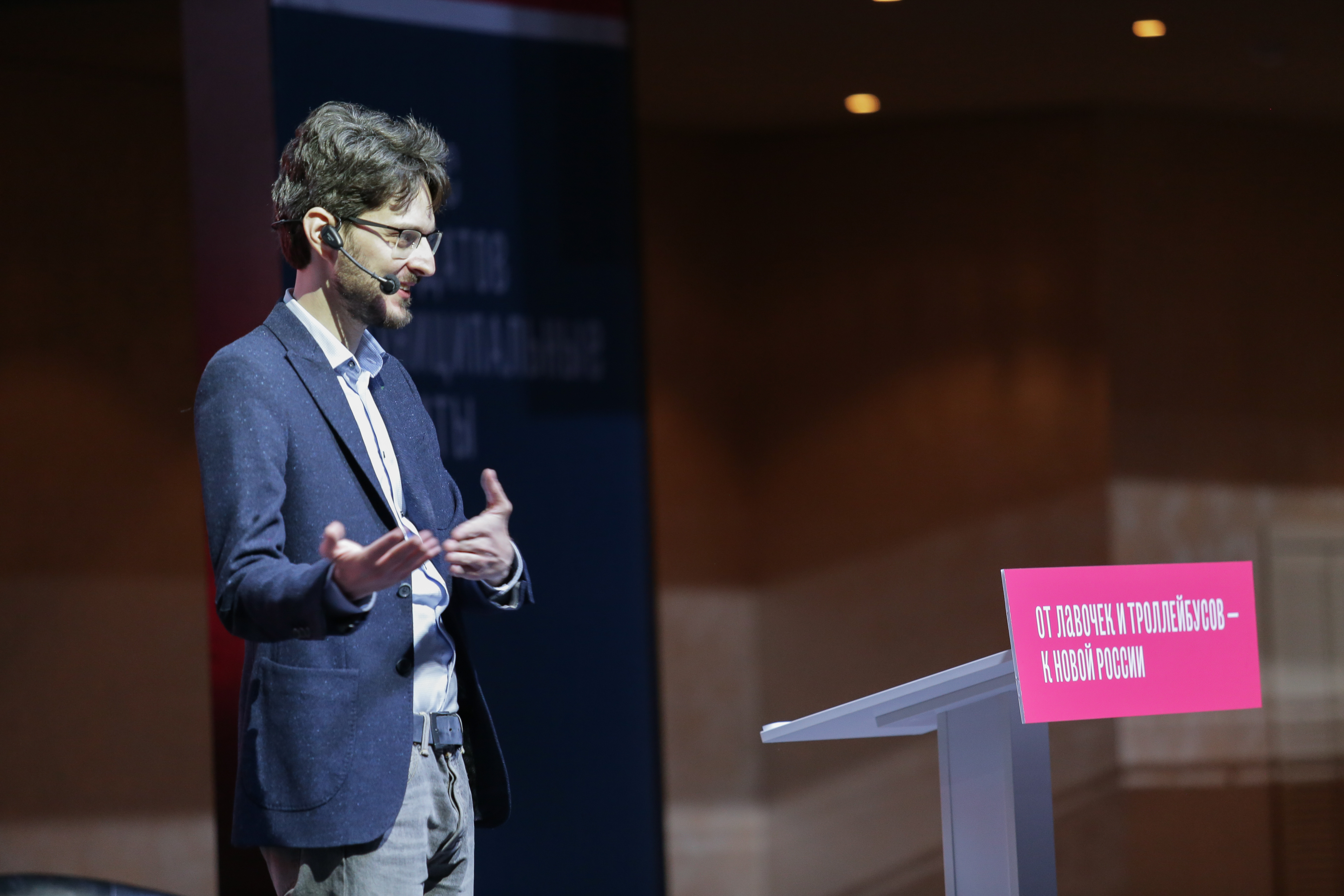
Maxim Katz at a congress of candidates for municipal deputies of the United Democrats project, 2017

If you are against Putin, we will help you

— Maxim Katz

Katz has managed numerous opposition political campaigns, including:

- 2012: As campaign manager for Ilya Varlamov's mayoral campaign in Omsk, Katz spearheaded a strategy that garnered significant attention but ultimately resulted in Varlamov withdrawing due to the impossibility of collecting the required number of signatures.
- 2013: Serving as the deputy campaign manager for Alexei Navalny's mayoral campaign in Moscow, Katz played a pivotal role in a campaign that garnered significant public support and unexpectedly received 27% of the vote, establishing Navalny as a leading opposition figure. This campaign employed innovative strategies and relied heavily on public donations and volunteer support.
- 2014: Katz ran for the Moscow City Duma, receiving 23% of the vote but failing to secure a seat.
- 2015: Katz served as campaign chief of the "Civic Initiative" party's campaign for elections to the Kaluga Regional Duma, led by Andrei Nechayev, Russia's first Minister of Economy who is now in opposition.
- 2016: As campaign manager for Dmitry Gudkov's campaign for the State Duma, Katz ran a campaign that, despite Gudkov's loss, won the prestigious "Pollie award" for its innovative use of digital platforms.
- 2017: Katz co-founded the United Democrats project (also known as Political Uber), designed to support independent candidates in the Moscow municipal elections. The project provided resources and training to candidates who opposed Vladimir Putin, leading to the election of 267 deputies. As a result, opposition candidates won the majority of seats in Moscow's central districts.
- 2019: Katz managed Darya Besedina's successful campaign for the Moscow City Duma. This campaign, notable for its significant fundraising success (over 18 million rubles), helped Besedina become one of the few opposition candidates to secure a seat in the Moscow City Duma.
- 2019: Also in 2019, Katz served as a chief of Yabloko party campaign for Saint-Petersburg municipal seats. As a result of the campaign, 99 people were elected deputies in 31 districts of the city, up from zero in the previous election.
- 2020: Varlamov and Katz's City Projects Foundation endorsed 63 pro-urbanist candidates for city council elections in various regions of Russia. Seven of these endorsed candidates won their elections.
- 2021: Katz served as campaign manager for Anastasia Bryukhanova's campaign for the State Duma. Сampaign was financed through fundraising, with over 20 million rubles raised for signature collection alone. Bryukhanova won the State Duma election according to paper ballots but lost due to the results of remote electronic voting.

== YouTube channel ==
Maxim Katz is the author and host of the eponymous YouTube channel. The channel features daily videos on current socio-political topics, particularly those refuting the claims of Russian propaganda. Before the beginning of the Russian invasion of Ukraine, videos gained 300-400 thousand views per day. After the invasion began, the number of views increased to 1-2 million. According to Katz, this is due to his coverage of events "as they are," without following the restrictions of Russian censorship.

From March 2, 2020, to August 11, 2024, the channel grew from 13,800 to 2,300,000 subscribers. The number of views is over 1.1 billion.

== Awards ==
In March 2021, Katz received the Global Belarusian Solidarity Award in the category "View from the outside" from the center for Belarusian Solidarity.
