= Anastasia Bryukhanova =

Russian politician (born 1993)

- Анастасия Брюханова
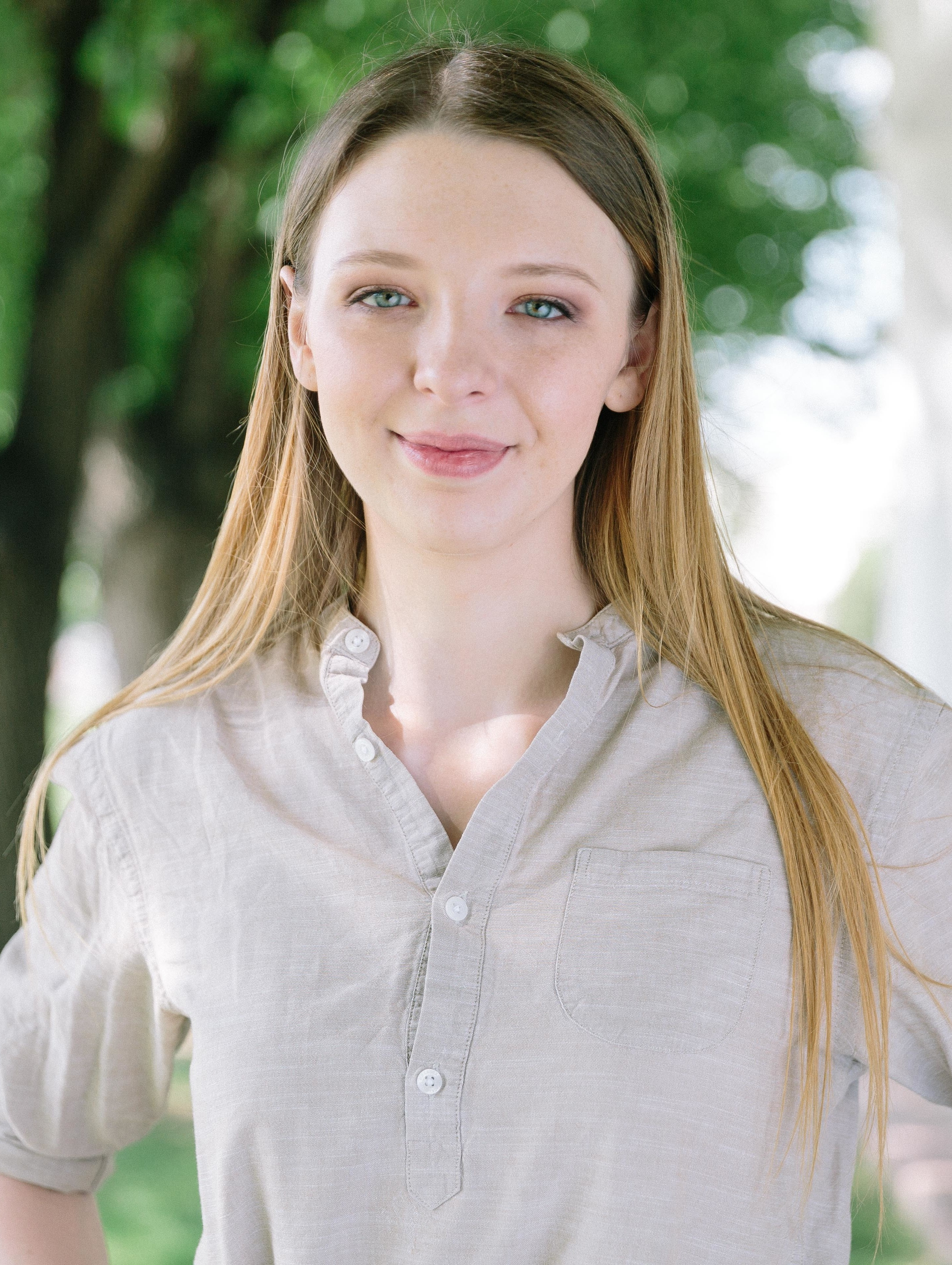
- Bryukhanova in 2019

Member of the Council of Deputies of Shchukino District of Moscow
- In office 2016–2021

Personal details
- Born: 1 September 1993 (age 33) Moscow, Russia
- Party: Yabloko (2016–2020)
- Occupation: Politician, activist

Anastasia Andreyevna Bryukhanova (born September 1, 1993) is a Russian opposition politician and public figure.

Bryukhanova is a former municipal deputy and ex-head of the commission for improvement and housing and communal services under the municipal council of the Shchukino district of Moscow, coordinator of the network of local branches of the non-profit foundation "City Projects", and author of the Obyektiv YouTube channel.

In 2019, she ran for the Moscow City Duma in the 7th convocation election, but was not registered to participate by the electoral commission. In 2021, she participated in the elections to the State Duma of the VIII convocation in the Leningradsky constituency in the north of Moscow.

== Biography ==
=== Early days ===
Bryukhanova was born on September 1, 1993. She studied at the Department of Industrial Economics of the Faculty of Engineering and Economics of the Moscow Aviation Institute, but dropped out after the fourth year.

In 2015, Bryukhanova took part in a political show on the TV channel Rain for young people who want to try themselves in politics - the project "President 2042". Bryukhanova is an employee of the "City Projects" foundation and heads the development of a federal network of branches. She adheres to opposition views and has spoken at opposition rallies.

=== Political career (2016-2021) ===
From 2016 to 2021, Bryukhanova was a member of the Council of Deputies of the Shchukino Municipal District of Moscow (she was elected as a candidate from the Yabloko party) and headed the Council's Committee on Improvement and Housing and Communal Services.

In 2019, she participated in the elections for deputies of the Moscow City Duma with the Yabloko party, but was denied registration because the election commission considered 21% of the signatures she had collected as invalid. She appealed the decision but on August 9, 2019, the CEC of Russia confirmed the decision of the election commission. In September 2019, she escalated the appeal to the Constitutional Court of Russia which sided by her on March 24, 2020, but it did not affect the results of the elections to the Moscow City Duma.

In 2020, she was expelled from the Yabloko party as part of a group of supporters of Maxim Katz. Since 2020, she has released videos on political and other socially significant topics on her YouTube channel "Anastasia Bryukhanova". Since April 26, 2022, the channel has regularly published videos with analytics of events, mainly related to the 2022 Russian invasion of Ukraine. In 2022, the channel was rebranded and renamed to Obyektiv. Anastasia Bryukhanova is a co-host of the channel, along with Ekaterina Voropay.

In May 2020, she became a candidate for the State Duma elections in 2021 in the single-mandate constituency No. 198 (covering the districts of the Northern Administrative Okrug, except Voykovsky, Golovinsky, Levoberezhny, Molzhaninovsky and Khovrino), with the support of the City Projects Foundation, the former Prime Minister of Russia, leader of the PARNAS party Mikhail Kasyanov, and Smart Voting". The congress of the Yabloko party, on the contrary, did not support Bryukhanova and nominated Marina Litvinovich in the same constituency. By August 2021, she had collected all the signatures, submitted them to the election commission and was registered as a candidate for deputy of the State Duma a few days later. More than 20 million rubles were spent on collecting signatures through fundraising. According to the Russian Field sociological center, as of September 13, 2021, Anastasia Bryukhanova was the most recognizable candidate for deputy in her constituency. Bryukhanova took second place, gaining 23.28% of the vote and losing to Galina Khovanskaya, who gained 28.78% of the vote. Her headquarters announced falsifications during the electronic voting (voting bots), described a scheme for stuffing ballots in electronic voting based on anomalies in the growth of support at certain intervals for candidates supported by Sergey Sobyanin, and reported that with the help of the re-voting procedure in Moscow, opposition candidates lost about 250,000 votes. Bryukhanova filed a lawsuit challenging the election results at the electronic polling station, but it was dismissed.

In December 2021, a group of members of the Yabloko party was expelled for supporting Anastasia Bryukhanova in the elections to the State Duma instead of Marina Litvinovich and created the Yabloko public movement, which aims to revive the Yabloko party on the basis of its original democratic, liberal and human rights principles. Bryukhanova became a member of the movement.

=== Asylum ===
After the start of the full-scale war against Ukraine, she left Russia for Georgia.

On April 12, 2023, she learned about the indictment against her for spreading so-called "false information" about the Russian military in a video retelling The New York Times investigation about Bucha massacre. Due to the extradition agreement between Russia and Georgia called "The Convention on Legal Assistance and Legal Relations in Civil, Family and Criminal Cases", she moved from Georgia to Germany. On June 15, 2023, she was put on the federal wanted list. On July 21, 2023, the Khoroshevsky District Court of Moscow arrested Bryukhanova in absentia.

On December 27, 2023, the Ministry of Internal Affairs of the Russian Federation put Bryukhanova on the international wanted list. On November 8, 2024, the state prosecutor requested an 8-year prison sentence with a 4 year ban on "administering websites" after release. The following day, the Khoroshevsky District Court of Moscow sentenced Bryukhanova in absentia to the term requested by the prosecutor's office.
