= Daria Besedina =

Russian politician

- Дарья Беседина
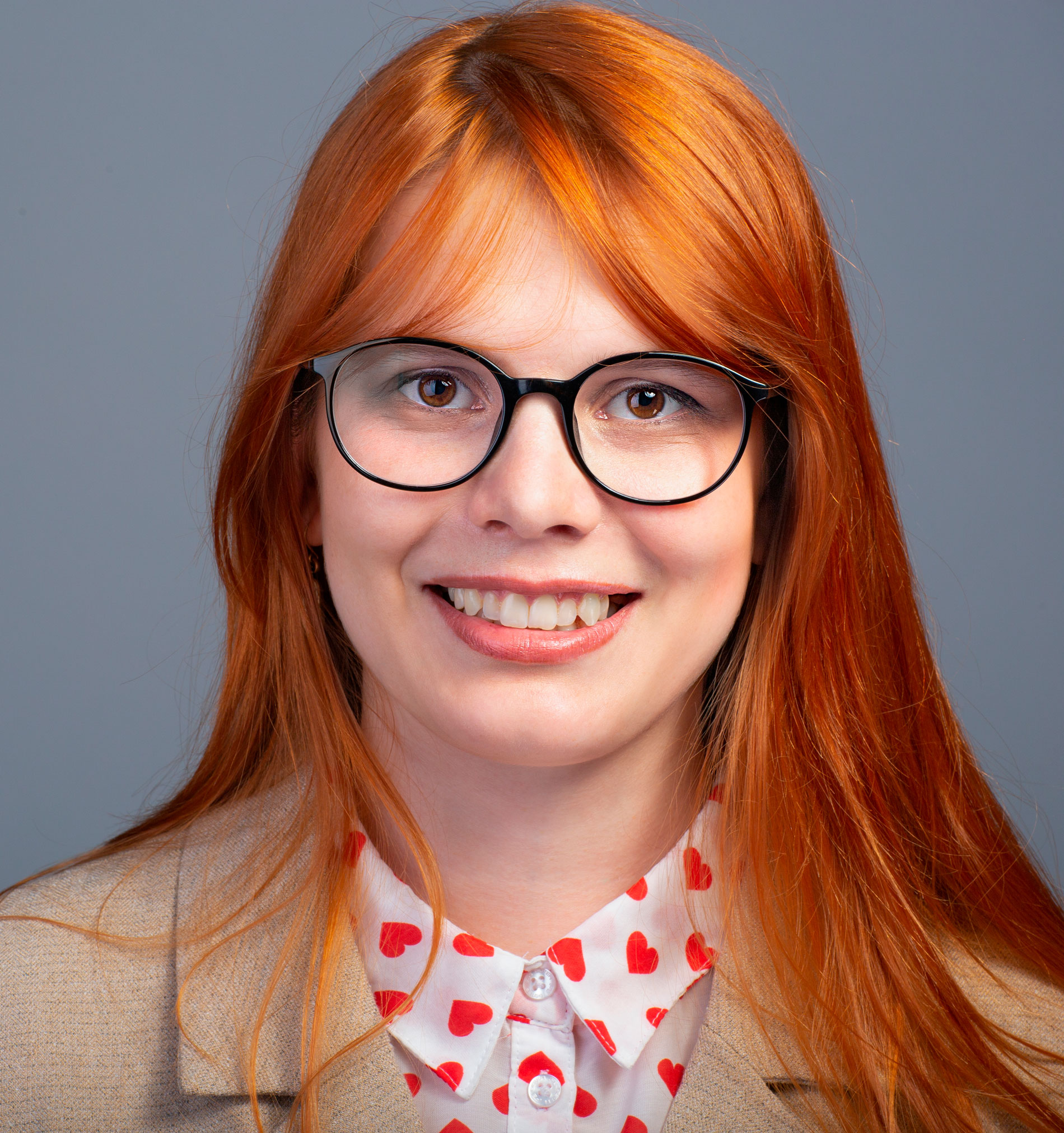
- Besedina in 2019

Member of the Moscow City Duma
- In office 8 September 2019 – 17 September 2024

Personal details
- Born: Daria Stanislavovna Besedina; 22 July 1988 (age 38) Khimki, Moscow Oblast, Russian SFSR, Soviet Union
- Party: Yabloko (2017—2021)
- Education: Moscow Architectural Institute (State Academy)
- Website: besedina.moscow

Daria Stanislavovna Besedina (Russian: Дарья Станиславовна Беседина; born July 22, 1988) is a Russian opposition politician, urbanist, deputy of the 7th Moscow City Duma, member of the Yabloko party from 2017 to 2021.

== Biography ==
Darya Besedina was born in Khimki in 1988. In Darya's childhood, her family moved frequently: her father, a physicist, worked in laboratories in Oxford and Hamburg. In 2004, the Besedins returned to Russia.

Besedina graduated from the Moscow Architectural Institute with a degree in Architecture. Before that, as a child, she lived for two years in Hamburg, where, according to her, she felt the difference between the quality of the urban environment in Russian and German cities. During her studies, Darya joined the non-profit organization "City Projects", which aims to improve the urban environment using data from modern urbanism. From the works of experts such as Jan Gehl and Vukan Vuchic, Besedina concluded that the modern rules by which Russian cities are designed lead to the creation of a poor-quality and inhumane urban environment.

In 2017, Darya joined the Yabloko party. She has worked on the staffs of several political campaigns since 2013, and in 2018 she herself participated in the party's primaries before the mayoral election, where she took fifth place out of 21.

On December 2, 2020, Darya married Mikhail Chizhov, but later divorced him.

On January 20, 2023, the Ministry of Justice of the Russian Federation added Daria Besedina to the register of "foreign agents", which, however, did not expel her from the Moscow Duma.

As of September 26, 2024, Daria Besedina resides in Germany and is engaged in studying tram systems.

== Political activity ==
In 2015, she was going to participate in the elections to the Legislative Assembly of the Kaluga Oblast with the help of the Civic Initiative party, but the local election commission refused to register the party's list.

=== Election to the Moscow City Duma ===
On February 17, 2019, Maxim Katz, director of the City Projects Foundation, announced the organization's participation in the elections to the Moscow City Duma in order to promote the agenda of dismantling high-speed highways built in Moscow. Daria Besedina was announced as a candidate from the organization, the campaign was planned in the 8th district, through which Leningradsky Avenue passes - a street converted into a multi-lane highway. Darya was also supported by the smart voting of Alexei Navalny.

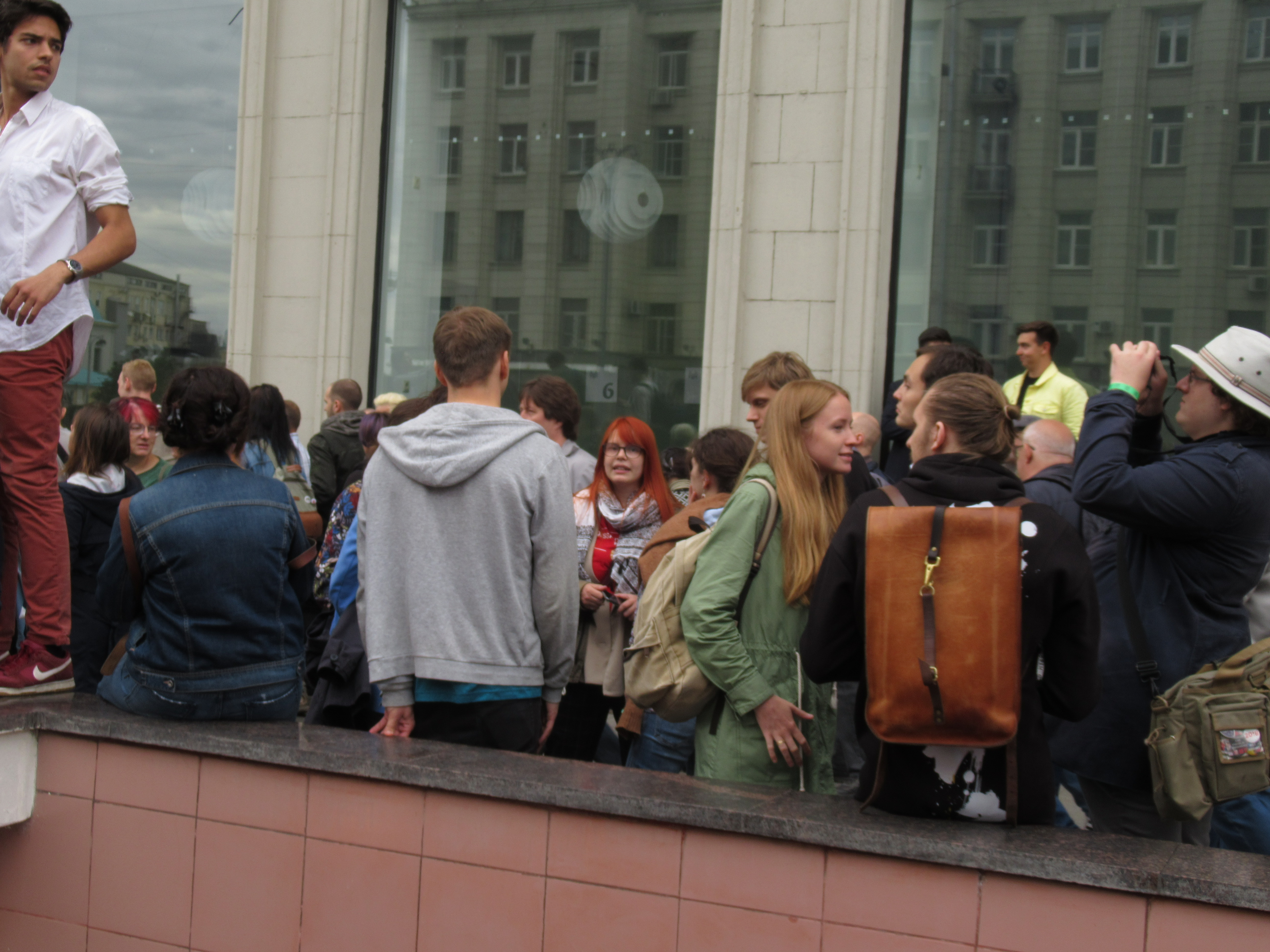
Meeting of candidate Besedina with voters July 14, 2019

Darya Besedina became one of the few registered candidates from the Yabloko party following the verification of signatures collected in her support. Despite being registered, Besedina took part in protests against the denial of other opposition candidates to run in the elections. On July 26, 2019, a night search was conducted in her parents' apartment as part of a case of pressure on the Moscow City Election Commission.

The main opponent of Daria Besedina in the 8th district was Vadim Kumin - a representative of the CPRF, who previously took second place in the mayoral elections in Moscow in 2018. Besedina's campaign was largely funded by money raised through public fundraising: 3,482 donations from individuals were received in the account, which amounted to 72% of the funds used for the campaign. In total, over 16 million rubles were received in the election fund.

As a result of the elections, Daria Besedina took 1st place and became a deputy.

Member of the Commissions on Education, on Environmental Policy, on Urban Economy and Housing Policy.

Place	Candidates for deputies	Party	Received percentage	Number received votes
1.	Daria Besedina	Yabloko	36.57 %	14911
2.	Vadim Kumin	CPRF	31.41 %	12805
3.	Olga Panina	A Just Russia	14.16 %	5774
4.	Ekaterina Kopeikina	United Russia	6.78 %	2765
5.	Vasily Vlasov	LDPR	5.28 %	2153
6.	Elena Lugovskaya	Party of Growth	3.07 %	1253

=== Activities in the Moscow City Duma ===
In the Moscow City Duma, she joined the Yabloko faction together with Yevgeny Bunimovich, Maxim Kruglov and Sergey Mitrokhin.

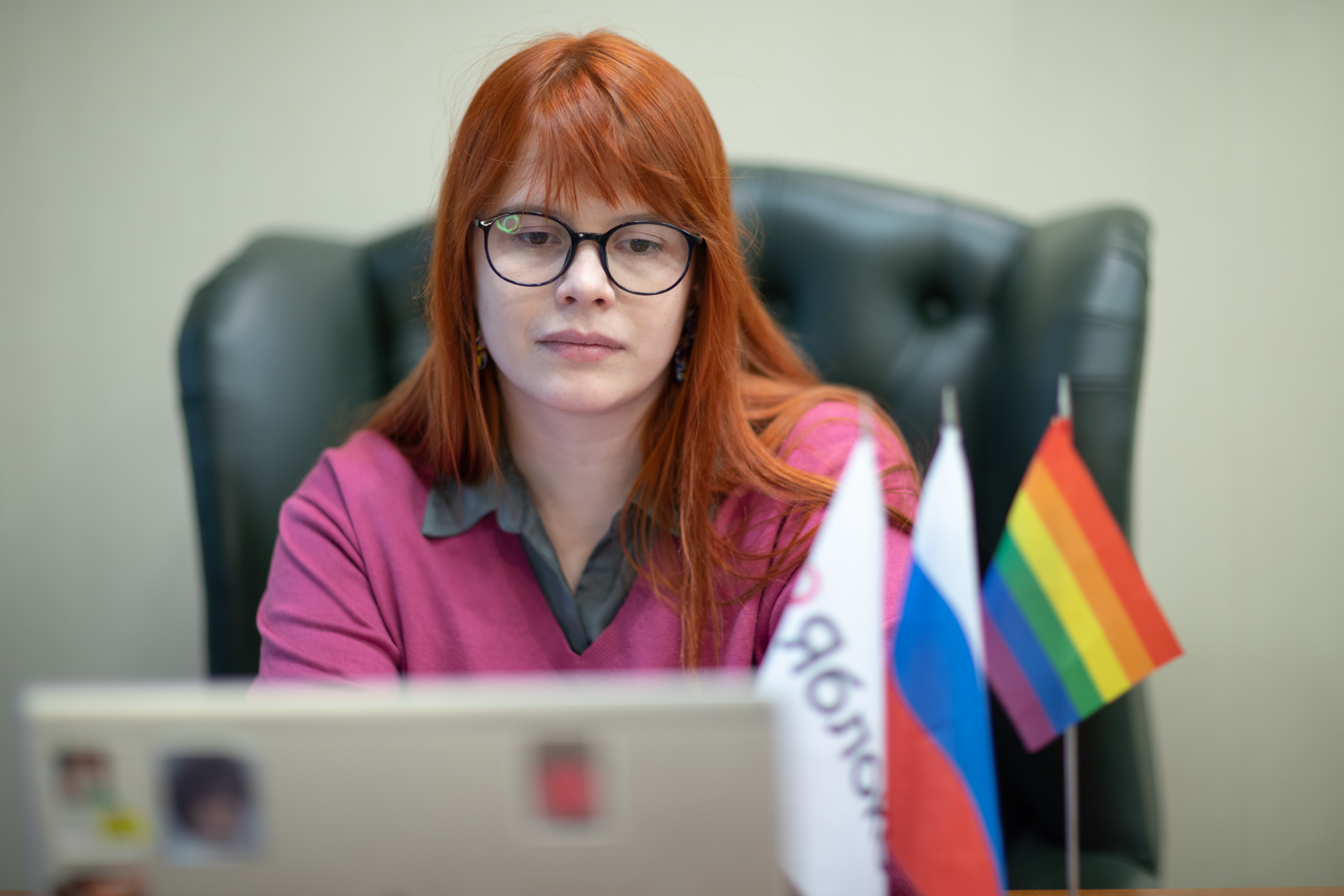
Daria Besedina in the office of a deputy of the Moscow City Duma

After taking the office of a deputy of the Moscow City Duma, Daria Besedina placed a rainbow flag on her desk, and also supported the right of Muscovites to hold gay pride parades.

The first initiative of Daria Besedina as a deputy of the 7th Moscow City Duma was to initiate the dissolution of the Moscow City Duma. According to Besedina, the elected composition of the parliament did not reflect the real sentiments of Muscovites, since most of the opposition candidates were not allowed to participate in the elections. And those who were admitted won. The proposal for self-dissolution was not supported by the deputies.

In October 2019, when considering the Moscow budget in the first reading, at a meeting of the Duma, Besedina demanded public hearings on the draft budget. Hearings were organized and conducted. Besedina introduced amendments to the draft budget, providing for the allocation of money for the construction of trams and the purchase of trolleybuses instead of spending on road construction, but the amendments were rejected. Daria Besedina was one of 7 deputies who voted against the draft budget.

In November 2019, she proposed that the deputies of the Moscow City Duma abandon official cars, replacing them with the right to free travel on public transport and taxis, which would reduce the Moscow budget expenditures on the maintenance of deputies by 100 million rubles a year.

During the report to the deputies of the Moscow City Duma by the Mayor of Moscow Sergey Sobyanin, despite opposition from the deputies from United Russia and the microphone being turned off, Daria asked a question about the people convicted in the framework of the "Moscow case", and asked the mayor, does he feel responsible for the fact that people are in prison? The question was rejected by a special commission of the Moscow City Duma, however Sergey Sobyanin answered.

In December 2019, she appealed to the court against the amendments to the regulations of the Moscow City Duma made by the United Russia faction, allowing deputies to vote without being present at the meeting. Such a claim was filed by a deputy against the actions of the Moscow City Duma for the first time in its history.

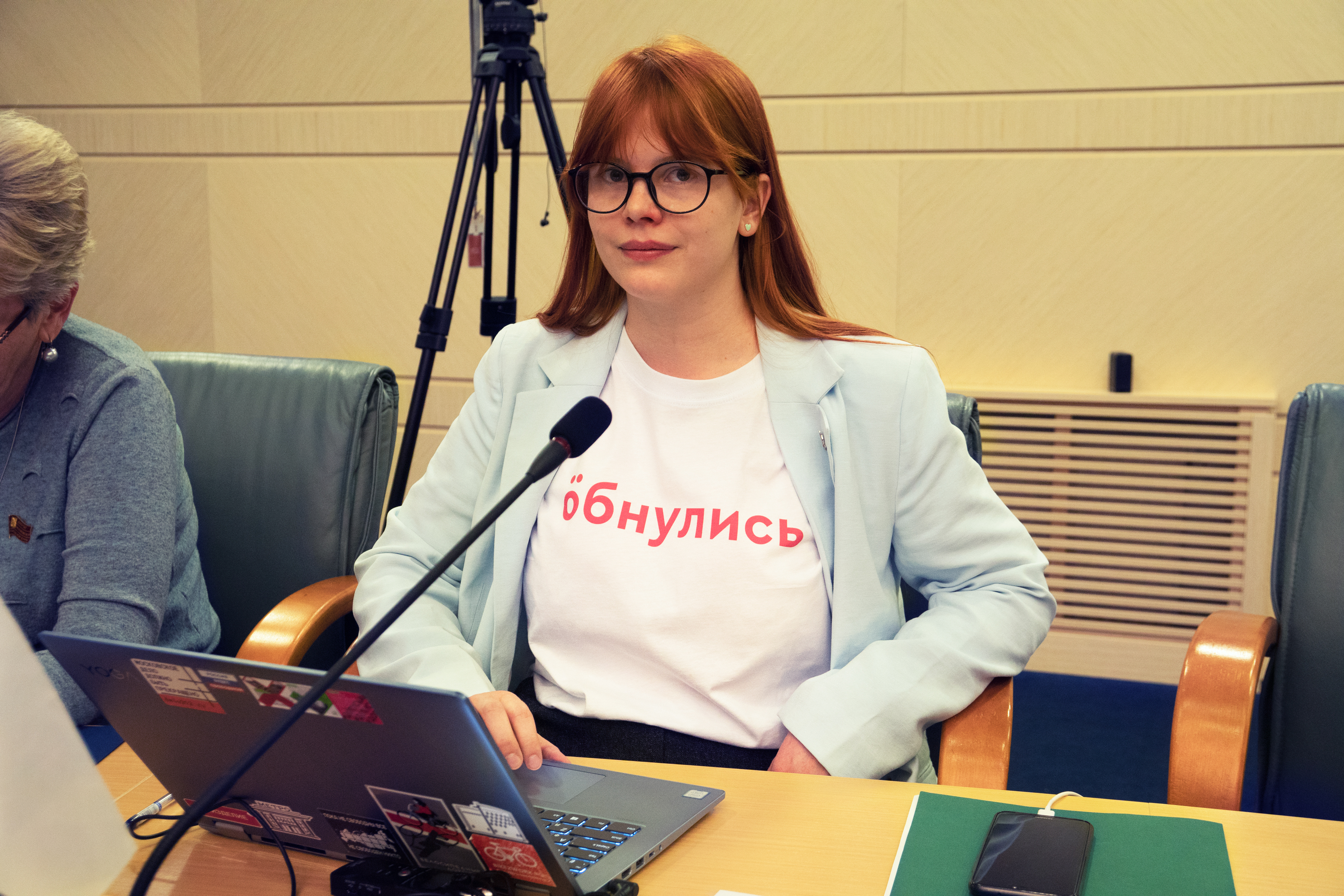
Deputy Besedina at a meeting of the Moscow City Duma on March 12, 2020, where amendments to the constitution were approved

On March 12, 2020, Besedina came to an extraordinary meeting of the Duma, convened to express approval of amendments to the constitution proposed by President Vladimir Putin, wearing a T-shirt with the inscription "Ӧбнулись" (a play on words that combines "fucked up" with "zeroed out"), thus expressing her disagreement with the proposed zeroing out of presidential terms of Vladimir Putin.

We cannot accept amendments to the Constitution, which are designed only so that Putin will rule Russia for another 16 years.

— Daria Besedina

After Besedina's speech, the broadcast from the meeting was turned off. After the break, Besedina proposed to make amendments to the draft resolution of the Moscow City Duma approving the amendments to the constitution. Before the statement of approval, Besedina proposed adding absurd phrases, for example, "given that V.V. Putin, His Excellency, is the President for Life" or "given that V.V. Putin is a gift from the Russians to humanity." After that, Besedina was deprived of the floor until the end of the second meeting.

In November 2021, she submitted to the Moscow City Duma a bill on the introduction of fines for exceeding the speed limit by 5 km/h, and for exceeding by 40 km/h - 35 hours of compulsory work or a fine of 10 thousand rubles.

=== Expulsion from Yabloko and creation of a social movement ===
On December 28, 2021, among 98 fellow party members from the Moscow branch, she was expelled from the Yabloko party. The next day, December 29, she announced plans to create a public movement "Yabloko", which should "revive "Yabloko" as a political movement of a liberal, democratic and human rights persuasion, and try to return to itself a legal entity as a party".

Darya stated that a split had occurred in the party, and the chairman of Yabloko, Nikolay Rybakov, was expelling party members because of differences in opinions, destroying internal party democracy. She considers the new movement to be the political successor to the party.

A statement on the creation of the movement, published on the website of the radio station "Echo of Moscow", announced the intention to register it as a political party in accordance with Russian law, or to reunite with the Yabloko party if "it will be controlled by people who share the values of the party".

On December 30, a decision of the general meeting of the Yabloko public movement was published on Daria Besedina's Telegram channel, by which Daria was appointed chairman for a period until December 15, 2023, that is, until the end of Nikolay Rybakov's chairmanship.
