= Zorge =

Zorge may refer to:

- Zorge, Walkenried, a village in Lower Saxony, Germany, today part of the municipality Walkenried
- Zorge (river), of Lower Saxony and Thuringia, Germany
- Zorge (Moscow Central Circle), a station on the Moscow Central Circle of the Moscow Metro
