= Marshala Koneva Street =

Street in Shchukino District, Moscow, Russia

Coordinates: 55°47′49.5″N 37°29′20.5″E

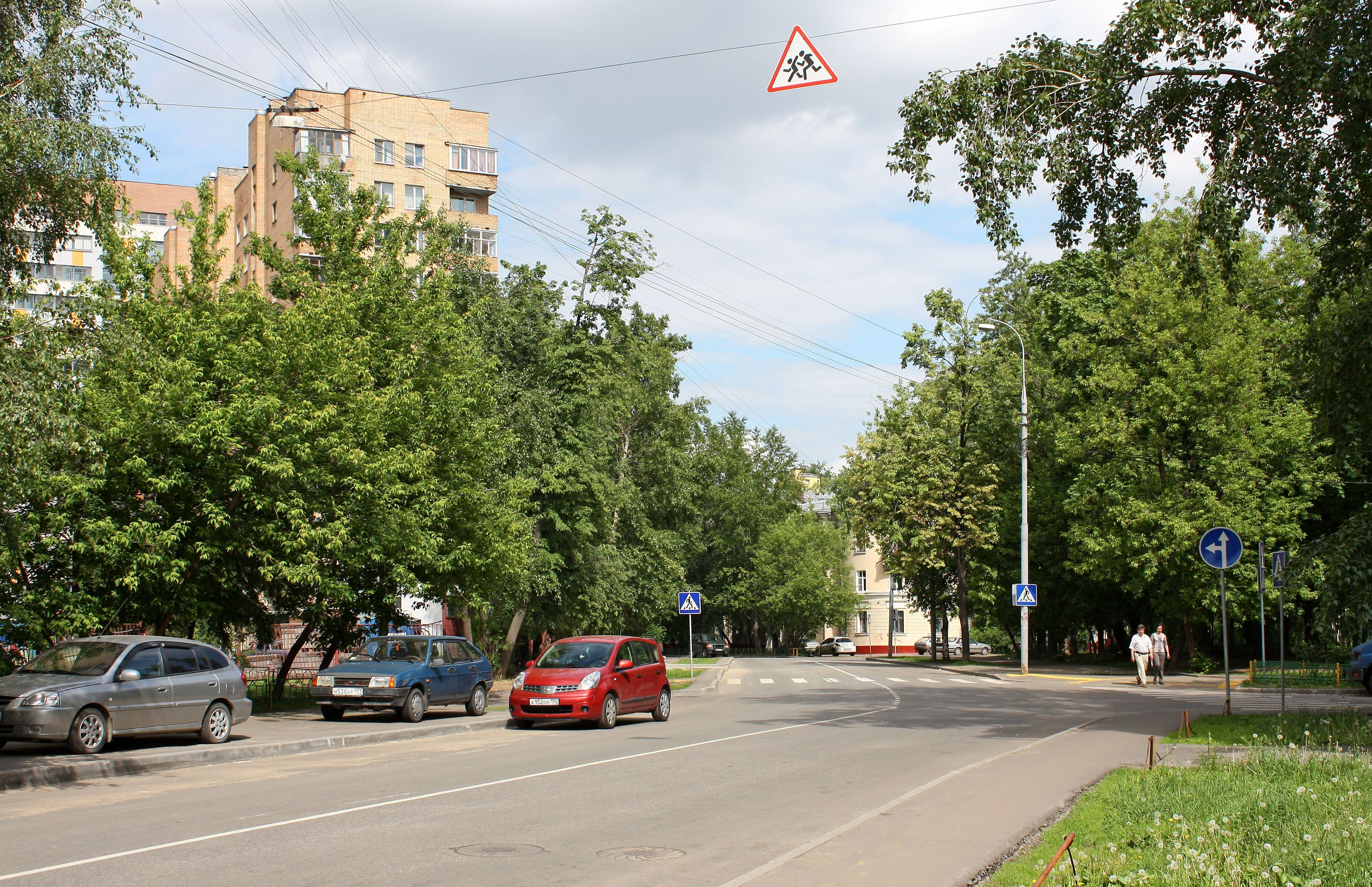
Marshala Koneva Street

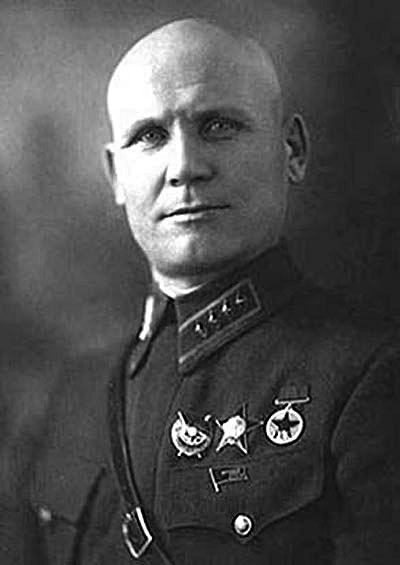
Marshal Ivan Konev, for whom the street is named

Marshala Koneva Street (Russian: у́лица Ма́ршала Ко́нева) is a street in Shchukino District of North-Western Administrative Okrug of the federal city of Moscow, Russia. Raspletina Street is located to the east of it and 1-y Volokolamsky Driveway is to the west.

== History ==
=== Naming ===
In May 28, 1973, 2-y Volokolamsky Driveway and the 3-y Oktyabrskogo Polya Street were merged to create Marshala Koneva Street, named after Ivan Konev, the Marshal of the Soviet Union.
