= Political Uber =

Political Uber is a project of Russian politicians Dmitry Gudkov and Maxim Katz to help young and promising opposition candidates register for municipal elections and run election campaigns.

== Name ==
The project gained popularity under this name because of the analogy with the popular taxi service. The name embodies the maximum simplification of the user experience, including through the use of information technology with elements of gamification: for example, the overly complicated task of submitting documents for registration as a candidate in elections in the "political Uber" was presented in the form of a quest.

== Goals of the project ==
If you are against Putin, we will help you

— Maxim Katz

According to Katz, access to participation in politics in Russia is too complicated, it is difficult even for entrepreneurs with money, not to mention less socially protected segments of the population, such as pensioners. According to Katz, such difficulties are created deliberately by the current government. The goal of "political Uber" is to eliminate such difficulties, to simplify access to elections for everyone.

According to Gudkov, the project is focused on newcomers to politics who do not know how to collect signatures, fill out subscription lists, solve other similar problems, and only with the help of "uberization" of the process can they successfully pass registration and get a chance to be elected deputies. Also, according to Gudkov, the project was focused on people who are dissatisfied with the fact that the authorities do not hear them. "Political Uber" offered such people a convenient infrastructure in order to nominate themselves as candidates, so that later, if elected, they would begin to influence the situation, first in their own regions, and then at the national level. Opponents of Vladimir Putin and supporters of the European path of development were invited to the project.

== Campaign in Moscow ==
In 2017, "Political Uber" was first launched in the Moscow municipal elections under the brand "United Democrats".

Of the 266 deputies supported by the project, 177 were nominated by the Yabloko party, which made the party the second largest in the city in terms of the number of deputy mandates. Commenting on the election results for Yabloko, Grigory Yavlinsky called Maxim Katz an "effective ally" and noted the involvement of young people in the elections.

As one of the key methods of campaigning, door-to-door canvassing of voters was used, which, according to Gudkov, made it possible to compensate for the authorities' silence about the elections. As a result, 267 out of 1046 candidates of the project became deputies in 62 districts. Candidates from the "political Uber" received about 20% of the votes, and in 7 districts of Moscow not a single candidate from United Russia was elected.

Later, in January 2018, Dmitry Gudkov broke off cooperation with Maxim Katz due to disagreements regarding Yabloko and the election observation project.

== Campaign in St. Petersburg ==
In 2019, before the municipal elections in St. Petersburg, the project was divided: Maxim Katz organized his own headquarters to support candidates on the basis of the Yabloko party, while Dmitry Gudkov, in turn, transferred the United Democrats brand to the public organization Open Russia, which organized the headquarters under the same name. Also in 2019, the St. Petersburg Navalny Headquarters performed similar functions of supporting candidates in St. Petersburg under its own brand spb.vote.

The Yabloko headquarters received about 1,800 applications for nomination, a strict selection of candidates was carried out according to their political views. According to Maxim Katz, there were falsifications of the election results. As a result of the campaign, 99 people were elected deputies in 31 districts of the city.
