= Oktyabrskoye Pole =

Moscow Metro station

Oktyabrskoye Pole Октябрьское поле
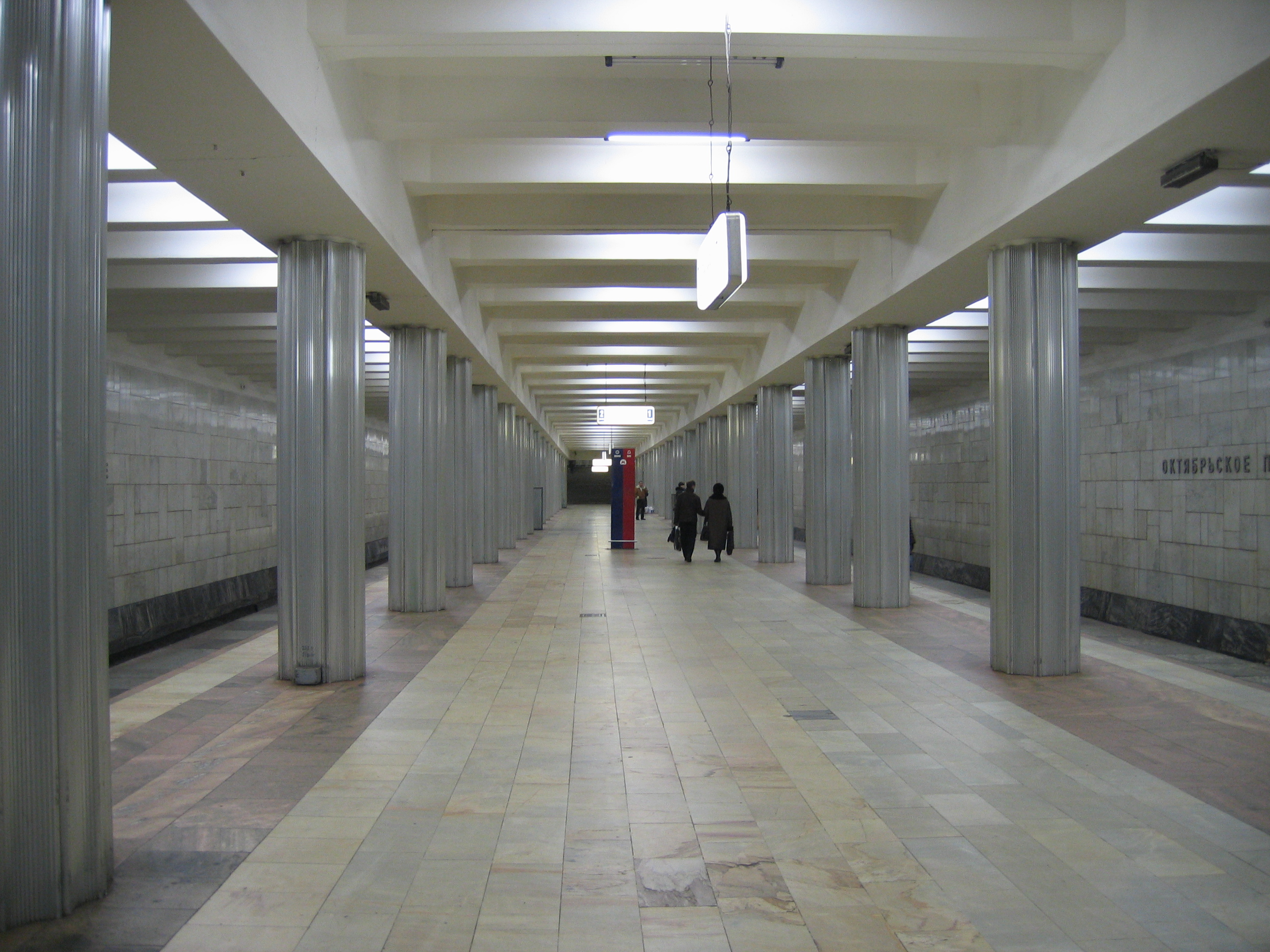

General information
- Location: Shchukino District; North-Western Administrative Okrug; Moscow; Russia
- Coordinates: 55.7935°N 37.4935°E
- System: Moscow Metro station
- Owner: Moskovsky Metropoliten
- Line: Tagansko-Krasnopresnenskaya line
- Platforms: 1 island platform
- Tracks: 2
- Connections: Bus: 26, 39, 39к, 100, 105, 253, 253к, 681, 691, 800; Trolleybus: 19, 59, 61

Construction
- Depth: 11 metres (36 ft)
- Platform levels: 1
- Parking: No

Other information
- Station code: 124

History
- Opened: 30 December 1975; 50 years ago

Services
Preceding station	Moscow Metro	Following station
Shchukinskaya towards Planernaya	Tagansko-Krasnopresnenskaya line	Polezhayevskaya towards Kotelniki
Out-of-station interchange
Zorge anticlockwise / outer	Moscow Central Circle transfer at Panfilovskaya	Streshnevo clockwise / inner
Route map
Location
- Location within Moscow Metro

Oktyabrskoye Pole (Russian: Октябрьское Поле) is a station on the Tagansko-Krasnopresnenskaya Line of the Moscow Metro. The station was opened on 30 December 1972 as part of the Krasnopresnenskiy radius, and for exactly three years it was the original terminus of the Krasnopresnenskaya Line. The station received its name from a nearby locality which was initially known as Voyennoye Pole (Military Field) and as Oktyabrskoye Pole (October Field, named after October Revolution) since 1922, during the Soviet era.

Designed by Nina Alyoshina and L. Zaitseva, the station features a typical pillar-trispan "Novaya Sorokonozhka" design, with polygonal aluminium coated pillars and walls with bright-grey coloured marble decorated with anodized aluminium artworks (artists Bodnieks and Rysin). The floor is coated white marble except for the area around the pillars where it gives way to black granite. The two vestibules are interlinked with subways that allow access to Narodnogo Opolcheniya Street (Russian: улица Народного Ополчения) and Marshala Biryuzova Street (Russian: улица Маршала Бирюзова).

The station has a daily passenger flow of 75,910 people.
