= Ilya Varlamov =

Russian journalist (born 1984)

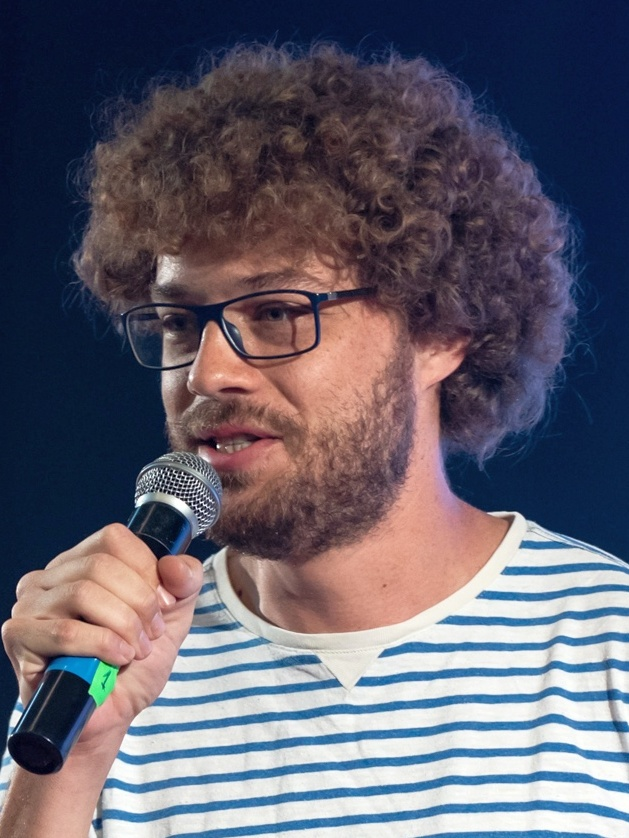
- Varlamov in May 2018
- Born: Ilya Aleksandrovich Varlamov; 7 January 1984 (age 42); Moscow, Russian SFSR, Soviet Union
- Other name: zyalt (former LiveJournal username)
- Occupations: YouTuber; Blogger; Journalist; Photographer; Urbanist; Political activist; Entrepreneur

YouTube information
- Channels: varlamov; Ilya Varlamov; Varlamov Travel
- Years active: 2006–present (blogging), 2017–present (What's Happening?)
- Genres: Travel; Urbanism; News; Politics; City planning
- Subscribers: 5.13 million
- Views: 1.74 billion
- Last updated: August 2024
- Website: varlamov.ru

Ilya Aleksandrovich Varlamov (/vərˈlɑːmɒf, -mɒv/ vər-LAH-mof, -mov; Russian: Илья Александрович Варламов; born 7 January 1984) is a Russian blogger, journalist, photographer, urbanist, and YouTuber known for his critical commentary on Russian politics and urban planning. He gained prominence through his blog and later his YouTube news program What's Happening? (Чё происходит?). Varlamov has extensively documented political protests and opposition marches, leading to political persecution and criminal charges against him in Russia. He has also gained a following for his travel blogs, which cover diverse locations worldwide. In 2018, he founded the "Attention!" ("Внимание!" in Russian) foundation, dedicated to preserving historical heritage in Russia.

== Early life and career ==
Ilya Aleksandrovich Varlamov was born on 7 January 1984 in Moscow, where he was raised. He graduated from the Moscow Architectural Institute with a degree in architecture. During his studies, he founded a company that evolved into the iCube group, a design and development agency. Together with Maxim Katz, he co-founded the City Projects Foundation, focused on promoting urban improvements in Russia.

== Blogging and journalism ==
Varlamov began his blog on LiveJournal under the username "zyalt" in 2006, initially focusing on photography. His blog became a prominent platform for independent journalism and political commentary. In 2015, he established Varlamov.ru as an independent media outlet. He moved his blog to the Teletype platform in 2021. His work covers various topics, including urban planning, Russian politics, and global events. He has also maintained an active presence on other social media platforms like Twitter and YouTube.

=== What's Happening? ===
Varlamov's YouTube channel features a weekly news show What's Happening?, which covers major current events. The show debuted in 2017 and achieved considerable popularity, gaining millions of subscribers. The program has offered commentary and insights into events both within Russia and globally. A version of "What's Happening?" aired briefly on the radio station Komsomolskaya Pravda from January to February 2022.

== Political dissent and persecution ==
=== Coverage of protests ===
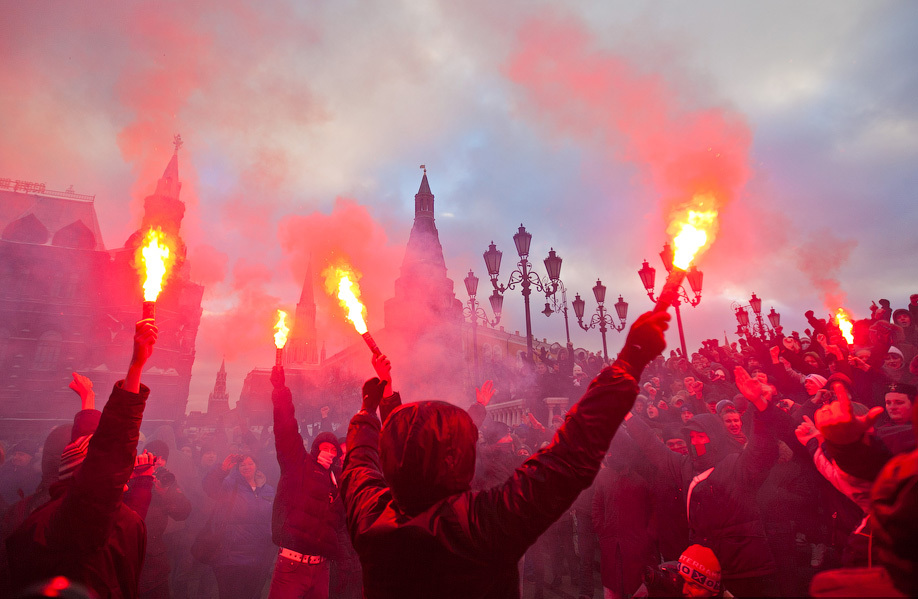
Varlamov during the Manezh Square protests in Moscow

Varlamov has actively documented and participated in opposition protests in Russia. He has covered numerous "Dissenters' Marches", "Strategy-31" protests, and demonstrations against election fraud. His coverage of the 2010 Manezhnaya Square riots and the 2011-2013 protests became widely cited. He was among the first to use drone photography in his reporting, capturing striking images of large-scale demonstrations.

=== Political persecution ===
Varlamov's outspoken criticism of the Russian government has led to official repercussions. In 2023, he was designated a "foreign agent" by the Russian Ministry of Justice for "disseminating false information" and receiving foreign funding. In 2024, a criminal case was initiated against him for alleged violations of "foreign agent" regulations, specifically for failing to properly label his social media posts. Varlamov was also charged with spreading "fakes" (false information) about the Russian armed forces, a crime under Russia's repressive war censorship laws. On 14 August 2025, Varlamov was sentenced in absentia to eight years in prison and fined 99.5 million rubles for a video from 23 November 2023, about Russian strikes on Kryvyi Rih and Odesa, as well as for repeatedly failing to comply with the duties of a "foreign agent".

=== Euromaidan and Crimea ===
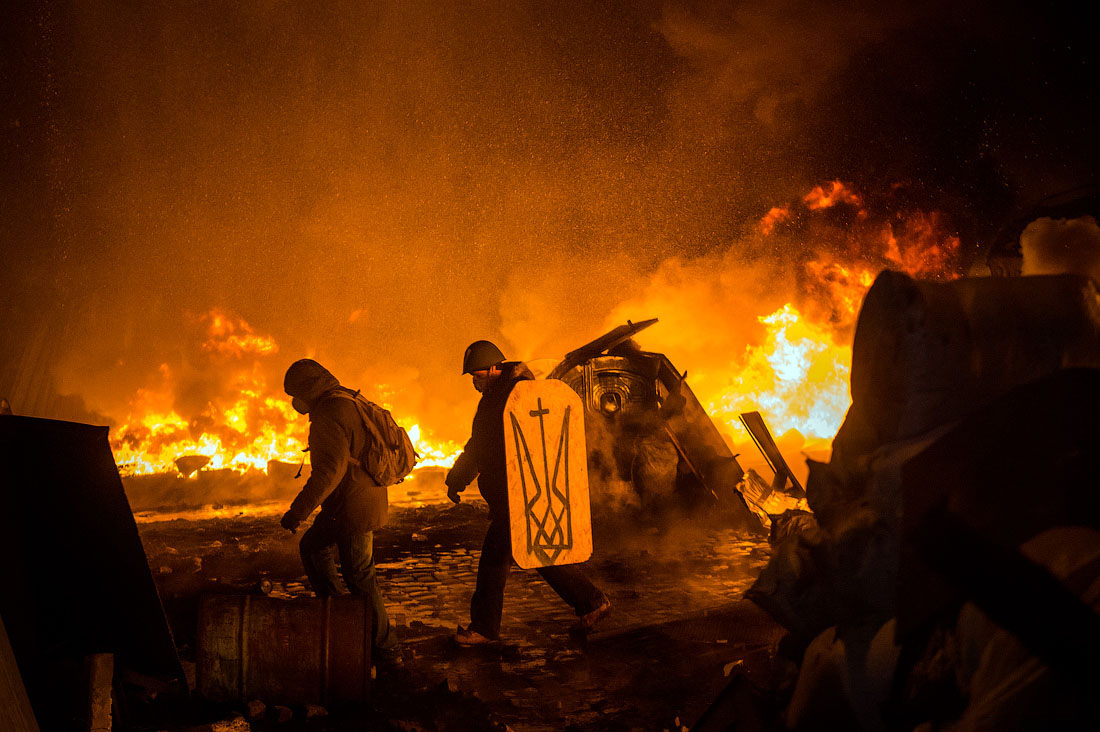
Varlamov on 23 January 2014, during clashes on Euromaidan

Varlamov extensively covered the 2013-2014 Euromaidan protests in Kyiv, providing firsthand accounts, photographs, and live streams from the scene. His documentation of the events gained significant attention from both Russian and Ukrainian media outlets. Following Russia's annexation of Crimea, he published a post titled "Who is seizing Crimea?", which featured photographs of unmarked armed personnel at the Simferopol airport. This led to accusations from pro-government groups in Russia that he was supporting the Euromaidan movement.

=== 2022 Russian Invasion of Ukraine ===
Varlamov has been a vocal critic of the 2022 Russian invasion of Ukraine. He launched the "Together" project (Вместе) to support Russians who left the country following the invasion. His critical stance has further contributed to his conflict with the Russian authorities.

== Urbanism and travel ==
As an architect and urbanist, Varlamov has traveled extensively, documenting and critiquing urban environments around the world. His blog features series like "Good-Bad" (Плохой-хороший), comparing positive and negative aspects of cities, and "Border" (Граница), juxtaposing border towns in Russia with their counterparts in neighboring countries. He has also produced a YouTube series, "BDSM" ("Big Road with the Mayor"), featuring discussions with city mayors about urban issues. In 2021, marking the 30th anniversary of the dissolution of the Soviet Union, Varlamov launched the documentary series "30 Years Without the USSR" (30 лет без СССР), covering the former Soviet republics. In 2026, he launched a new historical cycle, "PTSD from the USSR" (ПТСР от СССР), dedicated to the countries of the former Eastern Bloc; its first episode focused on the GDR. His work often sparks debate and has occasionally drawn criticism from local officials.

== See also ==
- Maxim Katz
- Opposition to Vladimir Putin
- 2011–2013 Russian protests
