= Vukan R. Vuchic =

Serbian-American transport planner

- Vukan R. Vučić
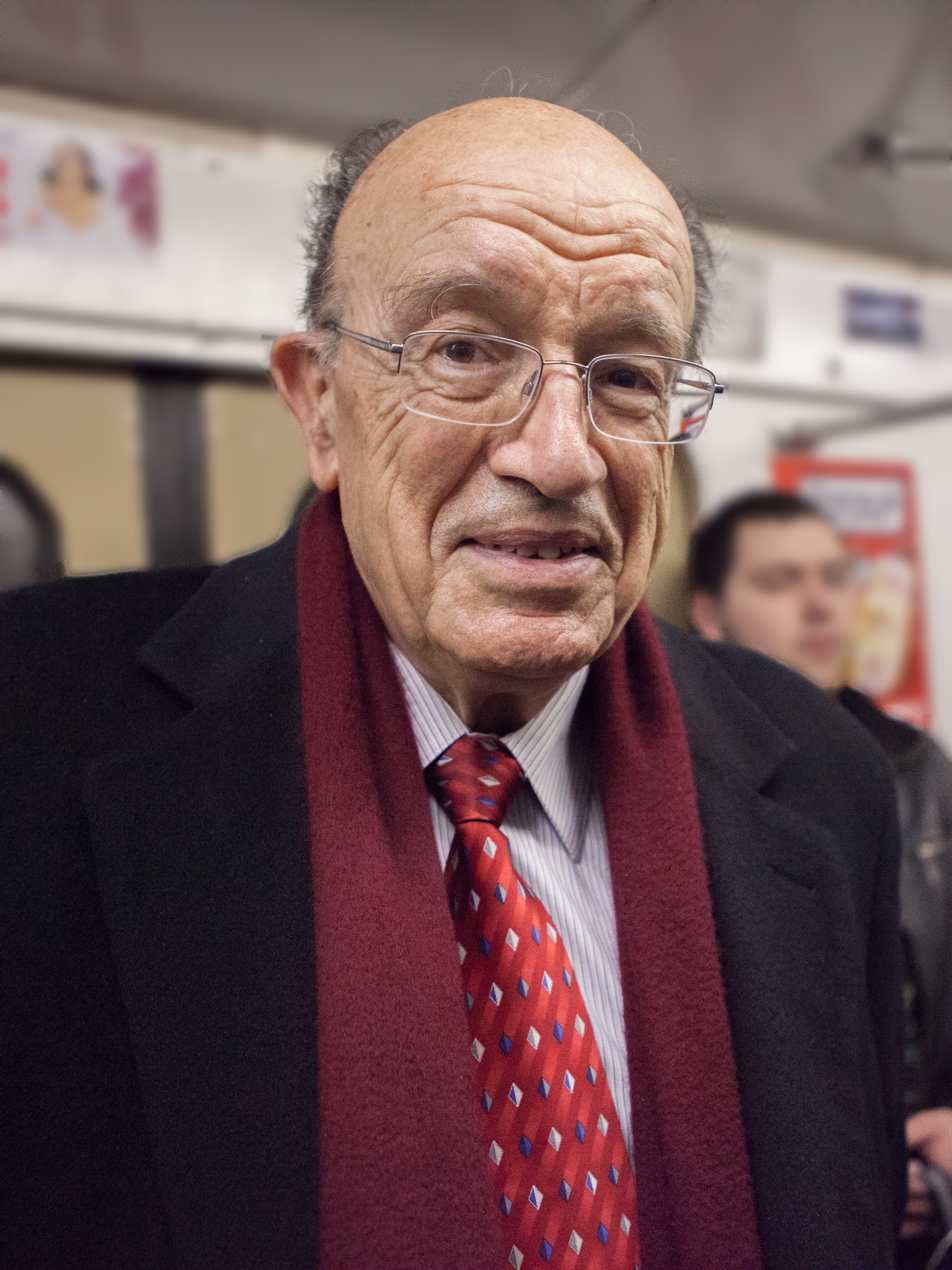
- Vuchic in 2013
- Born: 14 January 1935 (age 91); Belgrade, Kingdom of Yugoslavia
- Awards: Friedrich Lehner medal, Wilbur S. Smith Award

Vukan R. Vuchic (Serbian: Vukan R. Vučić, Serbian Cyrillic: Вукан Р. Вучић; born 14 January 1935) is a Serbian-American public transport expert, a professor of the University of Pennsylvania, and a former consultant to the United States Department of Transportation on the planning, design and operation of transport systems. In 1994, he was elected a member of the Serbian Academy of Sciences and Arts.

== Public Transport ==
Gregory Thompson credits Vuchic with defining the light rail mode of public transportation through his 1972 report that compared nascent subway-streetcar operation in the United States with the current state in Europe, although the concept of light rail had been discussed at least as early as 1962 by Dean Quinby. Vuchic has made a qualified point about the economic value of public transport for cities, assessing the comparative worth of buses, light rail, or rapid transit. In the October 1972 report prepared for the Urban Mass Transportation Administration defining light rail, he notes that each has a particular urban-geographic setting in which is the better choice. Buses, for instance, are superior to light rail in areas of low density. He contrasts that with rapid transit, which is superior wherever high-capacity, high-speed service is warranted, due to greater population density. Light rail is the optimal solution for transit services of the intermediate kind, being competitive with the automobile where there are space restrictions, but where demand is moderate and high-cost investments are not feasible.

Of particular interest is his 1973 study comparing heavy rail service in Lindenwold to bus rapid transit lanes on the Shirley Highway; the Lindenwold High Speed Line (heavy rail) operated with higher ridership and passenger revenues compared to the Shirley Busway, despite the Busway's lower initial capital costs.

== Bibliography ==
- — (October 1972). Light Rail Transit Systems - A Definition and Evaluation (Report). Urban Mass Transportation Administration, US Department of Transportation.
- — Richard M. Stanger (October 1974). New transit technologies: an objective analysis is overdue (Report). Railway Gazette International.
- — (1979). Public Transportation: Planning, Operations and Management. Prentice Hall. ISBN 978-0137391691. (author of two chapters)
- — (1981). Urban Public Transportation Systems and Technology. Prentice Hall. ISBN 978-0139394966.
- — (1999). Transportation for Livable Cities. CUPR/Transaction. p. 376. ISBN 978-0882851617.
- — (2005). Urban Transit Operations, Planning and Economics. John Wiley & Sons. ISBN 978-0471632658.
- — J. Casello (2007). Transit System Planning. Institute of Transportation Engineers.
- — (2007). Urban Transit Systems and Technology. John Wiley & Sons. p. 624. ISBN 978-0-471-75823-5.
