= Shchukino District =

Shchukino District район Щукино (Russian)
- District
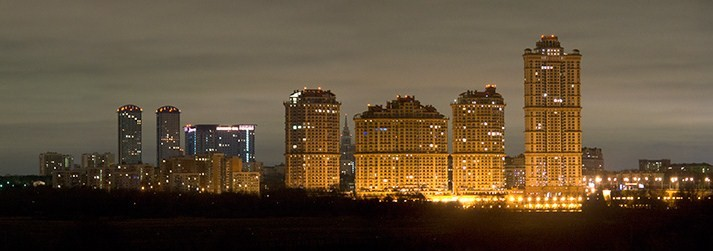
- Alye Parusa residential buildings in Shchukino District

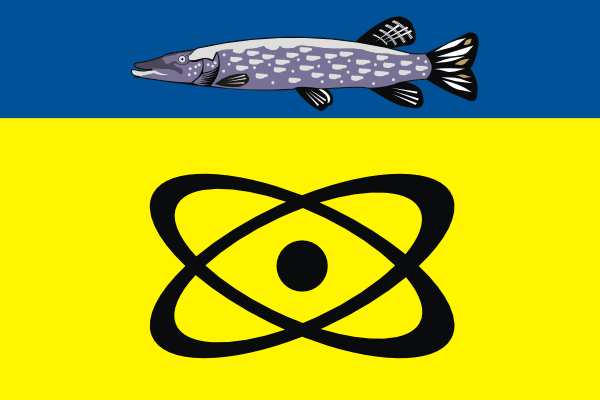
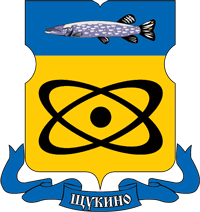
- Flag Coat of arms
- Location of Shchukino District on the map of Moscow
- Coordinates: 55°48′08″N 37°28′03″E
- Country: Russia
- Federal subject: Moscow

Area
  - Total: 7.68 km^{2} (2.97 sq mi)

Population (2010 Census)
  - Total: 105,665
  - Density: 13,800/km^{2} (35,600/sq mi)
  - Urban: 100%
  - Rural: 0%
- Time zone: UTC+
- OKTMO ID: 45372000
- Website: https://schukino.mos.ru/

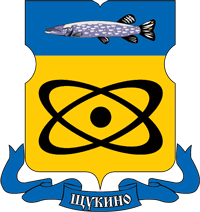
2003 coat of arms proposal for Shchukino District

Shchukino District (Russian: райо́н Щу́кино) is an administrative district (raion) of North-Western Administrative Okrug, and one of the 125 administrative districts of the federal city of Moscow, Russia. It borders with Pokrovskoye-Streshnevo District in the south, Strogino District in the east, Khoroshevo-Mnevniki District in the north, and in the west there is the boundary between North-Western and Northern Administrative Okrugs. The area of the district is 7.68 square kilometers (2.97 sq mi). Population: 105,665 (2010 census); 89,454 (2002 census).

== History ==
In 1415, Vasily I of the Grand Duchy of Moscow built the village of Shchukino to the east of the Moskva River.

1945-1991
After the war and before the beginning of mass building of the 1960s there has continued the residential construction in the Oktyabrskoye Pole district (already at 5 floors) and a development of scientific establishments. Near the Kurchatov Institute there had been originated the A.Bochvar Institute of Inorganic Materials. The "journey of two academics" (Maximov street) has divided two "nuclear" territories. Nearby, there has set the stage of the Research Institute of Instrumentation on the Raspletin street and at the north, the Institute of Virology and Epidemiology was constructed on a Gamalei street. There were built cottage towns for management of the institutes on the Rogov street, Pehotnaya street and Aviacionnaya street. Most of them were demolished in the early 1980s. The Hospital № 6 was built for professors and management who worked on the atomic projects at the Novoschukinskaya street. Separate "Stalinist" houses have appeared on the Zhivopisnaja street, Moscow the Kurchatov Square, the Zhadova Square and on adjacent streets.

Mass buildings of the Shchukino district has affected the village Shchukino (Aviacionnaya street, Novoschukinskaya street), and some neighborhoods on the Maksimova street, Moscow, Biruzova street and others. Mostly it was completed in the 1970s. In the late 1970s the large-scale construction has shifted on the west to the Strogino district where was set the stage of the Stroginsky bridge in 1981.

Modernity

- The "Fifth Avenue" shopping center located on the Marshal Birjuzova street. There are a multiplex cinema "Cinema Park on Oktyabrskoye Pole", a food court, shops, a billiard club, supermarket "Crossroads", an underground parking.
- "Shchuka" (Pike) shopping center located on the Marshala Vasilevskogo street. You can enter from the "Schukinskaya" metro station without going outside. This complex is one of the largest shopping centers located within the Ring Road. There is a multiplex cinema "Karo Film", a bowling alley, a food court, shops of different price categories, the "Alie Parusa" (Scarlet Sails) supermarket.

A large objects on the territory of the district is the "Alie Parusa".

Shchukino became a district in 1918 and has been a part of North-Western Administrative Okrug since 1988.

== Notable streets ==
- Akademika Kurchatova Square
- Aviatsionnata Street
- Marshala Biryuzova Street
- Marshala Koneva Street
- Pekhotnaya Street
