= Savyolovsky suburban railway line =

Railway line in Russia

Savyolovsky Suburban Railway

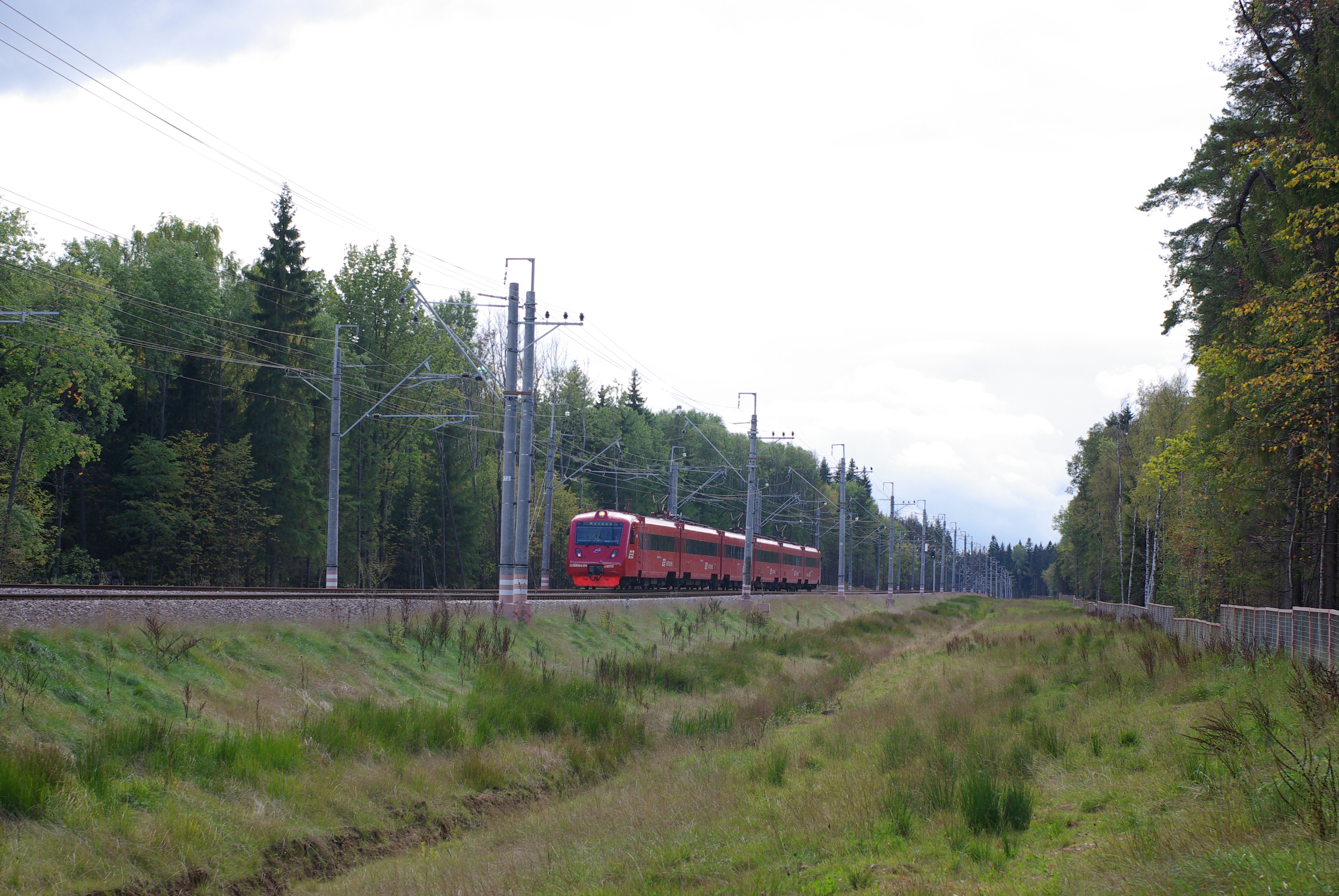
- An Aeroexpress traversing on the Savyolovsky suburban line.

Overview
- Native name: Савёловское направление Московской железной дороги
- Owner: Russian Railways
- Locale: Moscow Oblast and Tver Oblast
- Termini: Moscow Savyolovsky; Savyolovo
- Stations: 41

Service
- Type: Commuter rail Airport rail link
- System: Moscow Railway
- Operator(s): Russian Railways
- Rolling stock: ED4MKM-AERO; ESh2 "Eurasia"; EG2Tv; RVR ER2; ED4M

History
- Commenced: 1898
- Opened: February 1900

Technical
- Line length: 129 km (80 mi)
- Track gauge: 1,520 mm (4 ft 11 27/32 in) Russian gauge
- Electrification: 3 kV DC overhead line

Map of line

The Savyolovsky suburban railway line (Russian: Савёловское направление Московской железной дороги) is one of eleven suburban railway lines used for suburban railway connections between Moscow, Russia, and surrounding areas, mostly in Moscow Oblast. The Savyolovsky suburban railway line connects Moscow with the stations in the north, in particular, with the towns of Dolgoprudny, Lobnya, Yakhroma, Dmitrov, Taldom, Dubna, and Kimry. The stations the line serves are located in Moscow, as well as in Dolgoprudny, Lobnya, Mytishchi, Dmitrov, Dubna, and Taldom in Moscow Oblast, and in Kimrsky District of Tver Oblast. Some of the suburban trains have their southern terminus at Moscow Savyolovsky railway station in Moscow, others commute from the Belorussky suburban railway line. In the northern direction, the suburban trains terminate at Lobnya, Aeroport Sheremetyevo, Iksha, Dmitrov, Verbilki, Dubna, Taldom, and Savyolovo. The suburban railway line is served by the Moscow Railway. The tracks between Moscow Savyolovsky railway station and Lobnya are also used by Line D1, one of the Moscow Central Diameters, and by the service to Sheremetyevo International Airport, provided by Aeroexpress. A section between Iksha and Yahroma is also used by the Greater Ring of the Moscow Railway.

The suburban railway line follows the railway which connects Moscow with Rybinsk and Vesyegonsk. It is electrified between Moscow and Savyolovo. Between Moscow and Dmitrov, there are two tracks, north of Dmitrov there is one track. The distance between Savyolovsky railway station and Savyolovo is 129 kilometres (80 mi).

== History ==
The concession to build a railway between Moscow and Savyolovo was given in 1897 to the Second Society of Connecting Lines. The Society of Moscow — Yaroslavl — Arkhangelsk Railway viewed this as competition, protested, and indeed got the concession, by promising to open an extra passenger station and a cargo station in Moscow (currently Moscow Savyolovsky railway station). The construction started in 1898, and it turned out that there were insufficient supplies of stone in the construction areas. The stone had to be transported from the areas south of Moscow, which made the construction more expensive than it was originally planned. In February 1900, trial traffic started, and in January 1901 the section between Beskudnikovo and Savyolovo was opened. The railway only had one track. In 1900, a railway line connecting Beskudnikovo and Losinoostrovskaya was constructed. This was done in order to facilitate the railway traffic between Moscow and Savyolovo, since Moscow Savyolovsky railway station was not open yet. After a tram line from central line to Medvedkovo was built, in 1966 a direct connection to Losinoostrovskaya was discontinued, and the whole railway line between Beskudnikovo and Losinoostrovskaya was demolished in 1987. In 1902, Moscow Savyolovsky railway station was opened, and traffic was rerouted there. The second track between Moscow and Dmitrov was constructed between 1932 and 1934. The line from Verbilki to Bolshaya Volga was constructed in the 1930s to serve the construction of the Moscow Canal, since the construction headquarters were in Bolshaya Volga. The line was demolished during World War II and restored in the 1940s, in the 1970s it was extended to Dubna.

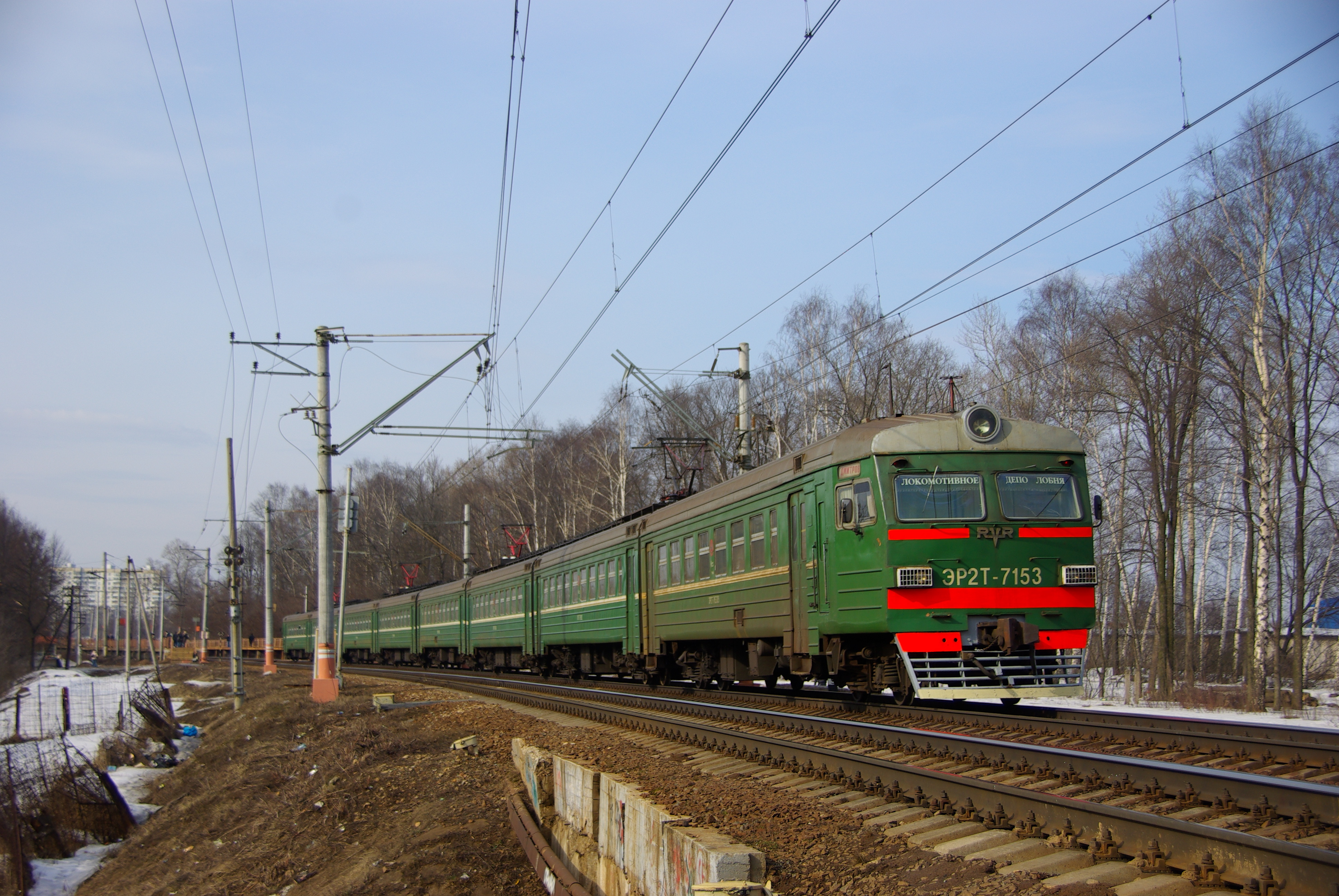
Standard train of Savyolovskoe line for 1990s and 2000s, green ER2T class (2009) at Vodniki station. At this place a new highway overpass was built in 2010s

In 1954, the section between Moscow and Iksha was electrified. In 1955, the electrification was extended to Dmitrov, in the 1970s to Dubna, and in 1978 to Savyolovo. The tracks between Savyolovo and Kalyazin remain not electrified.

On 21 November 2019, Moscow Central Diameters started operation.

== Stations ==
Following the standard notations in Russia, a railway stop below is called a station if it is a terminus or if it has a cargo terminal, and it is called a platform otherwise.

=== Moscow to Savyolovo ===
1. Moscow Savyolovsky railway station, transfer to Savyolovskaya metro station of Serpukhovsko–Timiryazevskaya line and Savyolovskaya metro station of Bolshaya Koltsevaya line;
2. Timiryazevskaya (platform), Timiryazevskaya metro station;
3. Okruzhnaya, (platform), Okruzhnaya metro station of Lyublinsko–Dmitrovskaya line and Okruzhnaya Moscow Central Circle station;
4. Degunino (platform);
5. Beskudnikovo (station);
6. Lianozovo (platform);
7. Mark (station);
8. Novodachnaya (platform);
9. Dolgoprudnaya (platform);
10. Vodniki (platform);
11. Khlebnikovo (platform);
12. Sheremetyevskaya (platform);
13. Lobnya (station);
14. Depo (platform);
15. Lugovaya (platform);
16. Nekrasovskaya (platform);
17. Katuar (platform);
18. Trudovaya;
19. Iksha (station), connection to the Greater Ring of the Moscow Railway;
20. Morozki (platform);
21. Turist (platform);
22. Yakhroma (station), connection to the Greater Ring of the Moscow Railway;
23. Dmitrov (station), connection to the Greater Ring of the Moscow Railway;
24. Kanalstroy (platform);
25. Imeni Barsuchenko (platform);
26. Orudyevo (platform);
27. Verbilki (station);
28. 94 km (platform);
29. Vlasovo (platform);
30. Taldom-Savyolovsky (station);
31. Lebzino (platform);
32. 124 km (platform);
33. Savyolovo (station), further connection to Uglich and Sonkovo.

=== Sheremetyevskaya to Aeroport Sheremetyevo ===
1. Sheremetyevskaya (platform);
2. Aeroport Sheremetyevo (station).

=== Verbilki to Dubna ===
1. Verbilki (station);
2. Sorevnovaniye (platform);
3. Zaprudnaya (platform);
4. Tempy (platform);
5. Meldino (platform);
6. 119 km (platform);
7. Karmanovo (platform);
8. Bolshaya Volga (station);
9. Dubna (station).
