= Savyolovskaya =

Savyolovskaya may refer to:

- Moscow Savyolovsky railway station or Butyrskaya vokzal, a commuter station
- Savyolovskaya (Serpukhovsko-Timiryazevskaya line), on line 9 of the Moscow Metro
- Savyolovskaya (Bolshaya Koltsevaya line), on line 11 of the Moscow Metro
