= Perimilovsky Heights =

World War 2 battlefield near Moscow

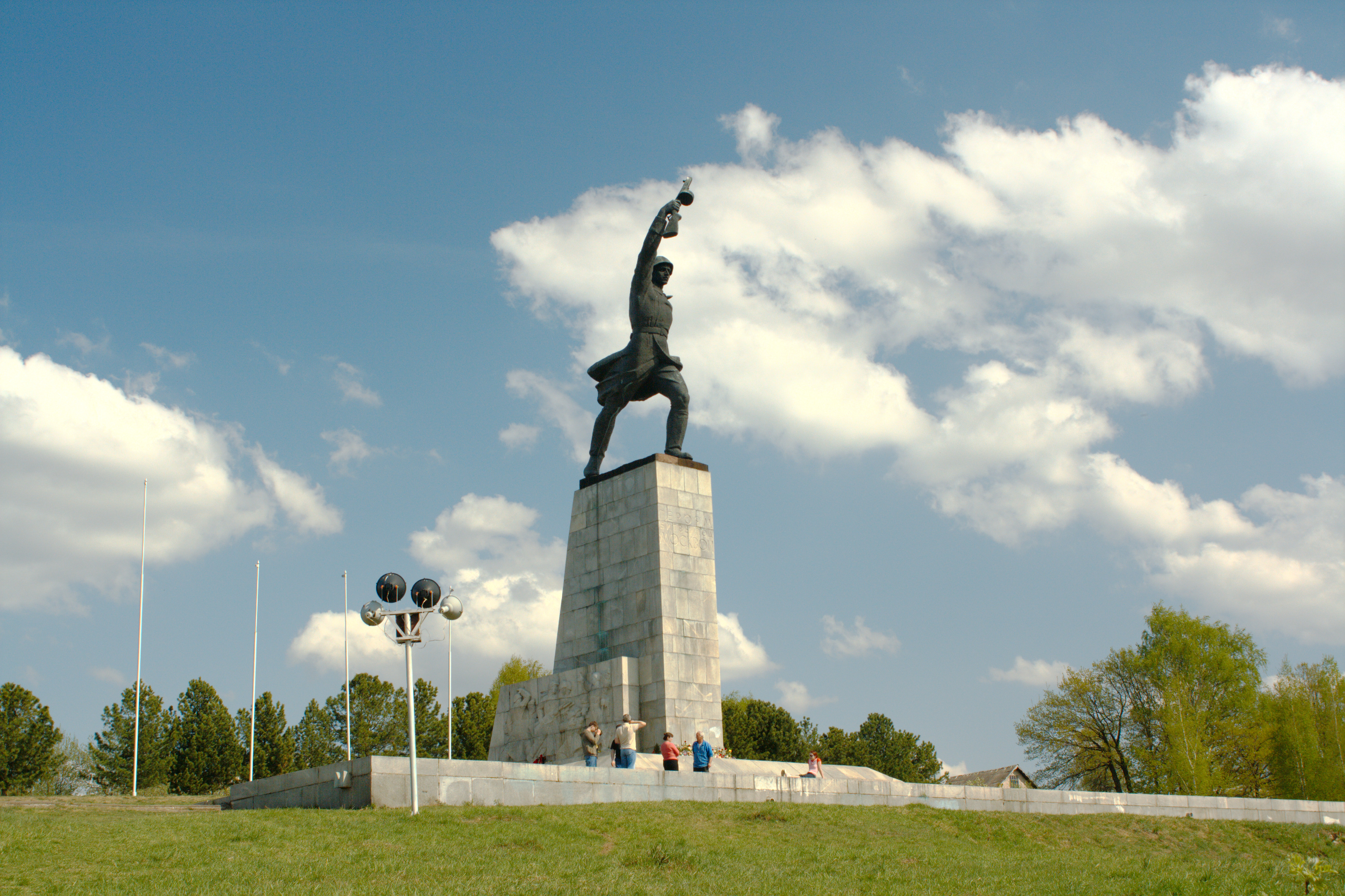
- Monument "Heroes of the Battle of Moscow" The place of the turning point in the defense of the northern approaches to Moscow.

Highest point
- Elevation: 214.9 m (705 ft)
- Coordinates: 56°17′52″N 37°30′04″E

Geography
- Location: Moscow Oblast, Russia
- Parent range: Klin-Dmitrovsk Range

Perimilovsky Heights (Перемиловские высоты) is a place of bloody battles on the eastern front during the World War II from November 27 to December 5, 1941. It was named after the village of Peremilovo, Dmitrovsky District, Moscow Oblast, located on the left (eastern) bank of the Moscow Canal opposite the town of Yakhroma (now the eastern part of Yakhroma), right next to the bridge over the canal.

This is one of the frontiers where the Wehrmacht troops were stopped, the easternmost point of their advance on the fronts north of Moscow. At the end of November 1941 Wehrmacht troops approached Dmitrov from the west, from where they shelled the town. A group of enemy tanks broke through to Dmitrov from the direction of Yakhroma, but were defeated by the fire of Soviet army.

Owing to its steep slopes, extended for 2 kilometres (1.2 mi) along the canal, the height of more than 50 metres (160 ft) above it, it overhangs the Yakhroma bridge. Due to its length and steep slopes, the height gives the impression of not one, but several heights, which is why this place is called "Peremilovsky Heights". The opposite, western bank of the channel, is a gentle, long ascent. From this location, the advancing enemy looks like it could fit "in the palm of your hand". It is an object of Russian cultural heritage.

== History ==
The village of Peremilovo is the former residence of General S. S. Apraksin. On the territory of the settlement there is the Church of the Dormition of the Theotokos built in 1792, the author of the project was probably Francesco Camporesi.

At the end of November 1941 the front line approached the line of the Moscow-Volga Canal. German planes began to fly over the towns of Dmitrov and Yakhroma. The evacuation of enterprises and institutions began, patrols of the fighter battalion appeared on the streets. The population participated in the construction of defensive structures: trenches, anti-tank ditches and barriers.

On November 26-27, 1941 the Wehrmacht troops approached Yakhroma and Krasnaya Polyana. By that time the population of Yakhroma had already been evacuated. The front zone was the route of the canal from the Turist station (south of Yakhroma) to the Ivankovo reservoir.

The Moscow Canal (then known as the Moscow-Volga Canal) was opened a few years before the war. It was a vital water, energy and transportation artery for Moscow. Along its banks ran highways and railroads. The canal itself and even the barges sailing along it were not bombed.

In order to prevent the enemy forces from using the canal and the adjacent roads for their own purposes, the control towers at the adjacent third and fourth locks of the canal, the railroad bridge between the stations of Yakhroma and Turist, and the Rogachevsky road bridge in Dmitrov were blown up. The trusses of the bridges fell into the canal bed, blocking it. The only remaining road bridge in the area was the one near Yakhroma, which stretched for more than 50 meters along the left bank of the canal for several kilometers.

The Moscow canal (an additional barrier to the enemy) was visible from the height. Just below the height, along the eastern bank of the canal were seen the highway to Dmitrov, the railroad, then the road bridge over the canal, and on the opposite bank — the town of Yakhroma, an important defense center.

The battles for the Perimilovsky Heights took place on November 28-29, 1941. On November 28, around 07:00, 12-15 tanks and one or two companies of enemy infantry attacked the left flank company of the 2nd Battalion of the 29th Rifle Brigade defending the western outskirts of Yakhroma. The company, which had no anti-tank weapons, including hand grenades, could not withstand the tank attack. The German army captured Yakhroma and rushed to the village of Peremilovo.

On the bridge over the canal the Germans landed a paratrooper in Red Army uniforms. The paratroopers removed the sentries guarding the bridge. As a result, a group of German tanks entered the Moscow Canal. As a result, a group of German tanks forced the Moscow Canal, the enemy gained a foothold on its eastern bank, took Peremilovo and continued to pursue the retreating troops. Armored vehicles moved in the direction of Dmitrov. The Germans reached the easternmost point of the offensive north of Moscow.

The Red Army soldiers of the 3rd battalion of the 29th rifle brigade under the command of Lieutenant G. Lermontov stood in the way of the enemy. The battle of several fighters with two guns, covering the retreat of the troops, began against 14 enemy tanks accompanied by infantry. One of the guns ran out of shells, it became silent. German military steel intensified machine-gun fire. Political officer Mityashev tried to break through to the boxes with shells, but was hit by a machine-gun burst. According to the memoirs of N. M. Belyavtsev, someone from the calculation said: "- We'll be captured now! - Captivity is like death! Fire! - cried Lermontov. And this order left us no time to think. As if under hypnosis, I was thrown behind the shield of the cannon. Pulling up the shrapnel boxes was a matter of seconds. The gun came to life!"

There were no military units in Dmitrov, but the NKVD armored train No. 73 (sent from Verbilki) commanded by Captain Malyshev managed to delay the enemy's advance. It was the first to engage the enemy who had broken through to the canal. During the three-hour battle the armored train repulsed five attacks of the enemy. (According to the maps, it is possible that the attack was carried out by the Soviet 50th Rifle Brigade, and the counterattacks were carried out by the 29th Rifle Brigade, which occupied the outskirts of Dmitrov).

The commander of the First Shock Army, Lieutenant-General Kuznetsov V. I., was at that time in Dmitrov. In a telephone conversation with him, Supreme Commander-in-Chief Stalin demanded to "drive back the invaders behind the canal".

The 1st Shock Army was formed on November 25, 1941 by the order of the Stavka of the Supreme High Command dated November 15, 1941 "by transforming the 19th Army of the 2nd Formation, which was in the reserve of the VGK Stavka". As a matter of fact, the history of the formation of the army can be well told by the inhabitants of Sergiev Posad and Dmitrov districts, from which the 1st Shock Army was formed (as well as by local historians). And it was formed here, in fact, on the front line - near Sergiev Posad (then Zagorsk). About how in a hurry there was a draft of the local population, accelerated training and how the hastily formed on foot, literally, in a few days went to the front. On November 29, the army consisted of 7 separate rifle brigades (including, 29th, 44th, 47th, 50th, 55th, 56th and 71st), 11 separate ski battalions, 701st gun artillery regiment and 2 light bomber regiments.

According to the memoirs of Colonel Kuznetsov, son of the commander of the 1st Shock Army, Vasily Kuznetsov "was not on the list of candidates for the post of commander of the 1st Shock Army. He was in the hospital when the candidates were discussed. Vasily Ivanovich was summoned directly from the hospital to the Stavka, where Stalin personally announced his appointment as commander. "Well, are you satisfied with the appointment?" asked Stalin. "Satisfied, only the army is very lumpy: only ski battalions, only one division ... And what a fool canceled the corps!" (After the troops under Kuznetsov's command took the Reichstag and hoisted the victory banner over it, Stalin suddenly returned to this conversation: "Remember how you called me a fool then?" Contrary to expectations, no punitive measures were taken. On the contrary, Stalin expressed his gratitude for both the Battle of Moscow and the capture of the Reichstag, for which Kuznetsov was awarded the title of Hero of the Soviet Union).

While Kuznetsov had at his disposal in this area only one rifle brigade, stretching more than ten kilometers along the front, Dmitrov construction battalion, armored train NKVD № 73 and a division of "Katyusha" with one ammunition. Kuznetsov decided to attack the enemy, who had occupied Peremilovo, with such completely inadequate forces. The Katyushas came to Dmitrov and gave a volley.

The counter-attack of the 29th Rifle Brigade, which began at about 14:00, was unsuccessful. Using infantry and mainly tank fire, the enemy stopped the advancing units 300 meters from the eastern outskirts of Peremilov and forced them to retreat to the initial position. The ski battalion managed to reach the eastern bank of the canal on the left flank, knocking out small enemy units from two villages.

On the morning of November 29, after waiting for reinforcements, Peremilov's attack was repeated. It was scheduled for 6 o'clock in the morning. Stealthily approaching under the cover of darkness with the enemy at a distance of 150-200 meters, parts of the 29th and 50th Rifle Brigades under the command of Colonel Subbotin, commander of the 50th Rifle Brigade, suddenly attacked and broke into the village. Having lost several dozen soldiers (up to a company) of the 14th Motorized Division and 20 tanks of the 7th Armored Division, the enemy retreated in disorder to the western bank of the canal across the bridge and dug in. A lightning attack on Moscow from the north was thwarted.

At the end of December 1941 in the article "Exemplary artillerymen" the newspaper "To defeat the enemy" wrote about these events that the guns under the command of Lieutenant Lermontov fired more than four hundred shells. The barrel of the new gun became so hot that all the paint burned off. About two hundred corpses of German soldiers were left on the battlefield...

In order to create additional obstacles for the advancing enemy, it was decided to blow up the bridge over the canal, which was located on the neutral strip and was under fire from both sides. A group of 13 engineers was sent to accomplish this task. Only one survived. The task was accomplished.

But there was still a chance to force the canal on ice. It was freezing at -20-30°C. The ice was solid. With the help of sluices some of the water from the canal was released into the Yakhroma River. An airless space was formed under the ice. The tanks tried to cross the ice of the canal, but fell through the ice under which there was no water. (According to other reports, the ice itself broke through). Then the water was let back in and it broke the rest of the ice. The channel became a water barrier 80 meters wide. The floodplain of the Yakhroma and Sestra rivers was flooded for many kilometers and became an additional barrier to the enemy's advance.

The defense on the line along the eastern bank of the Moscow Canal was occupied by the 30th (north of Dmitrov) and the 1st Strike Army (Dmitrov and south). Participants in the battles testify that in addition to regular Red Army units, standing shoulder to shoulder at the height and dying were Moscow militia and marines formed from sailors who had come ashore. Their black coats and dark overcoats stood out in the snow. Not particularly prepared in general military terms, they went into the attack at full height. After the battle, the whole field was usually strewn with black silhouettes on the white snow.

They were opposed by 56mk (37 md, 14 md, 7 td) and 41mk (6 td, 1 td, 23 pd). Right in front of Dmitrov there were 14 md Germans and in front of the Yakhrom bridge — 7 td.

From December 1 to December 5, 1 UA and 20 A attacked at the intersection of 1 td and 7 td Germans (in Bornosovo), from the area of Dedenevo (south of Yakhroma, on the western bank of the canal) in the direction of Fedorovka, in the defense around which was half-enveloped 133 Soviet Rifle Division. The front stabilized, only an artillery duel across the canal was in progress.

And the next day, December 6, the Battle of Moscow began, Soviet troops went on the offensive along the entire front near Moscow. Only 10 days after the Wehrmacht troops broke through, on December 8, Yakhroma was liberated. And on December 10, the entire Dmitrov district was liberated. This was the first turning point in the whole war.

It was from here that the Soviet troops commanded by Rokossovsky and Lelyushenko launched the victorious counteroffensive aimed at Moscow.

=== Recent history ===
By the Decree of the President of the Russian Federation Dmitry Medvedev № 1534 of 28.10.2008 the town of Dmitrov was given the honorary title of the town of military glory "for courage, bravery and mass heroism of the defenders of the town".

On May 1, 2020 the town of Yakhroma was awarded the honorary title of Moscow Region "City of Military Glory".

== Memorial ==
On December 6, 1966, on the occasion of the 25th anniversary of the Battle of Moscow, a monument was erected right at the height, at the very top — a bronze soldier rushing to the attack with a PPSh rifle raised above his head in his hand on a high gray pedestal with bas-reliefs. Sculptors A. Postol, V. Glebov, N. Lyubimov, V. Fedorov, architects Y. Krivushchenko, A. Kaminsky, I. Stepanov, engineer S. Khadjibaronov worked on this memorial. The total height of the monument is 28 meters (15 meters pedestal and 13 meters bronze figure of a warrior).

One of its authors, Alexei Postol, used to draw since his childhood, graduated from school with honors and came to Moscow, where he became a student at the Mechanical and Mathematical Faculty of Moscow State University. He graduated in advance. But the war began. He went to the front and was wounded. That's when he heard about the heroic deed of 28 Panfilov's men near Moscow and decided that when the time came, he would erect a monument in their honor. Once, seeing young people with sketchbooks, Alexei learned that they were students of the Institute of Decorative and Applied Arts. And he decided to study here. It was explained to him that it is difficult to study in two universities at the same time. But he did not give up. His final projecto was a monument to the heroes of Panfilov, but his first monument was a bronze soldier with a machine gun in his hand on Perimilovsky Heights.

The bronze figure of the soldier was made in Leningrad at the Monumental Sculpture Plant, the relief was made in Mytishchi, and the granite was brought from Ukraine. The statue arrived in disassembled form and was assembled on site. The machinery could hardly get up the hill and there were doubts, whether the statue would not topple over.

The monument is visible from the highway on the western and eastern banks of the canal, from the bridge over the canal and from the railway. The monument is located on the western outskirts of the village of Peremilovo, where there is almost direct access to the complex. The Perimilovsky Heights offers a beautiful view of the town of Yakhroma, located at the foot of the hill, and the surrounding area.

The hill itself is a long and high slope with a fairly steep angle of inclination. For a more comfortable ascent on foot from the Yakhroma side, zigzag paths are laid out on the slope, with small observation platforms on the way up. Otherwise, it is almost impossible to climb the slope in a straight line. In about the third, lower part of the slope there is also a large platform for visitors, on the northern side of which there is a large granite pedestal on which is carved a five-word poem by Robert Rozhdestvensky, written especially at the request of the residents of Yakhroma:

Remember:

From this threshold.

In an avalanche of blood, misery and smoke,

It's where the road began in the forty-first

To the victorious the forty-fifth.

For a long time the monument was the only one in Russia where the name of General Andrey Vlasov was engraved. In May 2020, the name of General Vlasov was removed from the commemorative plaque.

== See also ==
- Klin-Solnechnogorsk defensive operation
- Kalinin defense operation

== Bibliography ==
- Города Подмосковья. Book 2. — М.: Московский рабочий, 1980. — 608 p., illustrations. — 35 000 copies.
- Карасев В. С. Яхромский мост. Очерк боёв за ноябрь—декабрь 1941 года. — М.: Дрофа, 2008. — 256 p. — 2000 copies. — ISBN 978-5-358-06299-3.
- Памятный ансамбль у Яхромы // Подвиг народа : Памятники Великой Отечественной войны, 1941—1945 гг. / Сост. и общ. ред. В. А. Голикова. — М. : Политиздат, 1980. — P. 25—26. — 318 p.
