= Iksha =

Iksha Икша
- Urban-type settlement
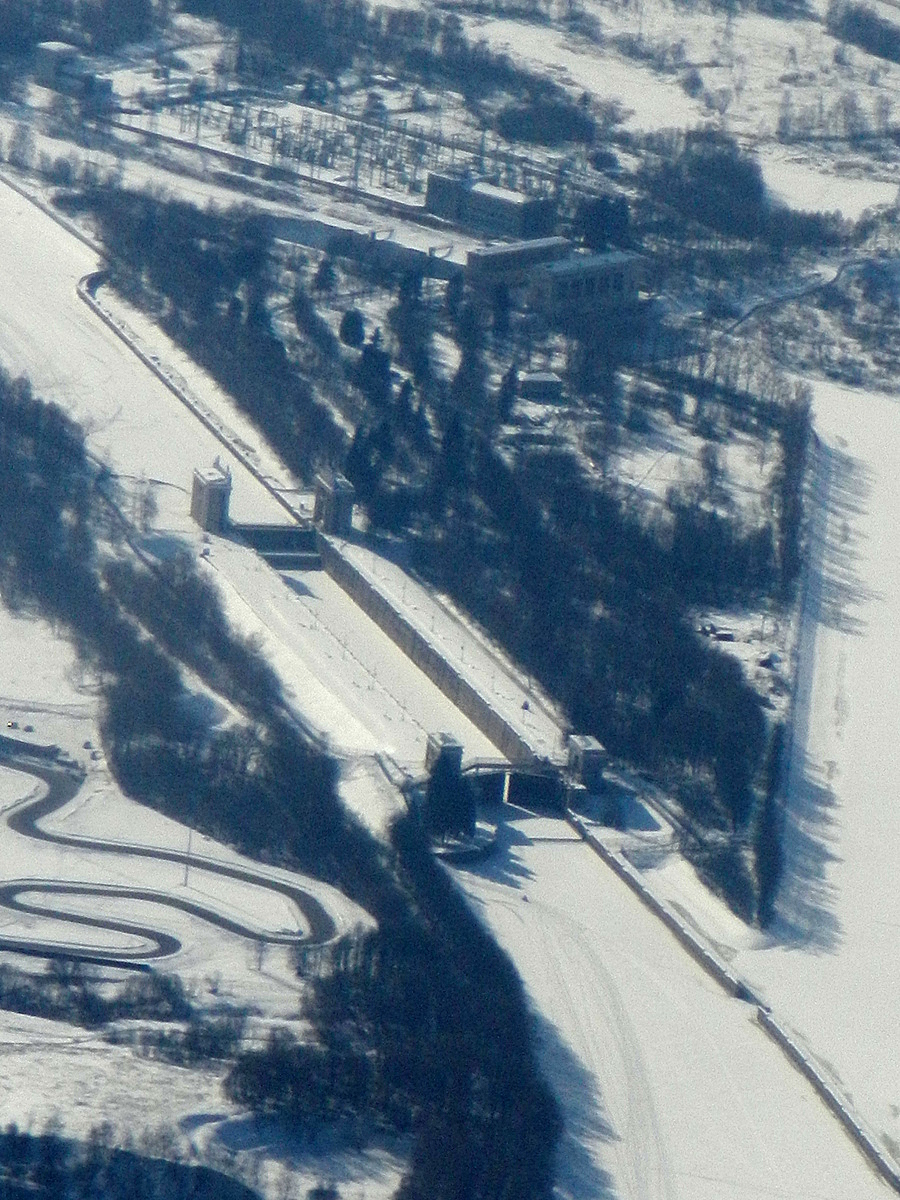
- Iksha canal locks, seen from the air, in March 2012

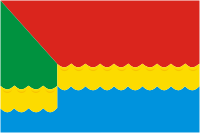
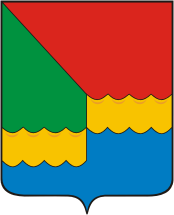
- Flag Coat of arms
- Interactive map of Iksha
- Location of Iksha Iksha (Moscow Oblast)
- Coordinates: 56°10′20″N 37°30′00″E
- Country: Russia
- Federal subject: Moscow Oblast
- Administrative district: Dmitrovsky District

Population (2010 Census)
  - Total: 3,721
  - Estimate (2025): 3,886 (+4.4%)
- Time zone: UTC+3 (MSK)
- Postal code: 141860
- OKTMO ID: 46608157051

Iksha (Russian: И́кша) is an urban locality (a work settlement) in Dmitrovsky District of Moscow Oblast, Russia, located 45 kilometers (28 mi) north of Moscow along the Dmitrov highway and the Moscow Canal, and is a junction of the Savyolovo Railway. Population: 3,721 (2010 census); 3,738 (2002 census); 4,619 (1989 Soviet census).

The settlement was founded during the construction of the railroad from Moscow to Dmitrov in 1889. It further developed due to the construction of the Moscow Canal in the 1930s. The main point of interest is a cascade of Moscow Canal locks on the Iksha Reservoir built in Socialist Classicism style.
