= Rybinsk (disambiguation) =

Rybinsk is a city in Yaroslav Oblast, Russia.

Rybinsk may also refer to:

- Rybinsk Urban Okrug, a municipal formation which the city of oblast significance of Rybinsk in Yaroslavl Oblast, Russia is incorporated as
- Rybinsk (inhabited locality), several inhabited localities in Russia
- Rybinsk Reservoir, a water reservoir on the Volga River, Russia
- Rybinsk Hydroelectric Station, a hydroelectric station on the Volga and Sheksna Rivers, Russia
- FSC Rybinsk (1937–2009), defunct association football team from Rybinsk, Russia
- HC Rybinsk, ice hockey team from Rybinsk, Russia
