= Russian Hockey Second League =

Vtoraya Liga
- Countries: Russia
- Divisions: 2
- No. of teams: 18
- Promotion to: First League

The Second League (Russian: Вторая лига, translit. Vtoraya Liga, also seen as RUS-4) was an ice hockey league in Russia. It was a fourth level league in the Russian ice hockey and it was divided into a two Divisions.

== Teams ==
Team during the 2008-2009 Season.

Central Division

- HC Vladimir, Vladimir
- HC Rys-2-OGU, Odintsovo
- MHC Krylya Sovetov-2, Moscow
- HC Lipetsk-2, Lipetsk
- HC Dmitrov-2, Dmitrov
- HC Ryazan-2, Ryazan
- Kristall Elektrostal-2, Elektrostal
- HC Rybinsk, Rybinsk
- Titan Klin-2, Klin
- SDYUSHOR Tver, Tver

Ural Division

- Vagonostrointel Ust-Katav, Ust-Katav
- Politekhnik Chelyabinsk, Chelyabinsk
- Inkvoi Sovetsky, Sovetsky
- Gazovik-Start Yalutorovsk, Yalutorovsk
- Kedr Novouralsk-2, Novouralsk
- Yurmaty Salavat, Salavat
- Signal Chelyabinsk, Chelyabinsk
- Zauralie Kurgan-2, Kurgan
