= Savyolovo railway station =

Railway station in Tver Oblast, Russia

Savyolovo Савёлово
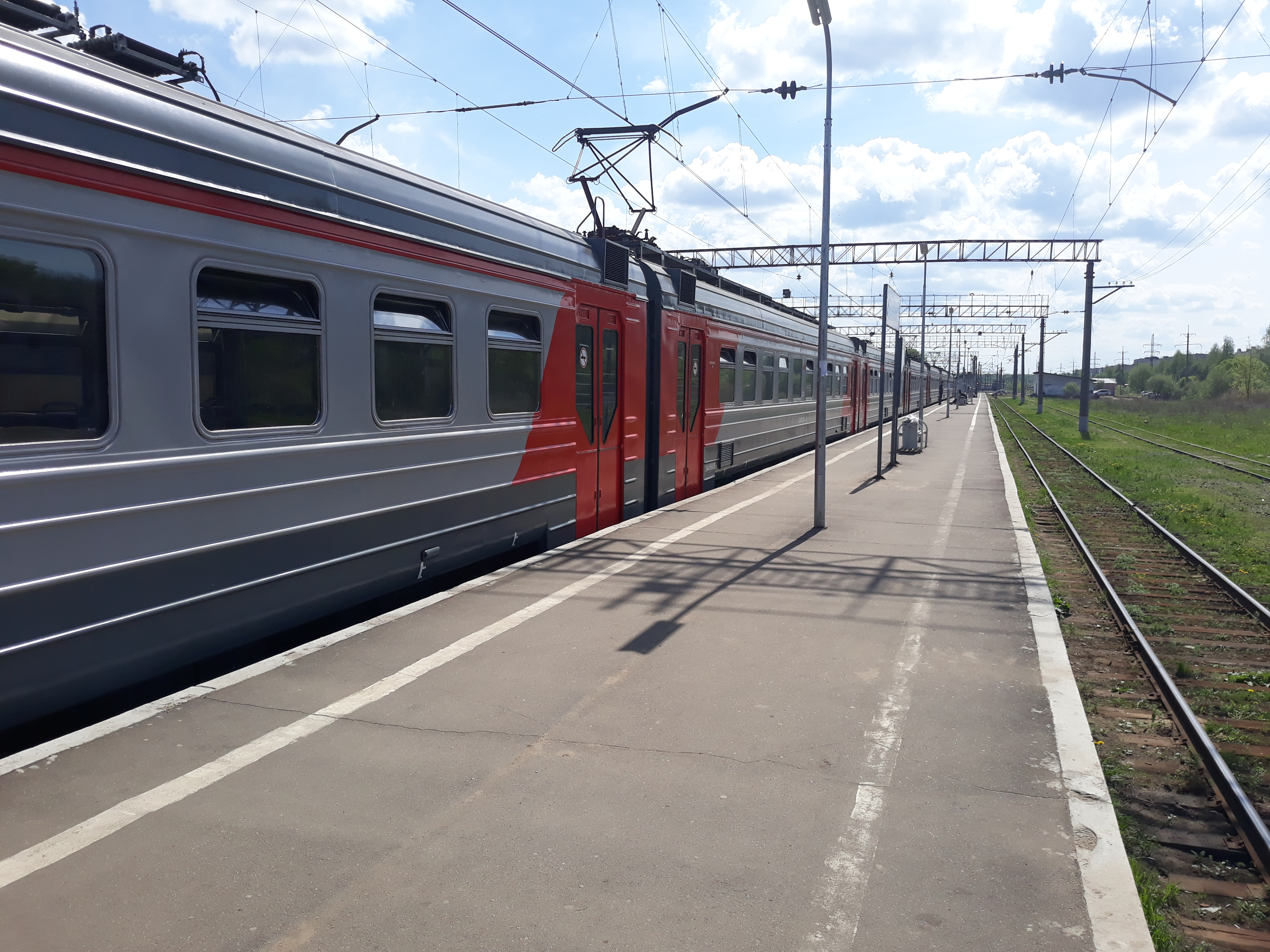
- Savyolovo railway platform in 2019

General information
- Location: Savyolovo, Kimry; Tver Oblast; Russia
- Coordinates: 56.8559°N 37.3765°E
- Owner: Russian Railways
- Operator: October Railway
- Platforms: 3
- Tracks: 6

Construction
- Structure type: At-grade

History
- Opened: 1900

Services
| Preceding station | Russian Railways | Following station |
|---|---|---|
| 124 km towards Moscow Savyolovsky | Savyolovsky Suburban | Terminus |
Location

Savyolovo (Russian: Савёлово) is a railway station located in Savyolovo, Kimry, Tver Oblast in Russia. The station was intended to serve the town of Kimry, with which Savyolovo eventually merged, on the opposite bank of the river. The name of the terminus, Savyolovo, became the name of the Savyolovsky Suburban Line of the October Railway, as well as its Moscow terminus, Moscow Savyolovsky railway station.

== History ==
The station was opened in 1900 on a new direct line which linked Moscow and Rybinsk. The expansion of the railway network in Russian from the 1850s had left the Upper Volga region largely unconnected. This was a particular issue in Rybinsk, the point on the Volga where the river becomes unnavigable to large barges. Goods from Astrakhan and locations further down the Volga had to be transferred to punts and sent up the Volga, Mologa and Sheksna rivers. A railway line between Rybinsk and Bologoye was opened in 1871, and expanded to link with new destinations and on to other lines. This was the forerunner of what in 1918 became the Upper Volga railway. In 1898 a new 55 km line opened from Savelino railway station to Kashin, and in 1899 a line from Savelino to Krasny Kholm railway station was inaugurated. Also in 1898 the Moscow-Yaroslavl Railway was opened. The railway was intended to link Savyolovo with Moscow, via the city of Dmitrov, at that time the only large settlement along the route. Despite the small passenger potential, the line was intended to transport goods transhipped from the Volga at Savyolovo for delivery to Moscow. It would also provide an alternative to the river route from Savyolovo to Rybinsk via Kalyazin and Uglich.

The new line reached Savyolovo in 1900, and the station was equipped with a water tower to supply locomotives making the journey. Trains initially used the company's Moscow Yaroslavsky railway station as their terminus, until the completion of a new Moscow terminus in 1902, Moscow Savyolovsky railway station. This completed a 130 km railway line linking Savyolovo with Moscow. With the completion of the route to Savyolovo, the management of the Moscow-Vindavo-Rybinsk Railway, which managed the lines around Rybinsk, drew up plans to link Rybinsk and Cherepovets with Savyolovo station via a branch through Uglich and Kalyazin. The Moscow-Yaroslavl Railway also intended to link the line on from Savyolovo to Kalyazin, and work began on routes to link Kashin and Kalyazin, and Krasny Kholm and Vesyegonsk, with the intention of then linking Cherepovets to Vesyegonsk. After the line from Kashin to Kalyazin was constructed, Savyolovo and the similarly named Savelino became part of the same line. To avoid confusion, the station and settlement at Savelino were renamed Sonkovo. Protracted disputes over the route and the towns it would serve delayed construction on these links for some time, and work was further delayed by the First World War. It was not until 1918 that the section of railway linking Savyolovo with Kalyazin opened. With the completion of other links about this time, the line now linked Moscow to Vesyegonsk via Savyolovo, traversing 375 km.

It was one of the quieter routes of the Russian Empire and early Soviet Union, and was referenced as such in Ilf and Petrov's 1928 work The Twelve Chairs, "The smallest number of people arrive in Moscow through Savelovsky. These are shoemakers from Taldom, residents of the city of Dmitrov, workers of the Yakhroma manufactory or a dull summer resident who lives in winter and summer at the Khlebnikovo station."

== Services ==
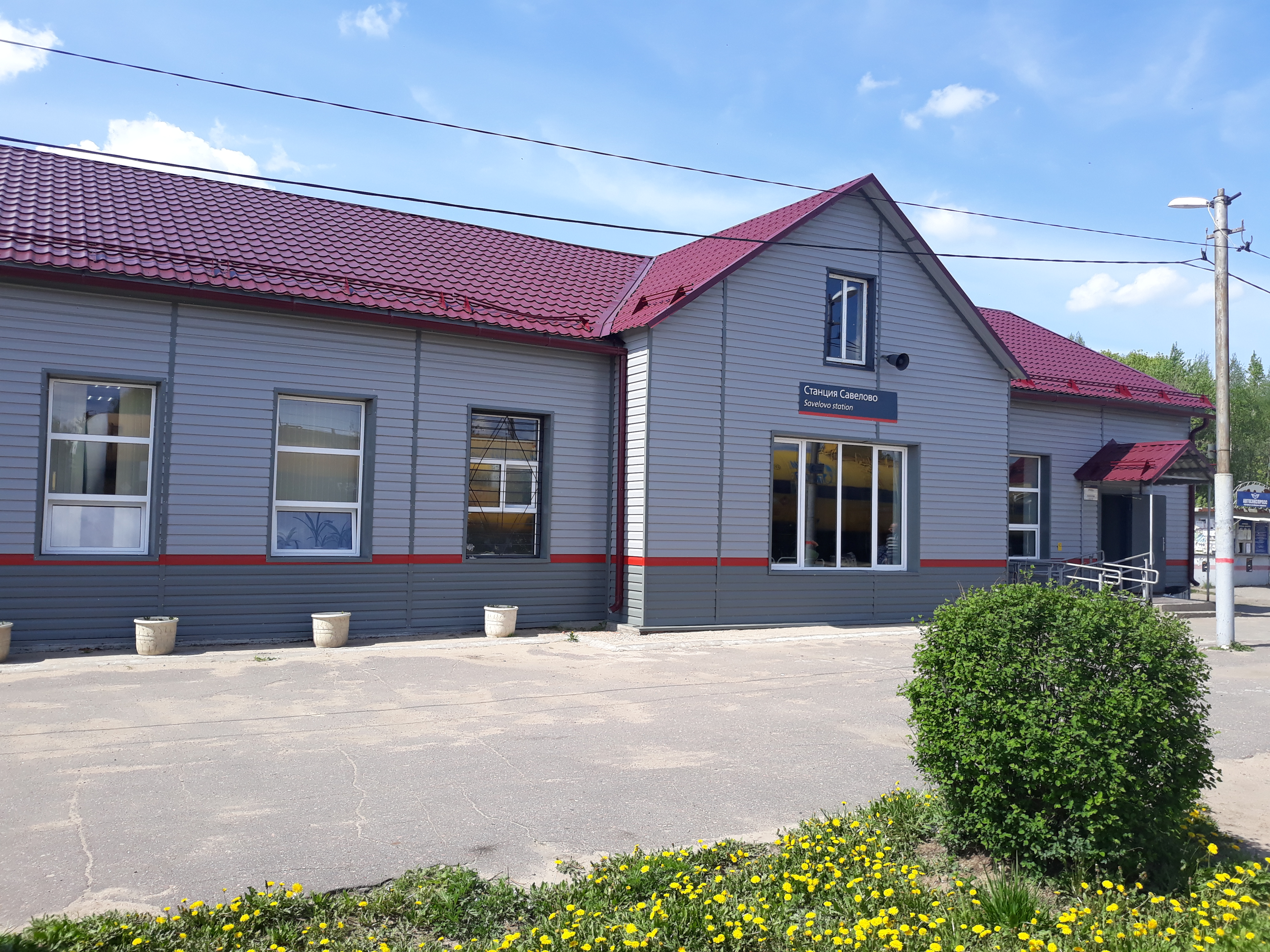
Savyolovo station in 2019

It is the northern terminus of the Savyolovsky suburban railway line from the Moscow Savyolovsky railway station via Dmitrov and Taldom. The long-distance trains connecting Moscow and Rybinsk also stop at this station.
