= Okruzhnaya railway station =

Railway station in Moscow, Russia

Okruzhnaya Окружная
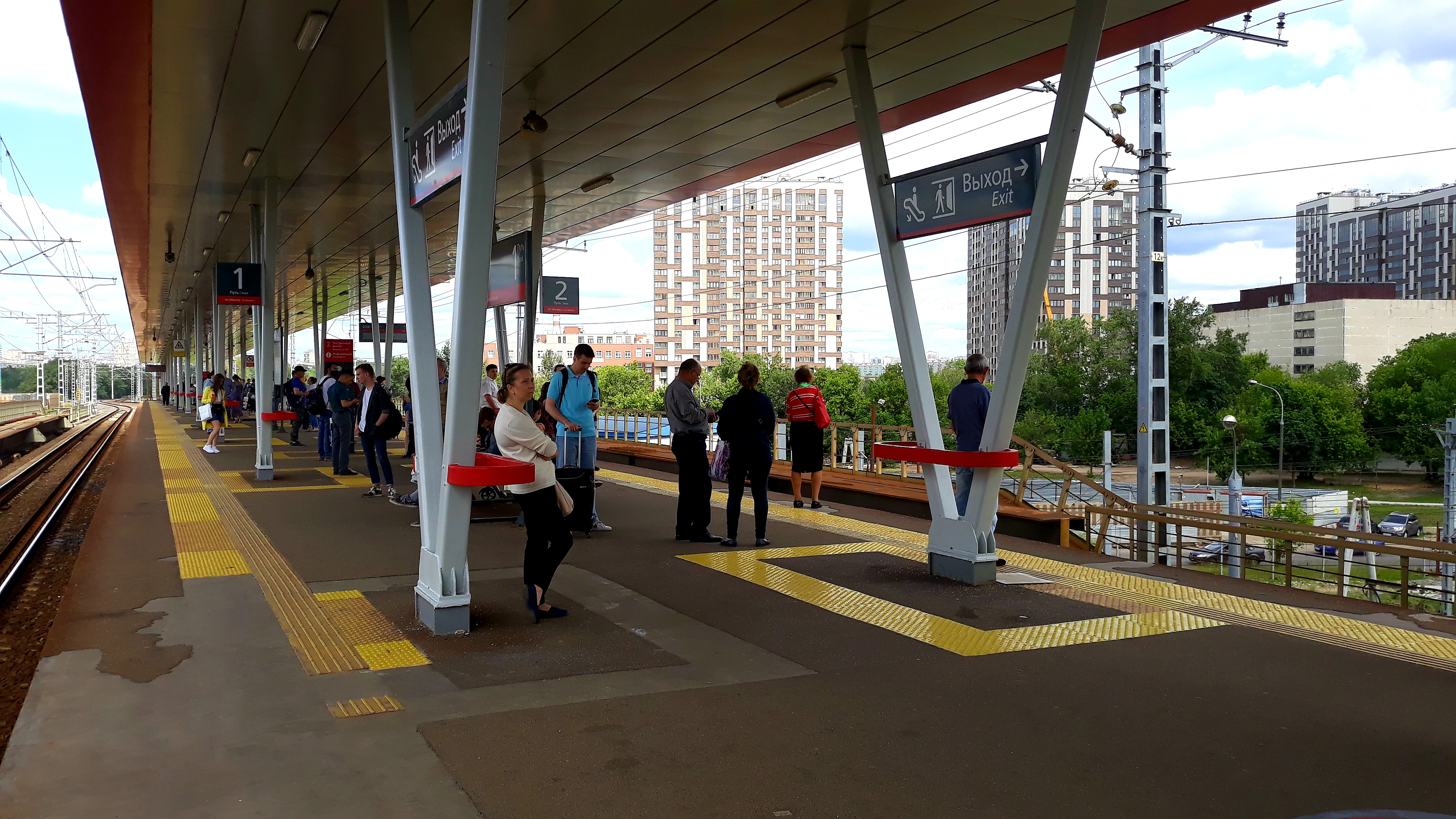
- New platform, opened in 2018

General information
- Coordinates: 55.848°N 37.574°E
- System: Moscow Railway platform
- Owner: Russian Railways
- Line: Savyolovsky Suburban Line
- Platforms: 1
- Tracks: 2
- Connections: Moscow Metro stations: Okruzhnaya; Okruzhnaya Bus: 24, 82, 85, 154, 238, 282, 692 Trolleybus: 36

Other information
- Station code: 196023
- Fare zone: 0

History
- Opened: 1911
- Rebuilt: 2018

Services
Preceding station	Aeroexpress	Following station
Moscow Savyolovsky towards Odintsovo	Odintsovo to Sheremetyevo Airport	Aeroport Sheremetyevo Terminus
Preceding station	Russian Railways	Following station
Timiryazevskaya towards Moscow Savyolovsky	Savyolovsky Suburban	Degunino towards Savyolovo
Preceding station	Moscow Central Diameters	Following station
Timiryazevskaya towards Odintsovo	Line D1	Degunino towards Lobnya
Location
- Location within Moscow Ring Road

Okruzhnaya (Russian: Окружная) is a railway station on the Savyolovsky suburban railway line originating at Moscow Savolovsky railway station. It opened in 1911, and was reconstructed in 2018, to allow better interchange with the Moscow Central Circle line.

Since September 2018, Aeroexpress trains to Sheremetyevo International Airport from Belorussky Railway Station have stopped at Okruzhnaya only for boarding to the airport and exit from the airport. Since November 2019, Aeroexpress trains operate as MCD service towards Odinsovo and on Aeroexpress fare towards Sheremetyevo Airport.

Future plans involve forming a single large interchange complex by combining this station with the similarly named stations of the Moscow Metro and the Moscow Central Circle.

== Gallery ==
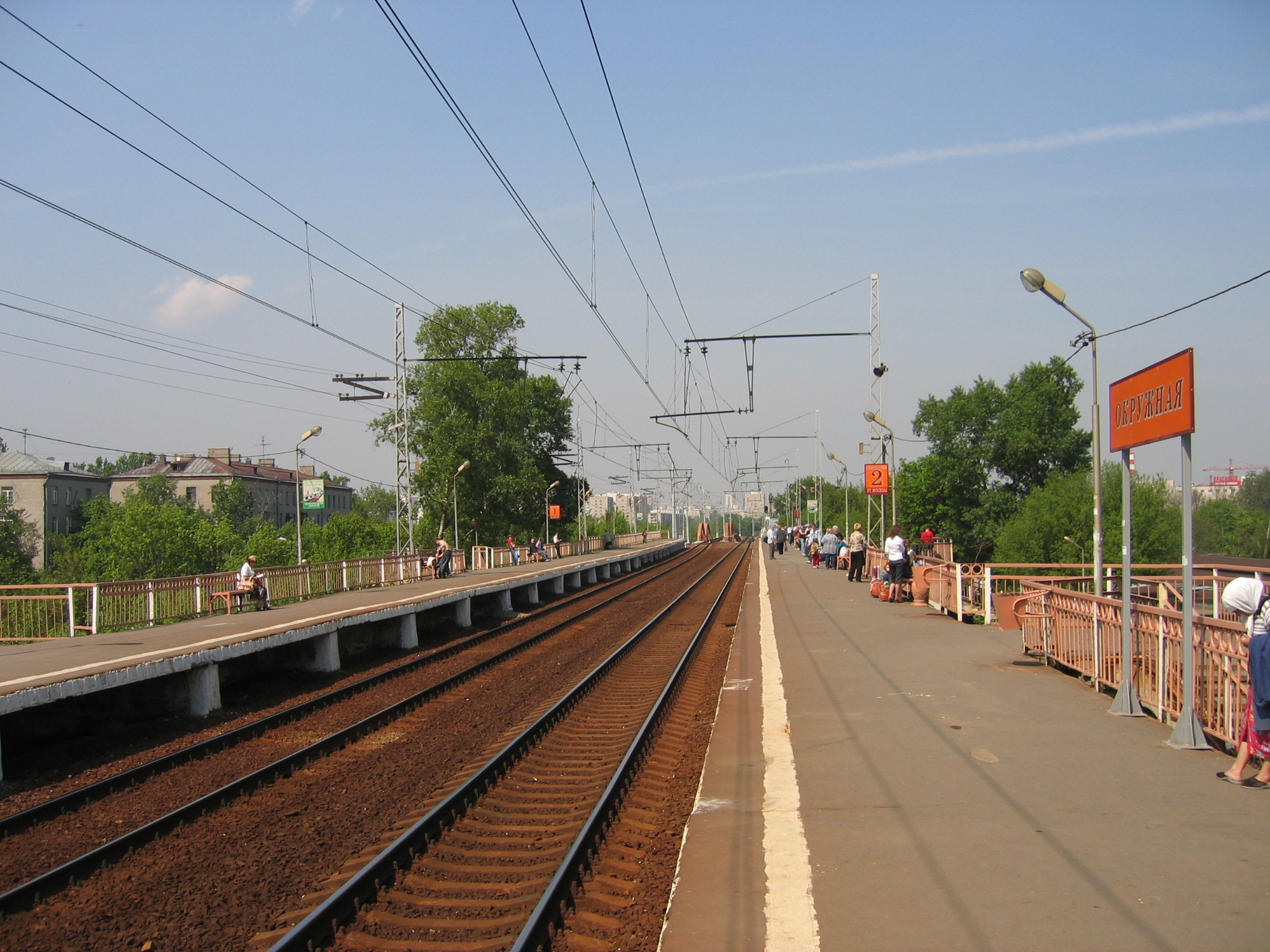
The old "Okruzhnaya" platform, before demolition in 2018

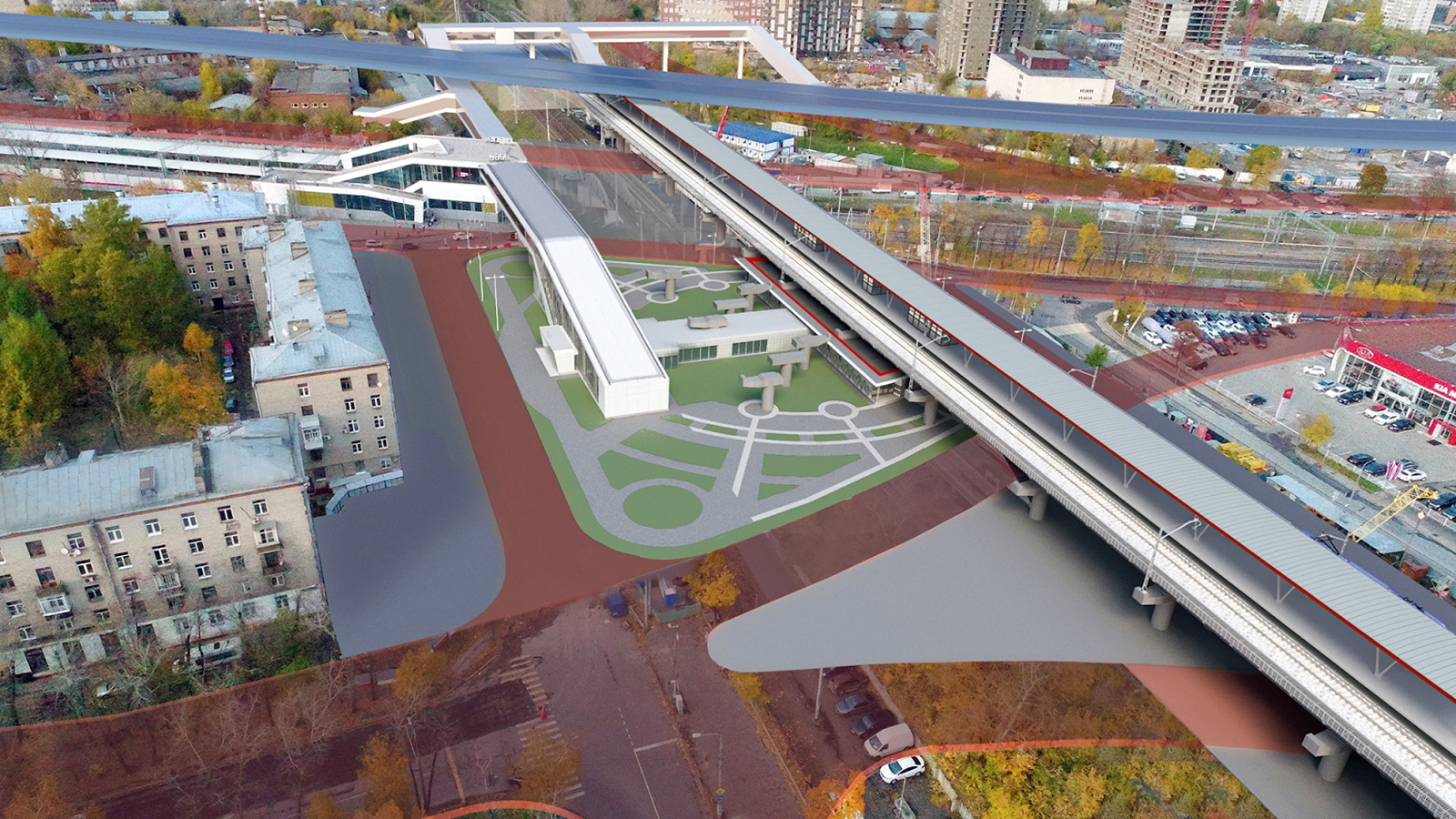
The Okruzhnaya Interchange project
