= HC Vladimir =

- City: Vladimir, Russia
- League: Vtoraya Liga; Pervaya Liga
- Founded: 2007
- Folded: 2011
- Home arena: Polaris Ice Palace
- Colours: Red, White, Black
- Website: Official website

HC Vladimir was an ice hockey team based in Vladimir, Russia. The team played in the Pervaya Liga, the then third level of Russian ice hockey and the Vtoraya Liga, the then fourth level of Russian ice hockey. They were founded in 2007 and folded in 2011 because of financial difficulties and disagreements with the Polaris Ice Palace.
