= Yakhroma =

Town in Moscow Oblast, Russia

Yakhroma Яхрома
- Town
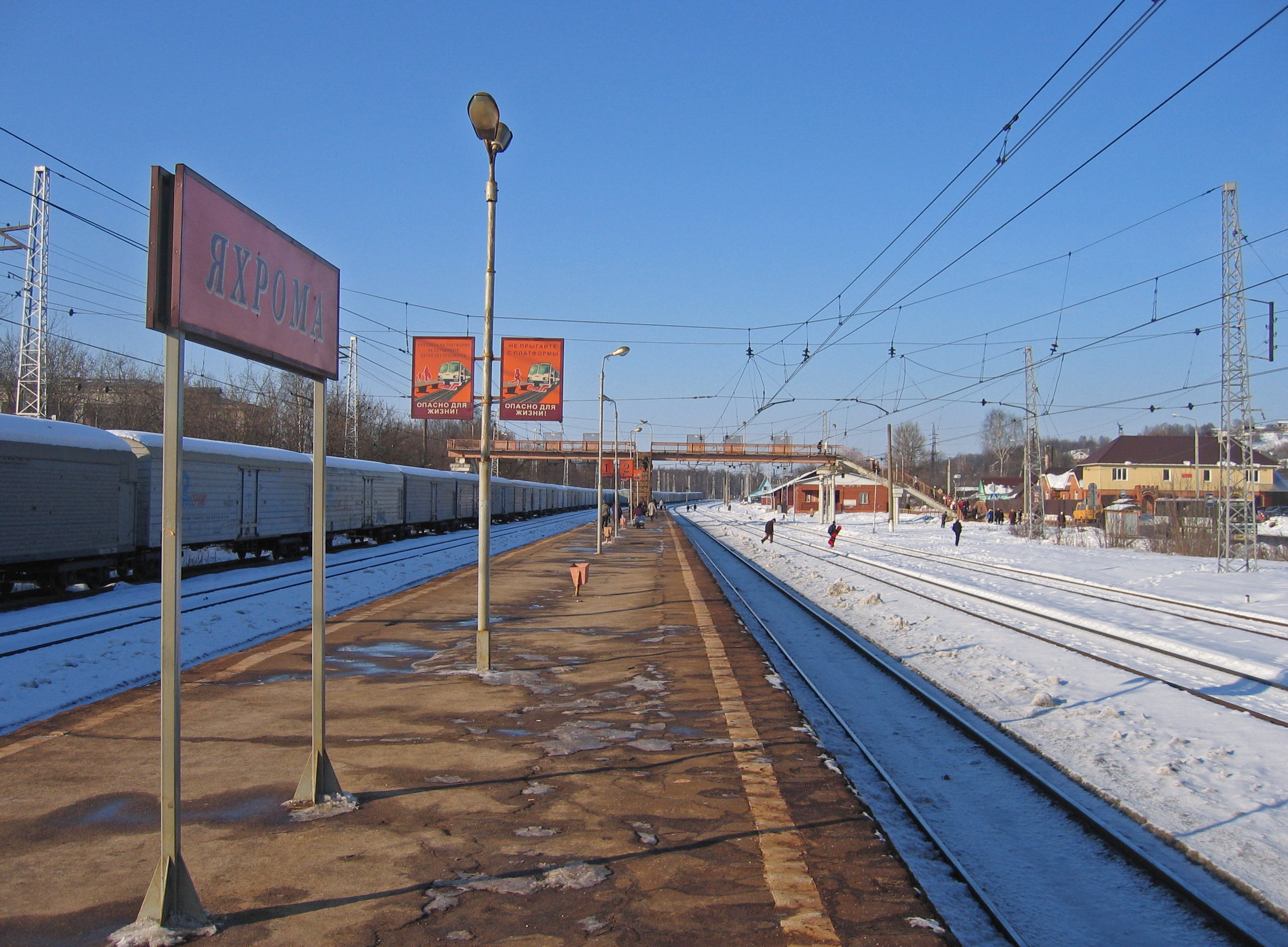
- Yakhroma railway station

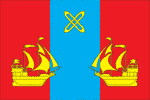
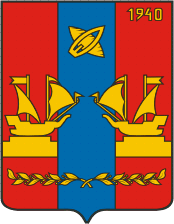
- Flag Coat of arms
- Interactive map of Yakhroma
- Location of Yakhroma Yakhroma (Moscow Oblast)
- Coordinates: 56°17′N 37°28′E
- Country: Russia
- Federal subject: Moscow Oblast
- Administrative district: Dmitrovsky District
- TownSelsoviet: Yakhroma
- Founded: 1841
- Town status since: 1940
- Elevation: 150 m (490 ft)

Population (2010 Census)
  - Total: 13,214
  - Estimate (2024): 13,618 (+3.1%)

Administrative status
  - Capital of: Town of Yakhroma

Municipal status
  - Municipal district: Dmitrovsky Municipal District
  - Urban settlement: Yakhroma Urban Settlement
  - Capital of: Yakhroma Urban Settlement
- Time zone: UTC+3 (MSK)
- Postal code: 141840
- OKTMO ID: 46515000006
- Website: www.yaxroma.ru

Yakhroma (Russian: Я́хрома) is a town in Dmitrovsky District of Moscow Oblast, Russia, located on the Yakhroma River, 55 kilometers (34 mi) north of Moscow. Population: 13,214 (2010 census); 13,361 (2002 census); 17,499 (1989 Soviet census).

== History ==
It was founded in 1841 as a settlement servicing a local textile factory on the Yakroma River. In 1901, a railway station, which later adopted the same name, was built near the settlement on the Moscow (Savyolovsky)–Kimry (Savyolovo) line. The settlement was granted town status in 1940. On 27 November 1941, the German Army briefly took the Moscow-Volga Bridgehead at Yakhroma's railway station a day after reaching the outskirts of Kashira.

== Administrative and municipal status ==
Within the framework of administrative divisions, it is, together with thirty-seven rural localities, incorporated within Dmitrovsky District as the Town of Yakhroma. As a municipal division, the Town of Yakhroma is incorporated within Dmitrovsky Municipal District as Yakhroma Urban Settlement.
