= Moscow Savyolovsky railway station =

Railway station in Moscow, Russia

Coordinates: 55°47′39″N 37°35′17″E

Moscow–Savyolovsky Москва–Савёловская
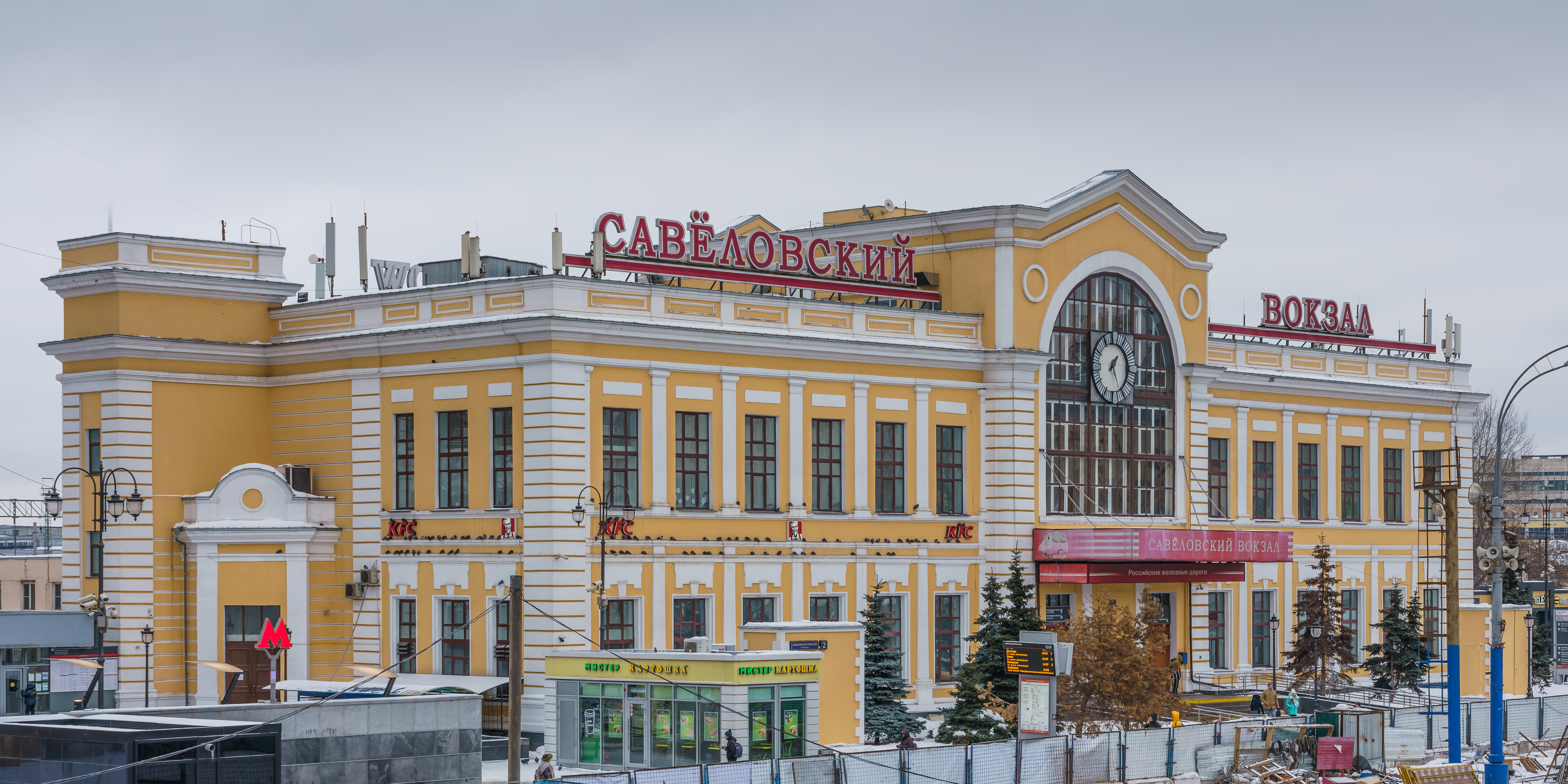
- View of the station's main entrance in 2019

General information
- Location: Savyolovsky Station Square, Maryina roshcha District, Moscow, Russia
- System: Moscow-Savyolovsky
- Owner: Russian Railways
- Operator: Moscow Railway
- Platforms: 6
- Tracks: 11
- Connections: Moscow Metro stations: Savyolovskaya; Savyolovskaya; Savyolovskaya; Savyolovskaya (under construction it will open on October 1, 2025); Bus: M10, T3, T29, T79, 22, 72, 82, 84, 87, 310, 384, 415, 727; Trolleybus: 42, 56

Construction
- Structure type: At-grade
- Parking: No

Other information
- Station code: 196004
- Fare zone: 0

History
- Opened: 1902
- Closed: 2029
- Rebuilt: 1981
- Former names: Butyrsky

Services
| Preceding station | Russian Railways | Following station |
|---|---|---|
| Terminus | Savyolovsky Suburban | Timiryazevskaya towards Savyolovo |
| Preceding station | Aeroexpress | Following station |
| Moscow Belorussky towards Odintsovo | Odintsovo to Sheremetyevo Airport | Okruzhnaya towards Aeroport Sheremetyevo |
| Preceding station | Moscow Central Diameters | Following station |
| Moscow Belorussky towards Odintsovo | Line D1 | Timiryazevskaya towards Lobnya |
Location
- Location within Moscow Ring Road

Savyolovsky station (Russian: Савёловский вокза́л, Savyolovsky vokzal), alternatively spelled Savyolovskiy, Savelovsky or Savelovskiy, is one of the ten main railway stations in the Maryina roshcha District of Moscow. It serves suburban directions north of the city. Its initial name was Butyrsky vokzal (the station itself is still called Moscow Butyrskaya) because of Butyrskaya Zastava Square, which also gave name to the nearby Butyrka prison.

== History ==
The station was built from 1897 to 1902, along a 130-kilometre (81 mi) long railway to the towns of Kashin, Kalyazin, Uglich, and Rybinsk. The modern name of the station originates from the name of a village Savyolovo (now a district of the town of Kimry) situated along the line.

As the line was built by a private company, the place of the rail station was initially built outside Moscow next to the outpost of Butyrka. Initially known as Butyrsky station, the station lacks the ornateness and grandeur of Moscow's other stations and consists of a central two-story section flanked by two single story wings. The station was inaugurated in a silver-trowel ceremony in spring 1902, an event which had direct consequences for the nearby peaceful rural areas as it dramatically increased investment and led to those areas being engulfed by the city.

When the station marked its 90th anniversary, it was internally redeveloped, expanded and restored adding a second floor and improving the quality of platforms. It was the last station to be connected to the Moscow Metro, with the Savyolovskaya metro station (opened in 1988).

== Services ==
=== Suburban destinations ===
As of 2011, the station operated only suburban commuter trains (elektrichka trains). The principal destinations are Dolgoprudny, Lobnya, Iksha, Yakhroma, Dmitrov, Taldom, Kimry (Savyolovo) and Dubna. There are express trains to Dubna, which also have stops at Dmitrov and Bolshaya Volga. While most trains, arriving from the north, terminate there, some trains proceed to the Belorussky railway station and in the western direction. The long-distance trains, which previously departed from the station, were moved to the Belorussky station.

=== Airport connections ===
From November 2004 to June 2007, an express train ran from the Savyolovsky station to Lobnya (about 30 min) that connected with buses or taxis for the 7 km trip to the two airport terminals at Sheremetyevo (about 15 min).

On 10 July 2008, a direct service from Savyolovsky station to a new railway station near Sheremetyevo Terminal 2 was inaugurated. Journeys take 35 minutes, and tickets cost 300 roubles (750 roubles for business class). The service is operated by Aeroexpress, a subsidiary of Russian Railways.

Starting from 30 May 2010, the stop on Savyolovsky station on line Belorussky railway station - Sheremetyevo was canceled.

=== Intercity bus connections ===
There is a bus terminal, in front of the station, serving Dmitrov, Dubna, Iksha, Kalyazin, Kashin, Kimry, Laryovo, Taldom and several other destinations north of Moscow.

== Gallery ==
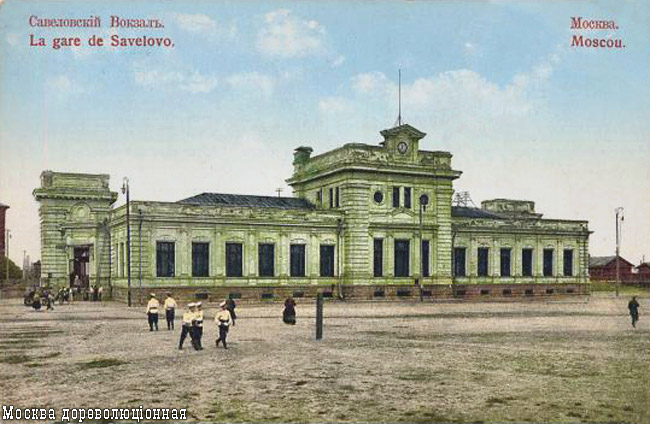
Historical view of the station (before 1917)

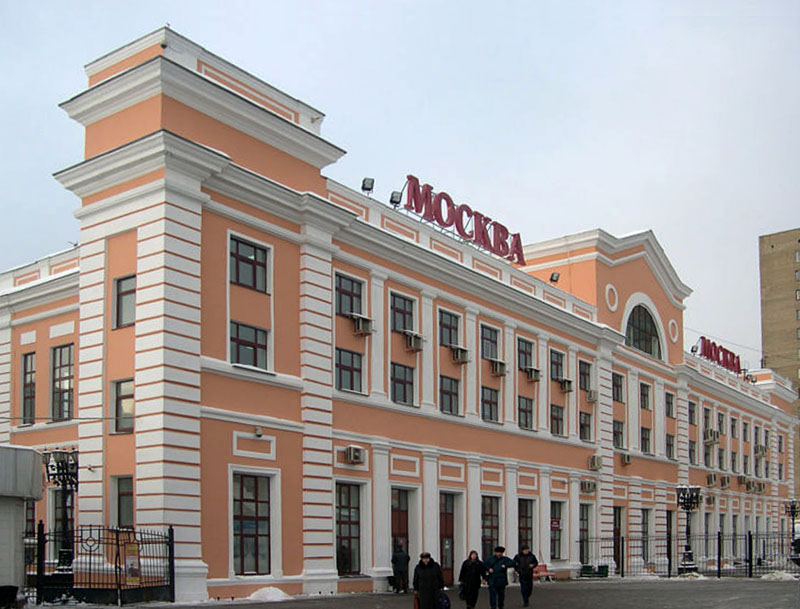
Trackside facade of the station

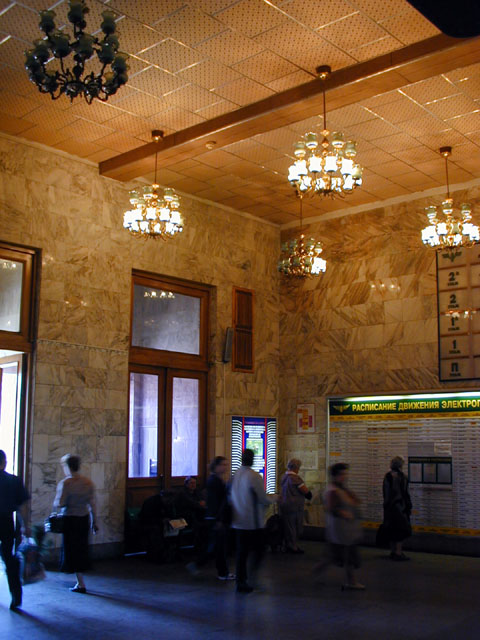
Station interior before 2000s reconstruction
