= Savyolovo =

Microdistrict of Kimry, Russia

Coordinates: 56°51′N 37°22′E

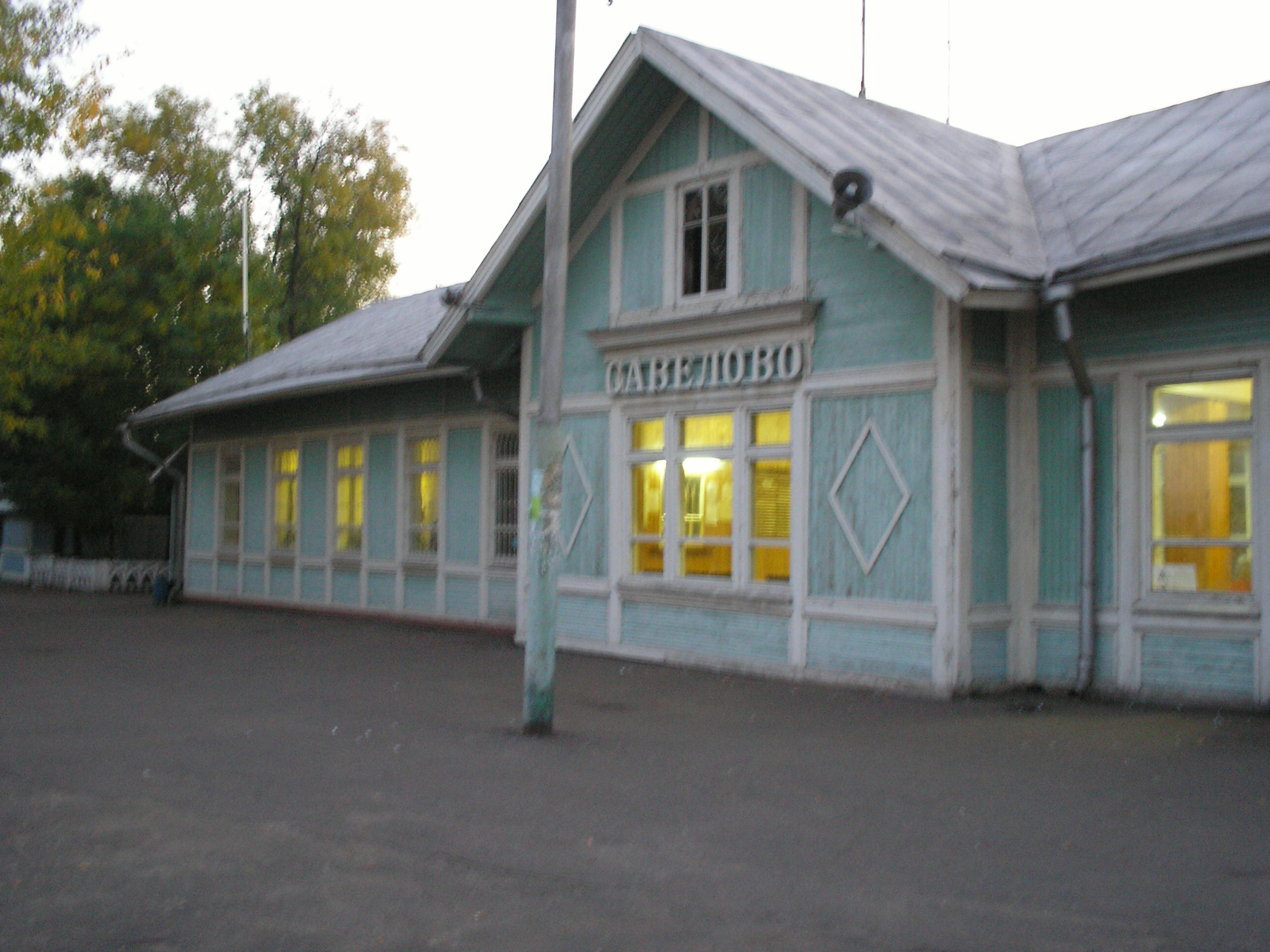
Savyolovo: the station building

Savyolovo (Russian: Савёлово) is a microdistrict of the town of Kimry in Tver Oblast, Russia. It lies on the right bank of the Volga River and is connected to the left-bank part of Kimry by a 554-metre-long (1,818 ft) bridge over the Volga (the longest bridge in Tver Oblast).

The expansion of the ancient village of Savyolovo at the beginning of the 20th century was due to the opening there in 1900 of a railway station on a new direct line to Moscow. The station was chiefly intended to serve the town of Kimry, with which Savyolovo eventually merged, on the opposite bank of the river.

== Railway station ==
The station is the northern terminus of the Savyolovsky suburban railway line from the Savyolovsky Rail Terminal in Moscow via Dmitrov and Taldom. Savyolovo has given its name to the line itself, as well as its terminus (Savyolovsky Terminal) and a number of related toponyms in Moscow (Savyolovskaya (Bolshaya Koltsevaya line), Savyolovskaya (Serpukhovsko–Timiryazevskaya line) Metro station, Savyolovsky market, etc.).

In the northern direction (i.e. opposite to Moscow direction) the railway serves mostly rural locations in Tver Oblast and Yaroslavl Oblast. From Savyolovo, two branches of rail lines continue further north (Savyolovo – Kashin – Sonkovo – Vesyegonsk) and northeast (Savyolovo – Kalyazin – Uglich).
