= Yurmaty Salavat =

Russian ice hockey team

- City: Salavat, Russia
- League: Pervaya Liga
- Founded: 2008
- Home arena: SKK Salavat
- Colours: Green, Blue, White

Yurmaty Salavat is an ice hockey team in Salavat, Russia. They were founded in 2008, and play in the Pervaya Liga, the third level of Russian ice hockey.
