= Rybinsk (inhabited locality) =

Rybinsk (Russian: Рыбинск) is the name of several inhabited localities in Russia.

Urban localities

- Rybinsk, a city in Yaroslavl Oblast

Rural localities

- Rybinsk, Irkutsk Oblast, a village in Tayshetsky District of Irkutsk Oblast
- Rybinsk, Novosibirsk Oblast, a village in Bolotninsky District of Novosibirsk Oblast; 55°52′N 84°18′E
- Rybinsk, Tomsk Oblast, a settlement in Verkhneketsky District of Tomsk Oblast
