= HC Rybinsk =

- City: Rybinsk, Russia
- Founded: 1959
- Colours: Blue, white, red

Franchise history
- 1959-present: HC Rybinsk

HC Rybinsk (Russian: ХК Рыбинск) is an ice hockey team in Rybinsk, Russia.

== History ==
The club was founded in 1959.

Their greatest achievement was being promoted to the Vysshaya Ligs for the 2003-04 season. They finished in 16th and last place in the Western Conference during their only season in the Vysshaya Liga. The club went down to the fourth-level Russian league, the Vtoraya Liga, for the following season.
