= Dmitrovsky District, Moscow Oblast =

Dmitrovsky District Дмитровский район (Russian)
- District
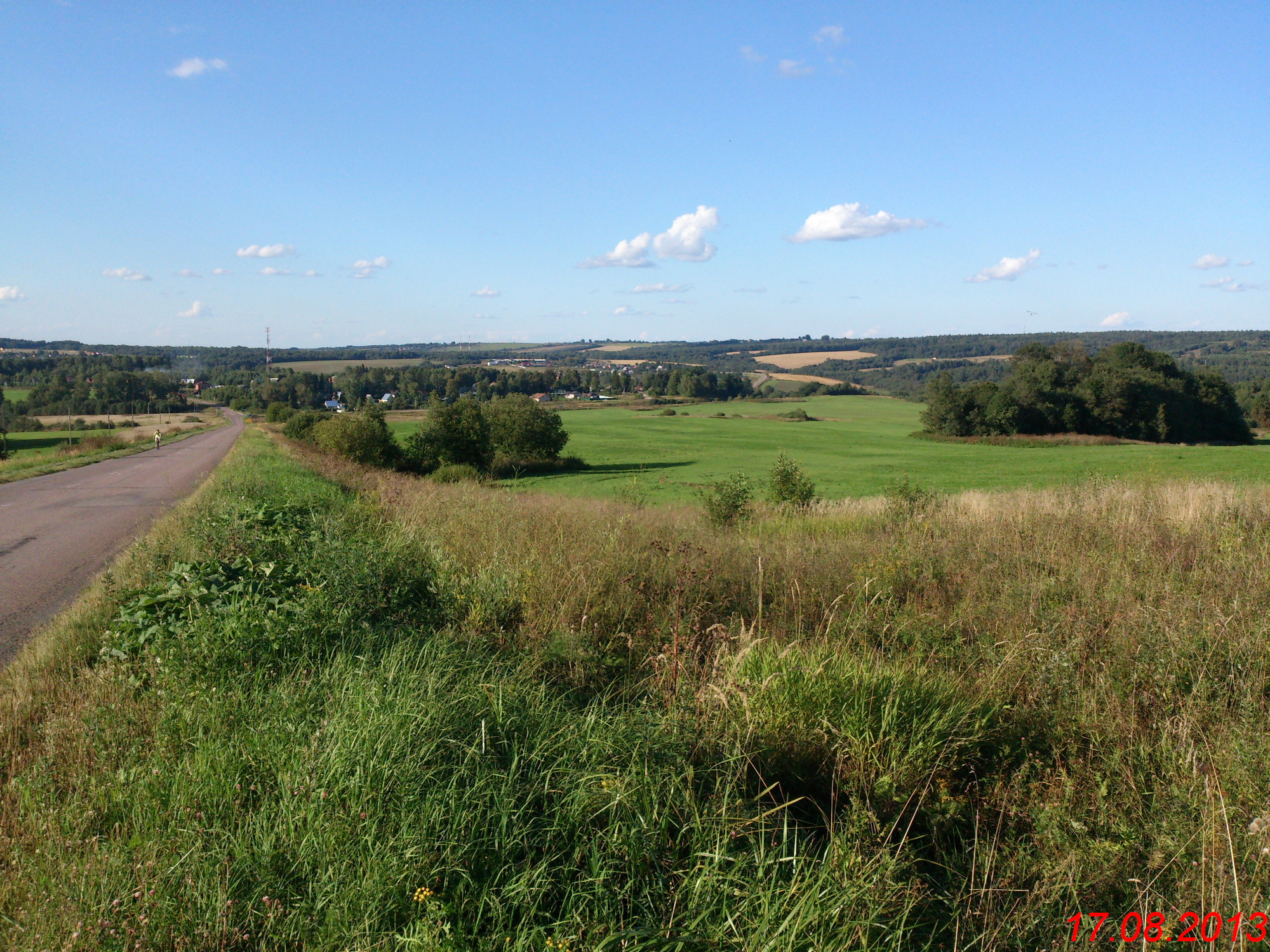
- Kikino, Dmitrovsky District

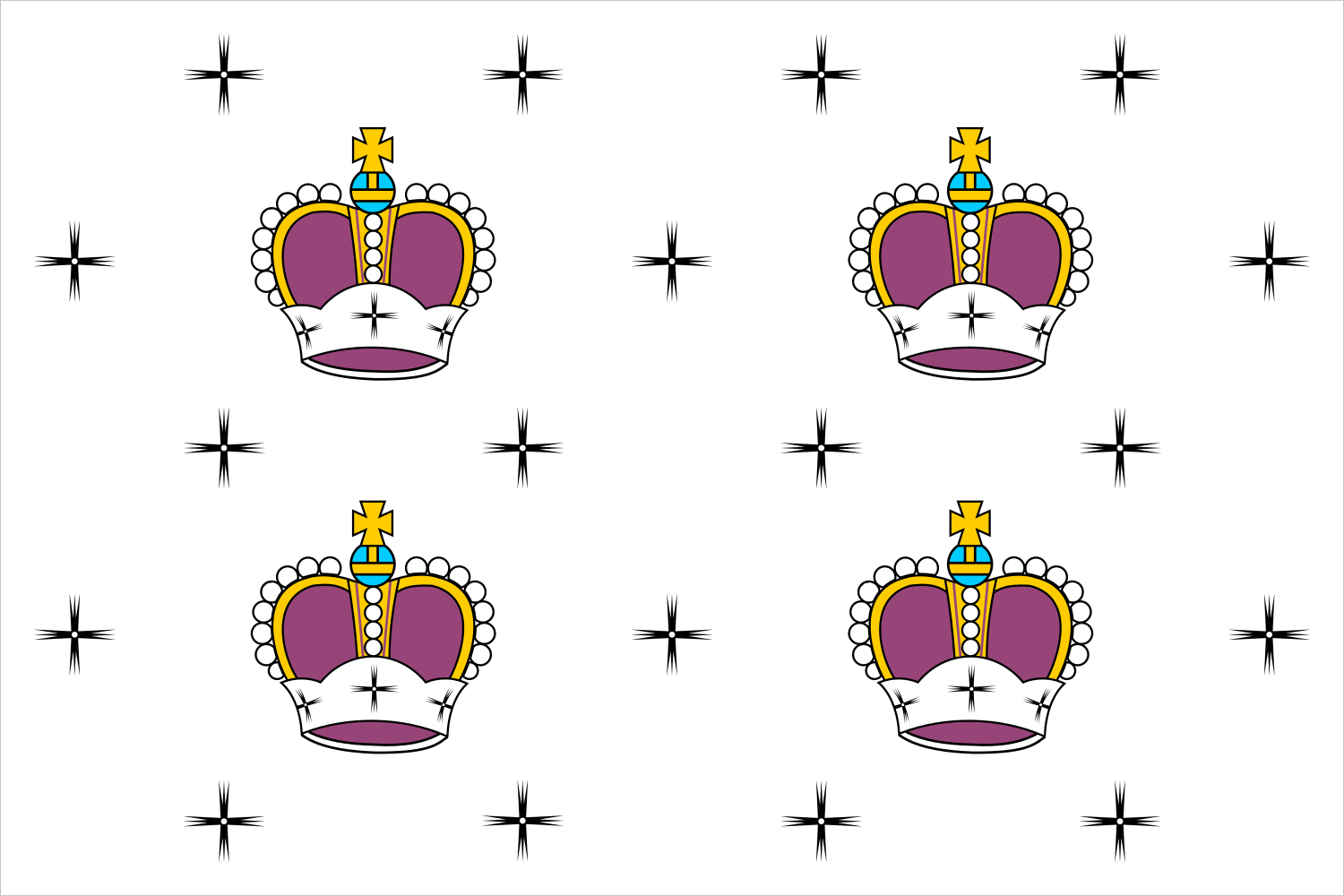
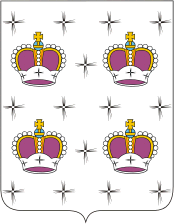
- Flag Coat of arms
- Location of Dmitrovsky District in Moscow Oblast (before July 2012)
- Coordinates: 56°21′N 37°32′E
- Country: Russia
- Federal subject: Moscow Oblast
- Established: 12 July 1929
- Administrative center: Dmitrov

Area
  - Total: 2,182.02 km^{2} (842.48 sq mi)

Population (2010 Census)
  - Total: 151,448
  - Density: 69.4072/km^{2} (179.764/sq mi)
  - Urban: 62.6%
  - Rural: 37.4%

Administrative structure
  - Administrative divisions: 2 Towns, 3 Work settlements, 6 Rural settlements
  - Inhabited localities: 2 cities/towns, 3 urban-type settlements, 396 rural localities

Municipal structure
  - Municipally incorporated as: Dmitrovsky Municipal District
  - Municipal divisions: 5 urban settlements, 6 rural settlements
- Time zone: UTC+3 (MSK)
- OKTMO ID: 46715000
- Website: http://www.dmitrov-reg.ru/

Dmitrovsky District (Russian: Дми́тровский райо́н) is an administrative and municipal district (raion), one of the thirty-six in Moscow Oblast, Russia. It is located in the north of the oblast and borders with Tver Oblast in the northwest, Klinsky District in the west, Solnechnogorsky District in the southwest, Taldomsky District in the north, Sergiyevo-Posadsky District in the east, Pushkinsky District in the southeast, and with Mytishchinsky District in the south. The area of the district is 2,182.02 square kilometers (842.48 sq mi). Its administrative center is the town of Dmitrov. Population: 151,448 (2010 census); 149,793 (2002 Census); 92,080 (1989 Soviet census). The population of Dmitrov accounts for 40.5% of the district's total population.

== Geography ==
The district stretches for 70 kilometers (43 mi) from north to south and for approximately 40 kilometers (25 mi) from east to west. The district is hilly in the south, while the northern portion is mostly flat. The highest point is 273 meters (896 ft) above sea level and the lowest point is 113 meters (371 ft).

The major river flowing through the district include the Sestra, the Volgusha, the Dubna river and the Yakot. Moscow Canal which connects the Moskva River with the Volga River runs through the district.

== History ==
=== 2013 psychiatric hospital fire ===
On the morning of April 26, 2013, a fire swept through Psychiatric Hospital #14 in the settlement of Ramensky, killing thirty-eight people.

== See also ==
- Perimilovsky Heights
