= Aeroport Sheremetyevo railway station =

Railway station in Moscow, Russia

Aeroport Sheremetyevo Аэропорт Шереметьево
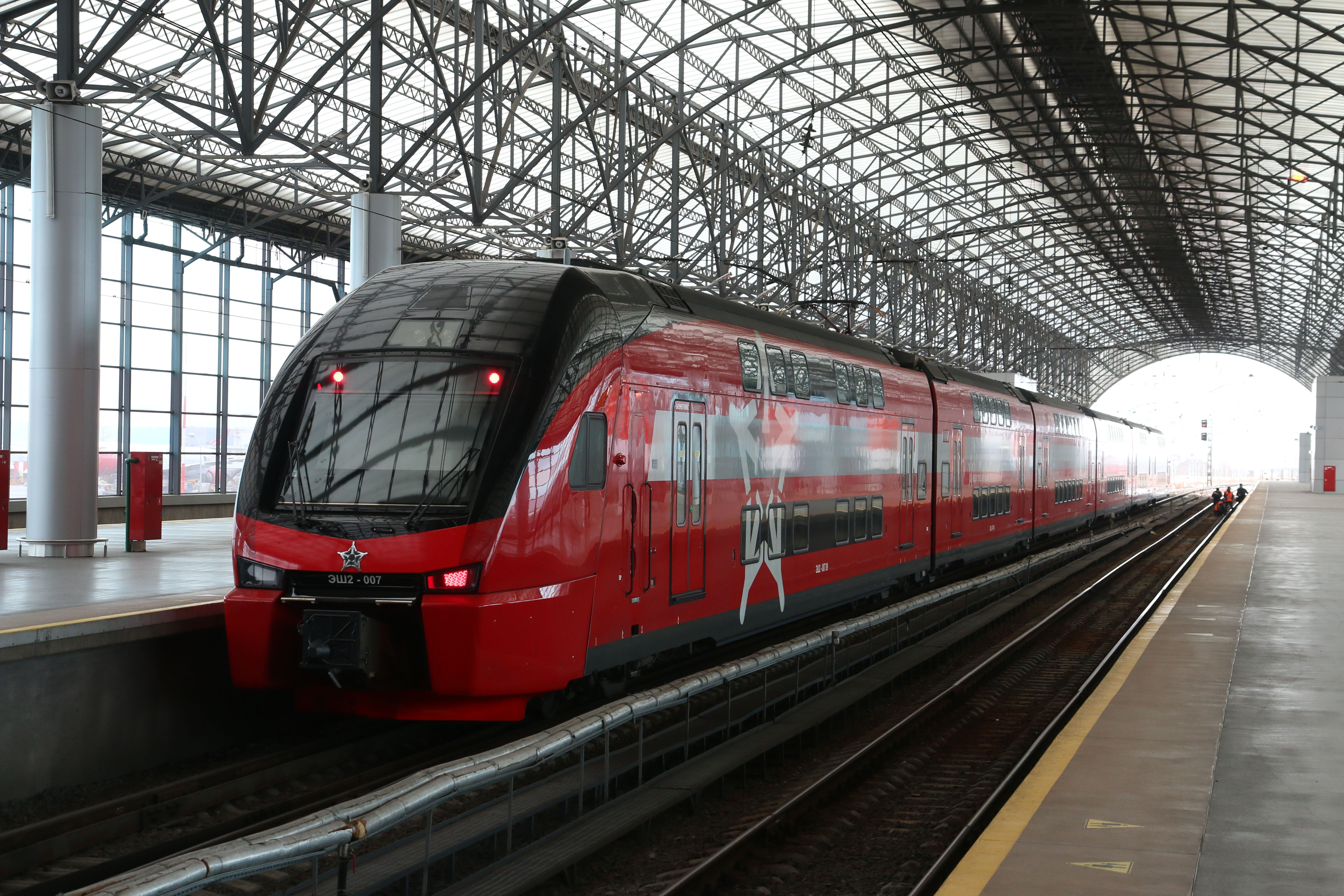

General information
- Location: Moscow; Russia
- Coordinates: 55.9641°N 37.4180°E
- System: Moscow Railway station
- Owner: Russian Railways
- Operator: Moscow Railway

History
- Opened: 10 June 2008

Services
Preceding station	Aeroexpress	Following station
Okruzhnaya towards Odintsovo	Odintsovo to Sheremetyevo Airport	Terminus
Location

Aeroport Sheremetyevo is a railway station in Sheremetyevo Airport which is served by Aeroexpress. It was opened on 10 June 2008.

== Gallery ==
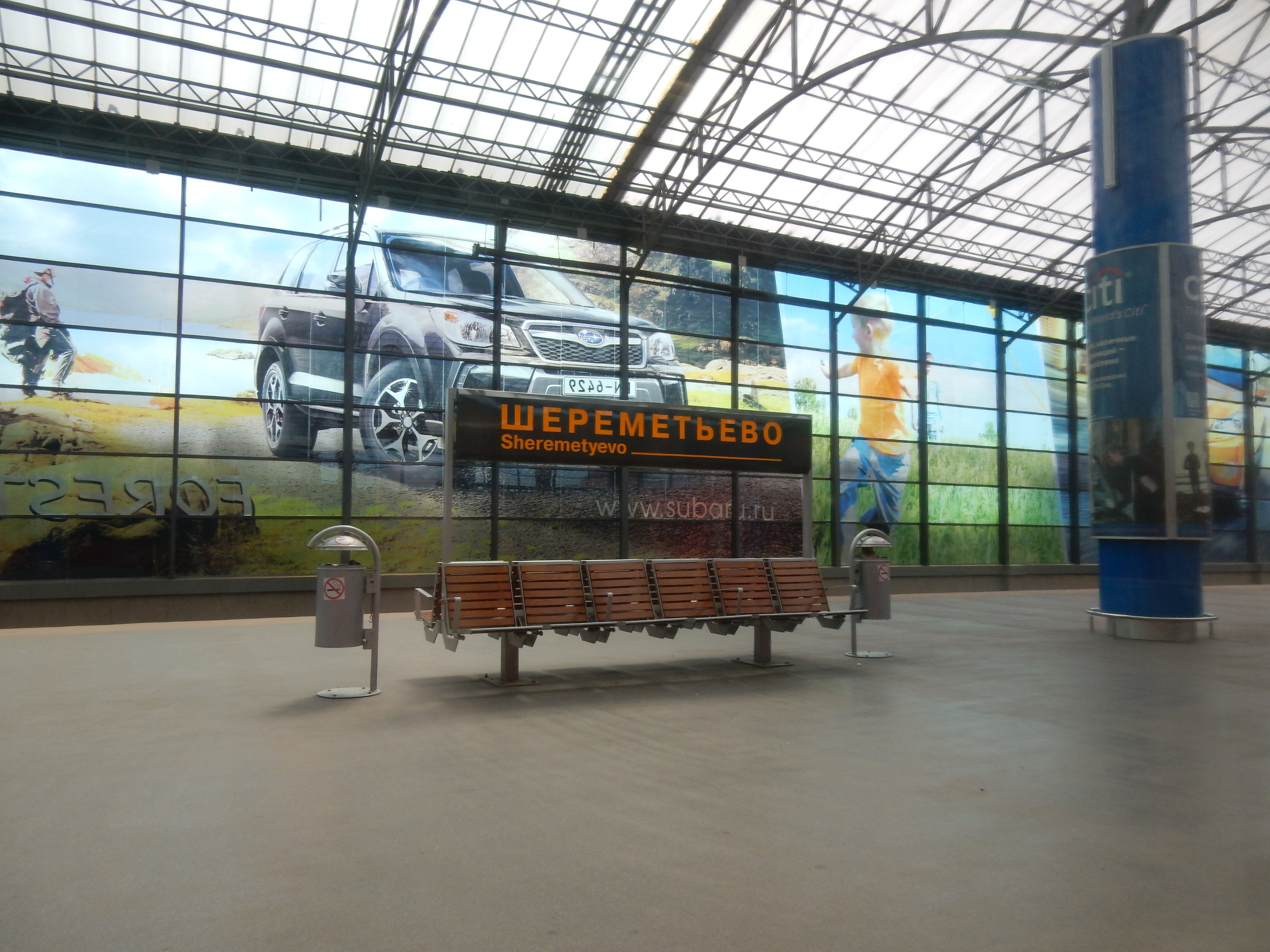

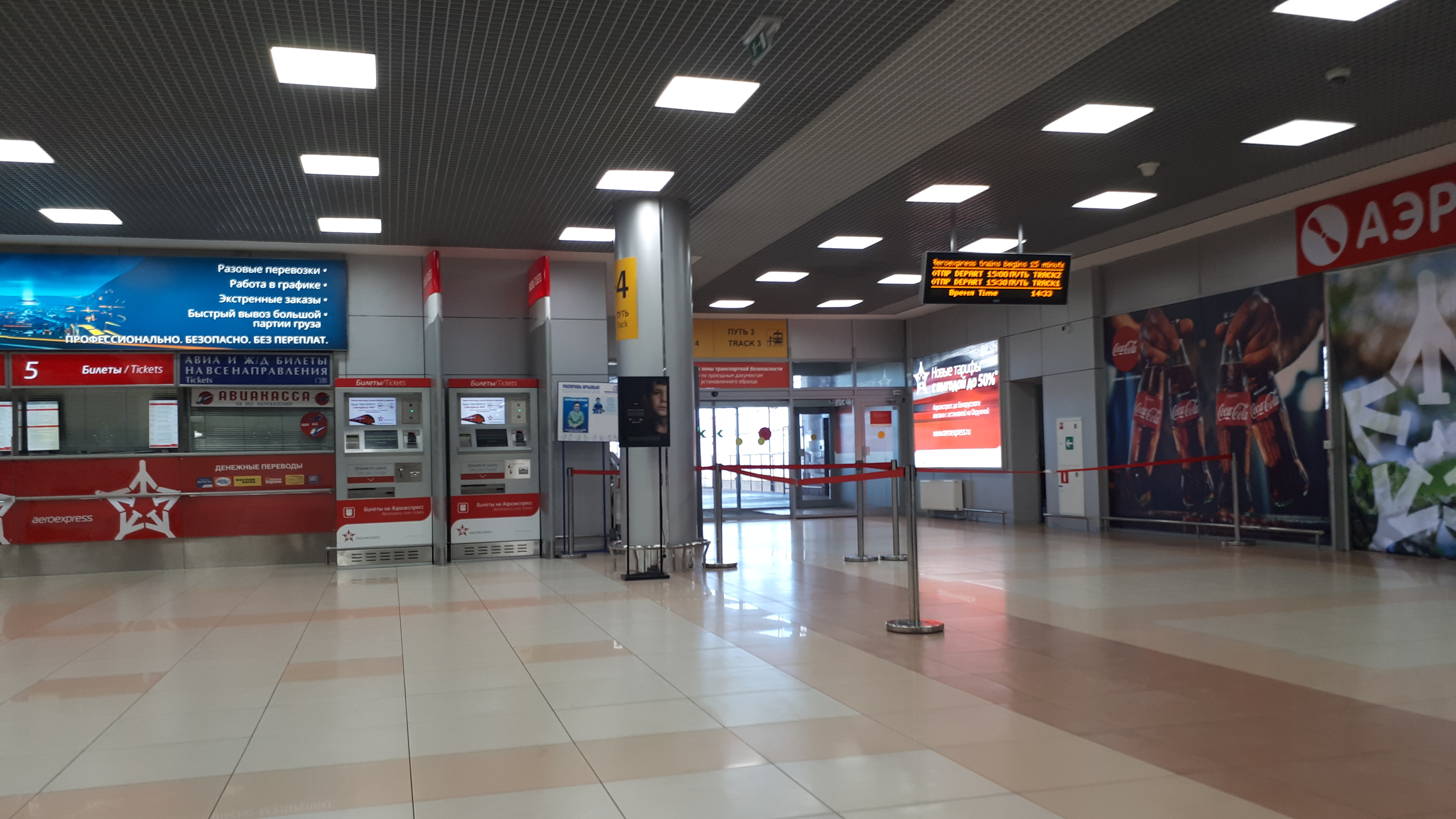
