= Savyolovskaya (Serpukhovsko-Timiryazevskaya line) =

Moscow Metro station

Savyolovskaya Савёловская
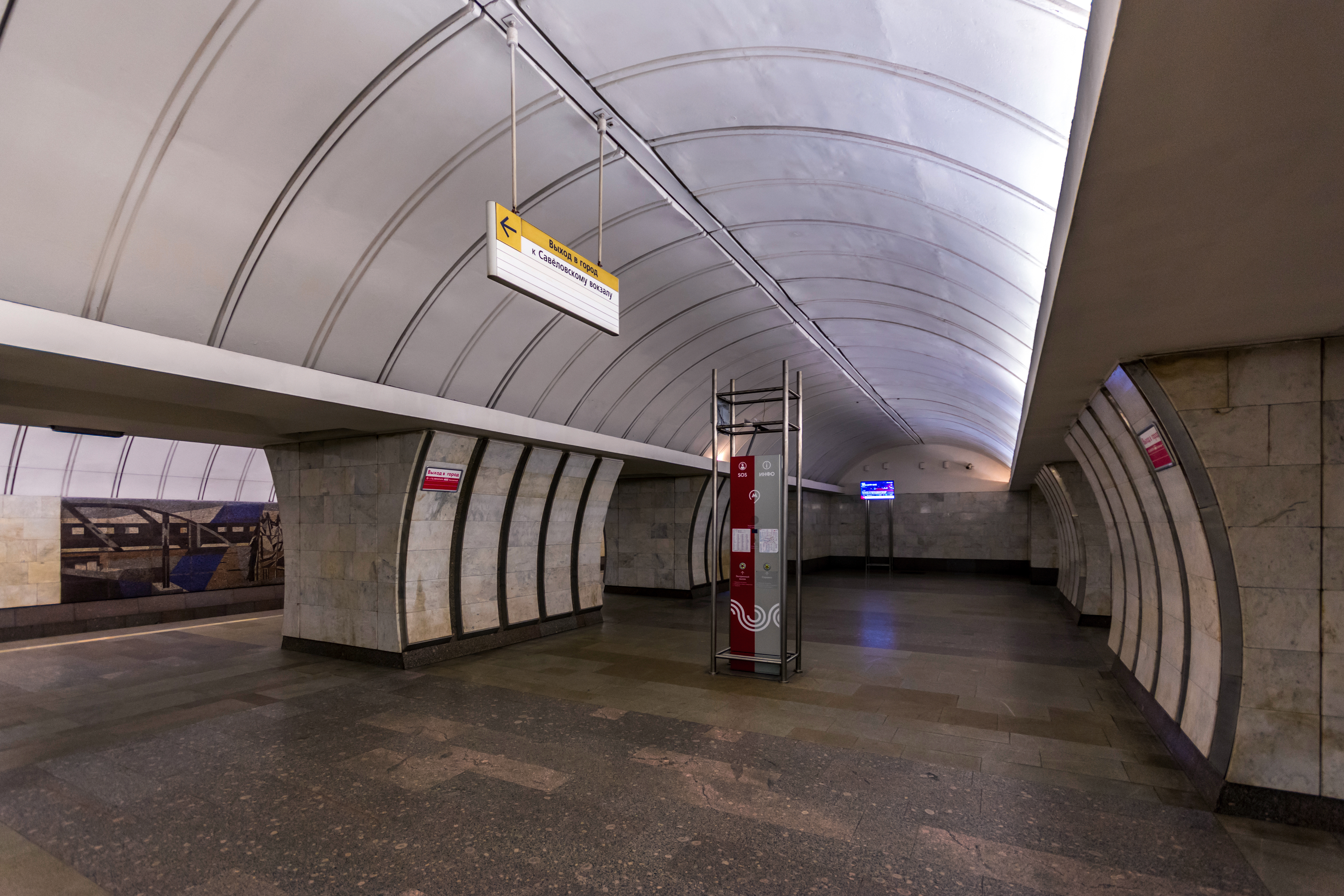

General information
- Location: Butyrsky District; Maryina roshcha District; North-Eastern Administrative Okrug; Moscow; Russia
- Coordinates: 55.7927°N 37.5885°E
- System: Moscow Metro station
- Owner: Moskovsky Metropoliten
- Line: Serpukhovsko-Timiryazevskaya line
- Platforms: 1 island platform
- Tracks: 2

Construction
- Structure type: pylon tri-vault
- Depth: 52 metres (171 ft)
- Platform levels: 1
- Parking: No

Other information
- Station code: 136

History
- Opened: 31 December 1988; 37 years ago

Services
Preceding station	Moscow Metro	Following station
Dmitrovskaya towards Altufyevo	Serpukhovsko-Timiryazevskaya line	Mendeleyevskaya towards Bulvar Dmitriya Donskogo
Petrovsky Park anticlockwise / outer	Bolshaya Koltsevaya line transfer at Savyolovskaya	Maryina Roshcha clockwise / inner
Route map
Location
- Location within Moscow Metro

Savyolovskaya (Russian: Савёловская), alternatively transliterated Savelovskaya, is a station on Serpukhovsko-Timiryazevskaya Line of the Moscow Metro. It is in the Butyrsky District of Moscow and has a depth of 52 metres (171 ft). It opened on 31 December 1988 and was the northern terminus of the line until an extension in 1991 pushed the terminus out to Otradnoye.

The entrance vestibule is on the main square in front of Savyolovsky rail terminal, from which the station gets its name. Connections at the rail terminal provide access to commuter trains serving destinations to the north of Moscow.

Passengers are able to transfer to and from an identically named station on the Bolshaya Koltsevaya line since 30 December 2018.
