= Savyolovskaya (Bolshaya Koltsevaya line) =

Moscow Metro station

Savyolovskaya Савёловская
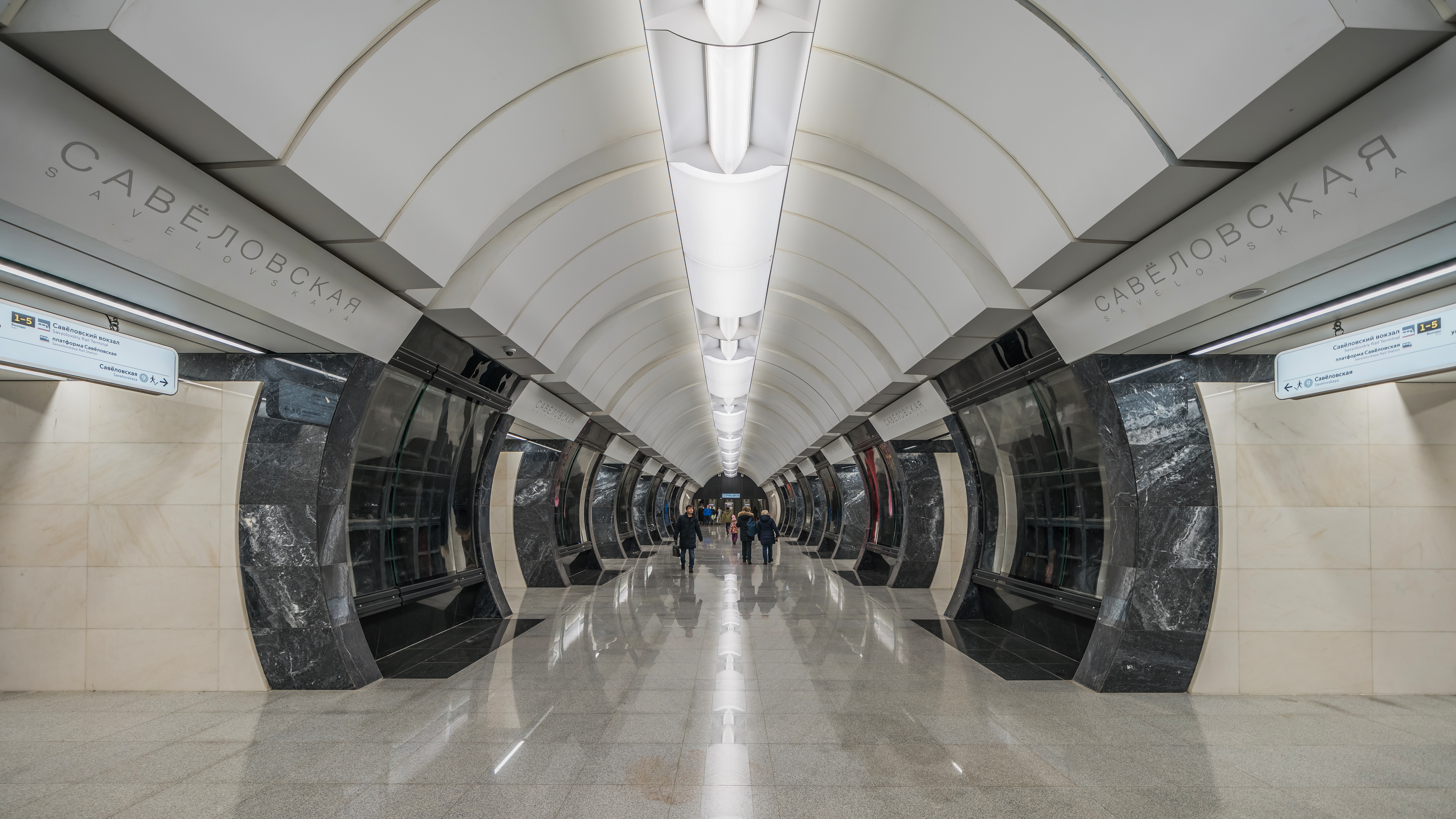
- Savyolovskaya metro station

General information
- Location: Savyolovsky District, Northern Administrative Okrug; Butyrsky District, North-Eastern Administrative Okrug; Moscow; Russia
- Coordinates: 55.7934°N 37.5870°E
- System: Moscow Metro station
- Owner: Moskovsky Metropoliten
- Line: Bolshaya Koltsevaya line
- Platforms: 1 island platform
- Tracks: 2

Construction
- Structure type: Pylon station
- Depth: 65 metres (213 ft)
- Platform levels: 1

History
- Opened: 30 December 2018

Services
Preceding station	Moscow Metro	Following station
Petrovsky Park anticlockwise / outer	Bolshaya Koltsevaya line	Maryina Roshcha clockwise / inner
Dmitrovskaya towards Altufyevo	Serpukhovsko-Timiryazevskaya line transfer at Savyolovskaya	Mendeleyevskaya towards Bulvar Dmitriya Donskogo
Route map
Bolshaya Koltsevaya line
Location
- Location within Moscow Metro

The central part of the station Savelovskaya

Savyolovskaya (Russian: Савёловская) is a station on the Bolshaya Koltsevaya line of the Moscow Metro. It opened on 30 December 2018. Until December 2020, this station also served as the terminus of Solntsevskaya line.

During planning and construction, this station was named "Nizhnyaya Maslovka" (Russian: Нижняя Масловка) for the street on which it is located. Before opening, the metro changed the name to be consistent with the other connected stations.

== History ==
Construction on the station began in 2012. At first, the city intended to use typical underground tunneling methods for the station, which is 65 meters (213 feet) underground. Project engineers suggested a new technology that would involve a single-vaulted design that is more commonly used for shallow stations constructed using cut-and-cover methods. This could reduce the construction time from 36 to 24 months. The city originally expected the station to be ready by 2016. This later was pushed to 2017 and, eventually, the beginning of 2019. Because of the time and difficulty of building such deep stations, the Head of Construction for Moscow Marat Khusnullin said that this would be the last deep station built in Moscow.

== Location ==
It is in the near Nizhnyaya Maslovka and Butyrsky Val streets in the Maryina roshcha District of Moscow near the Moscow Savyolovsky railway station. There is a free interchange to Savyolovskaya station on the Serpukhovsko-Timiryazevskaya line, which provides access to central Moscow. It also serves the nearby Savyolovsky railway station. Passengers are able to access the station through two underground lobbies.

== Design ==
The walls of the station are not covered in panels or concrete; rather, they are covered in glass such that passengers can see the structure of the tunnels.

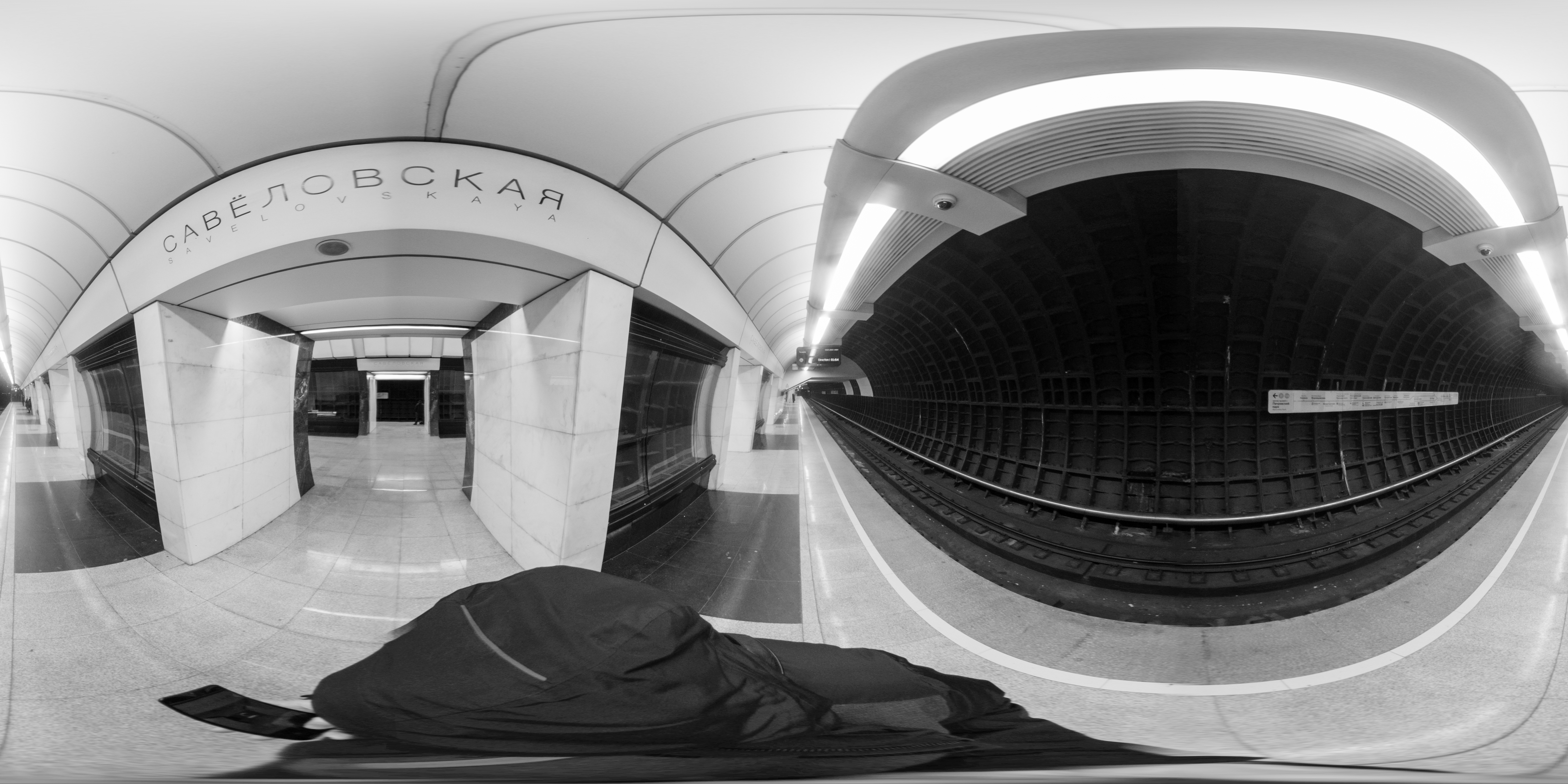
Interior of track hall (view as a 360° interactive panorama)

Otherwise, the platforms and vestibules have marble and granite floors and walls.

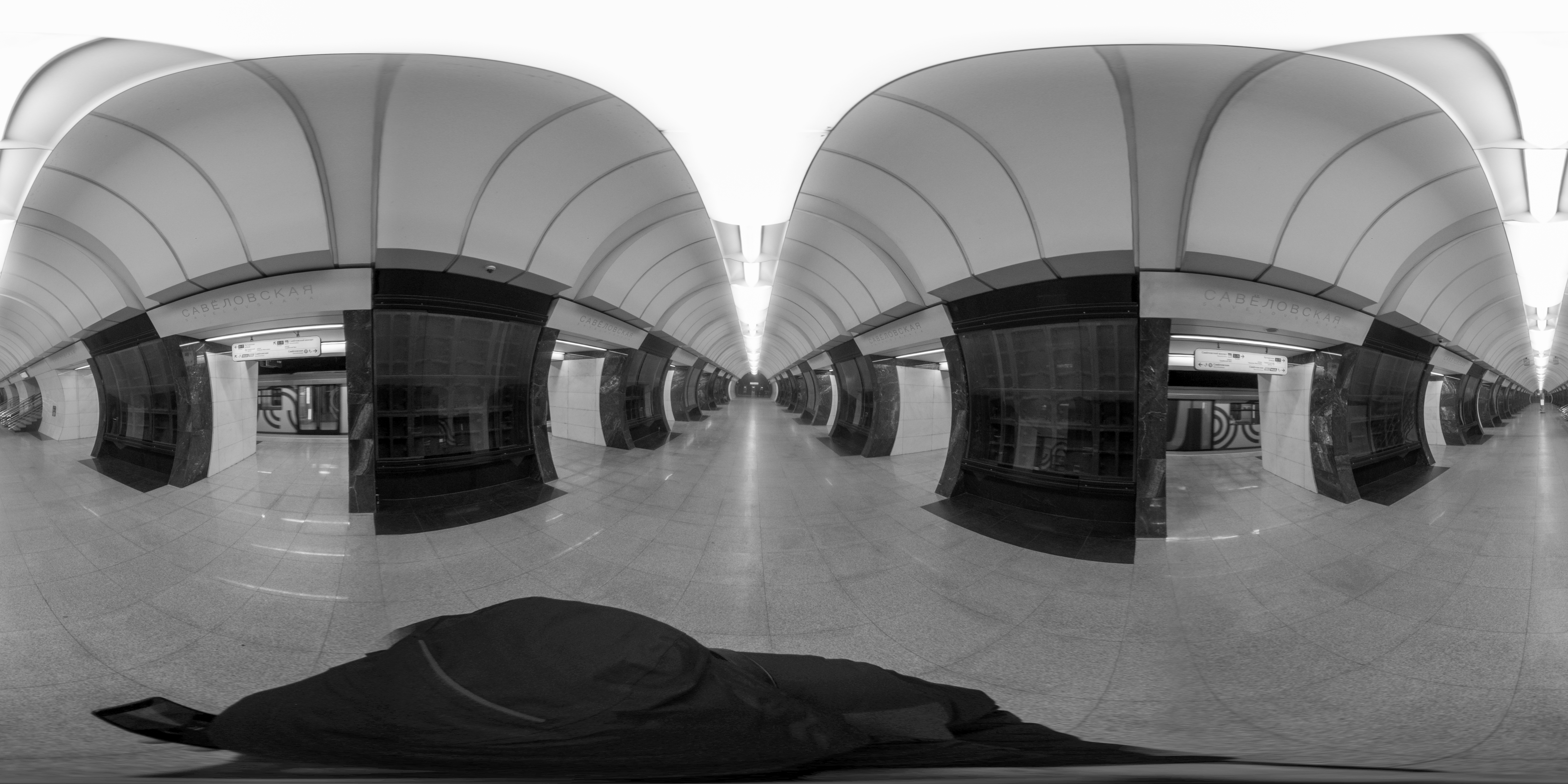
Interior of main hall (view as a 360° interactive panorama)
