= Dmitrov =

Town in Moscow Oblast, Russia

Dmitrov Дмитров
- Town
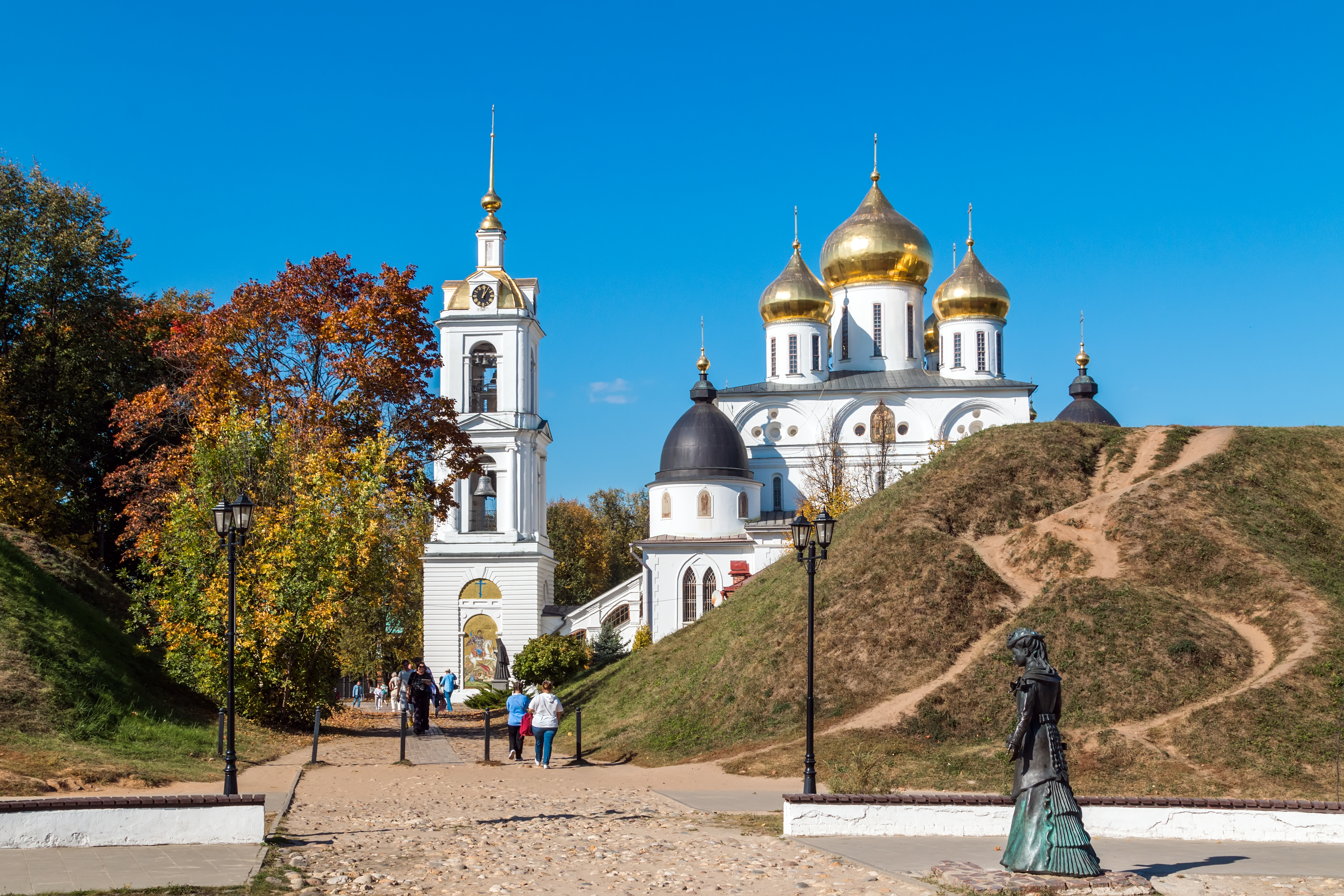

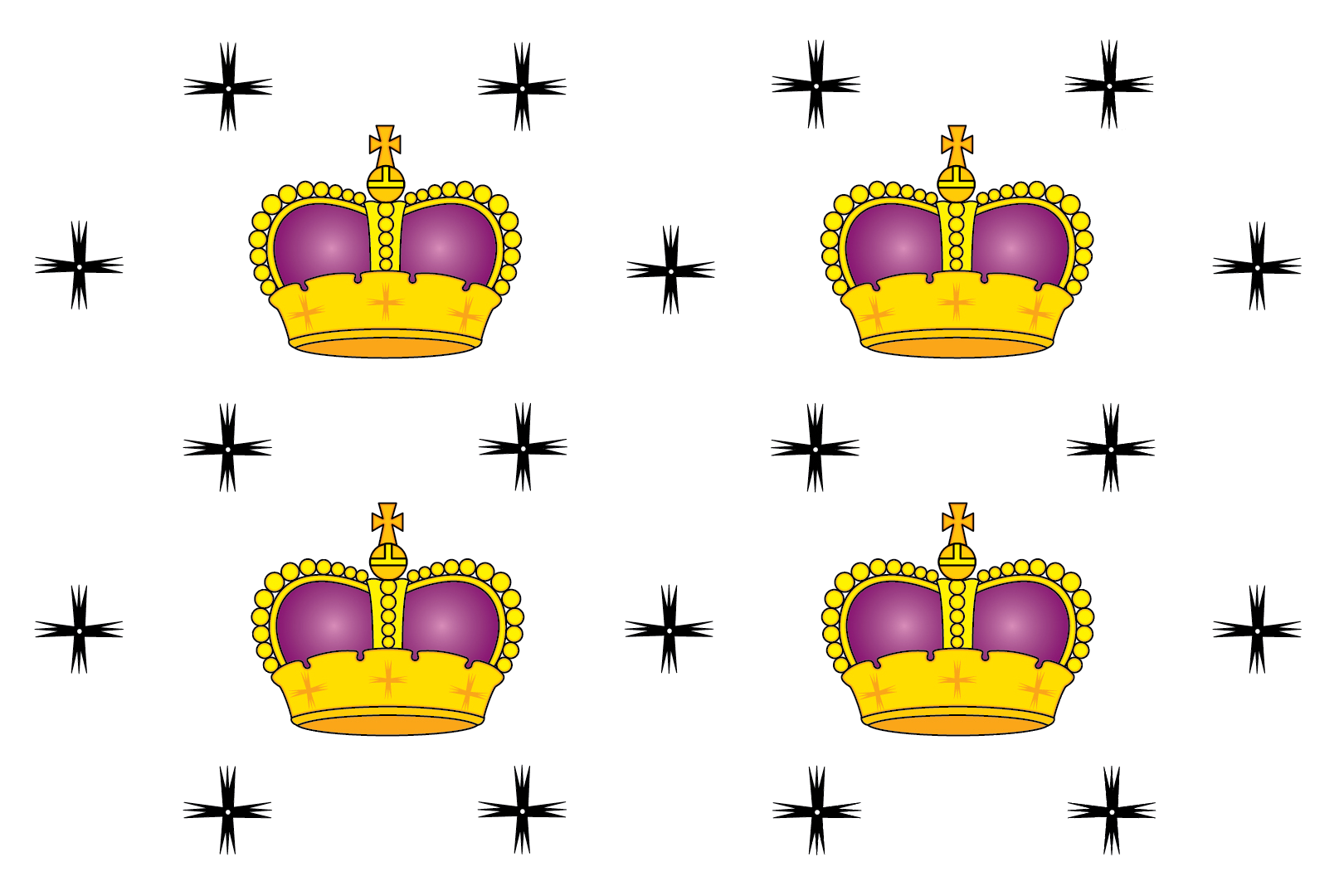
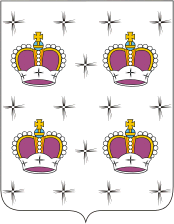
- Flag Coat of arms
- Interactive map of Dmitrov
- Location of Dmitrov Dmitrov (Moscow Oblast)
- Coordinates: 56°21′N 37°32′E
- Country: Russia
- Federal subject: Moscow Oblast
- Administrative district: Dmitrovsky District
- TownSelsoviet: Dmitrov
- Founded: 1154
- Town status since: 1374
- Elevation: 160 m (520 ft)

Population (2010 Census)
  - Total: 61,305
  - Estimate (2024): 63,044 (+2.8%)
  - Rank: 265th in 2010

Administrative status
  - Capital of: Dmitrovsky District, Town of Dmitrov

Municipal status
  - Municipal district: Dmitrovsky Municipal District
  - Urban settlement: Dmitrov Urban Settlement
  - Capital of: Dmitrovsky Municipal District, Dmitrov Urban Settlement
- Time zone: UTC+3 (MSK)
- Postal codes: 141800–141803, 141815, 141816, 141899
- Dialing code: +7 49622
- OKTMO ID: 46515000001
- Website: dmitrov-reg.ru

Dmitrov (Russian: Дми́тров, romanized: ˈdmʲitrəf, lit. 'Dmitri's') is a town and the administrative center of Dmitrovsky District in Moscow Oblast, Russia, located 65 kilometers (40 mi) to the north of Moscow on the Yakhroma River and the Moscow Canal. Population: 65,574 (2021 census); 61,305 (2010 census); 62,219 (2002 census); 65,237 (1989 Soviet census).

== History ==
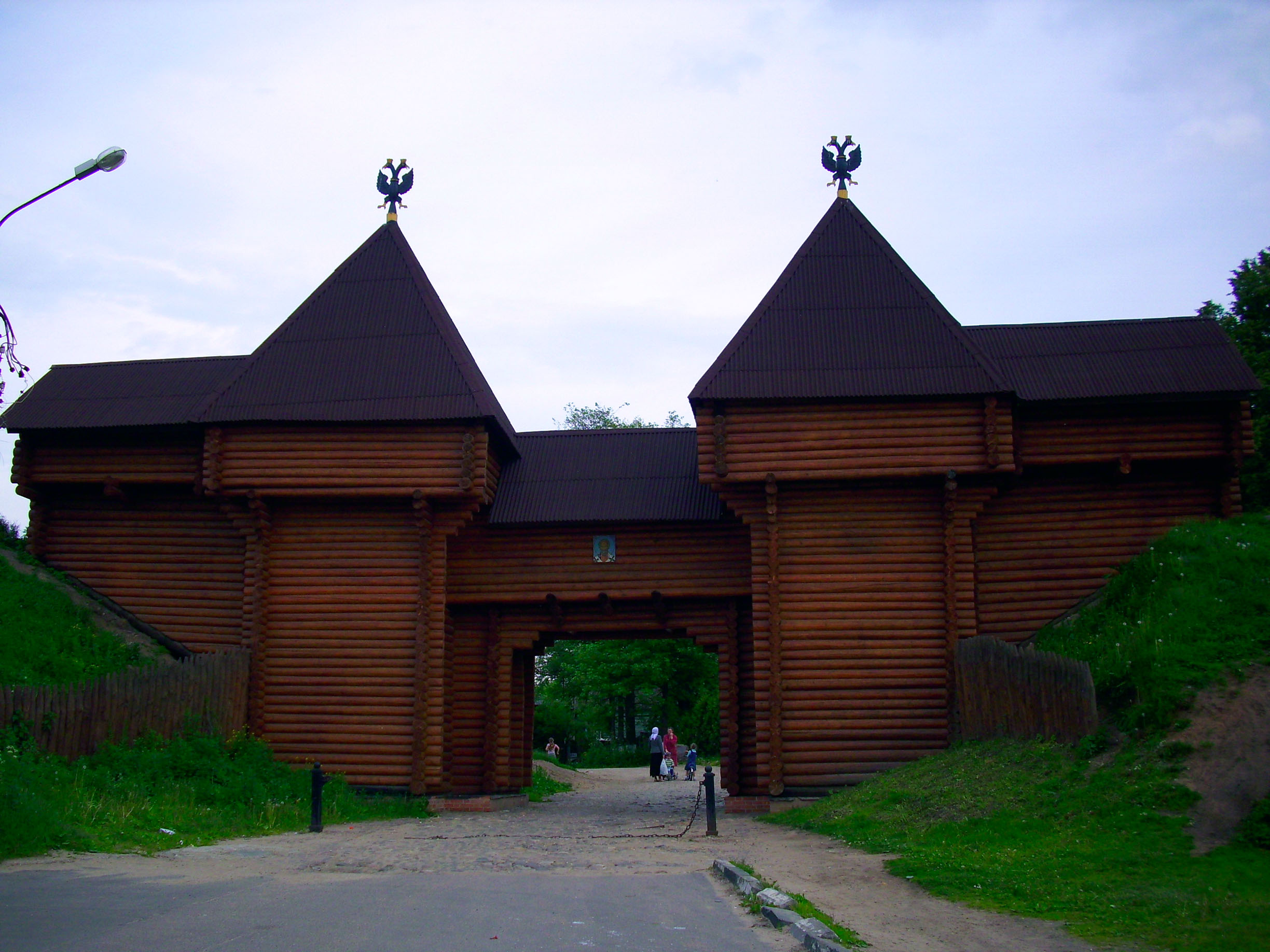
Nikolskye gates in Dmitrov kremlin

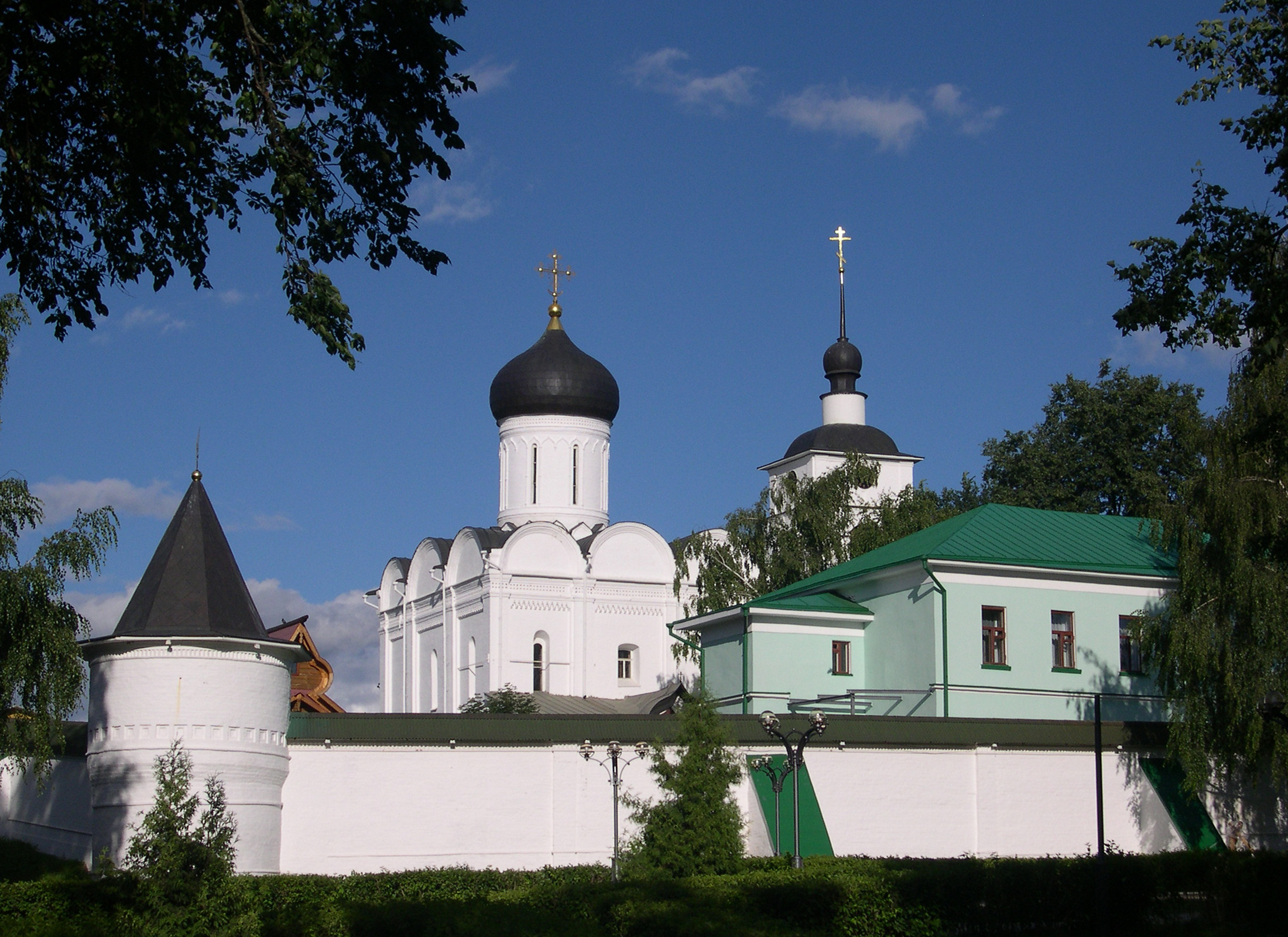
The Cathedral of Sts. Boris and Gleb

Dmitrov is one of the oldest urban areas in Moscow Oblast. The town was originally founded by Yury Dolgoruky in 1154, where his son Vsevolod was born. Its name is explained by the fact that Vsevolod's patron saint was St. Demetrius.

In the 13th century, the settlement marked a point where the borders of the Grand Duchy of Moscow, Tver, and Pereslavl-Zalessky converged. The settlement itself belonged to the princes of Galich-Mersky, located much to the north, until 1364, when it was incorporated into the Grand Duchy of Moscow. Both Dmitry Donskoy and his grandson Vasily II granted Dmitrov as an appanage to their younger sons, so Dmitrov was the capital of a tiny principality. In 1374, it was given town rights.

The reign of Ivan III's son Yury Ivanovich (1503–1533) inaugurated the golden age of Dmitrov. It is during his reign that the black-domed Assumption Cathedral in the kremlin and a smaller monastery cathedral of Sts. Boris and Gleb were built. Thereafter, the town passed to Yury's brother, Andrey of Staritsa. In 1569, it was seized from Vladimir of Staritsa, added to the Oprichnina and consequently went into a decline. The town suffered further damage during the Time of Troubles, when it was ransacked by the Poles.

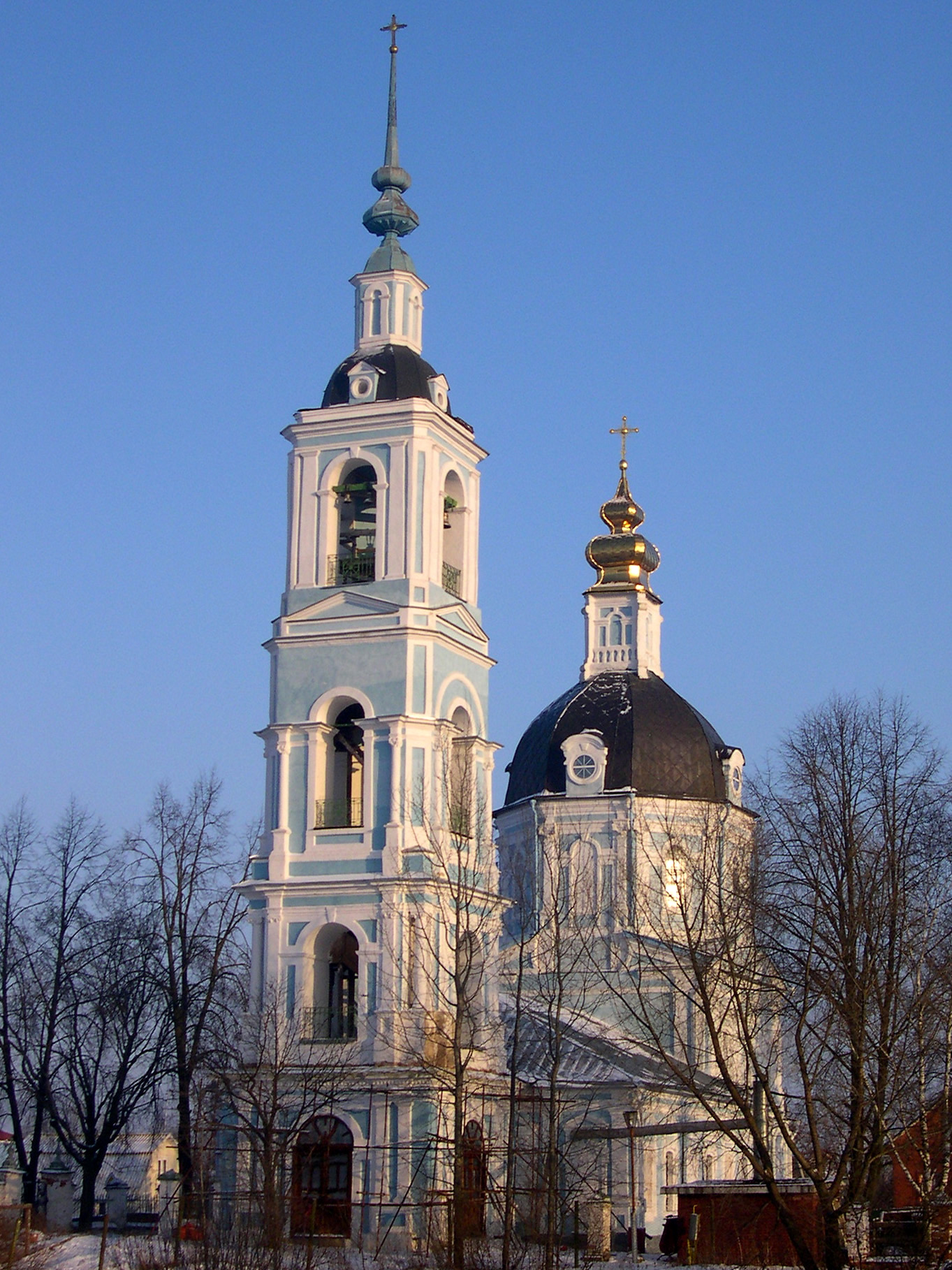
The Vvedenskaya Church dates from the 1760s

In 1812, Dmitrov was briefly occupied by the Grande Armée. The Anarchist prince Peter Kropotkin spent his last years there after the Russian Revolution. In the 1930s, the local kremlin was excavated by Soviet archaeologists. In November 1941, German troops occupied the town and crossed the Moscow-Volga Canal from there.

== Administrative and municipal status ==
Within the framework of administrative divisions, Dmitrov serves as the administrative center of Dmitrovsky District. As an administrative division, it is, together with eighty rural localities, incorporated within Dmitrovsky District as the Town of Dmitrov. As a municipal division, the Town of Dmitrov is incorporated within Dmitrovsky Municipal District as Dmitrov Urban Settlement.

== Transportation ==
Dmitrov is a railway junction of the Moscow (Savyolovsky terminal)–Savyolovo branch and the Dmitrov–Alexandrov branch. The railway provides an efficient service to Moscow. Dmitrov is also a cargo port on the Moscow Canal.

Bus routes connect Dmitrov with Moscow (Altufyevo), Sergiyev Posad, Dubna, Taldom, Lobnya, Laryovo, and other destinations.

== Miscellaneous ==
- Dmitrov's altitude above sea level is 179 meters (587 ft).
- In a national competition in 2005, Dmitrov was recognized as the best-run town in Russia.
- t.A.T.u. shot their video for Nas Ne Dagoniat (Not Gonna Get Us) in Dmitrov

== Twin towns – sister cities ==
Dmitrov is twinned with:

- Bytom, Poland
- Flevoland, Netherlands
- Osimo, Italy
- Piła, Poland
- (Georgia (country)) Pitsunda, Georgia
- Puchavichy District, Belarus
- Rems-Murr (district), Germany
- Rēzekne, Latvia
- Rîbnița District, Moldova
- Yahotyn Raion, Ukraine

== Notable people ==
- Igor Gouzenko (1919-1982), a soviet cipher clerk who defected to Canada with 109 documents about the USSR's espionage activities in the West
