= Setun railway station =

Railway station in Moscow, Russia

Setun Сетунь
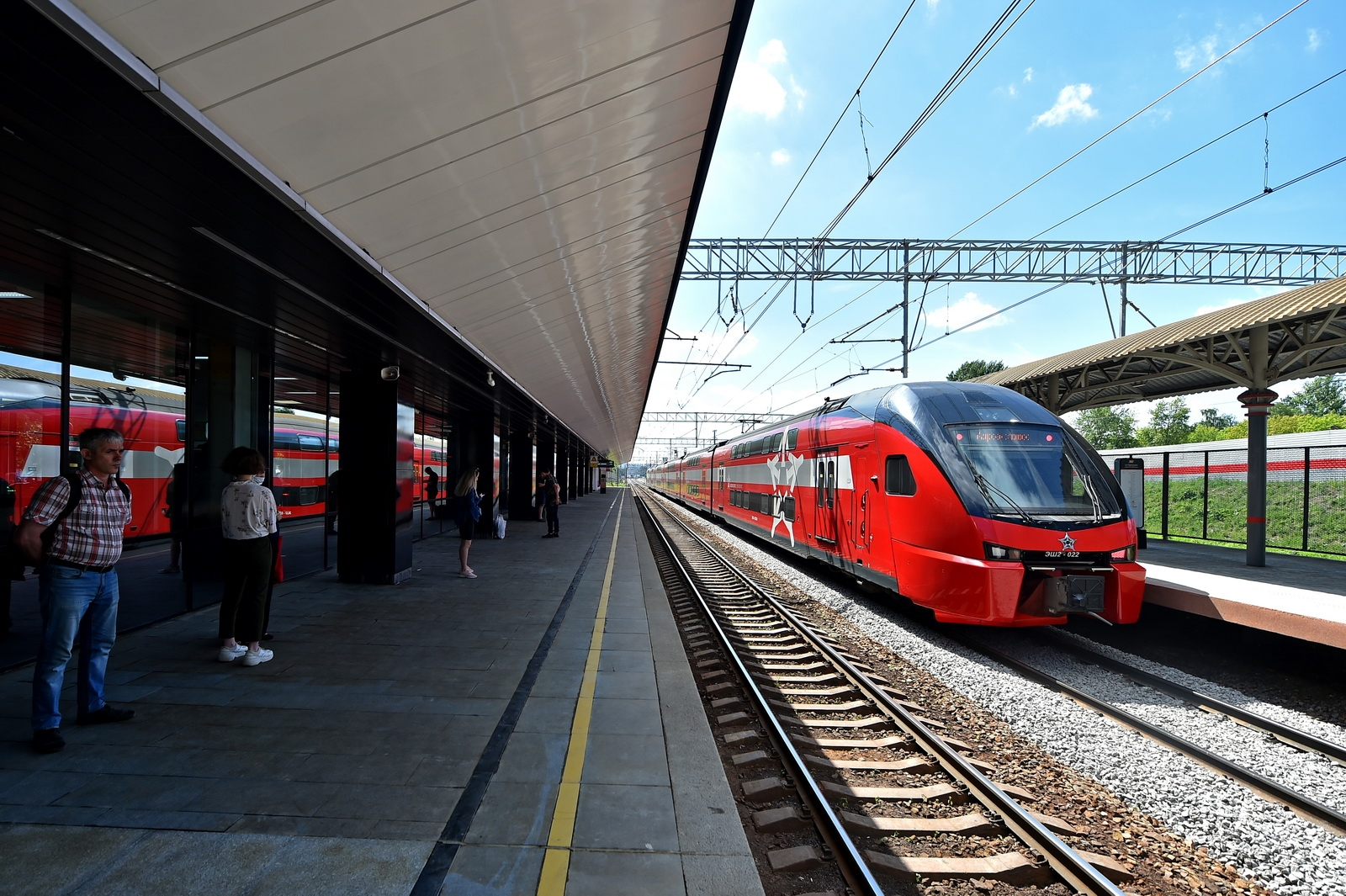

General information
- Location: Moscow; Russia
- Coordinates: 55.7239°N 37.3979°E
- System: Moscow Railway platform
- Owner: Russian Railways
- Operator: Moscow Railway
- Platforms: 2 (Island platform)
- Tracks: 4

Construction
- Structure type: At-grade

History
- Opened: 1932
- Rebuilt: 2020

Services
Preceding station	Moscow Central Diameters	Following station
Nemchinovka towards Odintsovo	Line D1	Rabochy Posyolok towards Lobnya
Preceding station	Russian Railways	Following station
Nemchinovka towards Gagarin	Belorussky Suburban	Rabochy Posyolok towards Moscow Belorussky
Preceding station	Aeroexpress	Following station
Nemchinovka towards Odintsovo	Odintsovo to Sheremetyevo Airport	Rabochy Posyolok towards Aeroport Sheremetyevo
Route map
Location

Setun is a railway station of Line D1 of the Moscow Central Diameters in Moscow. It was opened in 1932 and rebuilt in 2020.

== Gallery ==
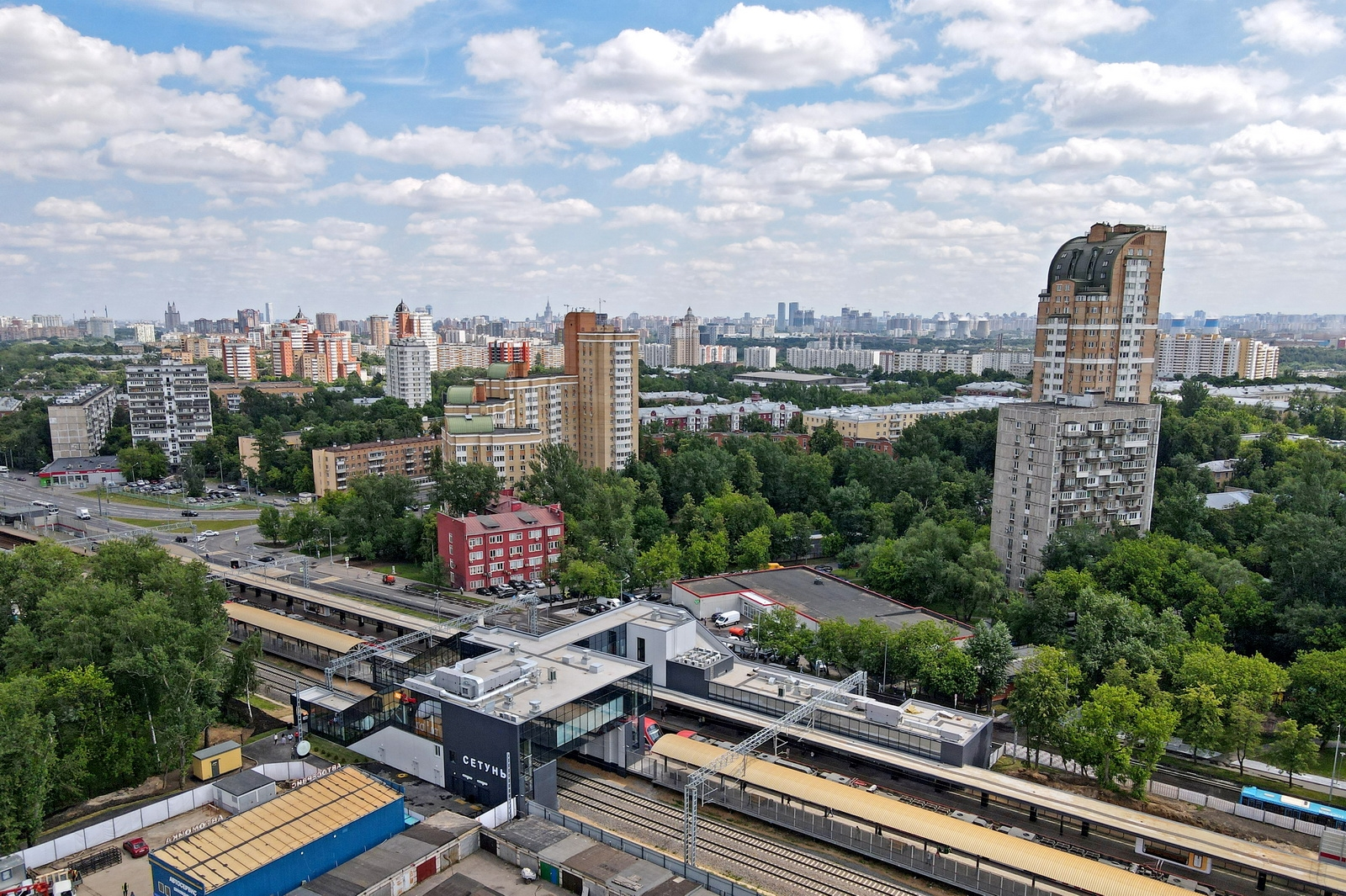
Setun railway station on the opening day in June 2020.

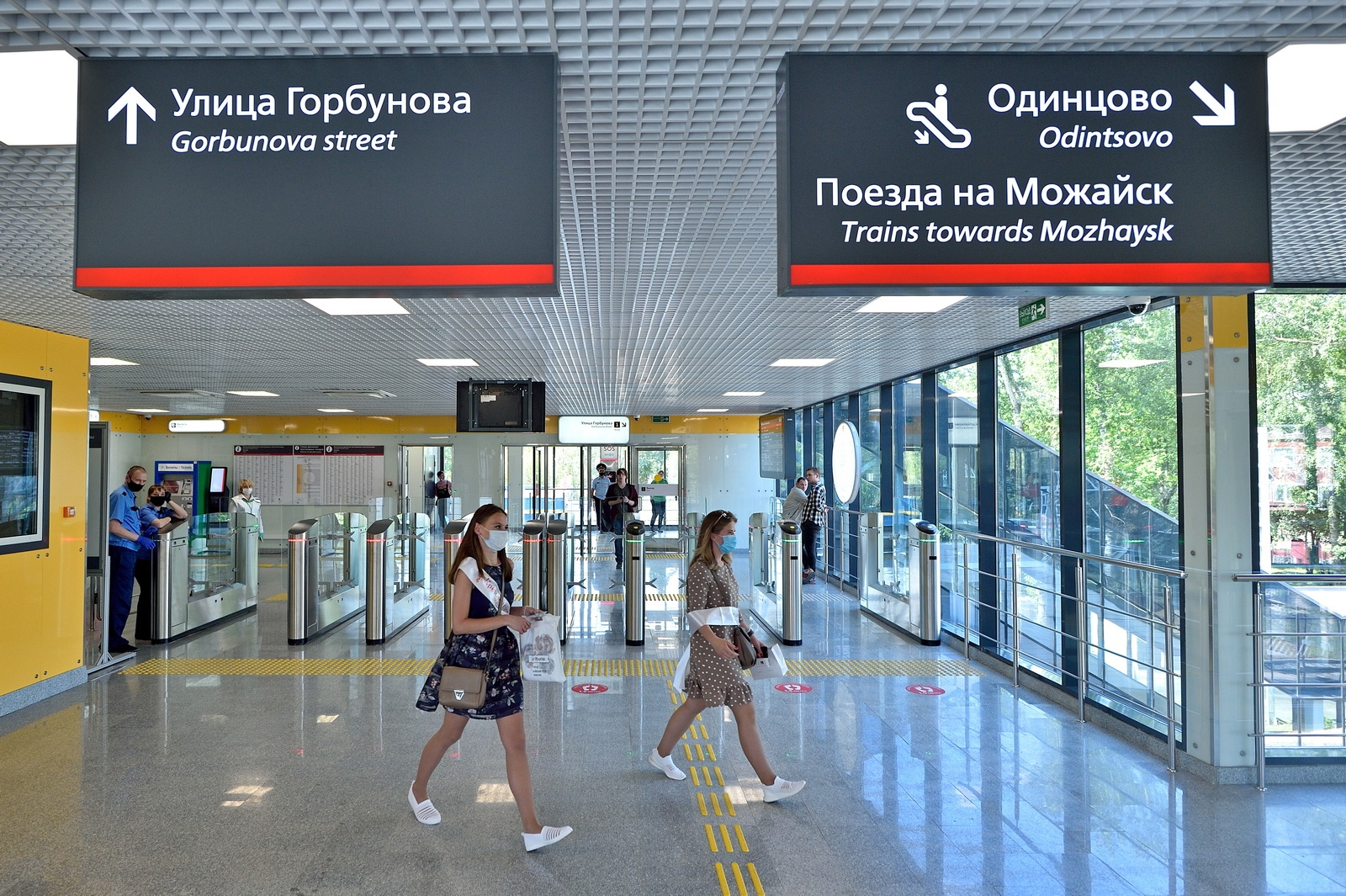

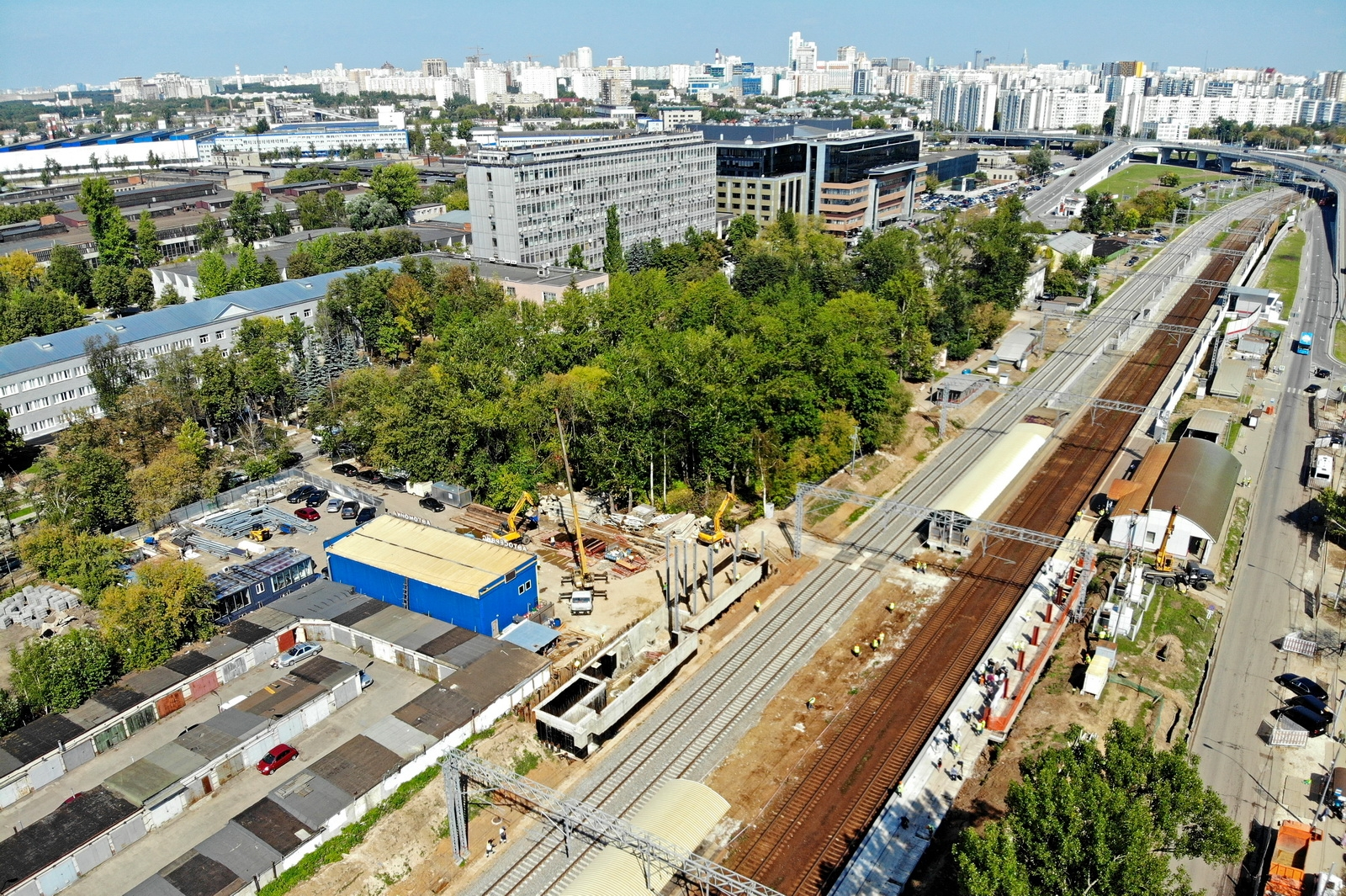
Reconstruction progress as of August 2019.
