= Slavyansky Bulvar railway station =

Railway station in Moscow, Russia

Slavyansky Bulvar Славянский бульвар
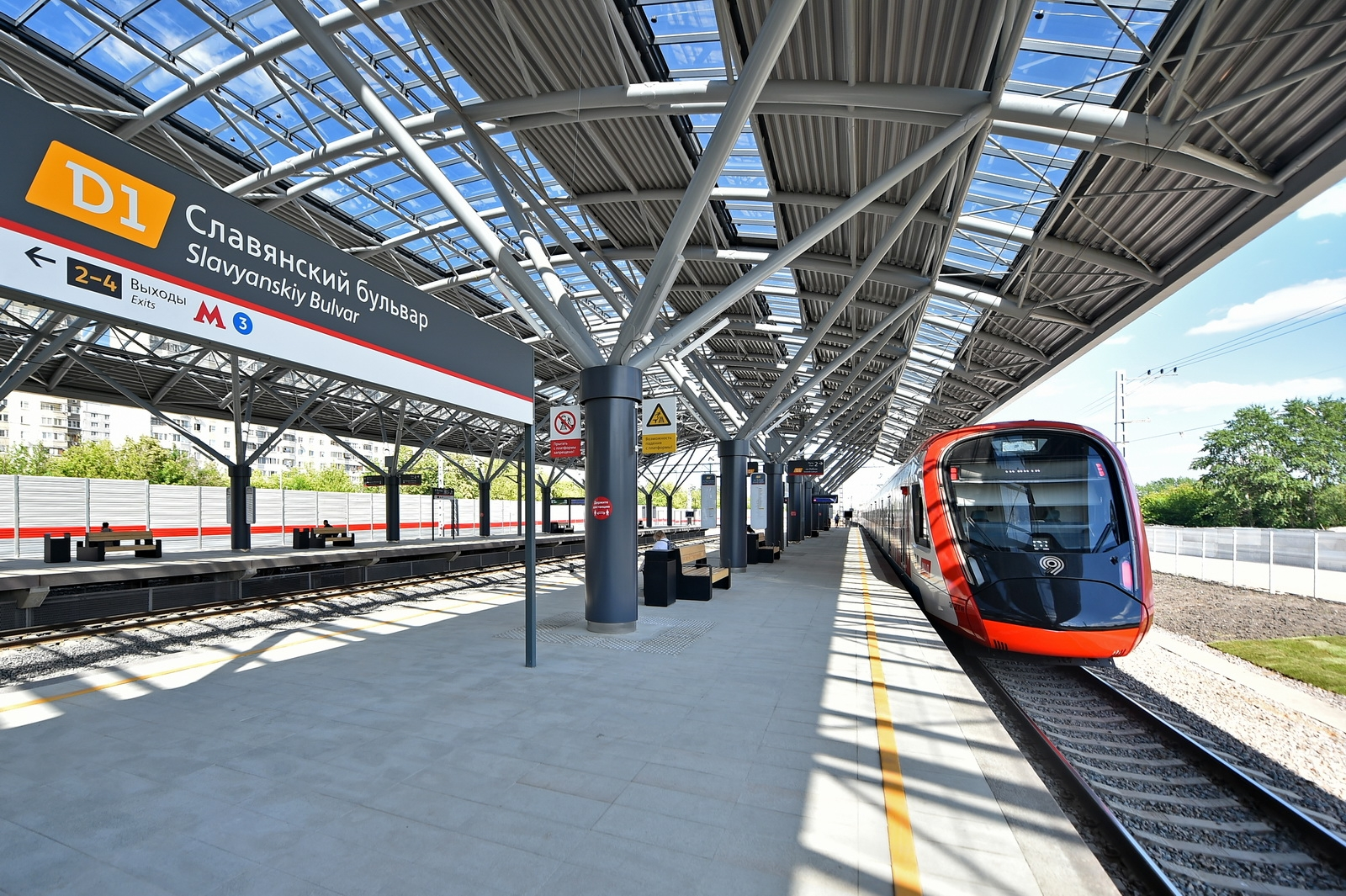

General information
- Location: Moscow; Russia
- Coordinates: 55.7304°N 37.4725°E
- System: Moscow Railway platform
- Owner: Russian Railways
- Operator: Moscow Railway
- Platforms: 2 (Island platform)
- Tracks: 4

History
- Opened: 2020

Services
Preceding station	Moscow Central Diameters	Following station
Kuntsevskaya towards Odintsovo	Line D1	Fili towards Lobnya
Preceding station	Russian Railways	Following station
Kuntsevskaya towards Gagarin	Belorussky Suburban	Fili towards Moscow Belorussky
Preceding station	Aeroexpress	Following station
Kuntsevskaya towards Odintsovo	Odintsovo to Sheremetyevo Airport	Fili towards Aeroport Sheremetyevo
Route map
Location

Slavyansky Bulvar is a railway station of Line D1 of the Moscow Central Diameters in Moscow. It was opened in 2020.

== Gallery ==
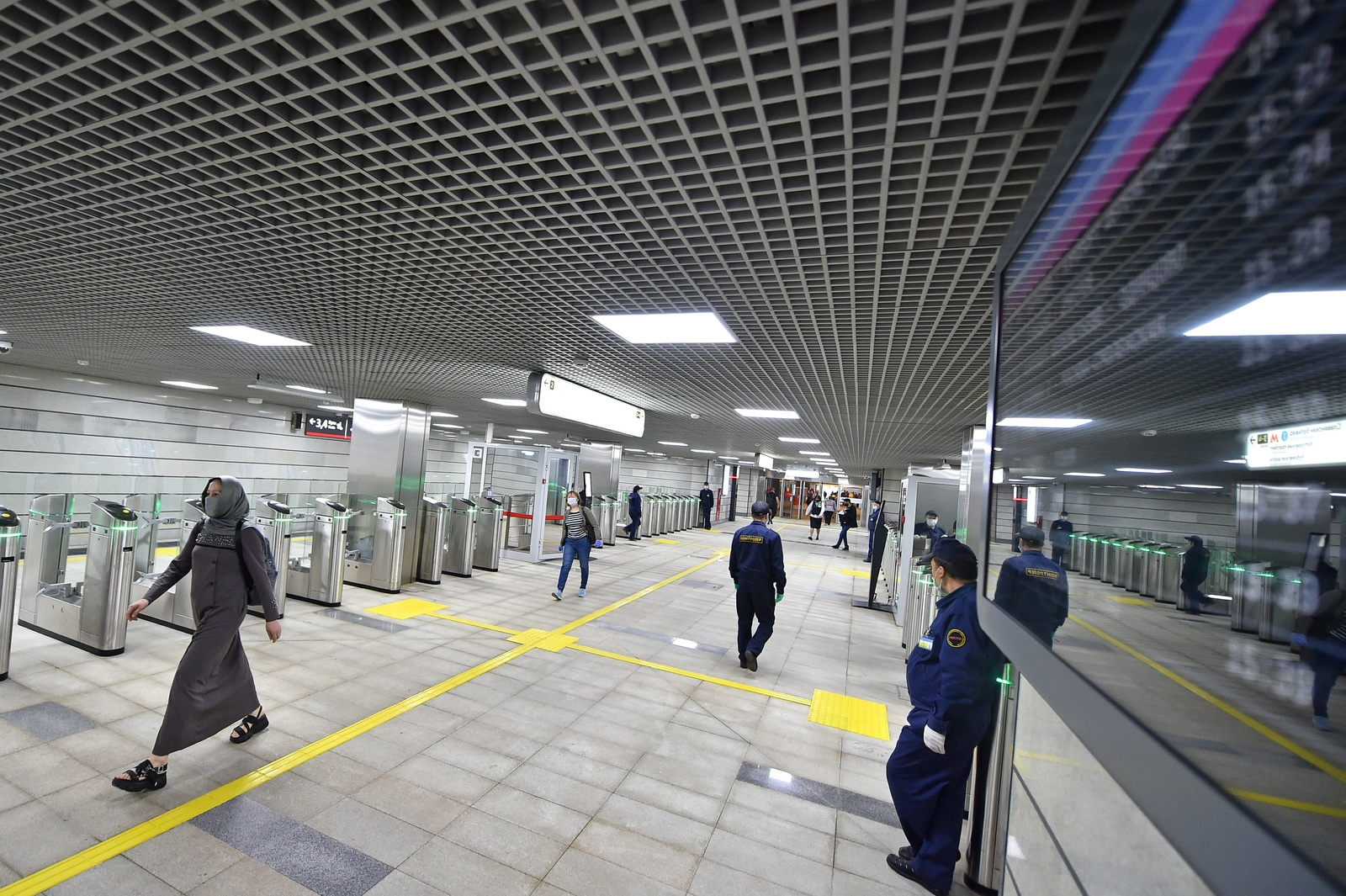

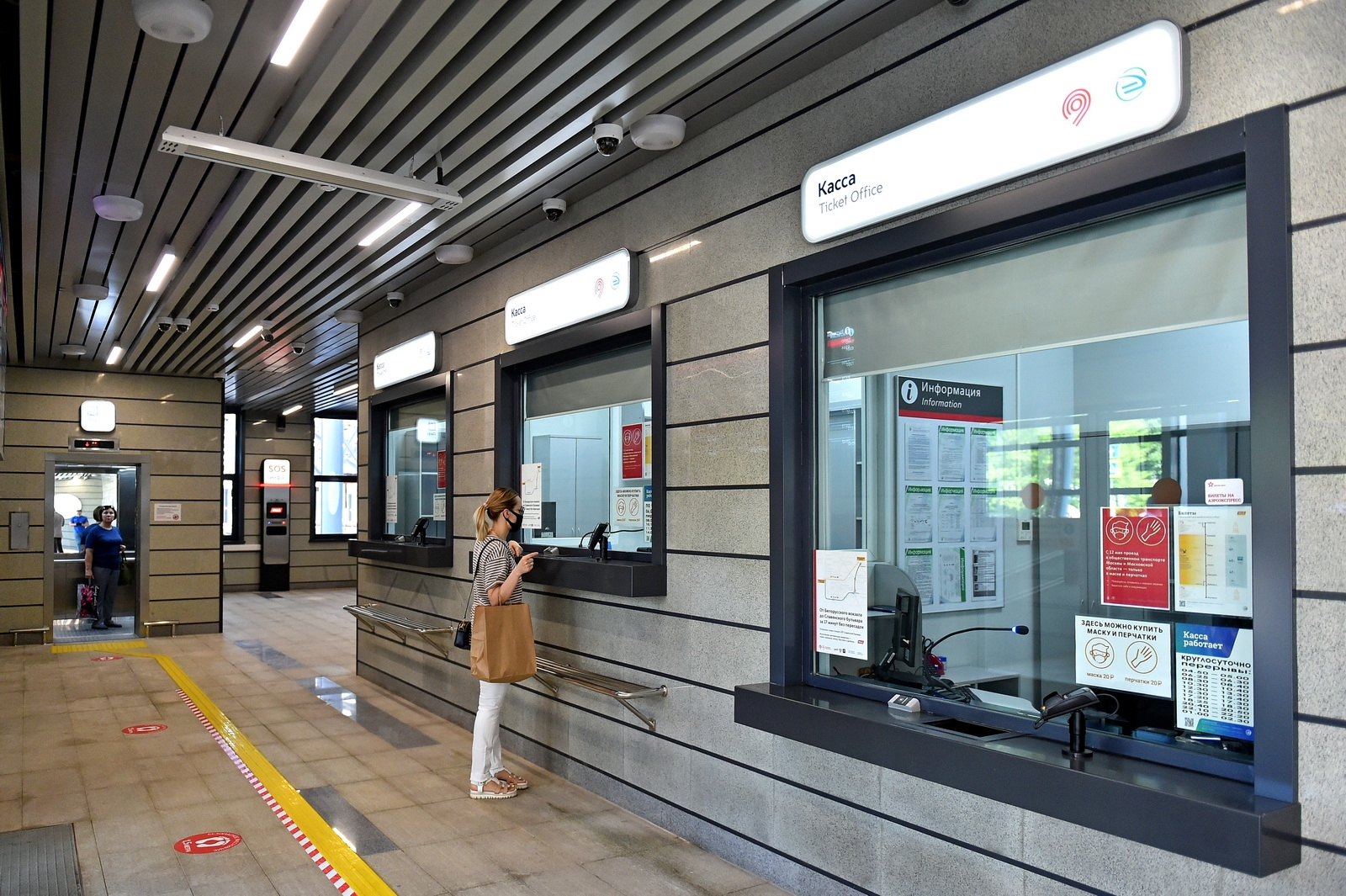

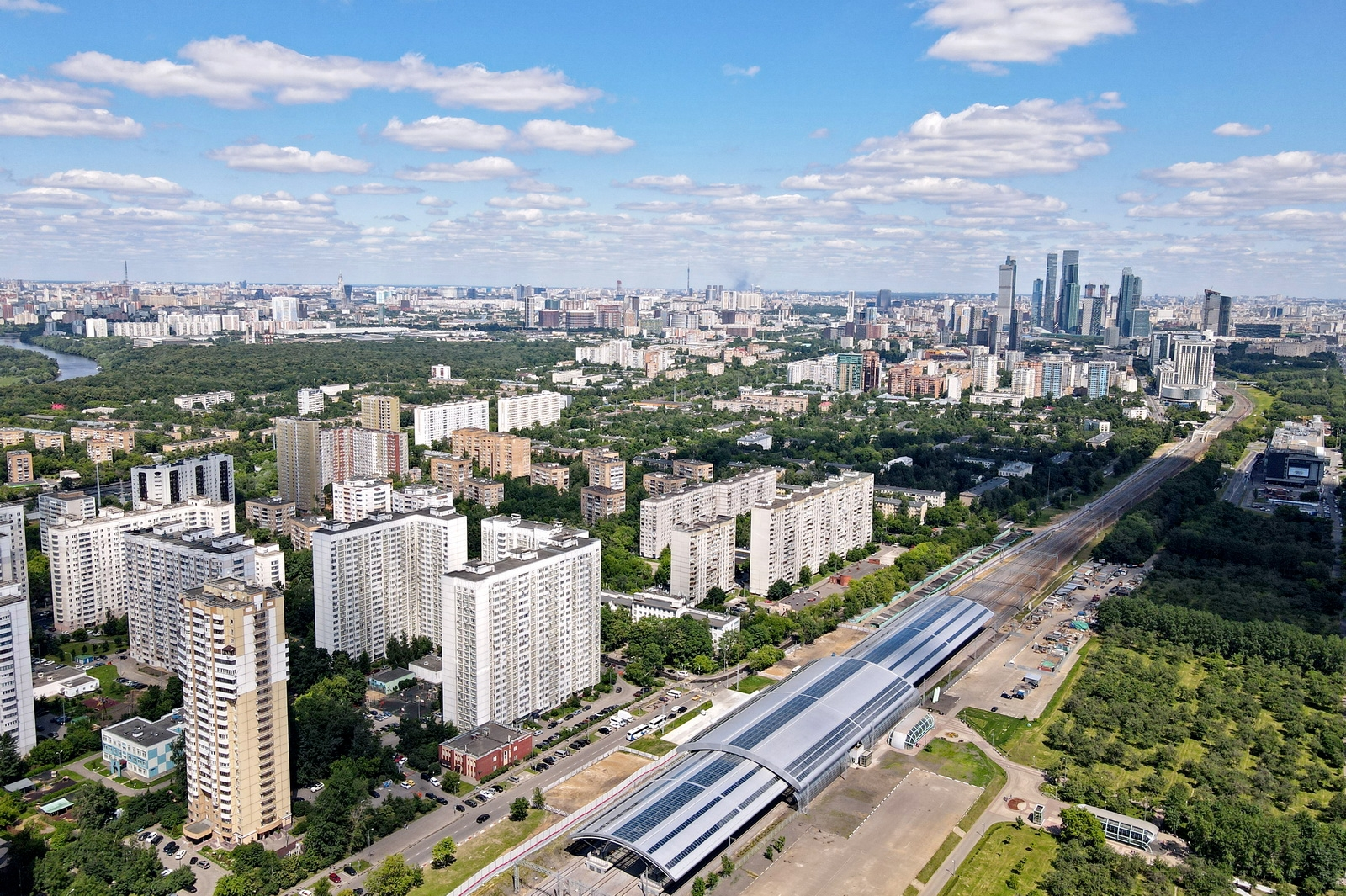

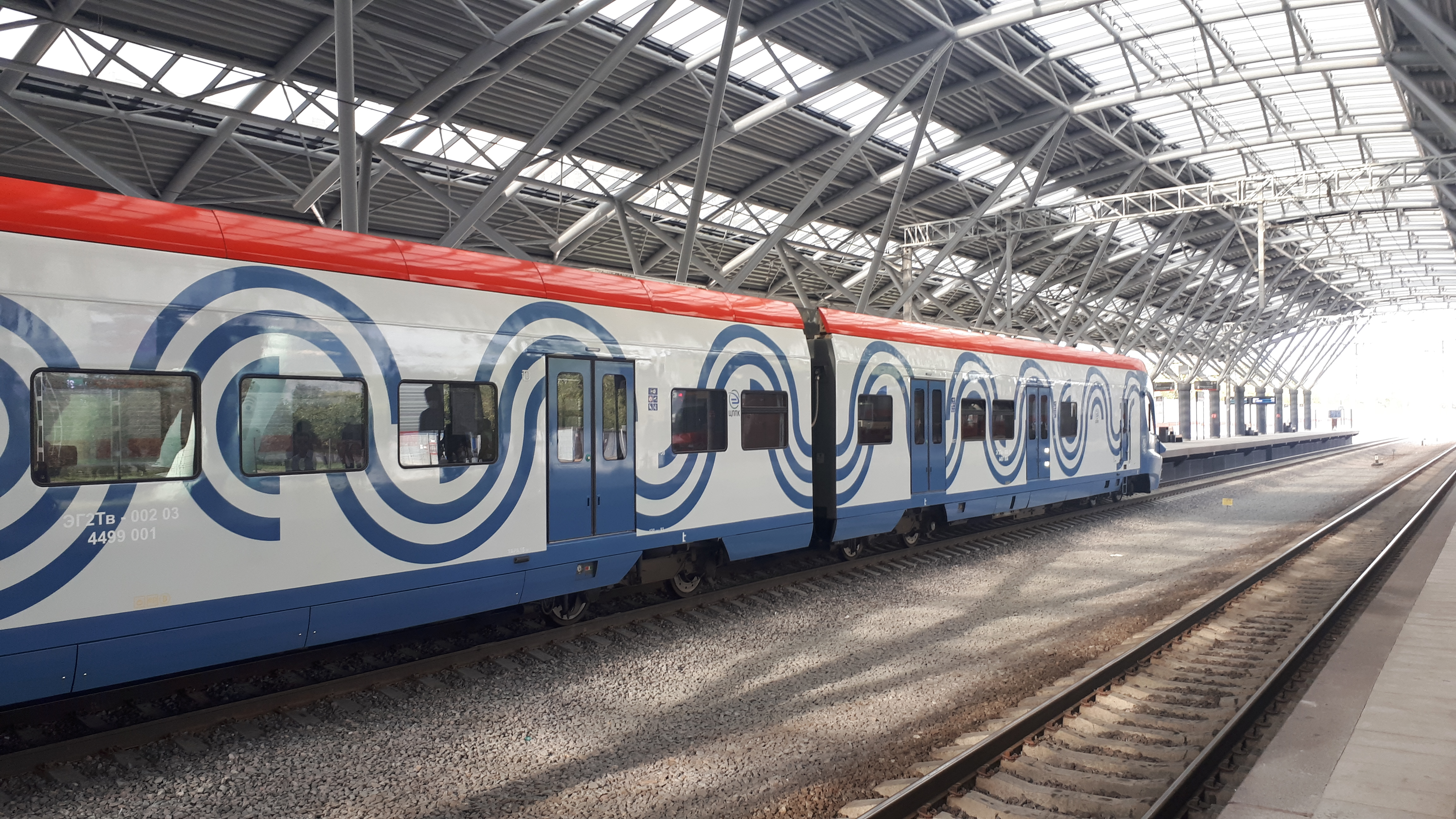
