= Testovskaya (Moskva-City) railway station =

Railway station in Moscow, Russia

Moskva-City Москва-Сити
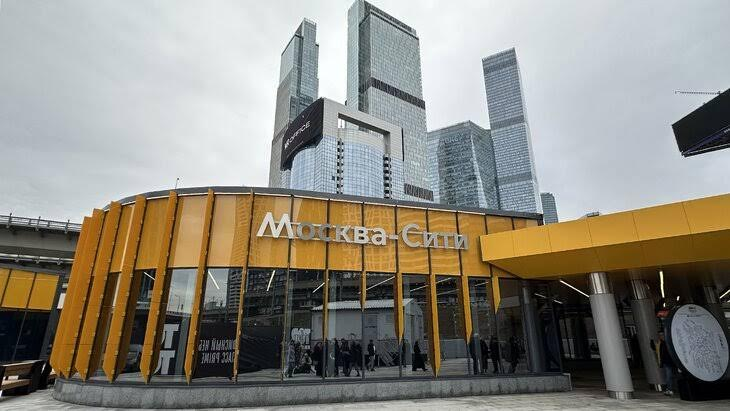
- Vestibule of Moskva-City station

General information
- Location: Moscow; Russia
- Coordinates: 55.7544°N 37.5318°E
- System: Moscow Railway platform
- Owner: Russian Railways
- Operator: Moscow Railway

History
- Former names: Testovskaya

Services
Preceding station	Moscow Central Diameters	Following station
Begovaya towards Odintsovo	Line D1	Fili towards Lobnya
Preceding station	Russian Railways	Following station
Begovaya towards Gagarin	Belorussky Suburban	Fili towards Moscow Belorussky
Preceding station	Aeroexpress	Following station
Fili towards Odintsovo	Odintsovo to Sheremetyevo Airport	Begovaya towards Aeroport Sheremetyevo
Route map
Location

Moskva-City is a railway station of Line D1 of the Moscow Central Diameters in Moscow. It was rebuilt in 2023-2026.

== Gallery ==
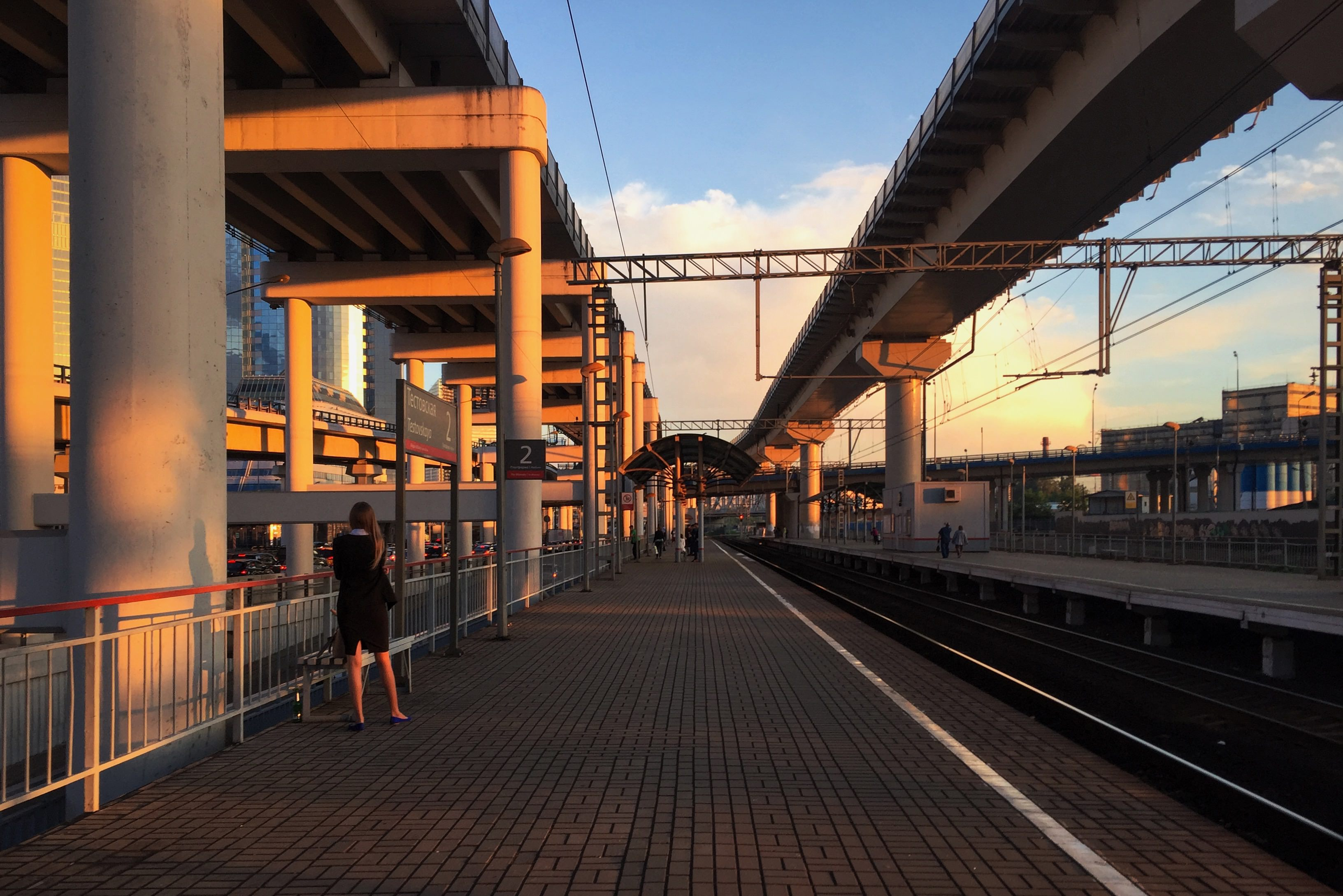
Testovskaya railway station in 2016

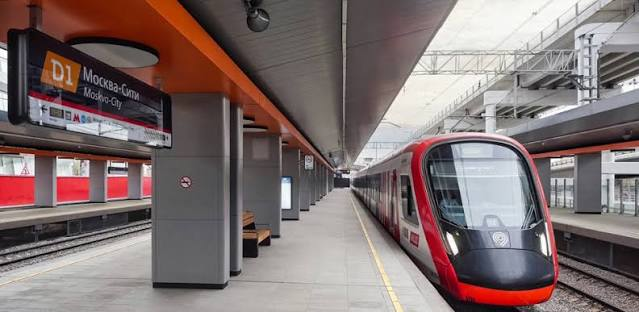
The station in 2026

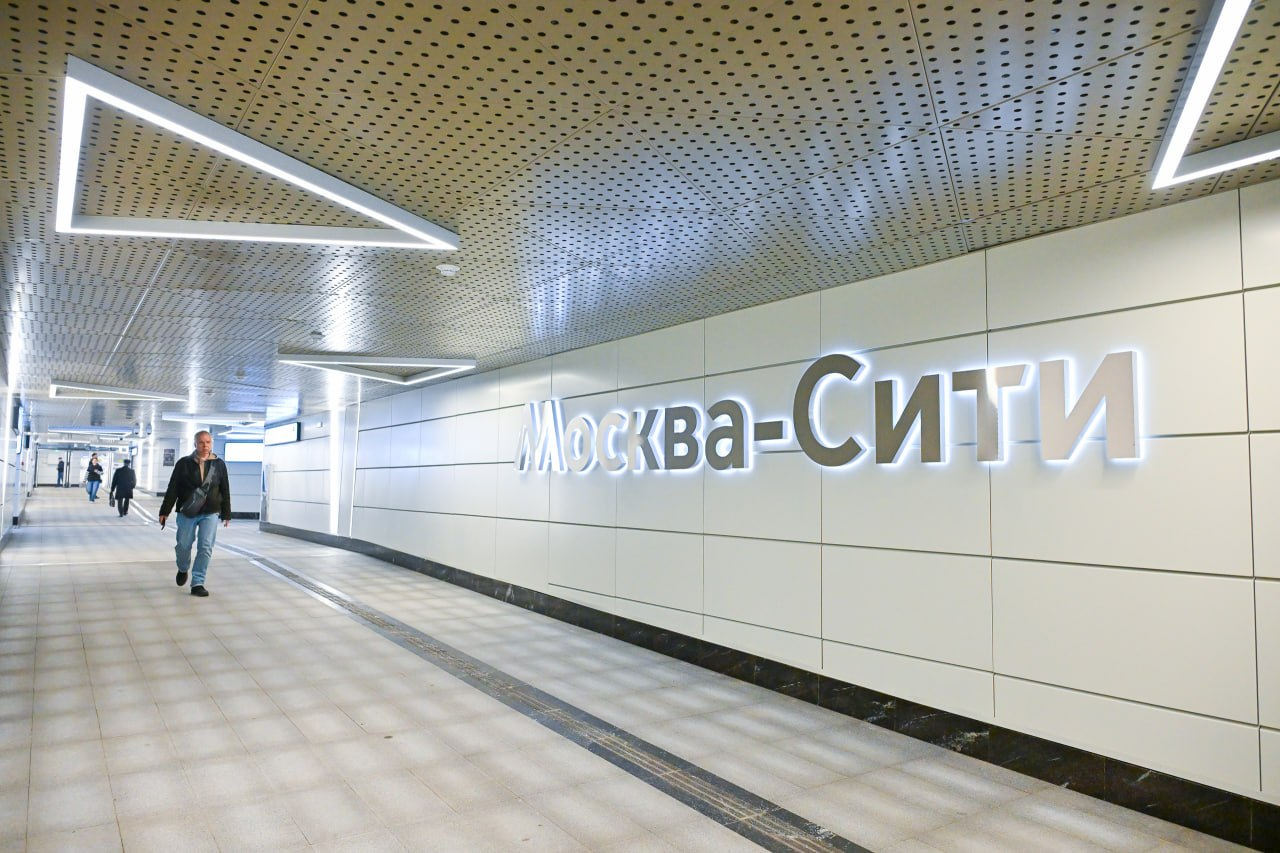
The station in 2026

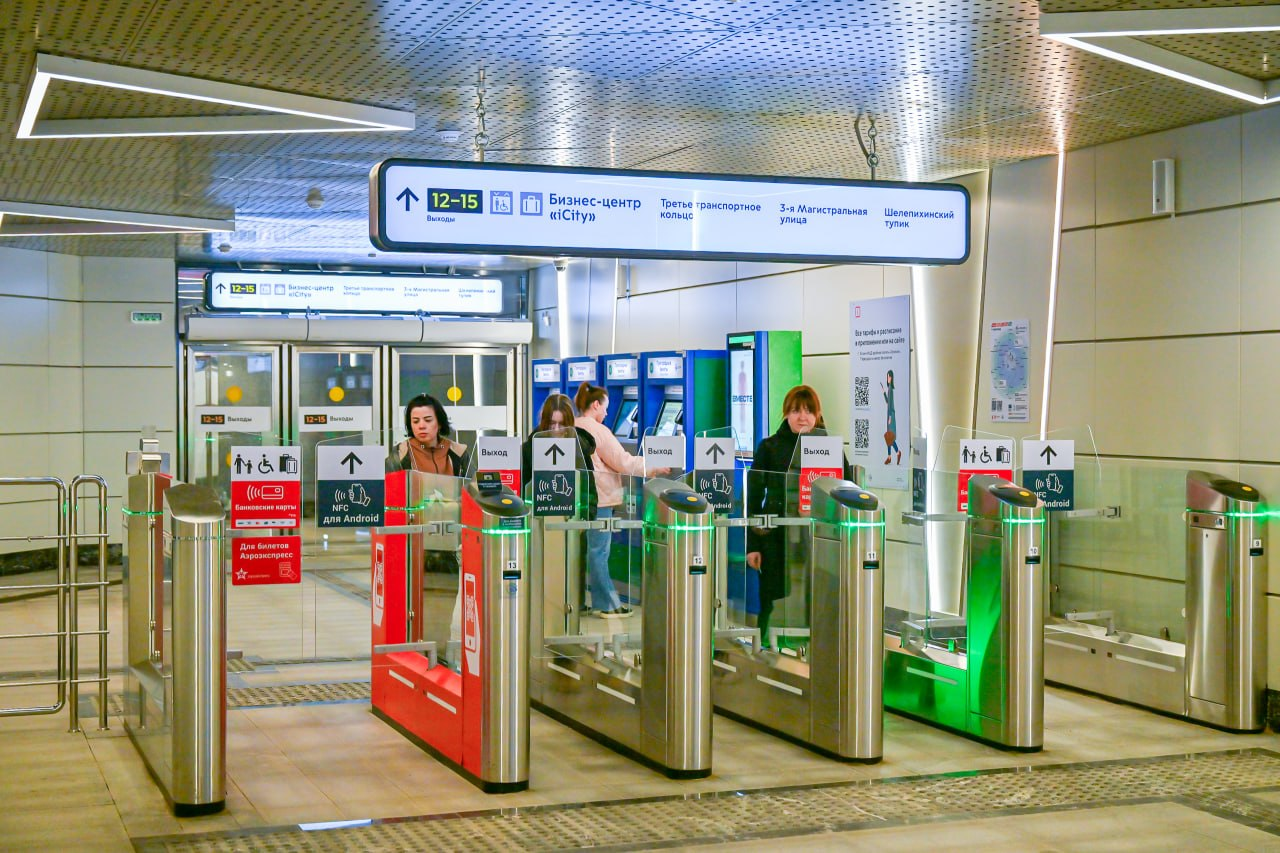
The station in 2026
