= Petrovsko-Razumovsky =

Petrovsko-Razumovsky (masculine), Petrovsko-Razumovskaya (feminine), or Petrovsko-Razumovskoye (neuter) may refer to:

- Petrovsko-Razumovskaya (Moscow Metro), a station of the Moscow Metro
- Petrovsko-Razumovskaya railway station (Leningradskaya line), a platform served by the Oktyabrskaya Railway in Moscow, Russia
- Petrovsko-Razumovskaya railway station (Savyolovskaya line), a platform served by the Moscow Railway in Moscow, Russia
