= Petrovsko-Razumovskaya railway station (Savyolovskoye line) =

Planned railway station in Moscow, Russia

Coordinates: 55°50′14″N 37°34′42″E

Petrovsko-Razumovskaya Петровско-Разумовская

General information
- Location: Moscow; Russia
- System: station
- Owner: Russian Railways
- Operator: Moscow Railway
- Connections: Petrovsko-Razumovskaya; Petrovsko-Razumovskaya

History
- Opened: 26 December 2025

Services
Preceding station	Russian Railways	Following station
Future services
Timiryazevskaya towards Moscow Savyolovsky	Savyolovsky Suburban	Okruzhnaya towards Savyolovo
Preceding station	Moscow Central Diameters	Following station
Okruzhnaya towards Odintsovo	Line D1	Timiryazevskaya towards Lobnya
Location

Petrovsko-Razumovskaya is a railway station on the Savyolovskaya line of Moscow Railway and Line D1 of the Moscow Central Diameters in Moscow. Construction of the station started in 2020 and it opened on 26 December 2025.

== Gallery ==
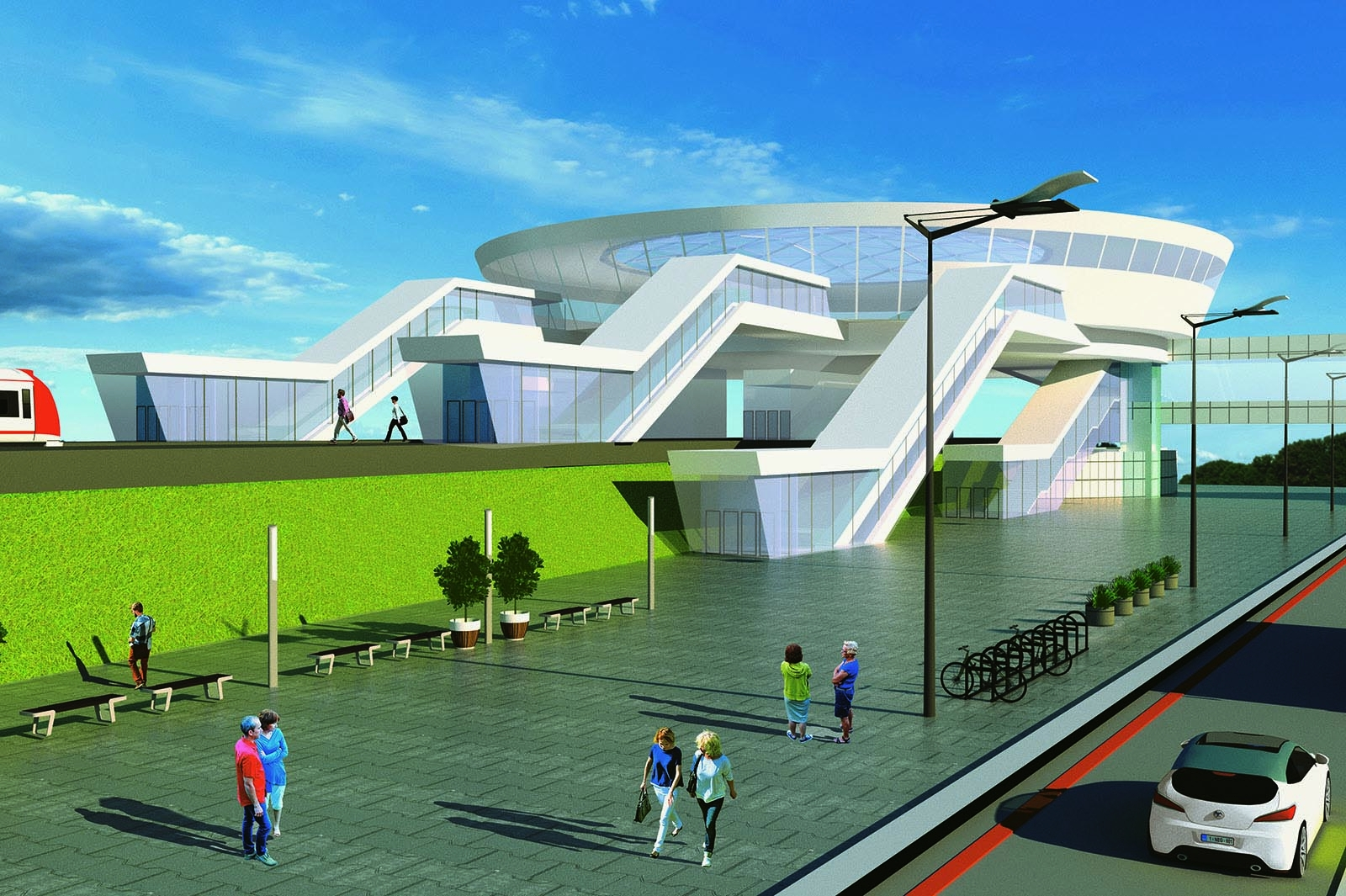
A project of Petrovsko-Razumovskaya transport hub

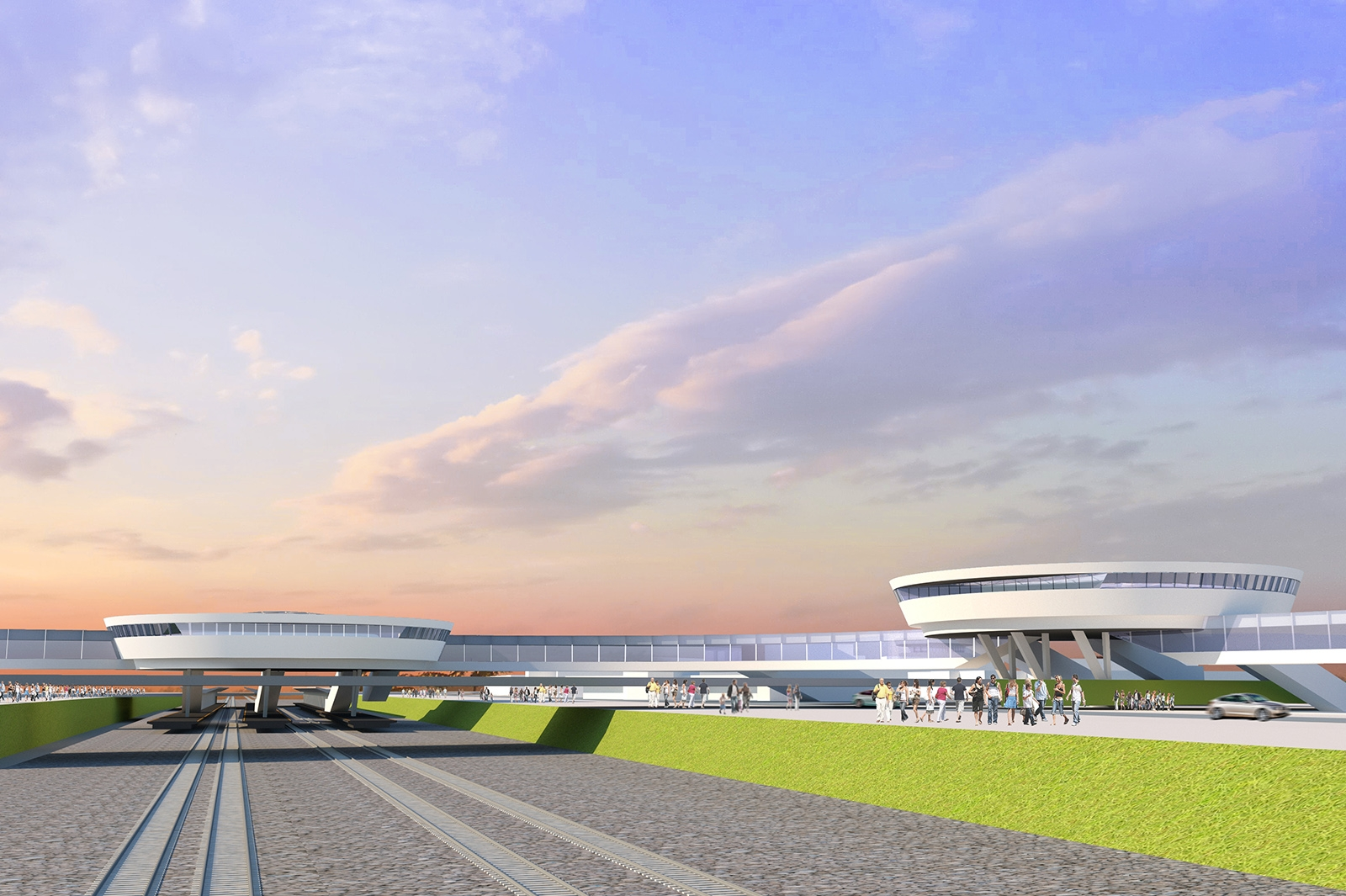
