= Likhobory =

Likhobory may refer to:

- Likhobory (Moscow Central Circle), a railway station on the Moscow Central Circle
- Likhobory railway station, a railway station on the October Railway

== See also ==
- Verkhniye Likhobory, a railway station on the Lyublinsko-Dmitrovskaya Line
