= Line D1 (Moscow Central Diameters) =

Suburban rail line in Moscow

Belorussko-Savyolovsky Diameter

Overview
- Native name: Белорусско–Савёловский диаметр
- Status: Operational
- Owner: Russian Railways
- Locale: Moscow
- Termini: Lobnya; Odintsovo
- Stations: 25 (3 planned)

Service
- Type: Commuter rail
- System: Moscow Central Diameters
- Operator(s): Central Suburban Passenger Company, Moscow Metro
- Rolling stock: EG2Tv

History
- Opened: 21 November 2019

Technical
- Line length: 52 km (32 mi)
- Track gauge: 1,520 mm (4 ft 11 27/32 in) Russian gauge
- Electrification: 3 kV DC overhead catenary

D1 (Russian: МЦД-1) or Belorussko-Savyolovsky Diameter (Russian: Белорусско–Савёловский диаметр) (Diameter 1; Yellow Diameter) is the first of the Moscow Central Diameters, a suburban network in Moscow which uses the existing infrastructure of Moscow Railway and provides a regular connection between Moscow and surrounding cities. MCD-1 runs from Lobnya via Dolgoprudny and Moscow to Odintsovo.

The line was opened on 21 November 2019, at the same day as D2. It uses the tracks and the stations of the Savyolovsky and the Belorussky suburban railway lines. The length of the line is 52 kilometres (32 mi), and the travel time between the termini is 80 minutes. These suburban directions have been connected earlier, and through suburban trains were running between them, therefore the initial investment to open the line was minimum.

Modified Ivolga trains have been serving the line since its opening with EP2D (Russian: ЭП2Д (Электропоезд Пригородный 2 тип Демиховский) trains.

== Construction and reconstruction ==
By the launch of traffic on the first diameter, weather modules or canopies, emergency call steles, benches, garbage cans and ticket windows for low mobility groups were installed on all platforms and stations.

Major reconstruction within the framework of the MCD organization affected the platforms Khlebnikovo, Vodniki, Dolgoprudnaya, Novodachnaya and Lobnya station.

Platforms of the Smolensk direction from Belorussky railway station to Odintsovo station were reconstructed in 2016-2018 as part of the construction of the third track.

On April 13, 2019, construction of the Slavyansky Boulevard platform began, where a warm transition to the metro station of the same name is organized.

On June 29, 2020, the station opened.

On May 27, 2019, the Skolkovo Innovation Center stop was opened to replace the Trigorka platform.

In August 2019, construction of the passenger distribution hall (concourse) at the Setun stop began, where escalators and elevators will be installed and a barrier-free environment will be created. The reconstructed station was handed over on June 30, 2020.

In April - October 2019, two additional platforms and four dead-end tracks for suburban electric trains departing from the station to the Smolensk direction were built at Belorussky railway station, which allowed to relieve the transit platforms. In 2020, the reconstruction of Bakovka began. The renovated station was delivered on January 14, 2021.

== Stations ==
Map of line

The stations between Mark and Setun are in Moscow, others are in Moscow Oblast.

Station Name		Transfers
English	Russian	Transfers
Lobnya	Лобня	
Sheremetyevskaya	Шереметьевская	
Khlebnikovo	Хлебниково	
Vodniki	Водники	
Dolgoprudnaya	Долгопрудная	
Novodachnaya	Новодачная	
Mark	Марк	
Lianozovo	Лианозово	Lianozovo
Beskudnikovo	Бескудниково	
Degunino	Дегунино	
Okruzhnaya	Окружная	Okruzhnaya; Okruzhnaya
Petrovsko-Razumovskaya	Петровско-Разумовская	Petrovsko-Razumovskaya; Petrovsko-Razumovskaya
Timiryazevskaya	Тимирязевская	Timiryazevskaya
Dmitrovskaya	Дмитровская	Dmitrovskaya; Dmitrovskaya
Savyolovskaya	Савёловская	Savyolovskaya; Savyolovskaya; Savyolovskaya
Belorusskaya	Белорусская	Belorusskaya; Belorusskaya; Belorusskaya
Begovaya	Беговая	Begovaya; Begovaya
Moskva-City	Москва-Сити	Moskva-City; Moskva-City; Moskva-City
Fili	Фили	Fili
Slavyansky Bulvar	Славянский бульвар	Slavyansky Bulvar
Kuntsevskaya	Кунцевская	Kuntsevskaya; Kuntsevskaya
Rabochy Posyolok	Рабочий Посёлок	
Setun	Сетунь	
Nemchinovka	Немчиновка	
Skolkovo	Сколково	
Bakovka	Баковка	
Odintsovo	Одинцово	
