= Belorussky suburban railway line =

Railway line in Russia

Belorussky Suburban Railway

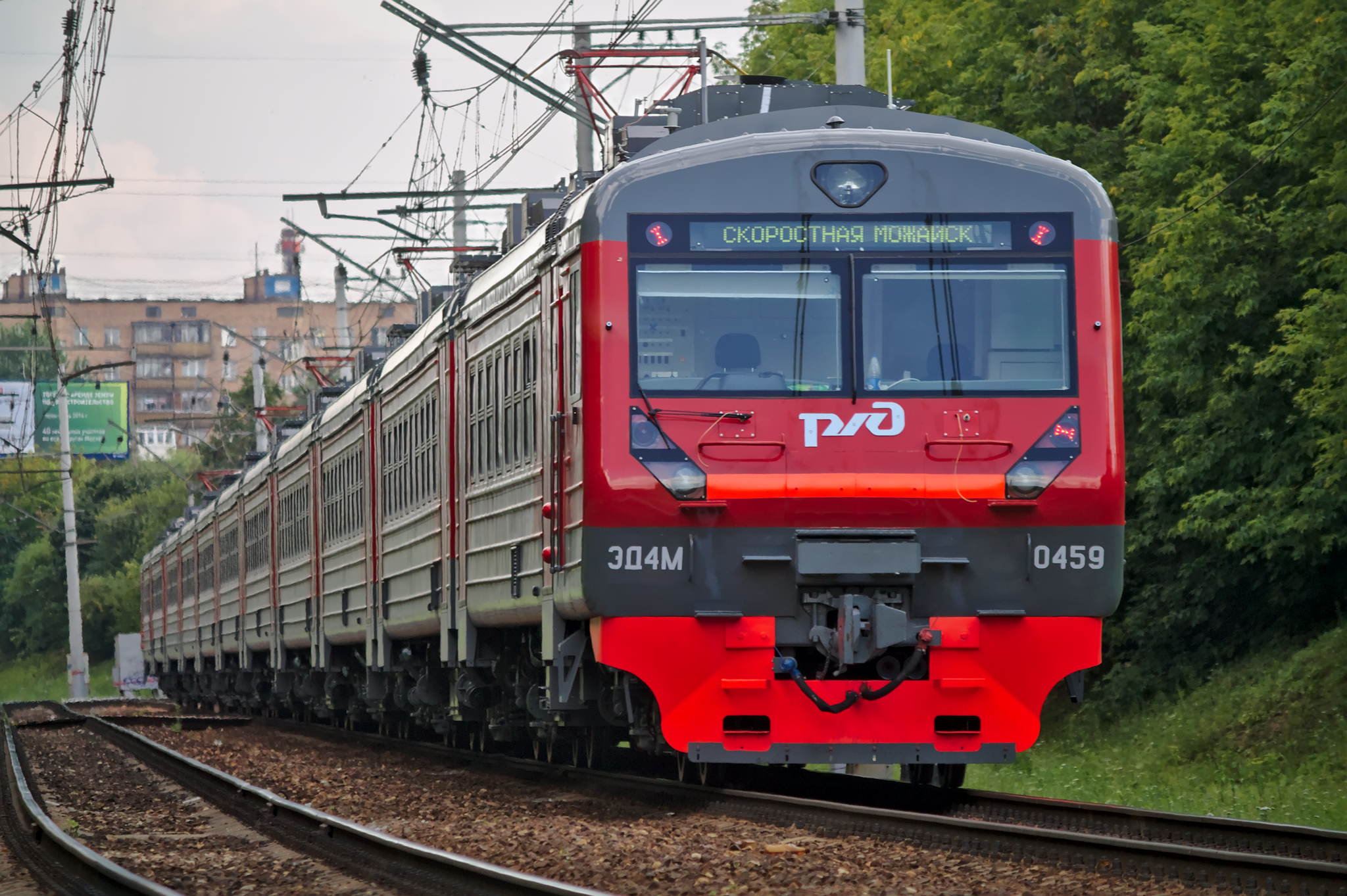

Overview
- Other name: Smolensk line
- Native name: Смоленское направление Московской железной дороги
- Owner: Government of Russia
- Locale: Moscow and Moscow Oblast
- Termini: Moscow Belorussky; Borodino
- Stations: 49 (including branches)

Service
- Type: Commuter rail Airport rail link
- System: Moscow Railway
- Operator(s): Russian Railways

Technical
- Line length: 119 km (74 mi)
- Track gauge: 1,520 mm (4 ft 11 27/32 in) Russian gauge
- Electrification: 3 kV DC overhead line

The Belorussky suburban railway line (Russian: Белорусское направление Московской железной дороги) is one of eleven railway lines used for suburban railway connections between Moscow, Russia, and surrounding areas in Moscow Oblast as well as parts of Smolensk Oblast. The line connects Moscow with the stations in the west, in particular, with the towns of Odintsovo, Golitsyno, Zvenigorod, Kubinka, Mozhaysk, and Gagarin.

Some of the suburban trains have their eastern terminus at Belorussky railway station in Moscow, while the majority continue onto the Savyolovsky suburban railway line. In the western direction, the suburban trains terminate at Usovo, Odintsovo, Golitsyno, Zvenigorod, Kubinka I, Dorokhovo, Mozhaysk, Borodino, and Gagarin. The line is operated by Moscow Railway. The tracks between Moscow Belorussky railway station and Odintsovo are also used by Line D1, one of the Moscow Central Diameters, and by the service to Sheremetyevo International Airport, provided by Aeroexpress.

The suburban railway line follows the railway which connects Moscow with Smolensk and Minsk. It is electrified everywhere. Between Moscow and Odintsovo, there are four tracks, west of Odintsovo there are two tracks. The distance between Moscow Belorussky railway station and Borodino is 119 kilometres (74 mi).

== History ==
The railway connecting Moscow and Smolensk was constructed in 1859 and opened in 1870. It was first known as Moscow — Smolensk railway, and since November 1871, when it was extended to Brest, as Moscow — Brest railway. The section between Moscow and Kuntsevo (which then was a separate town, currently Kuntsevskaya railway station) was electrified in November 1943. The electrification was extended to Setun in 1944, Odintsovo in 1947, Golitsyno in 1949, Zvenigorod in 1950, Usovo in 1957, Mozhaysk in 1958, and Borodino in 1959. The whole track to the border with Belarus and further is electrified, and the suburban service technically could be extended to Smolensk. However, direct suburban trains from Moscow to Gagarin and Vyazma were discontinued in 2015.

On 21 November 2019 Moscow Central Diameters started operation. Simultaneously, a direct connection to the Kursky suburban railway line was closed for passenger traffic.

== Stations ==
Following the standard notations in Russia, a railway stop below is called a station if it is a terminus or if it has a cargo terminal, and it is called a platform otherwise.

=== Moscow to Borodino ===
1. Moscow Belorussky railway station (station), transfer to Belorusskaya metro station of Zamoskvoretskaya line and Belorusskaya metro station of Koltsevaya line;
2. Begovaya railway station (platform), Begovaya metro station;
3. Testovskaya (platform), Mezhdunarodnaya metro station, Delovoy Tsentr metro station, and Delovoy Tsentr Moscow Central Circle station;
4. Fili (platform), Fili metro station;
5. Slavyansky Bulvar (platform), transfer to Slavyansky Bulvar metro station;
6. Kuntsevskaya (platform), transfer to Kuntsevskaya metro station;
7. Rabochy Posyolok (platform), connection to Usovo;
8. Setun (platform);
9. Nemchinovka (platform);
10. Skolkovo (platform);
11. Bakovka (platform);
12. Odintsovo (station);
13. Otradnoye (platform);
14. Pionerskaya (platform);
15. Perkhushkovo (platform);
16. Zdravnitsa (platform);
17. Zhavoronki (platform);
18. Dachnoye (platform);
19. Malye Vyazyomy (platform);
20. Golitsyno (station), connection to Zvenigorod;
21. Sushkinskaya (platform);
22. Petelino (station);
23. Chastsovskaya (platform);
24. Portnovskaya (platform);
25. Kubinka I (station), connection to the Greater Ring of the Moscow Railway;
26. Chapayevka (platform);
27. Polushkino (platform);
28. Sanatornaya (platform);
29. Tuchkovo (station);
30. Teatralnaya (platform);
31. Sadovaya (platform);
32. Dorokhovo (station);
33. Partizanskaya (platform);
34. Shalikovo (platform);
35. Kukarinskaya (platform);
36. 109 km (platform);
37. Mozhaysk (station), further connections to Gagarin and Vyazma;
38. Borodino (station), further connections to Gagarin and Vyazma.

=== Rabochy Posyolok to Usovo ===
1. Rabochy Posyolok (platform);
2. Romashkovo (platform);
3. Razdory (platform);
4. Barvikha (platform);
5. Ilyinskoye (platform);
6. Usovo (station);

=== Golitsyno to Zvenigorod ===
1. Golitsyno (station);
2. Zakharovo (platform);
3. Khlyupino (platform);
4. Skorotovo (platform);
5. Zvenigorod (station);
