= Kubinka I =

Railway station in Moscow Oblast, Russia

Kubinka I Кубинка I
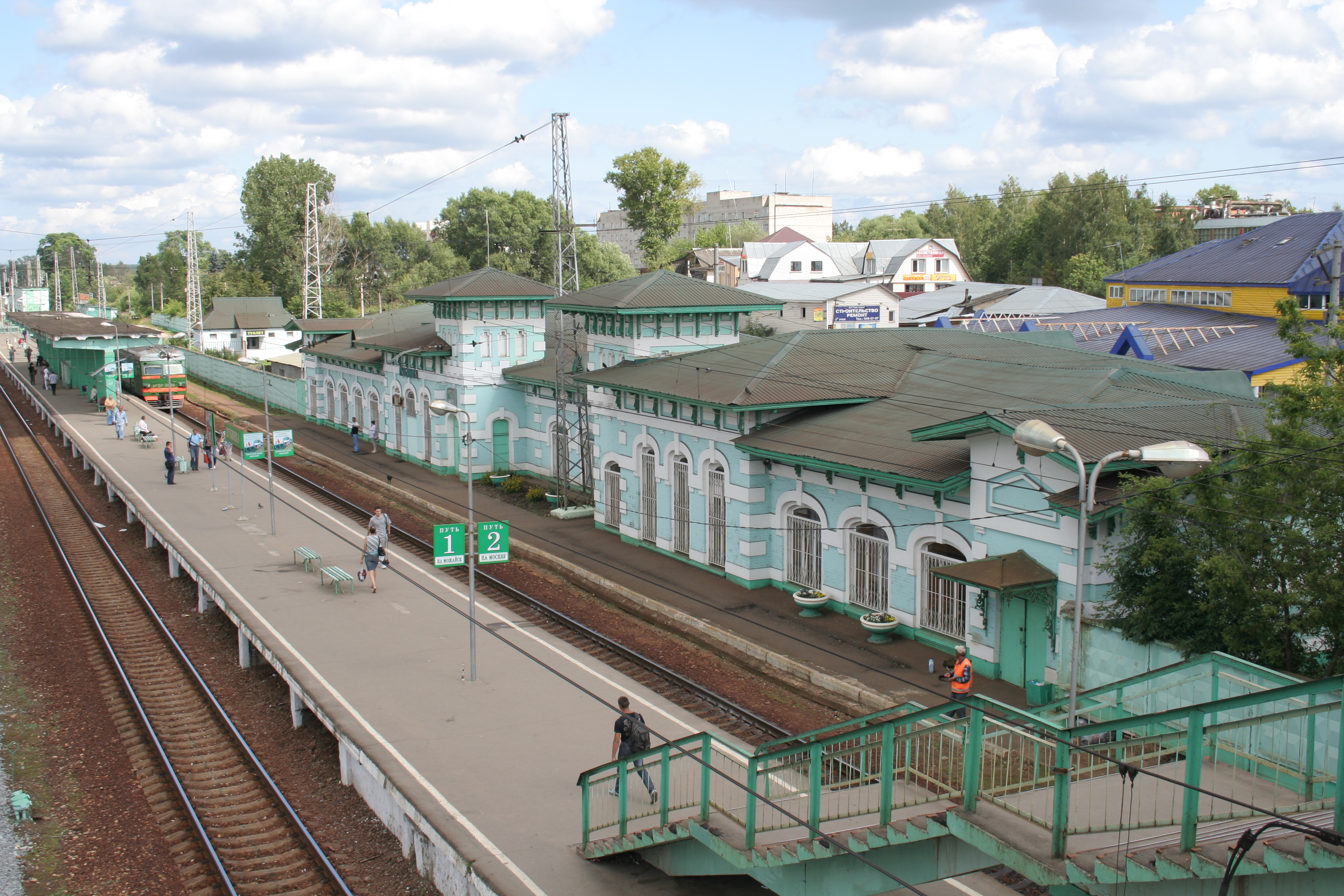

General information
- Location: Kubinka; Moscow Oblast; Russia
- Coordinates: 55.5787°N 36.69144°E
- System: Moscow Railway station
- Owner: Russian Railways
- Operator: Moscow Railway
- Platforms: 2

Construction
- Structure type: At-grade
- Parking: Yes
- Cycle facilities: Yes
- Accessible: Yes

Other information
- Fare zone: 7

History
- Opened: 1870

Services
Preceding station	Russian Railways	Following station
Chapayevka towards Gagarin	Belorussky Suburban	Portnovskaya towards Moscow Belorussky
Location

Kubinka I (Russian: Ку́бинка I), also called Kubinka-1 is a railway station of Belorussky suburban railway line in Kubinka town, Moscow Oblast, Russia.

== History ==
Kubinka station was established in 1870. In 1899–1900, a brick station building was constructed from the design of architect Ivan Strukov.

== Description ==
The station has two platforms: the island high (linked with the town by a pedestrian bridge) and the low side platform. The platforms are not connected to each other.

The station has a two-storey station building.

Kubinka has no turnstiles, but has ticket validators for the Moscow Central Diameters.

Near to the station the monument of the MiG-23 was erected in 2020.

== Traffic ==
Kubinka station provides connections in three directions: Belorussky suburban railway line, Greater Ring of the Moscow Railway and a special railway line to the Patriot Park.

== Gallery ==
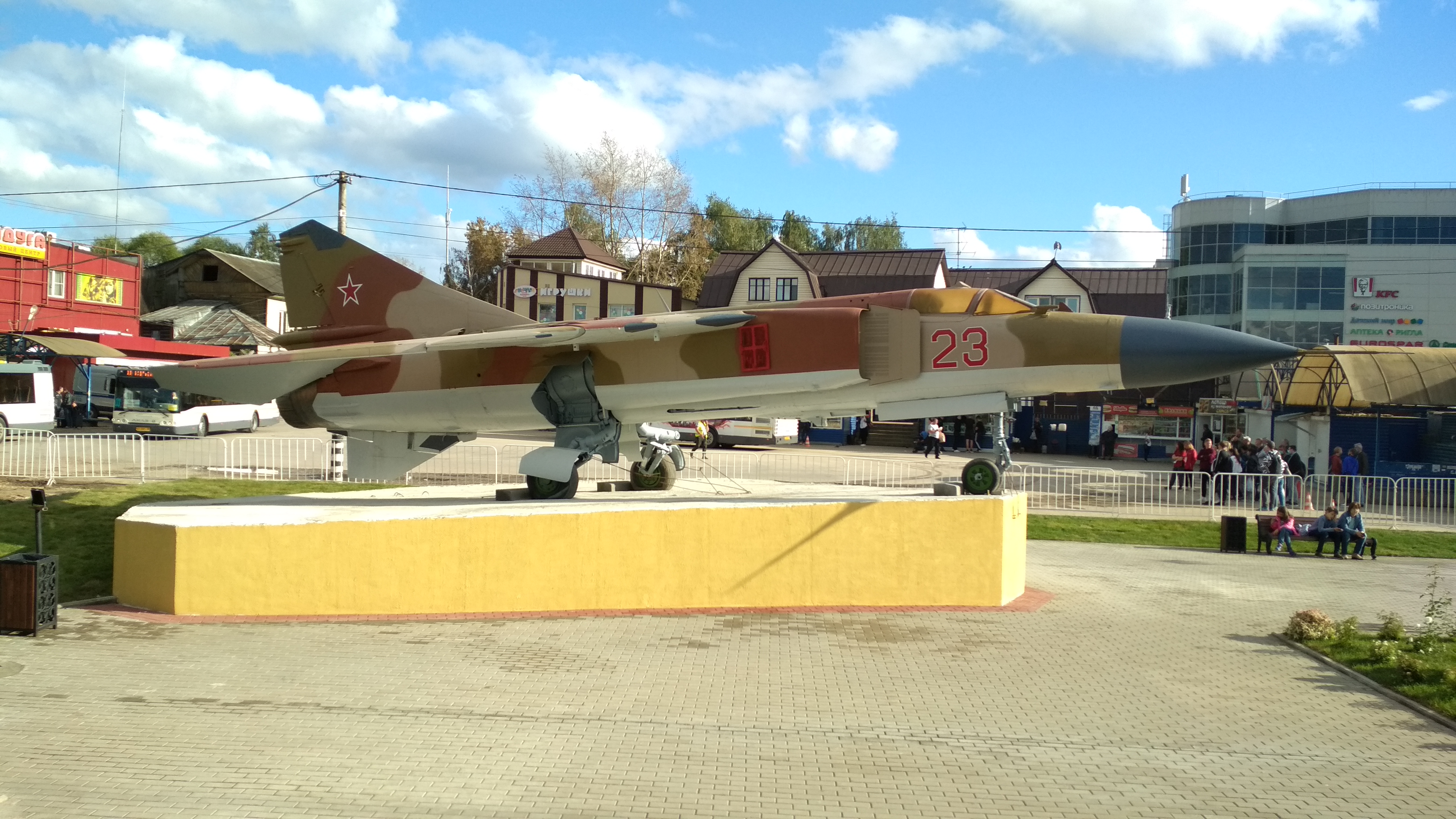
The MiG-23 monument

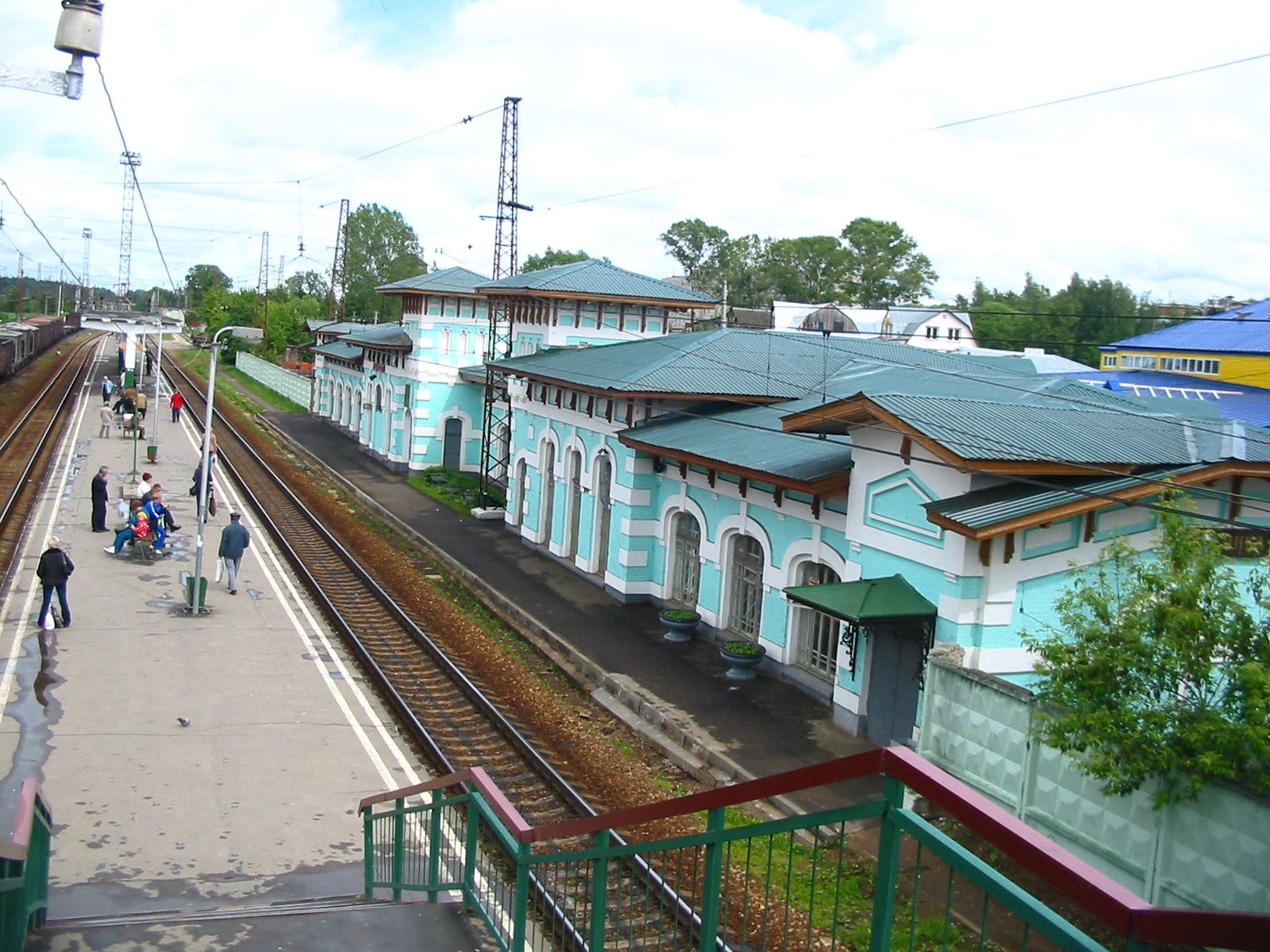
View of the station at 2004

== Links ==
- Turntables: on tutu.ru, on Yandex Raspisaniya
