= Mozhaysk railway station =

Railway station in Moscow Oblast, Russia

Mozhaysk Можайск
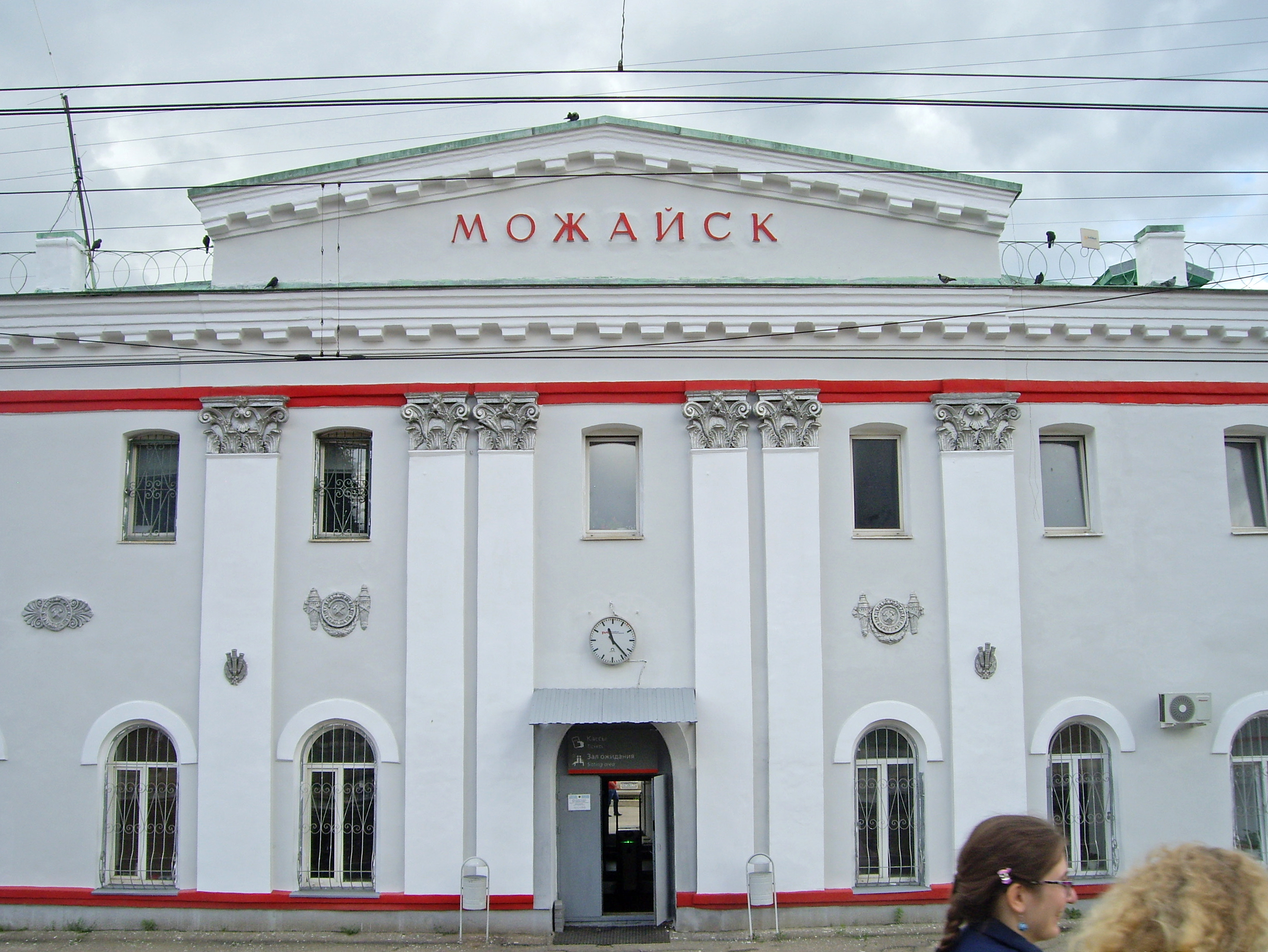

General information
- Location: Mozhaysk; Moscow Oblast; Russia
- Coordinates: 55.4924°N 36.035°E
- System: Moscow Railway station
- Owner: Russian Railways
- Operator: Moscow Railway
- Platforms: 2

Construction
- Structure type: At-grade
- Parking: No
- Cycle facilities: No
- Accessible: Yes

Other information
- Fare zone: 12

History
- Opened: 1870

Services
Preceding station	Russian Railways	Following station
Borodino towards Gagarin	Belorussky Suburban	109 km towards Moscow Belorussky
Location

Mozhaysk (Russian: Можа́йск, IPA: [ˈmɐˈʐajsk]) is a railway station of Belorussky suburban railway line in Mozhaysk town, Moscow Oblast, Russia.

== History ==
The station was founded in 1870.

Station building was built in 1856 — 1876.

== Description ==
The station placed in south-west end of Mozhaysk. The station has two platforms: 1 side low platform (not uses now) nearby station building and 1 island high platform. Platforms and the town linked by overground pedestrian bridge.

The station has turnstiles and ticket printing machines.

== Traffic ==
Mozhaysk station is a finish point for:

- some regular suburban trains from Moscow;
- all suburban expresses "REKS" Moscow — Mozhaysk;
- all regular suburban trains Gagarin — Mozhaysk and Vyazma — Mozhaysk.

All Lastochkas Moscow — Smolensk and regular suburban trains Moscow — Borodino (and reversed) have stops on the station.

Other inter-city trains go through the station without stopping.

== Gallery ==
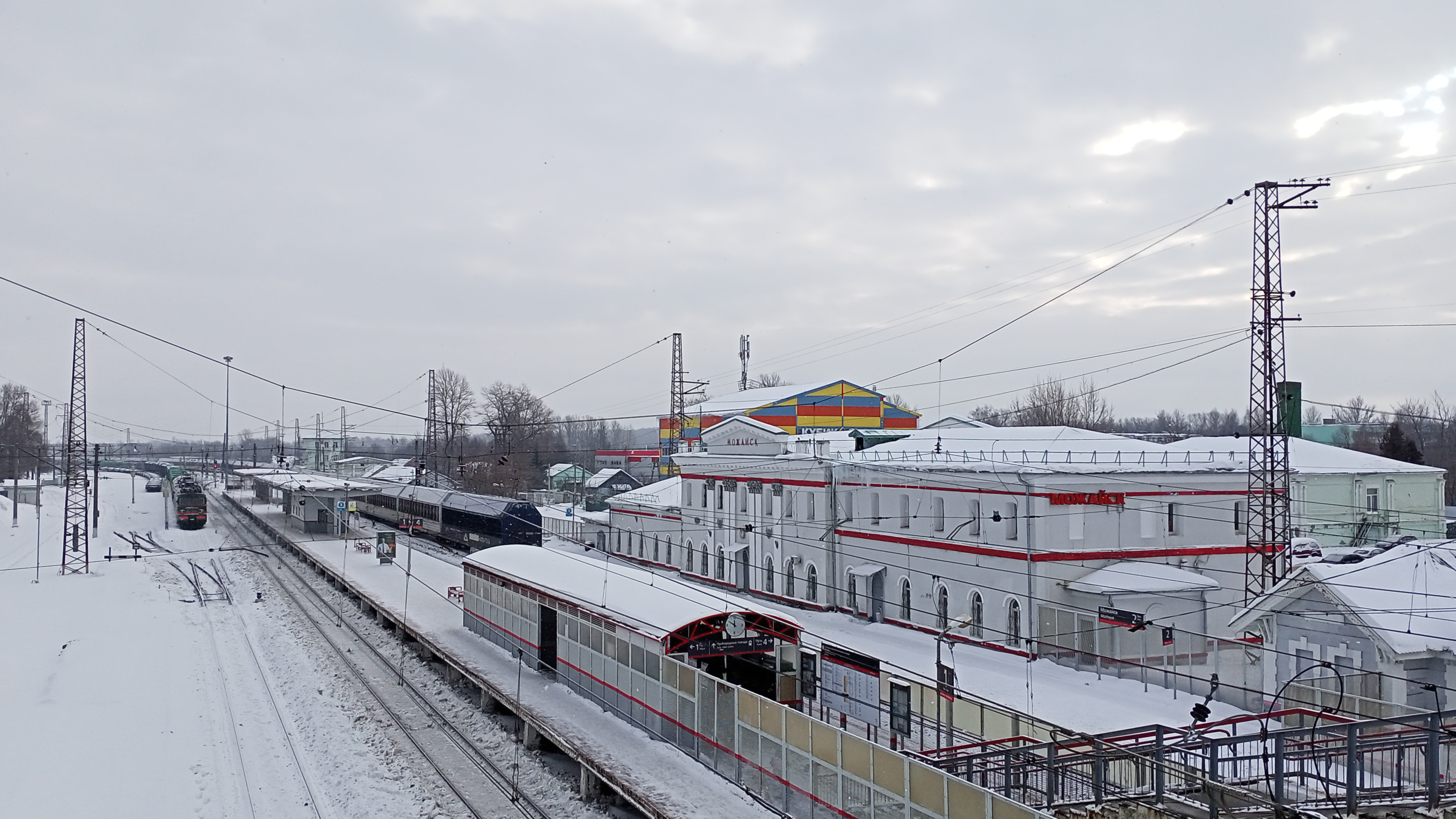
View of the station
2022

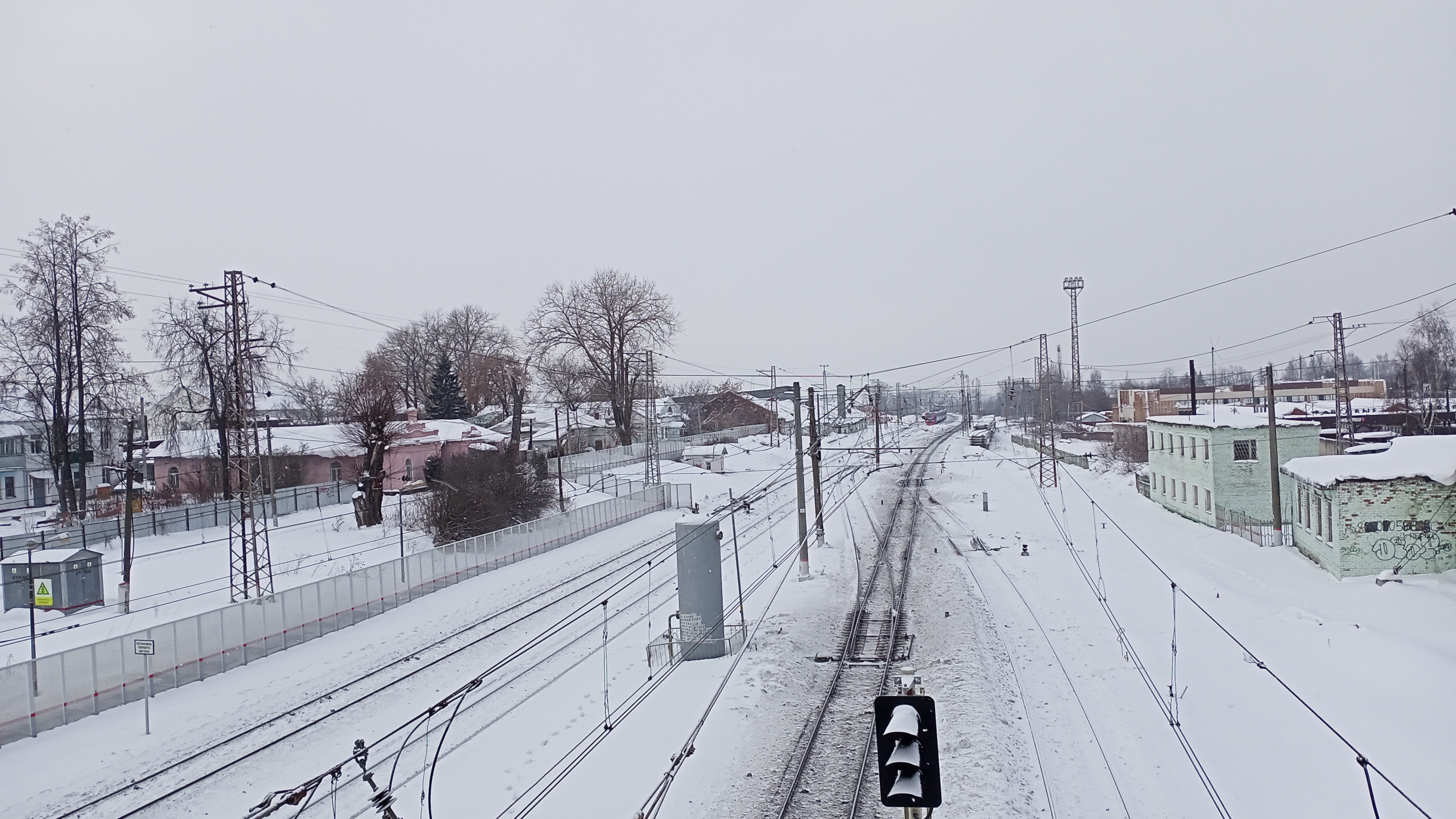
View (direction — to Borodino) of the station
2022

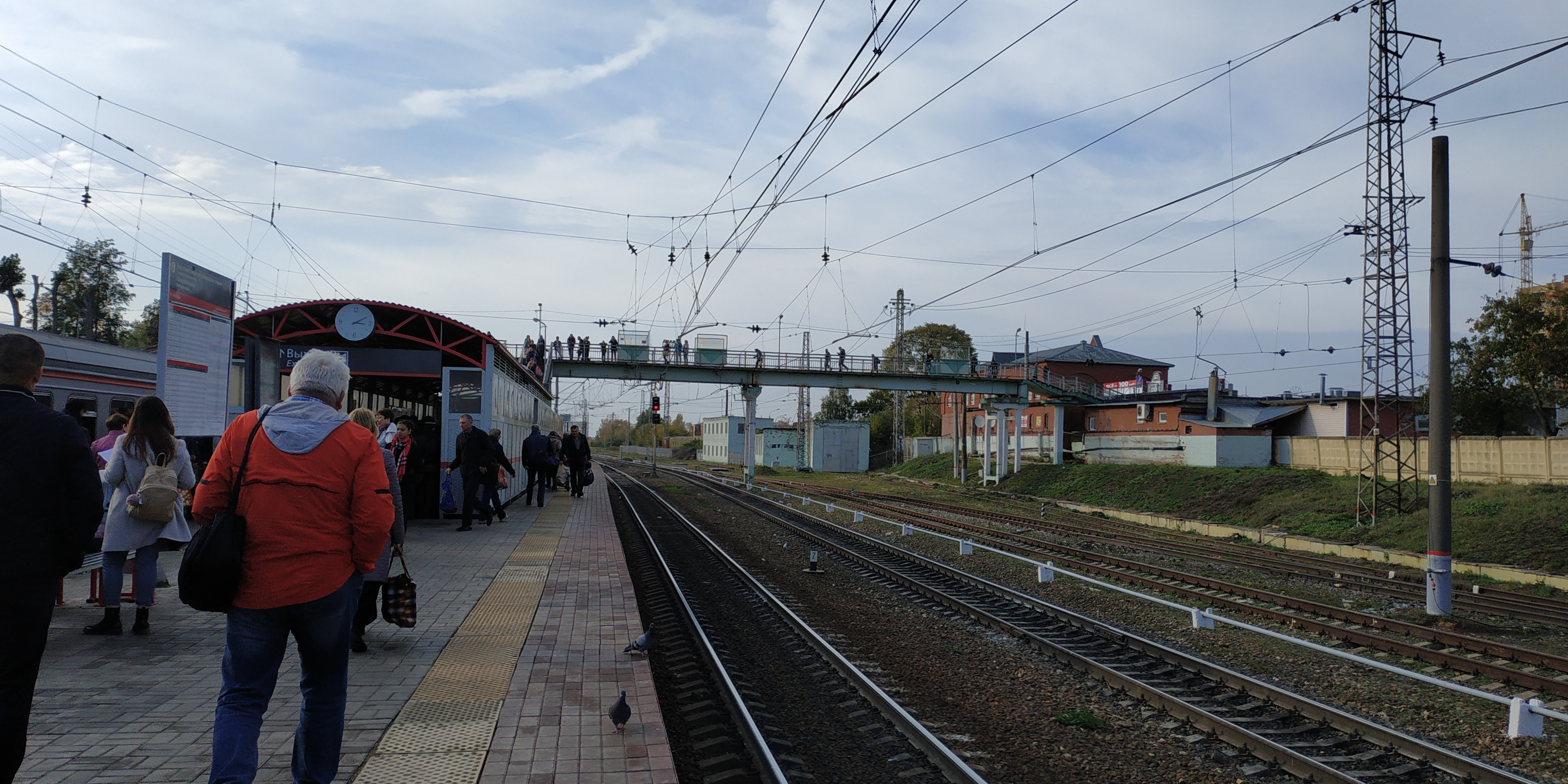
View (direction — to Borodino) of north-west side of the station
2018

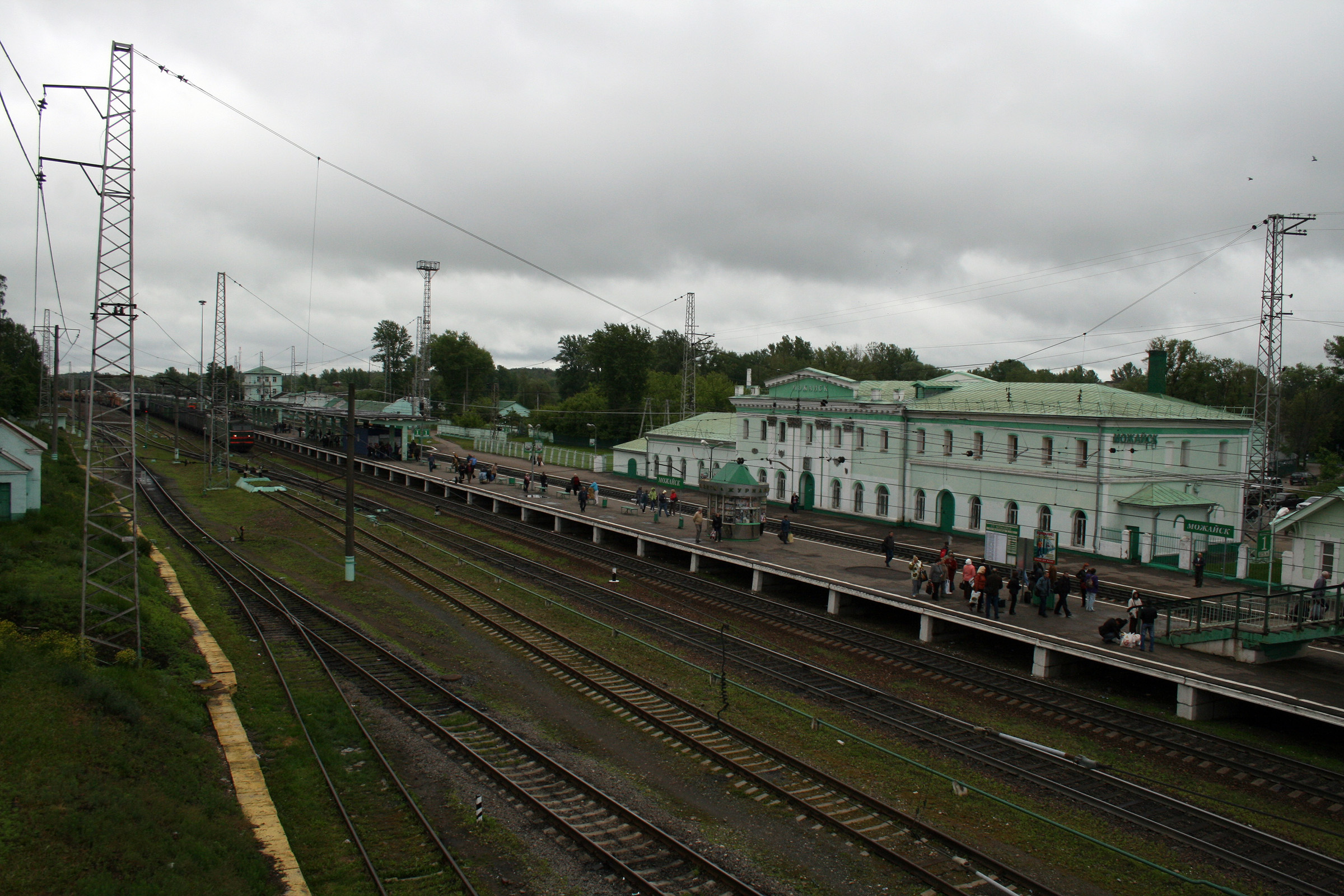
View (direction — to Moscow) of the station
2012 г.

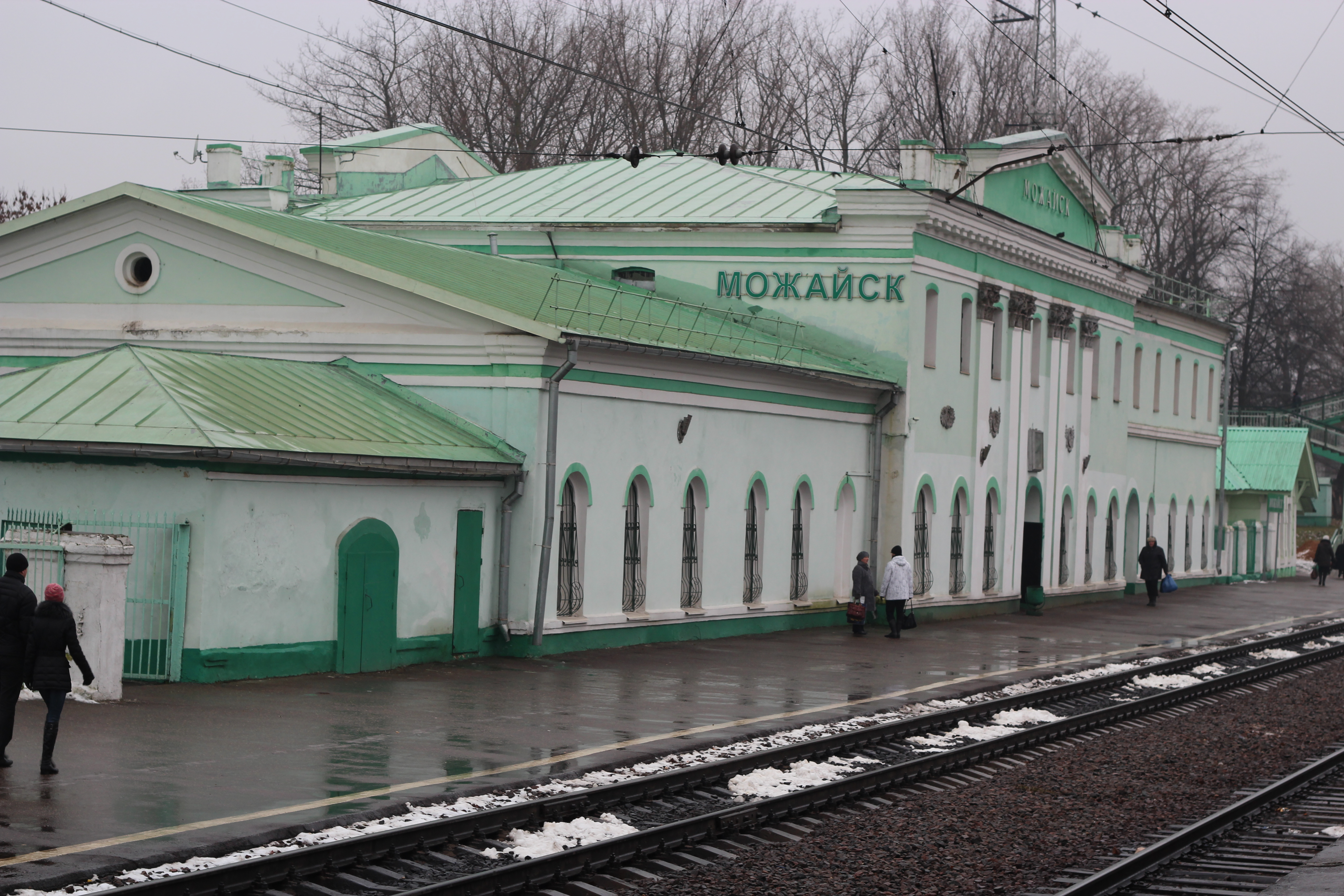
View (direction — to Borodino) of the station
2011

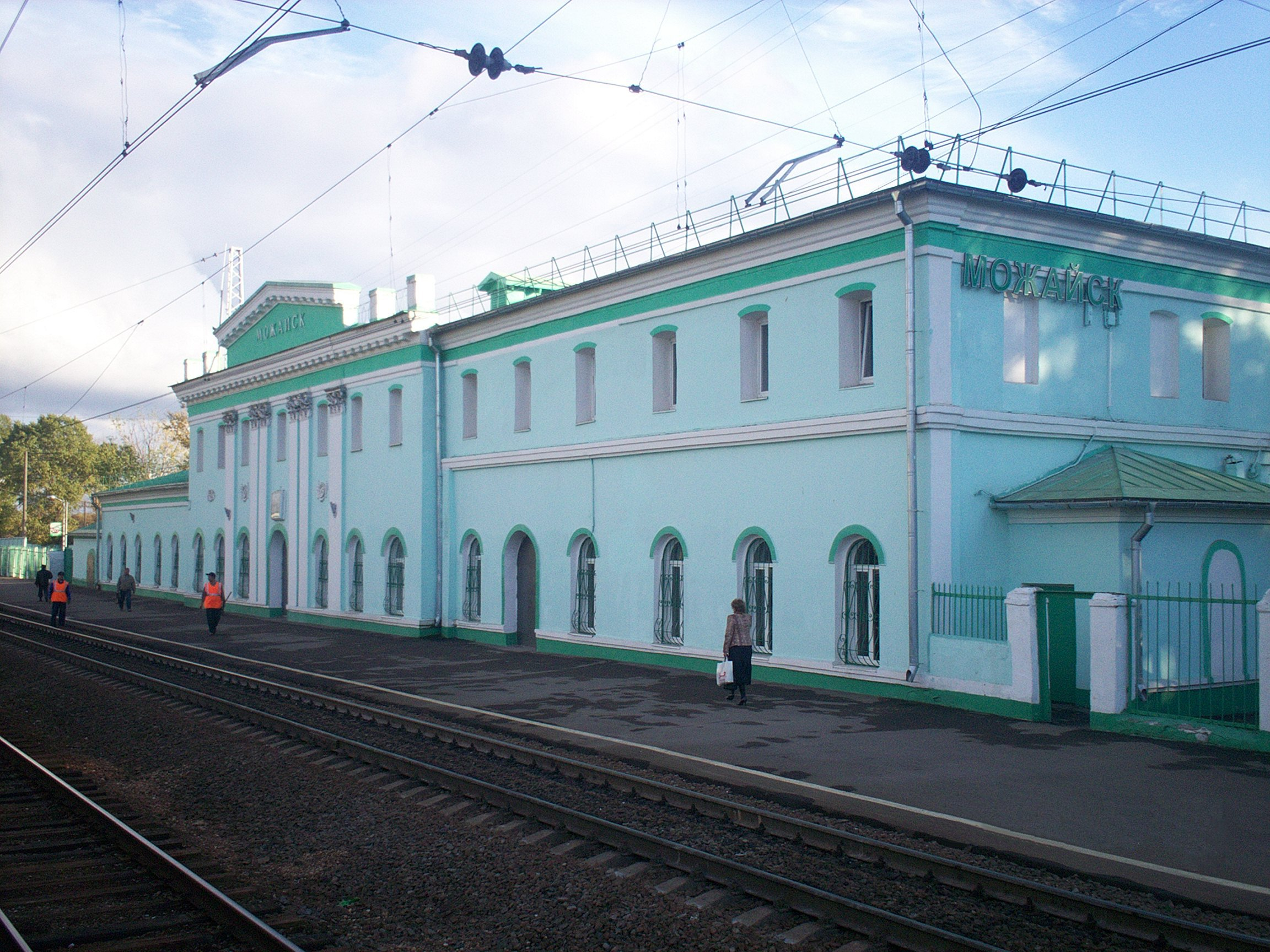
View (direction — to Moscow) of the station
2007
