= Likhobory railway station =

Railway station in Moscow, Russia

Likhobory Лихоборы

General information
- Location: Moscow; Russia
- Coordinates: 55.85°N 37.5525°E
- System: October Railway platform
- Owner: Russian Railways
- Operator: October Railway
- Platforms: 2
- Tracks: 4
- Connections: Likhobory

Construction
- Structure type: At-grade

Other information
- Fare zone: 2

History
- Opened: 1946
- Former names: NATI

Services
| Preceding station | Russian Railways | Following station |
|---|---|---|
| Mosselmash towards Tver | Leningradsky Suburban | Petrovsko-Razumovskaya towards Moscow Leningradsky |
| Preceding station | Moscow Central Diameters | Following station |
Proposed
| Mosselmash towards Kryukovo | Line D3 | Petrovsko-Razumovskaya towards Ippodrom |
Location

Likhobory (Russian: Лихоборы; NATI until 2020) is a station on the main course (Moscow — Saint Petersburg) of the October railway, located in northwest Moscow.

The station consists of two side passenger platforms connected by a pedestrian overpass. Initially, there was a platform on the third (central) track with a length of 4 cars, but it was used only when the traffic on the adjacent track was completely closed, and in 2010 it was dismantled. There is a transfer to the Likhobory station of the Moscow Central Circle. On January 30, 2020, a covered passage between the two stations was opened.

== History ==
The stopping point was built in 1946 and named NATI after the Scientific Automotive Institute (NAMI) located nearby, which from 1931 to 1946 was called the Scientific Automobile and Tractor Institute (NATI).

In 2011–2014, due to the construction of the fourth main track, the station was completely rebuilt. Second platform (from Moscow) was dismantled and replaced with a temporary wooden one. From October 2012 to April 2014, the station was completely closed.

In June 2018, a Likobory depot of the Metro Line 10 was opened near the station. In February 2020, the stopping point NATI was renamed "Likhobory" following the opening of a new passage to the MCC station of the same name.

== Service ==
The station is located in a former industrial area; before the opening of the Likhobory MCC station, only a small part of the trains stopped at NATI. After the opening of the MCC, from December 2016 all suburban trains stops there except for the Lastochka express trains Moscow — Kryukovo and Moscow — Tver.

In 2022 Likhobory will be included in MCD 3 suburban rail line.
