= Petrovsko-Razumovskaya railway station (Leningradskoye line) =

Railway station in Moscow, Russia

Petrovsko-Razumovskaya Петровско-Разумовская

General information
- Location: Moscow; Russia
- Coordinates: 55.8396°N 37.5687°E
- System: Oktyabrskaya Railway platform
- Owner: Russian Railways
- Operator: Oktyabrskaya Railway
- Connections: Petrovsko-Razumovskaya; Petrovsko-Razumovskaya

Services
Preceding station	Russian Railways	Following station
Likhobory towards Tver	Leningradsky Suburban	Ostankino towards Moscow Leningradsky
Proposed
Kryukovo towards Saint Petersburg	Moscow–Saint Petersburg HSR	Moscow Terminus
Future services
Preceding station	Moscow Central Diameters	Following station
Likhobory towards Kryukovo	Line D3	Ostankino towards Ippodrom
Location

Petrovsko-Razumovskaya is a railway station on the Leningradskaya line of Oktyabrskaya Railway and prospective Line D3 of the Moscow Central Diameters in Moscow. According to the current plans, the station will be rebuilt. This station will also serve as a stopping point for Moscow–Saint Petersburg high-speed railway.

== Gallery ==
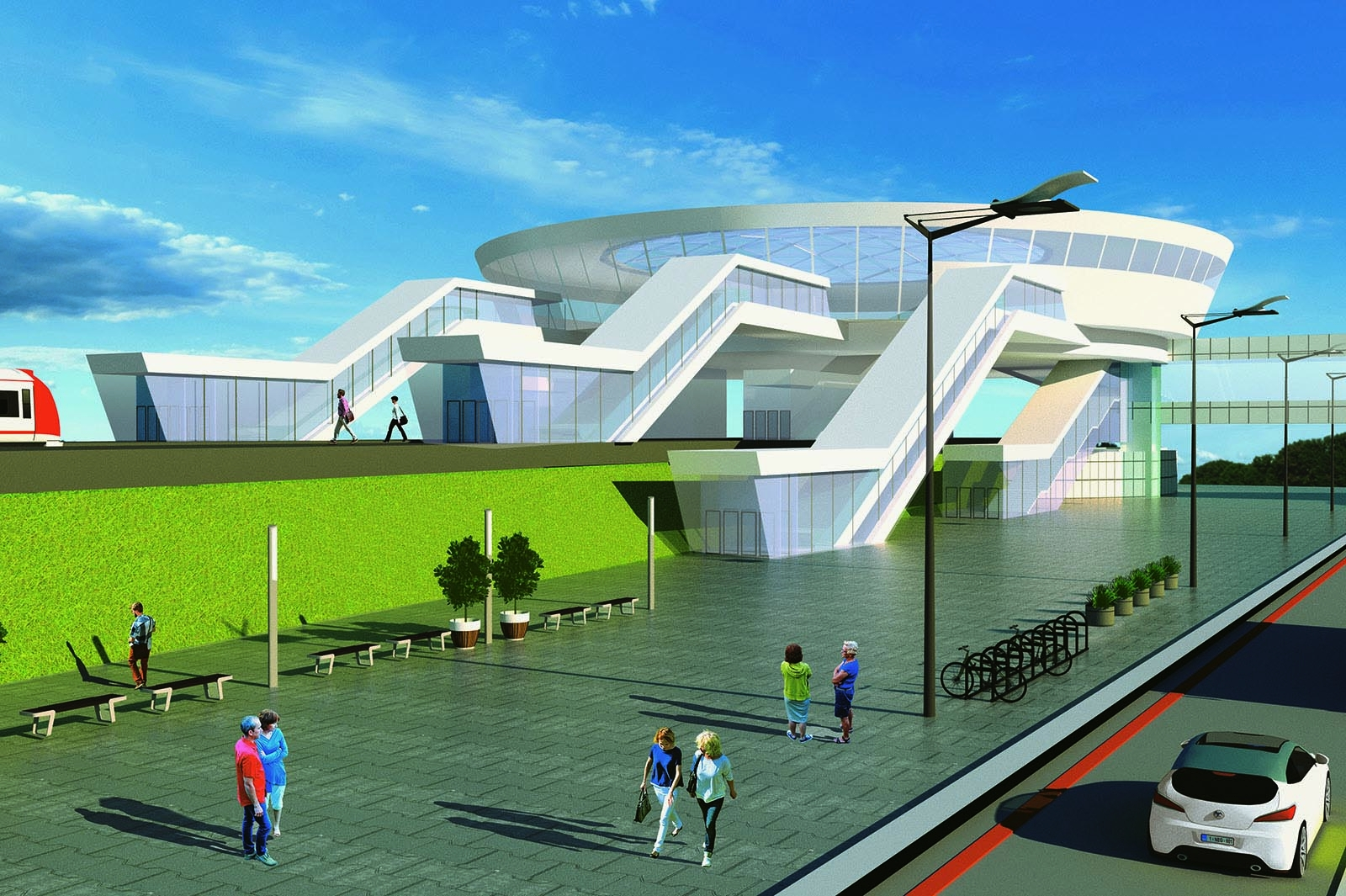

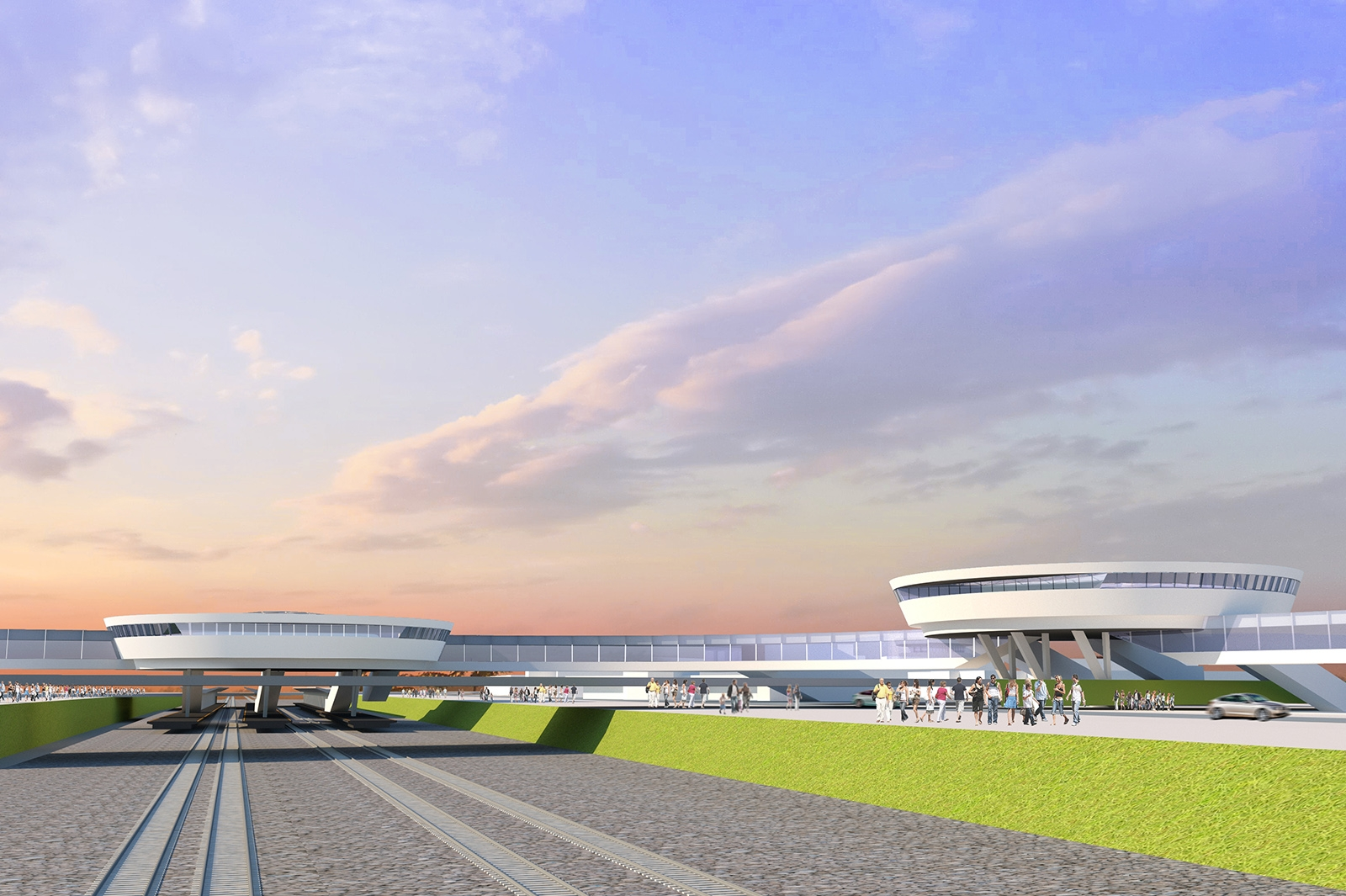
