= Lobnya railway station =

Railway station in Moscow Oblast, Russia

Lobnya Лобня
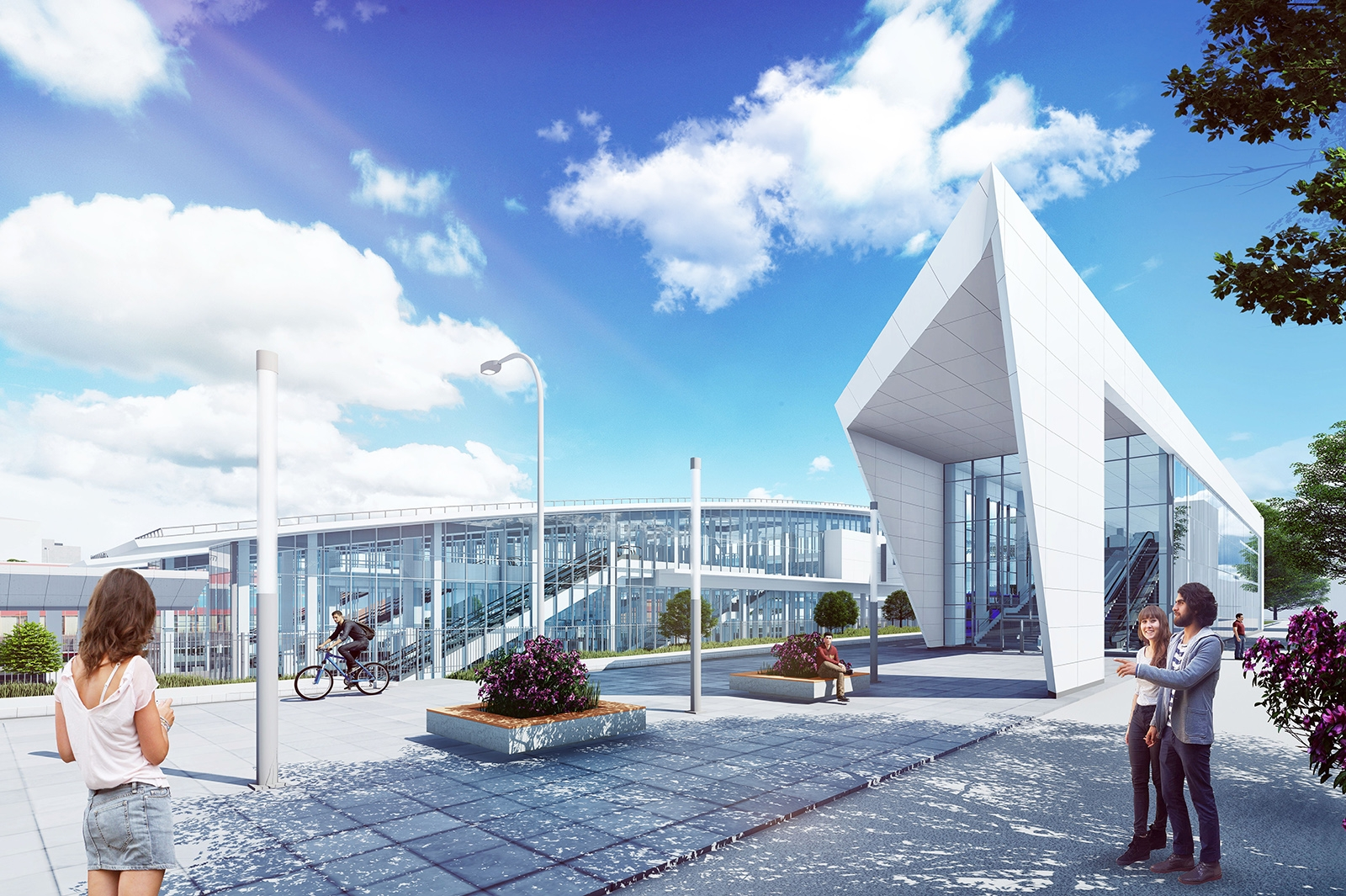

General information
- Location: Lobnya, Moscow Oblast; Russia
- Coordinates: 56.0135°N 37.4853°E
- System: Moscow Railway platform
- Owner: Russian Railways
- Operator: Central Suburban Passenger Company
- Platforms: 3
- Tracks: 9

Construction
- Structure type: At-grade

History
- Opened: 1901

Services
Preceding station	Moscow Central Diameters	Following station
Sheremetyevskaya towards Odintsovo	Line D1	Terminus
Route map
Location

Lobnya is a terminus railway station for Line D1 of the Moscow Central Diameters in Moscow Oblast and intermediate for other trains towards Dmitrov and other cities. It was opened in 1901 and will be rebuilt in 2021 - 2024.

== Gallery ==
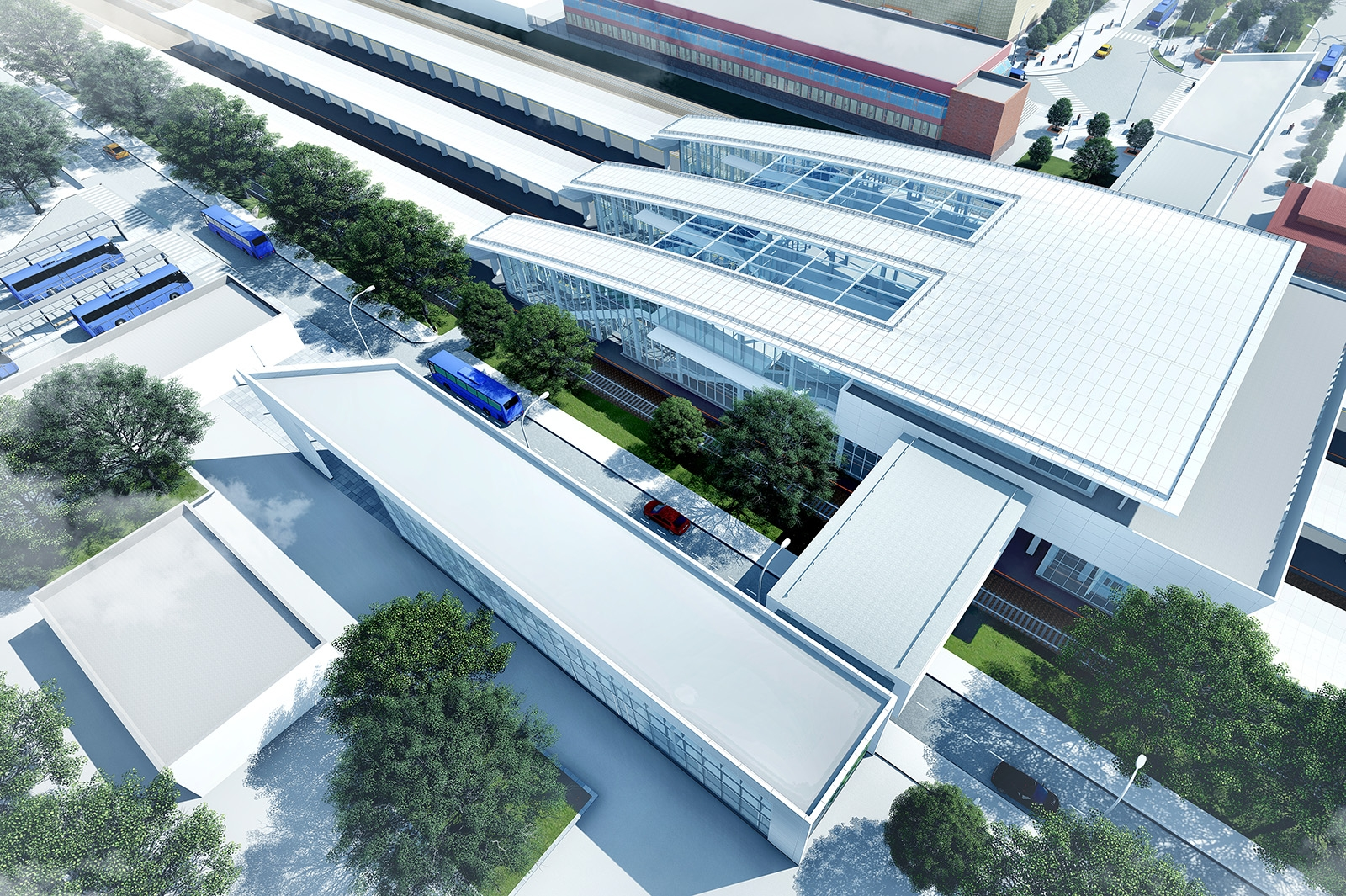

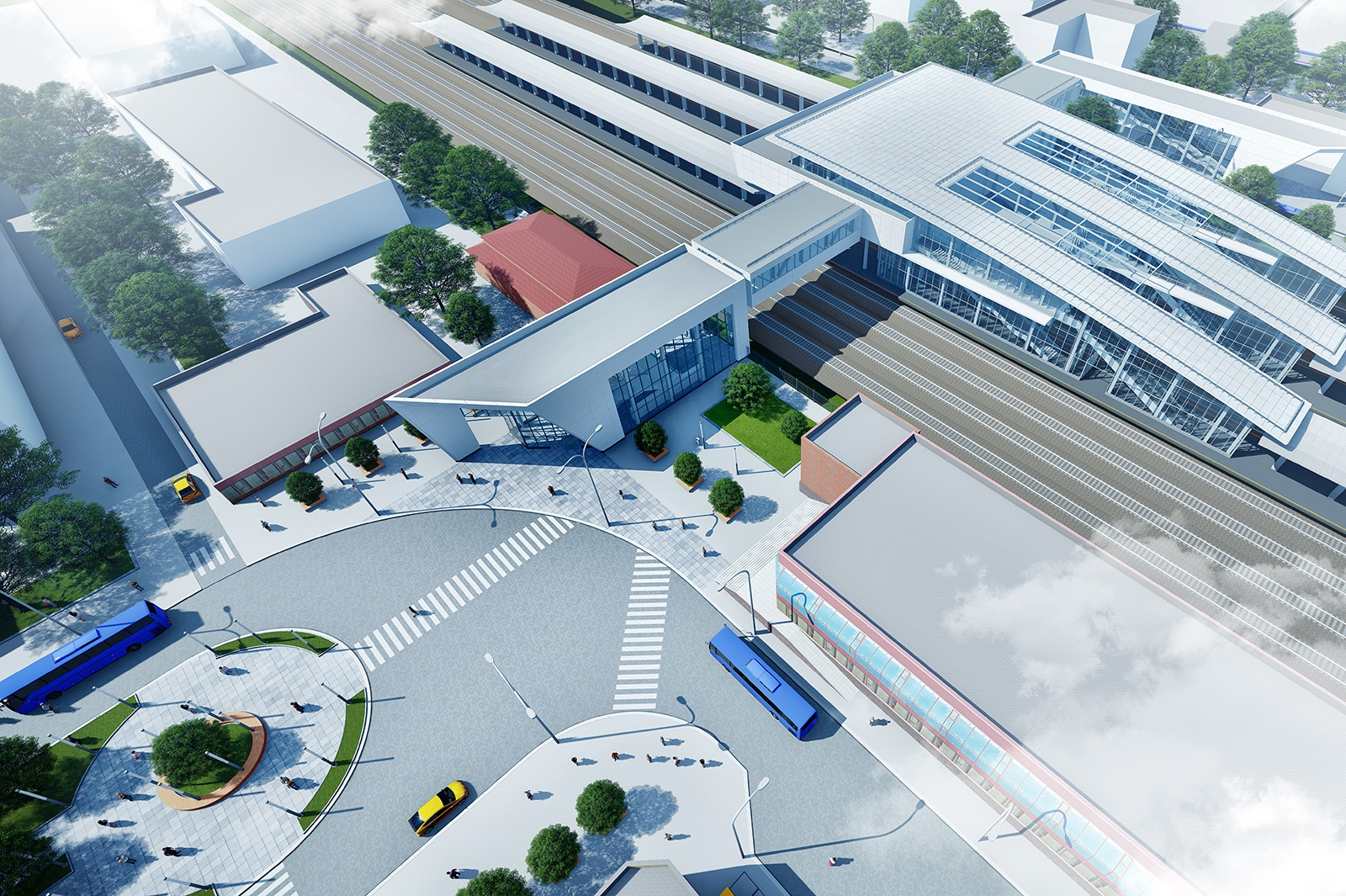

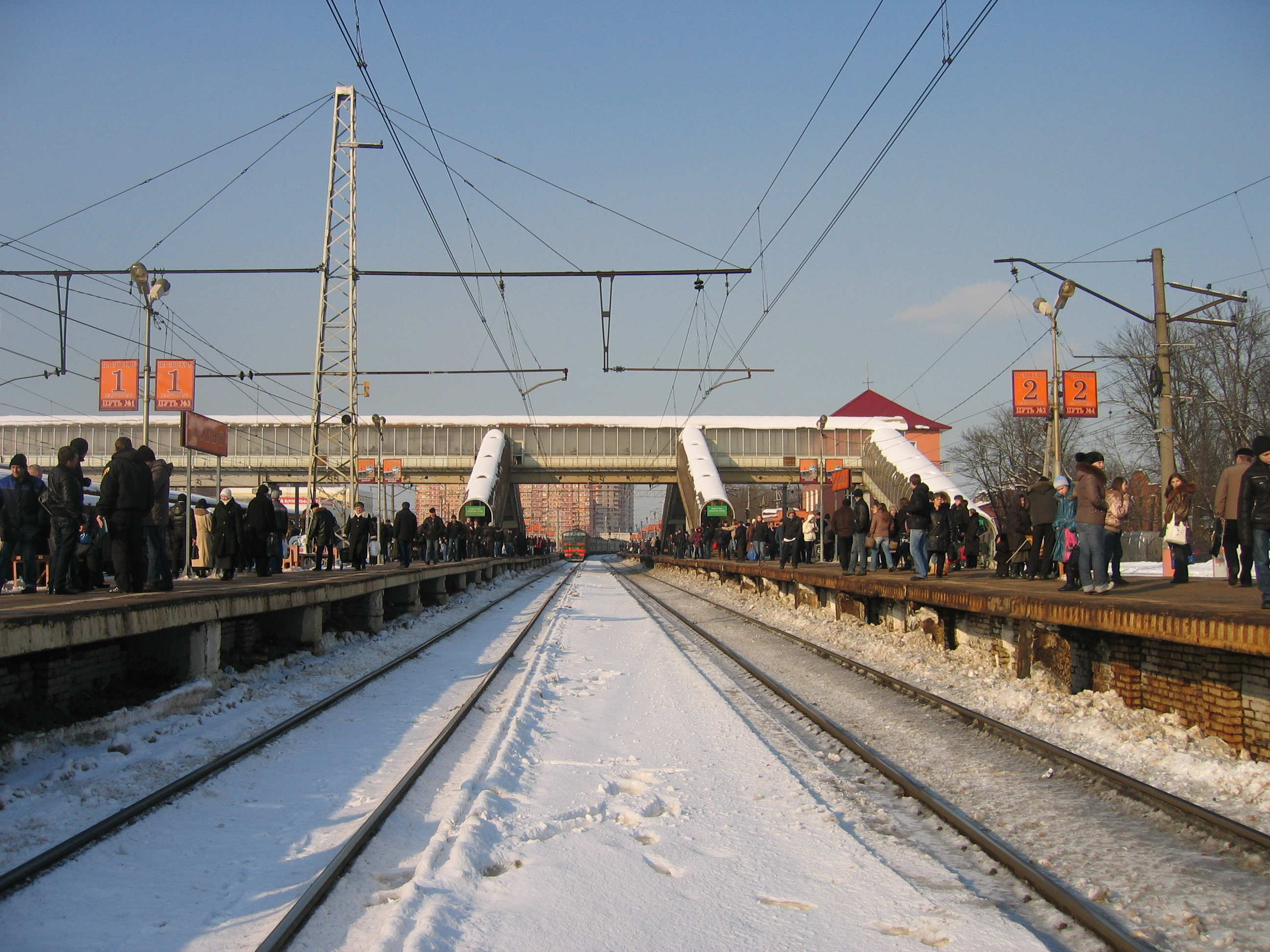
Lobnya railway station before reconstruction (February 2009).
