= Odintsovo railway station =

Railway station in Moscow Oblast, Russia

Odintsovo Одинцово
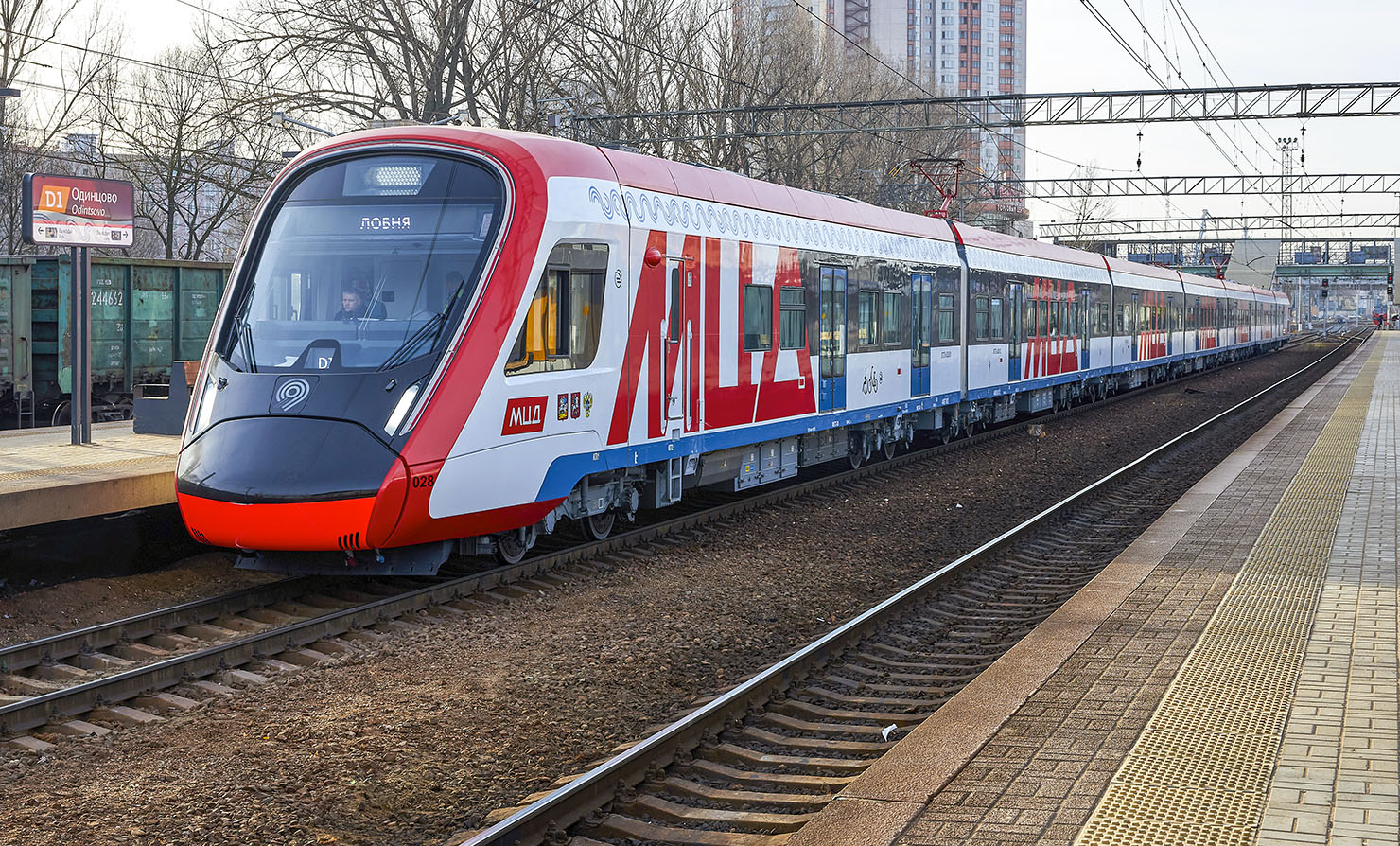

General information
- Location: Odintsovo; Moscow Oblast; Russia
- Coordinates: 55.6721°N 37.2818°E
- System: Moscow Railway platform
- Owner: Russian Railways
- Operator: Moscow Railway
- Platforms: 2
- Tracks: 2

Construction
- Structure type: At-grade
- Accessible: Yes

History
- Opened: 1870

Services
Preceding station	Moscow Central Diameters	Following station
Terminus	Line D1	Bakovka towards Lobnya
Preceding station	Russian Railways	Following station
Otradnoye towards Gagarin	Belorussky Suburban	Bakovka towards Moscow Belorussky
Preceding station	Aeroexpress	Following station
Terminus	Odintsovo to Sheremetyevo Airport	Bakovka towards Aeroport Sheremetyevo
Route map
Location

Odintsovo is a railway station of Line D1 of the Moscow Central Diameters in Odintsovo, Moscow Oblast. It was opened in 1870 and will be rebuilt by 2024.

== Gallery ==
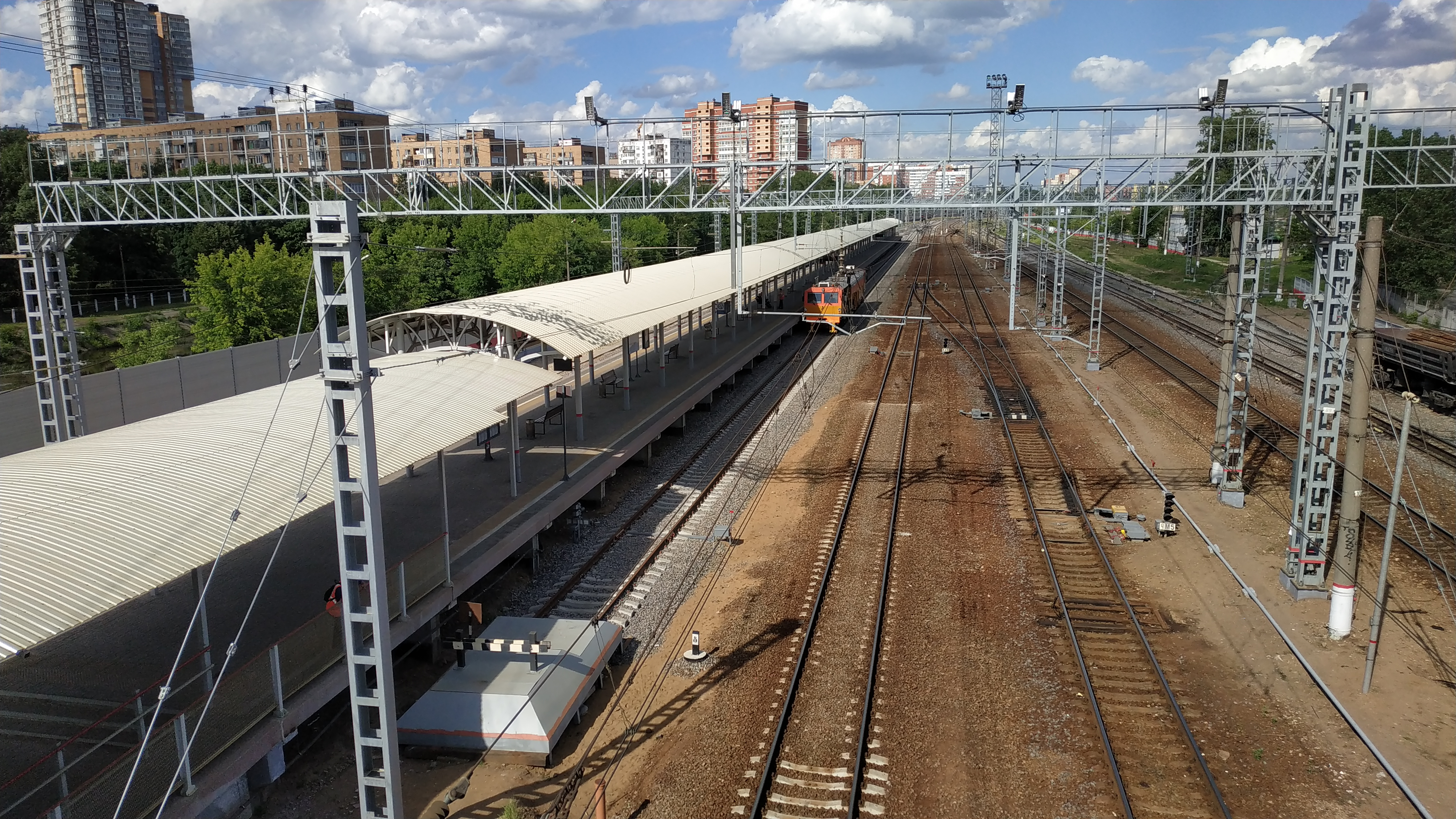

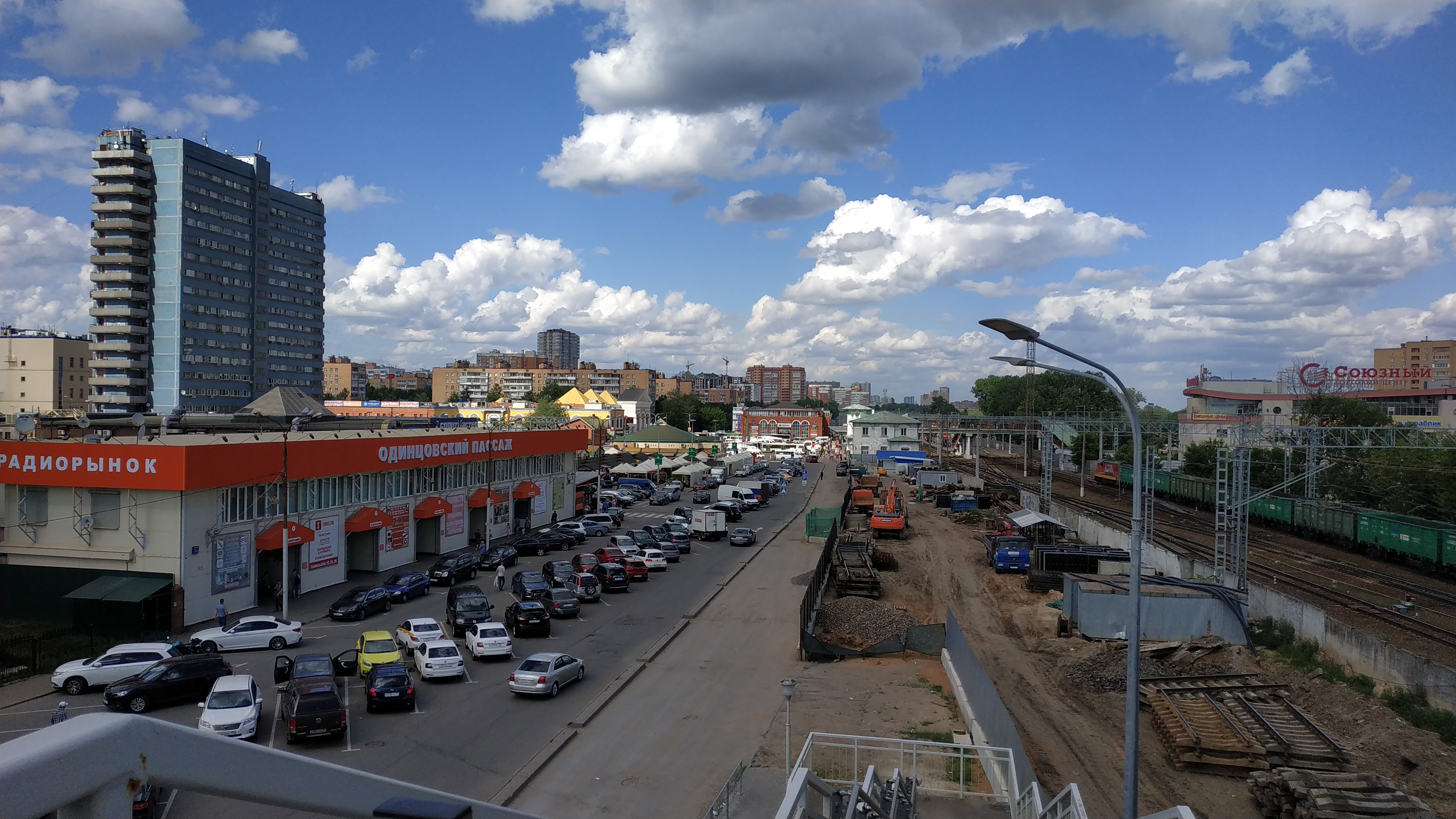
