= List of busiest railway stations in Russia =

This is a list of the busiest railway stations in Russia sorted by the average number of passengers boarding daily in 2019, statistics and data are collected by Russian Railways. Ridership numbers are for Russian Railways only, other rail transport like subway, and stations of Crimea Railway are not included.

== List ==
Train stations with more than 2.5 million passengers per year are shown.

| Rank | Railway station | Passengers (millions per year) | | | City | Photograph |
| Rank | Railway station | Sum | Commuter | Long distance | City | Photograph |
|---|---|---|---|---|---|---|
| 1 | Moscow Yaroslavsky | 78.6 | 71.8 | 6.8 | Moscow | |
| 2 | Moscow Kursky | 71.1 | 58.3 | 12.8 | Moscow | |
| 3 | Moscow Kazansky | 49.9 | 33.5 | 16.4 | Moscow | |
| 4 | Moscow Leningradsky | 39.7 | 27.6 | 12.1 | Moscow | |
| 5 | Moscow Kiyevsky | 29.0 | 25.2 | 3.8 | Moscow | |
| 6 | Moscow Belorussky | 26.9 | 22.7 | 4.2 | Moscow | |
| 7 | Moskovsky | 25.1 | 8.5 | 16.6 | Saint Petersburg | |
| 8 | Moscow Paveletsky | 21.8 | 18.1 | 3.7 | Moscow | |
| 9 | Tsaritsyno | 16.2 | 16.2 | 0.0 | Moscow | |
| 10 | Moscow Savyolovsky | 15.1 | 15.1 | 0.0 | Moscow | |
| 11 | Finland | 13.7 | 13.0 | 0.7 | Saint Petersburg | |
| 12 | Nizhny Novgorod | 13.0 | 8.2 | 4.9 | Nizhny Novgorod | |
| 13 | Baltiysky | 12.8 | 12.1 | 0.7 | Saint Petersburg | |
| 14 | Yekaterinburg | 10.1 | 4.8 | 5.2 | Yekaterinburg | |
| 15 | Vitebsky | 9.8 | 8.6 | 1.2 | Saint Petersburg | |
| 16 | Adler | 6.7 | 2.9 | 3.8 | Sochi | |
| 17 | Samara | 6.5 | 3.5 | 3.0 | Samara | |
| 18 | Tver | 6.0 | 5.2 | 0.8 | Tver | |
| 19 | Ladozhsky | 5.9 | 1.4 | 4.5 | Saint Petersburg | |
| 20 | Rostov-Glavny | 5.6 | 2.1 | 3.5 | Rostov-on-Don | |
| 21 | Krasnodar-1 | 5.5 | 1.1 | 4.4 | Krasnodar | |
| 22 | Sochi | 5.2 | 2.6 | 2.7 | Sochi | |
| 23 | Barnaul | 4.9 | 4.1 | 0.8 | Barnaul | |
| 24 | Perm II | 4.6 | 2.7 | 1.9 | Perm | |
| 25 | Kazan | 4.4 | 1.8 | 2.6 | Kazan | |
| 26 | Tyumen | 4.3 | 0.9 | 3.4 | Tyumen | |
| 27 | Novosibirsk | 4.1 | 0.0 | 4.1 | Novosibirsk | |
| 28 | Saratov-1 | 3.9 | 1.1 | 2.9 | Saratov | |
| 29 | Krasnoyarsk | 3.8 | 1.5 | 2.4 | Krasnoyarsk | |
| 30 | Voronezh-1 | 3.7 | 1.5 | 2.2 | Voronezh | |
| 31 | Kirov | 3.6 | 1.4 | 2.2 | Kirov | |
| 32 | Bryansk-Orlovsky | 3.4 | 1.1 | 2.3 | Bryansk | |
| 33 | Yaroslavl-Glavny | 3.3 | 0.5 | 2.7 | Yaroslavl | |
| 34 | Vladimir | 3.2 | 1.7 | 1.5 | Vladimir | |
| 35 | Volgograd | 3.2 | 1.0 | 2.2 | Volgograd | |
| 36 | Irkutsk | 3.1 | 1.2 | 1.9 | Irkutsk | |
| 37 | Moscow Rizhsky | 3.1 | 2.7 | 0.3 | Moscow | |
| 38 | Vladivostok | 2.8 | 2.0 | 0.8 | Vladivostok | |
| 39 | Ufa | 2.8 | 0.8 | 1.9 | Ufa | |
| 40 | Tula | 2.7 | 1.6 | 1.1 | Tula | |
| 41 | Omsk | 2.7 | 0.0 | 2.7 | Omsk | |
| 42 | Khabarovsk | 2.7 | 0.4 | 2.3 | Khabarovsk | |
| 43 | Anapa | 2.6 | 0.0 | 2.6 | Anapa | |
| 44 | Vyborg | 2.6 | 1.5 | 0.1 | Vyborg | |
| 45 | Dzerzhinsk | 2.6 | 2.2 | 0.4 | Dzerzhinsk | |
