= Yaroslavl railway station =

Railway station in Yaroslavl Oblast, Russia

Yaroslavl Ярославль
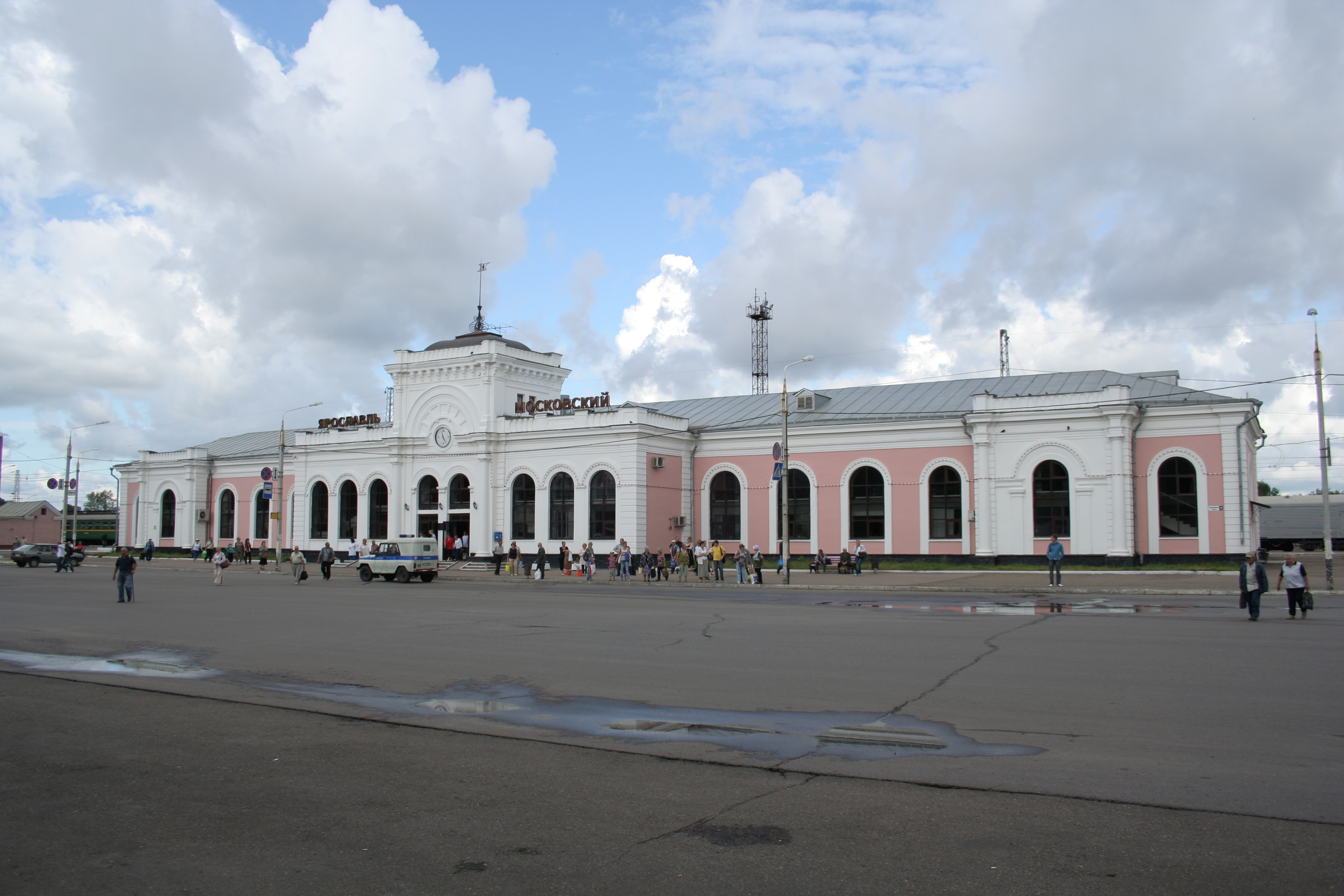
- The terminal of Yaroslavl station

General information
- Location: Podvoyskogo Square, 1, Yaroslavl, Russia
- Coordinates: 57°36′2″N 39°52′20″E
- System: Northern Railway terminal
- Owner: Russian Railways
- Platforms: 2 (1 island platform)
- Tracks: 20

Construction
- Parking: yes

Other information
- Station code: 310109
- Fare zone: 0

History
- Opened: 1870
- Electrified: 1957

Services
Preceding station	Russian Railways	Following station
Rostov-Yaroslavsky towards Moscow Yaroslavsky	Moscow–Vladivostok	Kostroma-Novaya towards Vladivostok
Location

Yaroslavl (Russian: Ярославль), also known as Yaroslavl-Moskovsky (Russian: Ярославль-Московский) is the one of 2 passenger railway stations for the city of Yaroslavl in Russia, and a stop along the Trans-Siberian Railway. Passenger terminal - Moskovsky station, so with respect to the station is also sometimes used the name Yaroslavl-Moskovsky or Yaroslavl-passenger to distinguish it from another major station of the city - Yaroslavl-Glavny.

== History ==
On May 8, 1858 General Directorate of Russian Railways granted permission for the construction of the railroad from Moscow to Troitse-Sergiev Posad for 66 versts and approved the charter of a joint stock company called Moscow-Yaroslavl Railway Company, headed by Savva Ivanovich Mamontov. In 1862 the Moscow-Troitskaya railroad was put into operation. In 1866-1868 is being discussed the construction of the railroad from Sergiev Posad to Yaroslavl. In 1868 the construction work began.

At the same time began construction of the Moscow railway station at the railway station "Yaroslavl" near Moscow outpost. By January 1, 1870 the construction of the road and the building of the station were finished. The first train from Moscow came to the station on February 7, 1870.

From the Yaroslavl station was laid a line to the Volga wharves, the so-called "Vetka". The line started on the territory of the present freight yard, ran along the present Frunze avenue and further along the existing line "Yaroslavl-Yaroslavl-Dock".

After the opening of the Moscow-Yaroslavl railroad Savva Mamontov decided to prolong the railway line from Yaroslavl to Kostroma. On December 17, 1887 grand opening of the Yaroslavl-Kostroma line took place. Cargo turnover and passenger flow at Yaroslavl station increased.

Initially trains going from Yaroslavl to Kostroma had to go in reverse approximately to the present boundary of the station in the direction of Moscow. Then trains continued along the line to the right via the territory of modern depot, then along modern Starokostromskaya street to the existing span "Yaroslavl - Dunayka". Subsequently, a line was built with overpasses over the current Moskovskiy Prospekt and Vetka, the current Frunze Prospekt.

After the construction of the railway bridge over the Volga river in 1913 the station "Yaroslavl" and Moskovsky station began to receive trains from Vologda. Before building of the station building at Yaroslavl-Glavny station in 1952 Yaroslavl station was the main station of the city, and its station was one of the main junctions of the Northern Railway.

In 1957, electrification came to the station. At first the runs "Polyanki - Yaroslavl" and "Yaroslavl - Kotorosl" were electrified. Suburban electric trains of Aleksandrov direction (except for the first electric train to Aleksandrov and the last one from Aleksandrov) came to Yaroslavl station and changed the direction there. In 1971 the section "Yaroslavl - Toshikha" was electrified and electric trains started running through the station to the Kostroma direction.

In 2003 the station was reconstructed with the preservation of the former facade and interiors.
