= Kirov railway station =

Railway station in Kirov, Russia

Kirov Киров
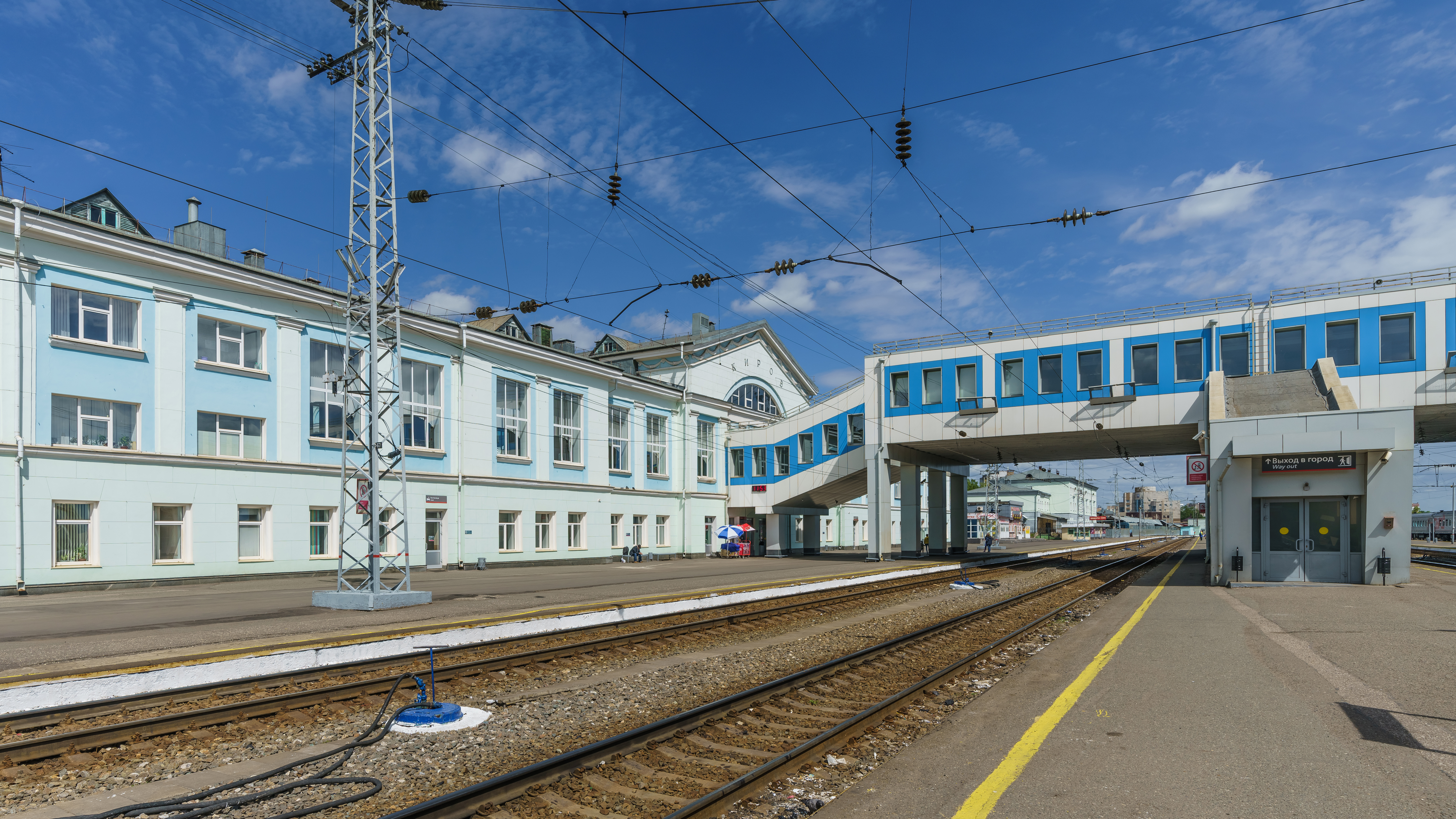
- Kirov railway station

General information
- Location: Russia, Kirov
- Coordinates: 58°34′42.4″N 49°39′05.4″E
- Owner: Russian Railways
- Platforms: 5
- Tracks: 41

Other information
- Station code: 270202
- Fare zone: 0

History
- Opened: 1899

Services
Preceding station	Russian Railways	Following station
Chukhlominskiy towards Moscow Yaroslavsky	Moscow–Vladivostok	Pozdino towards Vladivostok
Yaroslavl-Glavny towards Moscow Yaroslavsky	Moscow–Vladivostok Major stations	Perm towards Vladivostok
Location

Kirov Railway Station is the primary passenger railway station for the city of Kirov in Russia and an important stop along the Trans-Siberian Railway.

== Trains ==
=== Major domestic routes ===
- Moscow — Vladivostok
- Moscow — Beijing
- Moscow — Ulaanbaatar
- Moscow — Perm
- Moscow — Novy Urengoy
- Moscow — Khabarovsk
- Novosibirsk — Minsk
- Moscow — Ulan Ude
- Kirov — Saint Petersburg
- Adler — Vorkuta

=== International routes ===
Train number	Train name	Destination	Operated by
001М/002Щ	Rossiya; Россия	(Russia) Moscow (Yaroslavsky) (Russia) Vladivostok (cars: (North Korea) Pyongyang, (North Korea) Tumangang)	(Russia) Russian Railways
003З/004З		(Russia) Moscow (Yaroslavsky) (China) Beijing (Main); Runs through Mongolia	China Railway
005Щ/006Щ		(Russia) Moscow (Yaroslavsky) (Mongolia) Ulaanbaatar (cars: (Mongolia) Erdenet)	(Russia) Russian Railways (Mongolia) Ulaanbataar Railway
019Ч/020Щ	Vostok; Восток	(Russia) Moscow (Yaroslavsky) (China) Beijing (Main)	(Russia) Russian Railways
063Б/064Б		(Belarus) Minsk (cars: (Belarus) Brest) (Russia) Novosibirsk	(Belarus) Belarusian Railways
