= Ugolnaya railway station =

Railway station in Primorsky Krai, Russia

Ugolnaya Угольная
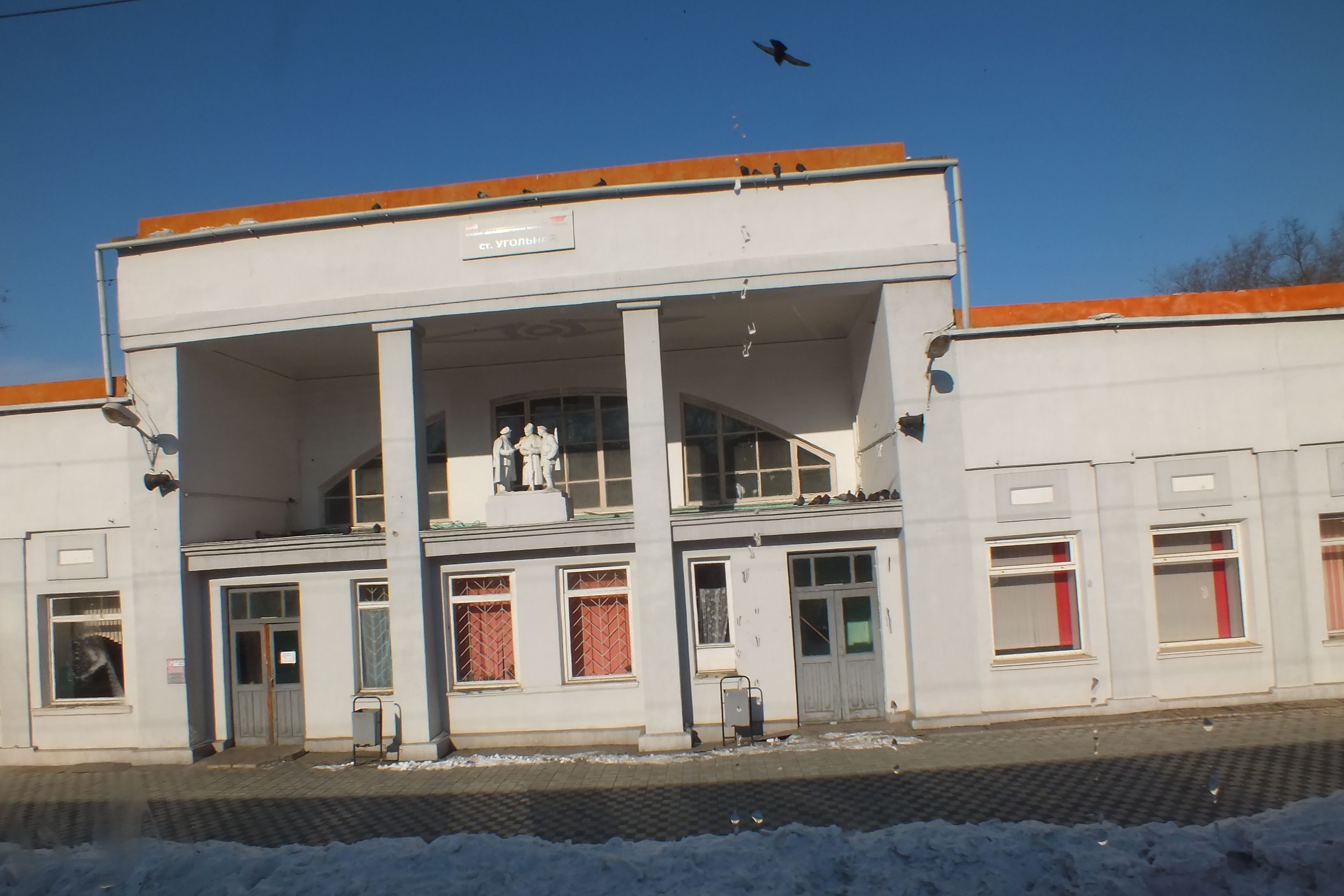
- Ugolnaya railway station

General information
- Location: Trudovoye, Primorsky Krai
- Coordinates: 43°15′45.1″N 132°2′27.4″E
- Owner: Russian Railways
- Operator: Far Eastern Railway
- Platforms: 2
- Tracks: 20

Other information
- Station code: 982102
- Fare zone: 0

History
- Opened: 1893

Services
Preceding station	Russian Railways	Following station
Nadezdinskaya towards Moscow Yaroslavsky	Moscow–Vladivostok	Vladivostok Terminus
Knevichi Terminus	Express Primorya	Vladivostok Terminus
Route map
Location

Ugolnaya railway station is a Russian railway station and railway junction in a valley in the north of the Muravyov-Amursky Peninsula.

== Trains ==
- Moscow — Vladivostok
- Khabarovsk — Vladivostok
- Novosibirsk — Vladivostok
- Novokuznetsk — Vladivostok
- Sovetskaya Gavan — Vladivostok
- Knevichi — Vladivostok (Aeroexpress)
