= Rostov Veliky railway station =

Railway station

Rostov Veliky Ростов Великий
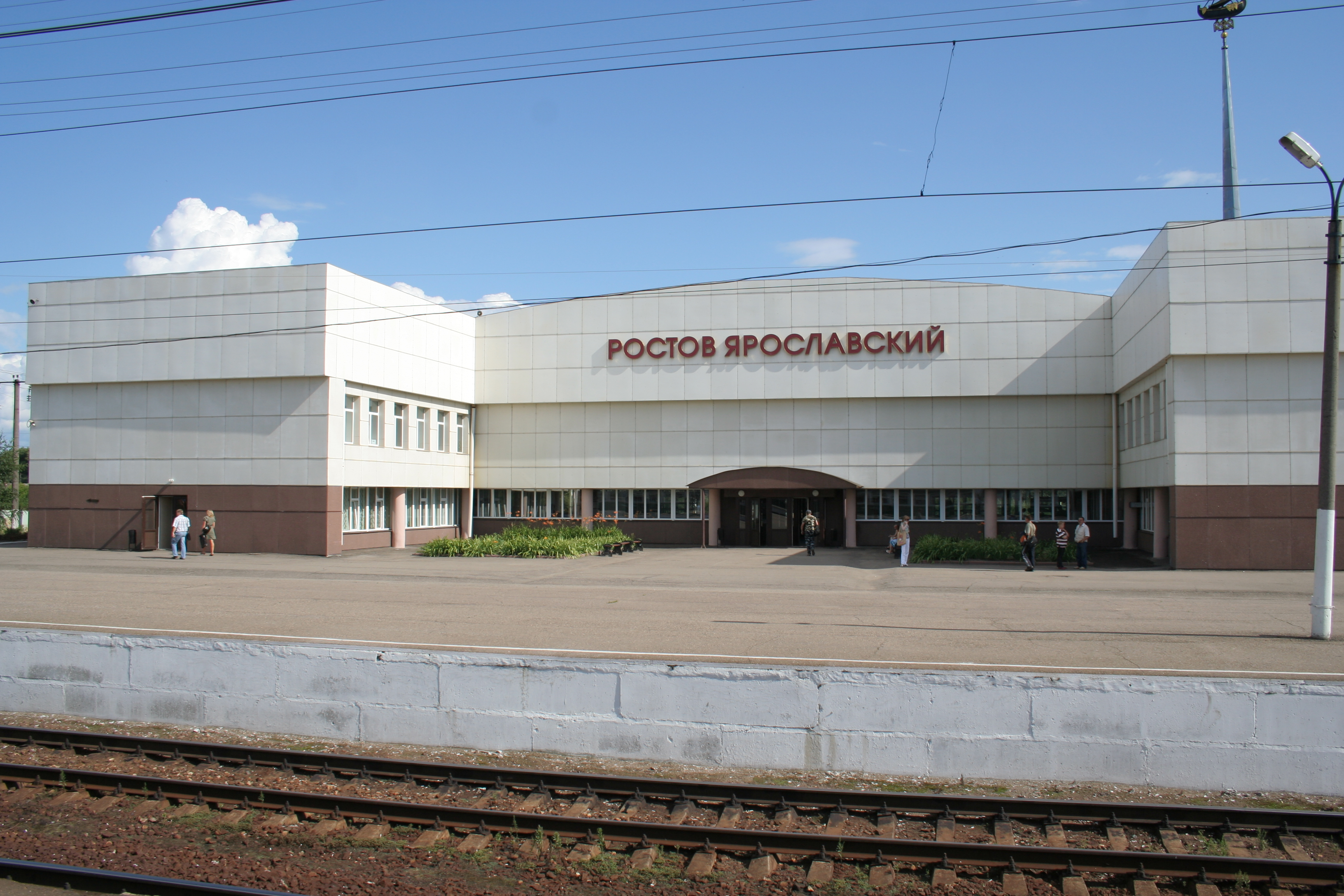
- View of the station from the railway platform.

General information
- Location: Dostoevskogo St., 1, Rostov Veliky, Russia
- Coordinates: 57°11′53″N 39°24′26″E
- System: Northern Railway terminal
- Owner: Russian Railways
- Operator: Northern Railway
- Platforms: 2 (1 island platform)
- Tracks: 8

Construction
- Parking: yes
- Cycle facilities: yes

Other information
- Station code: 314307
- Fare zone: 0

History
- Opened: 1870
- Rebuilt: 1975, 2000th
- Electrified: 1958
- Former names: Rostov (until 1904)

Services
Preceding station	Russian Railways	Following station
Alexandrov towards Moscow Yaroslavsky	Moscow–Vladivostok	Yaroslavl-Glavny towards Vladivostok
Location

Rostov Veliky (until 1904 was known as Rostov and Rostov-Yaroslavsky in 1904–2025) is the passenger railway station in Rostov Veliky (Yaroslavl Oblast, Russia) and a stop along the Trans-Siberian Railway.

== History ==
The station was opened in 1870 on the Alexandrov - Yaroslavl section. The first train from Moscow to Rostov Veliky ran January 1 (13), 1870.

In 1958, during the electrification of the Alexandrov - Yaroslavl-Glavny section, the station was electrified with 3 kV direct current.

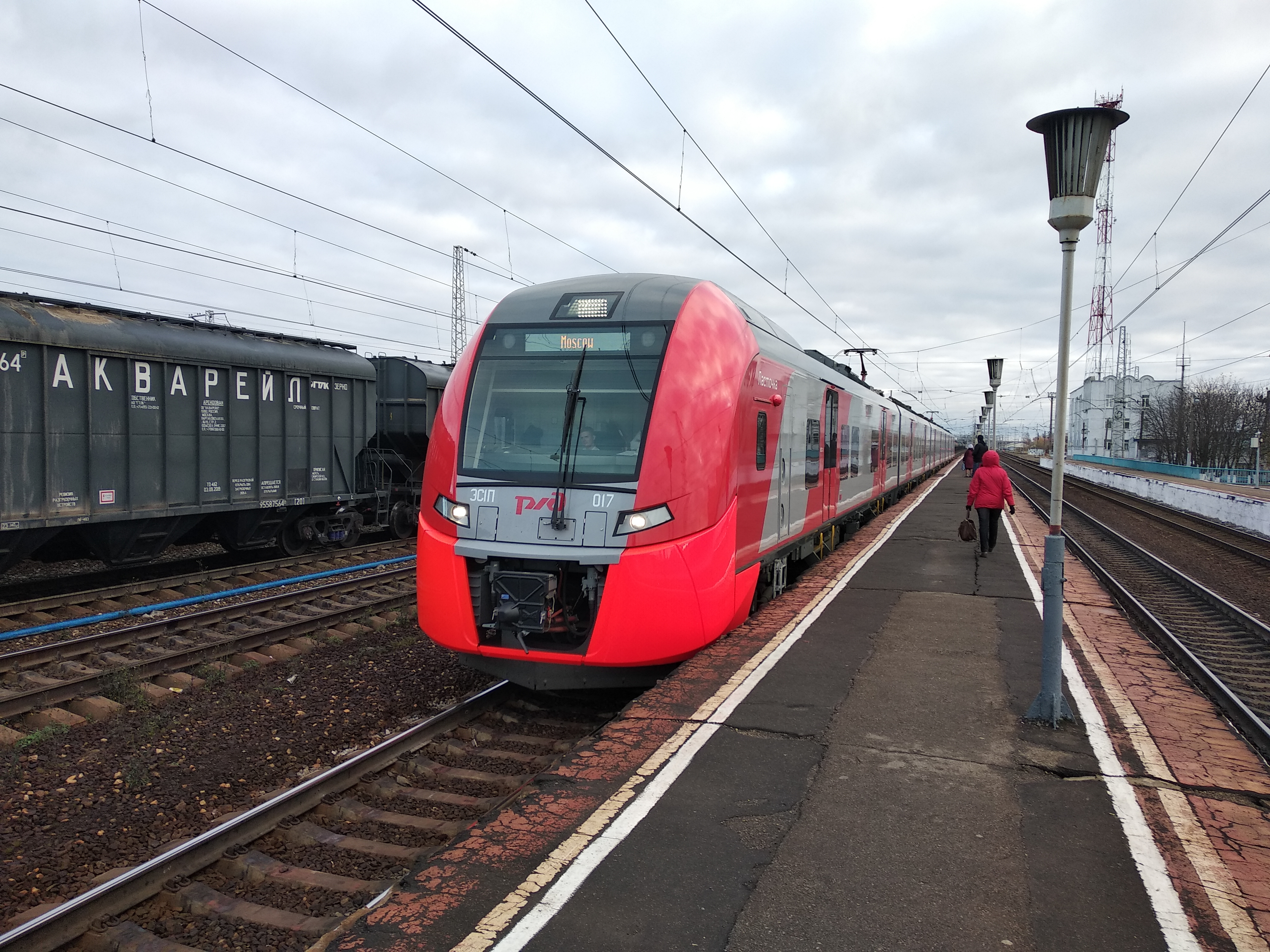
Moscow - Kostroma "Lastochka" train has arrived at Rostov-Yaroslavsky railway station

In October 2020, a high-speed train "Lastochka" running from Moscow to Kostroma began to stop at Rostov-Yaroslavsky station, with the travel time of 2 hour 17 minutes from Moscow.

== Terminal ==
The station's appearance has changed several times over its long history. Old-timers still remember a small wooden structure with a stone central part - a waiting room and two-storey wings connected by a gallery.

The modern building of the station was built in 1975. The townspeople call it a "ship" for its resemblance to a large ocean liner, miraculously moored near the railroad tracks. Above the station towers a spire with a rook, the symbol of the city. The building is U-shaped and has 2 floors. The average height of the main premises is 3.35 m, the height of the lobby and hall is 8 m. The total area of the building by internal measurement is 1881.8 m^{2}.

== Activities ==
The station is open for cargo operations.

Commercial operations performed at the station:

- sale of passenger tickets
- acceptance and delivery of luggage
- acceptance and delivery of wagonload consignments of cargo (open platforms)
- receipt and delivery of small consignments of goods (covered warehouses)
- receipt and delivery of wagonload and small consignments of cargo (sidings)
- receipt and delivery of wagonload consignments of cargo (covered warehouses)
- receipt and delivery of cargo in general-purpose containers (3 and 5 tons)
- reception and dispatch of cargo in general-purpose containers (20 tons)
- reception and delivery of small consignments (open yards)
