= Yaroslavl-Glavny railway station =

Railway station in Yaroslavl, Russia

Yaroslavl–Glavny Ярославль–Главный
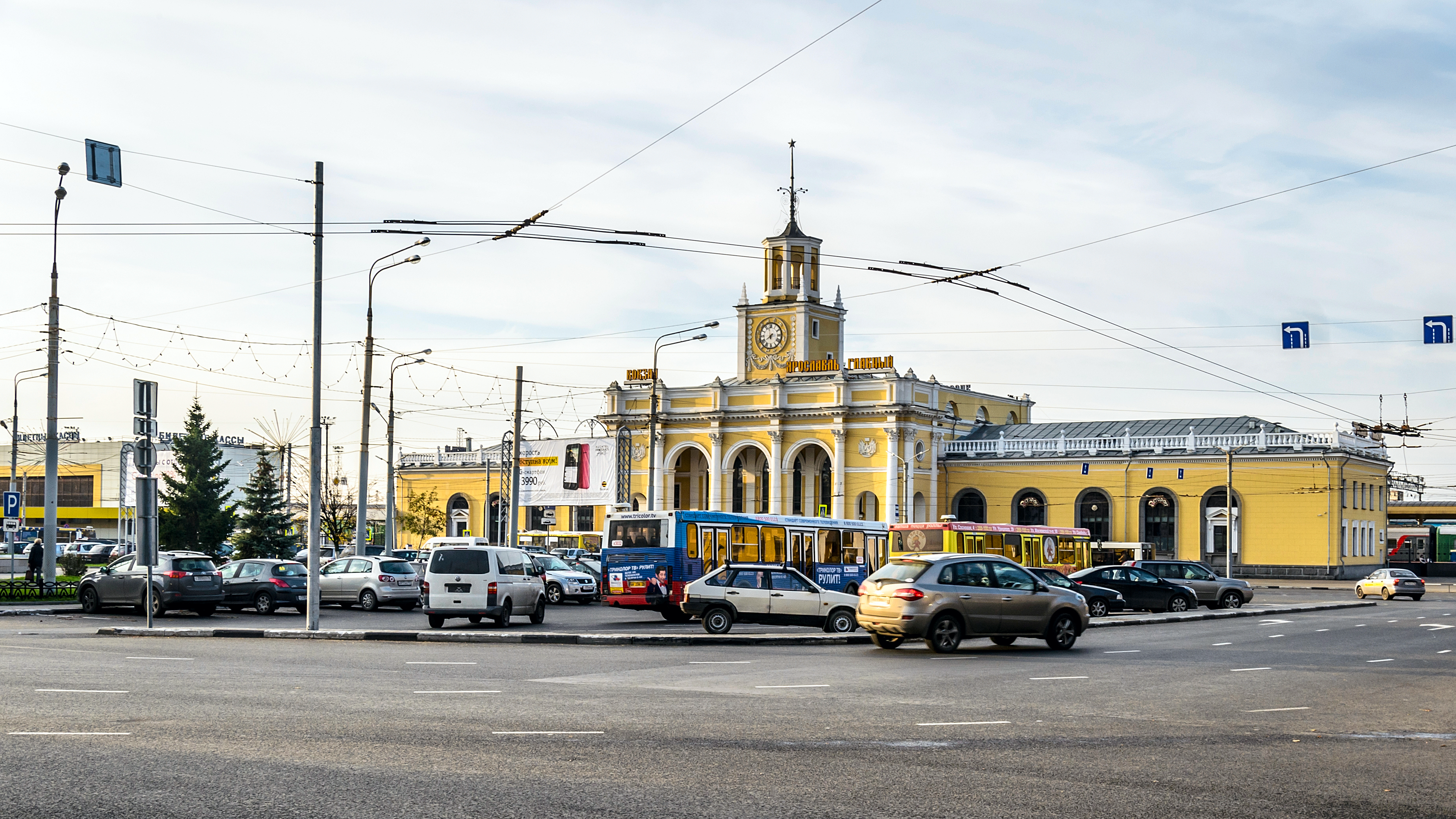
- View of the station from the street.

General information
- Location: Yaroslavl Glavny Square, 1, Yaroslavl, Russia
- Coordinates: 57°37′32.1″N 39°50′7″E
- System: Northern Railway terminal
- Owner: Russian Railways
- Platforms: 4 (3 island platforms)
- Tracks: 40

Construction
- Parking: yes

Other information
- Station code: 310005
- Fare zone: 0

History
- Opened: 1898
- Former names: Vspolye (until 1952)

Services
Preceding station	Russian Railways	Following station
Rostov-Yaroslavsky towards Moscow Yaroslavsky	Moscow–Vladivostok	Danilov towards Vladivostok
Location

Yaroslavl–Glavny is the primary passenger railway station for the city of Yaroslavl in Russia, and an important stop along the Trans-Siberian Railway. Until 1952, the station was known as Vspolye.

On August 6, 2017, a new high-speed train "Chaika" was launched on the Yaroslavl–Rybinsk route, with the travel time of 1 hour and 15 minutes.

On October 10, 2018, the director of the Department of Protection of Cultural Heritage Objects of the Yaroslavl Region signed an order adding the Yaroslavl-Glavny Railway Station building built in 1952 to the list of cultural heritage sites.

== History ==
The first railroad in Yaroslavl was built in 1870, connecting Sergiyev Posad with Yaroslavl. Permission for its construction was issued in 1868, and the traffic was opened on February 18, 1870. The main station at the time was the station, now known as Yaroslavl-Moskovsky.

Then urban developments slowly spread from the main highway to the north and east, in the direction of Vologda, Kostroma, and Rybinsk. Thus, the Yaroslavl-Ribinsk road began to be built in 1898 and was completed in 1902. By that time the Yaroslavl railroad had been working for about forty years. The railway belonged to the Moscow-Yaroslavl Railway Joint-Stock Company. At the end of XIX century the board of the society was headed by S.I.Mamontov.

In 1898 Vspolye station was built - a one-story wooden building, later adapted as a building of the station attendant, the name is still in use in the city. The station got its name from the historical name of the area Vspolye, where it was built. After the railway bridge over the Volga was built in 1913 the older Yaroslavl-Moscow station was not on the main transportation routes through Yaroslavl. Therefore, Vspolye station gradually grew to the main station in Yaroslavl.

During the war Vspolye station was crucial for the whole North-Western direction. It was a distributing station of the Kalinin, Western and North-Western fronts. From here were sent trains carrying necessary cargo for the soldiers defending Moscow and Leningrad, here were taken the inhabitants of besieged Leningrad. This stage in the history of the station is depicted in the novel "The Two Captains".

In 1952 was built a new passenger building (architect V. Panchenko) and the station was renamed Yaroslavl-Main Station. The building of the station with a clock tower decorated with the signs of the zodiac, an example of the so-called Stalin Empire, in 1955 was criticized in the decree against architectural excesses. According to the volume of passenger traffic, luggage handling, as well as the available passenger facilities, the station is classified as an out-of-class station. The single capacity of the station: 1,500 long-distance and local passengers and 300 suburban passengers.

In 1977 he built a building of ticket offices and an underground passage.

In 2008 a monument to Savva Mamontov was installed near the station, his name is closely associated with the history of the Northern Railway.

In July 2010 - May 2011 platform number 2 was reconstructed. A covered high platform was erected in place of the existing low platform. In comparison with existing high platforms No. 1 and No. 3, the platform No. 2 is a little shorter and is designed primarily for suburban traffic. Canopy with mounted lamps is installed over the most part of the platform. The opening of the platform took place at the end of May 2011. Due to the fact that the platform No. 2 was taken out of service during reconstruction, the temporary low platform No. 5 was used during the construction on the dedicated track No. 7.

On May 30, 2013, the station experienced flooding of the station square and the pedestrian underpass due to heavy prolonged heavy rainfall[5].

On August 6, 2017, a new fast train "Chaika" on the route Yaroslavl - Rybinsk was launched. The distance between Yaroslavl and Rybinsk high-speed train covers in 1 hour 15 minutes.[6]

On October 10, 2018, the director of the Department of protection of cultural heritage of the Yaroslavl region signed an order on the inclusion of the "Yaroslavl-Glavny Railway Station" built in 1952 in the list of identified objects of cultural heritage.[7]

Since late 2021, the platform No.3 was taken out of service due to reconstruction.

== Gallery ==
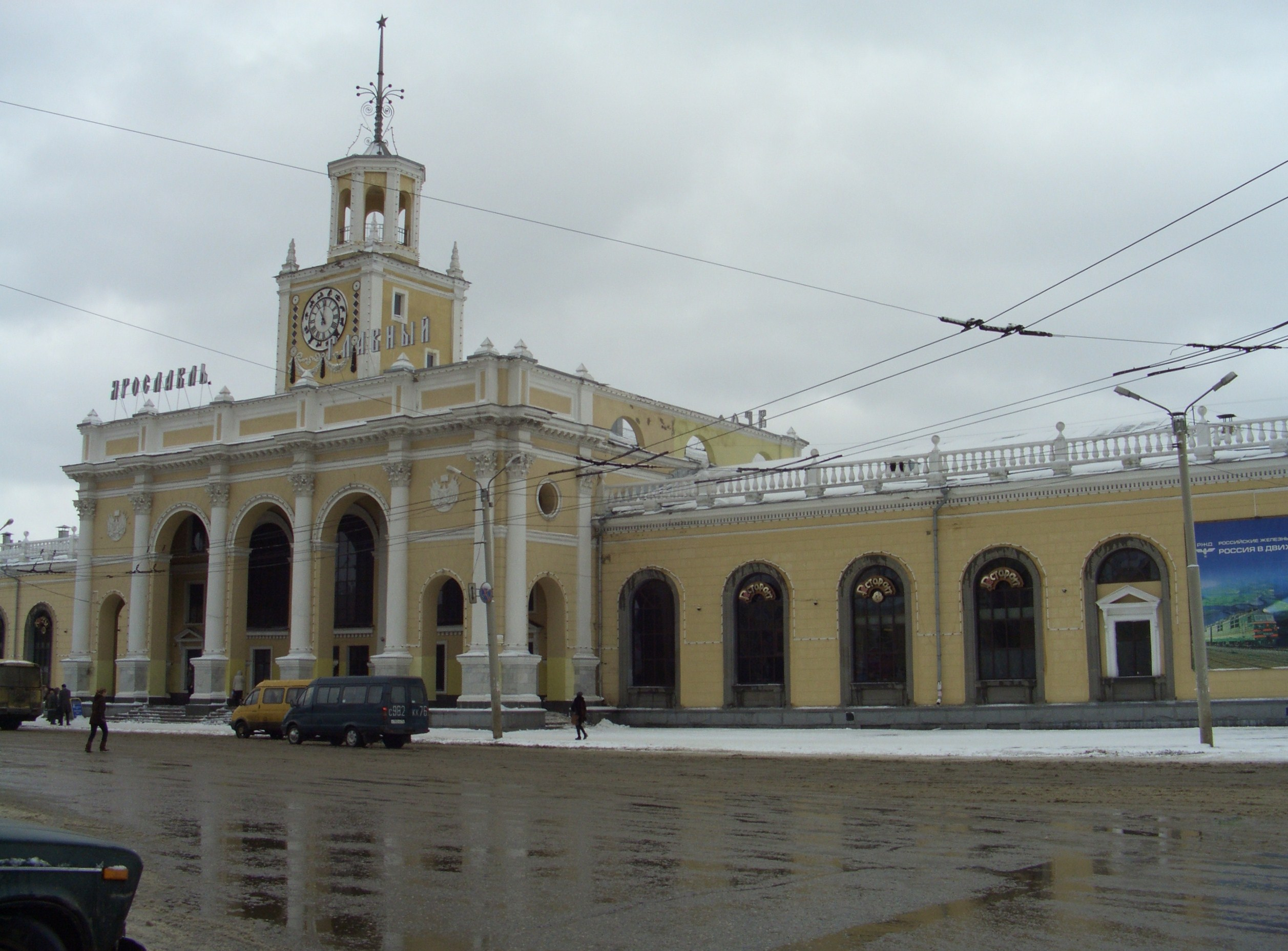
Yaroslavl-Glavny railway station

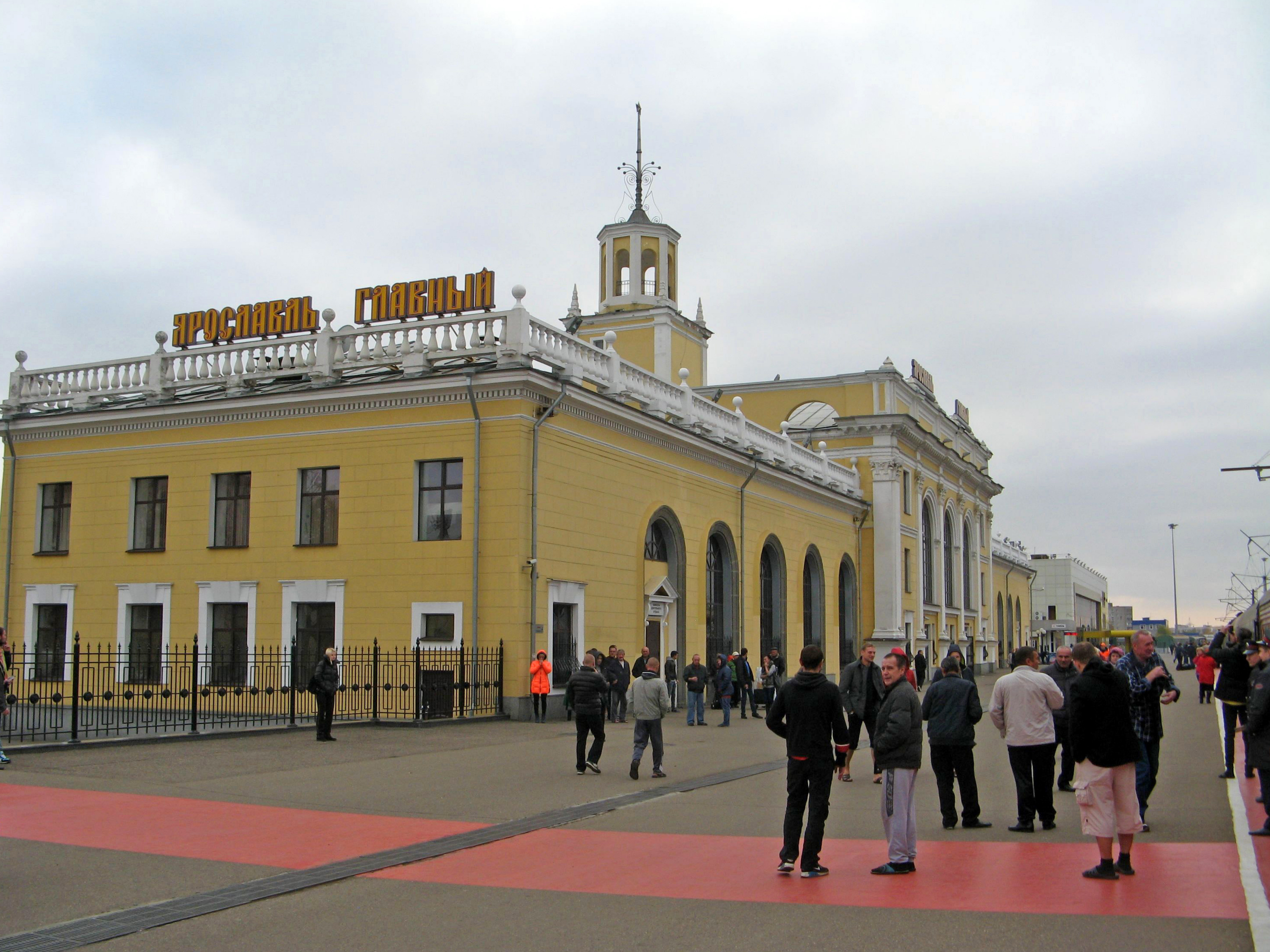
Yaroslavl-Glavny railway station
