= Knevichi railway station =

Railway station in Artyom, Russia

Knevichi Airport Аэропорт Кневичи
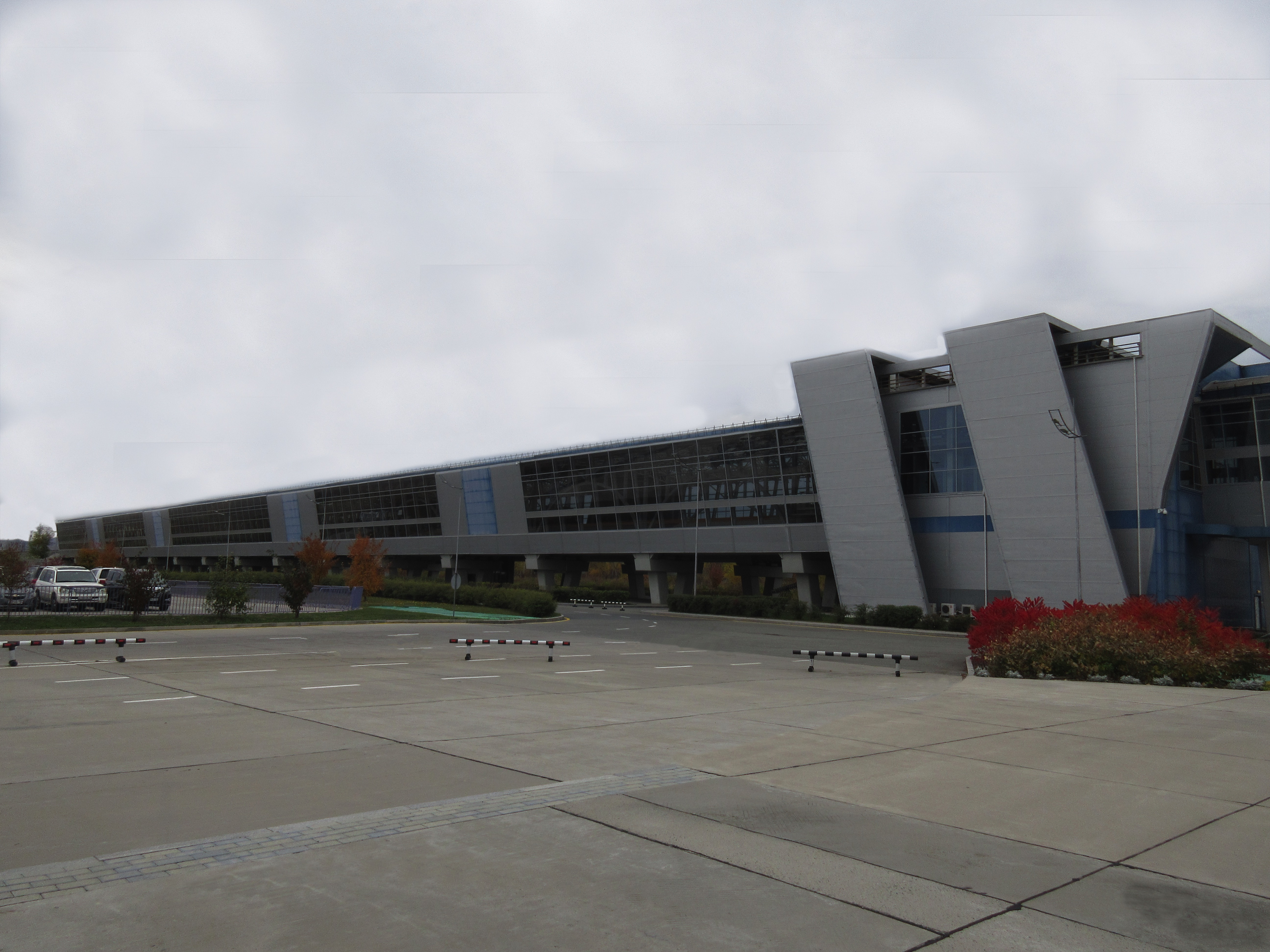
- Knevichi railway station

General information
- Location: Vladimira Saybelya St, 41, Artyom, Primorsky Krai; Russia
- Coordinates: 43°23′41.7″N 132°9′50.4″E
- Owner: Russian Railways
- Operator: Far Eastern Railway
- Platforms: 1
- Tracks: 2

Other information
- Station code: 982167
- Fare zone: 0

History
- Opened: 2012

Services
Preceding station	Russian Railways	Following station
Terminus	Express Primorya	Ugolnaya towards Vladivostok
Location

Knevichi railway station is a railway station in Artyom, Russia. The station building is directly connected to Vladivostok International Airport.

== Trains ==
Only Aeroexpress departs from this station, connecting with Vladivostok Railway Station in 54 minutes. However, Aeroexpress only operates five trains per day.
