= Novki =

Novki Новки
- Village
- Location within Vladimir Oblast Location within Russia
- Coordinates: 56°22′N 41°05′E
- Country: Russia
- Region: Vladimir Oblast
- District: Kameshkovsky District
- Time zone: UTC+3:00

Novki (Russian: Новки) is a rural locality (a village) in Bryzgalovskoye Rural Settlement, Kameshkovsky District, Vladimir Oblast, Russia. The population was 58 as of 2010.

== Geography ==
Novki is located 8 km northeast of Kameshkovo (the district's administrative centre) by road. Vereshchagino is the nearest rural locality.
