= Northern Railway (Russia) =

Railway connecting Moscow and Arkhangelsk, Russia

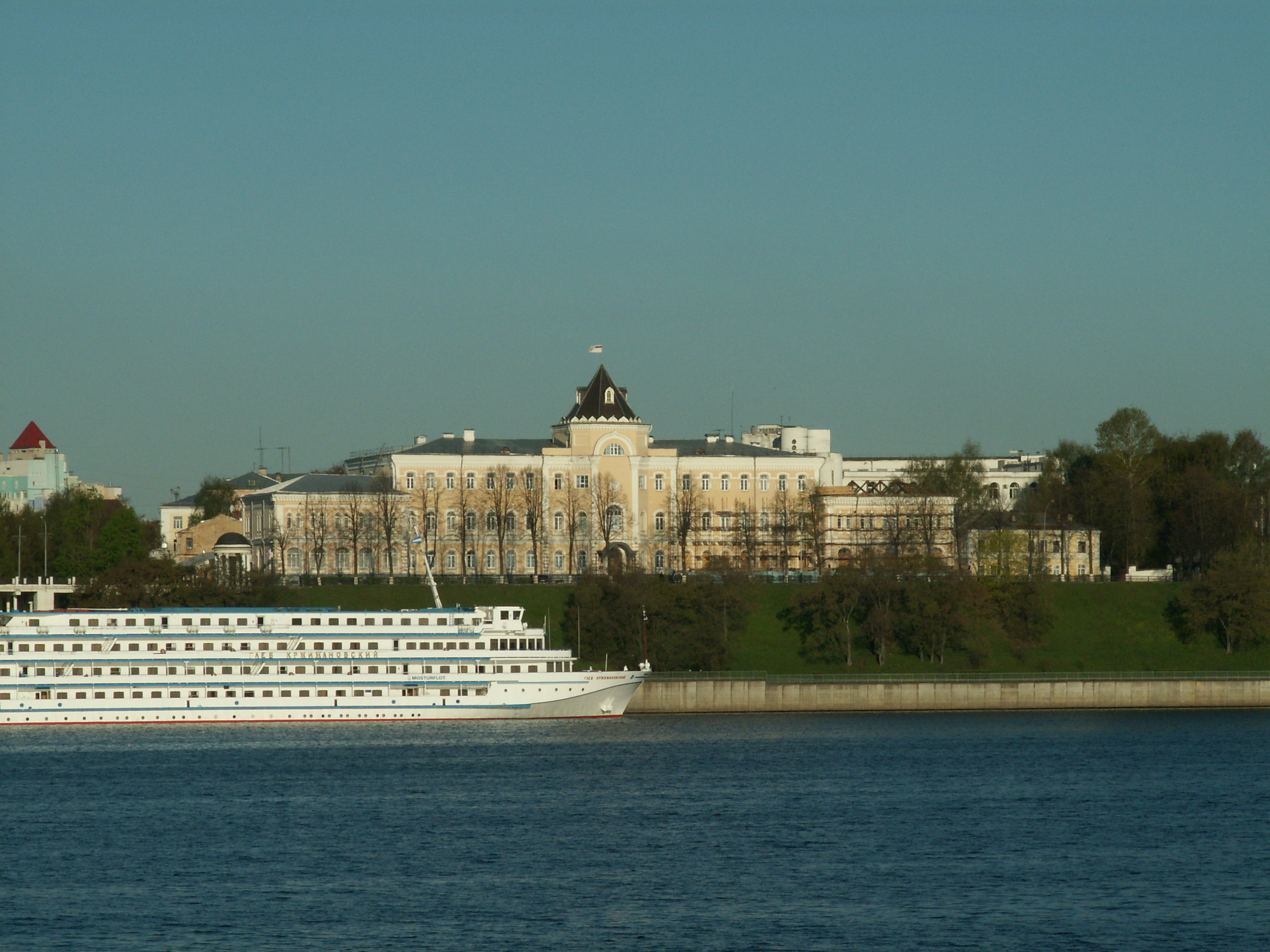
The main office of the railway overlooking the Volga River in Yaroslavl

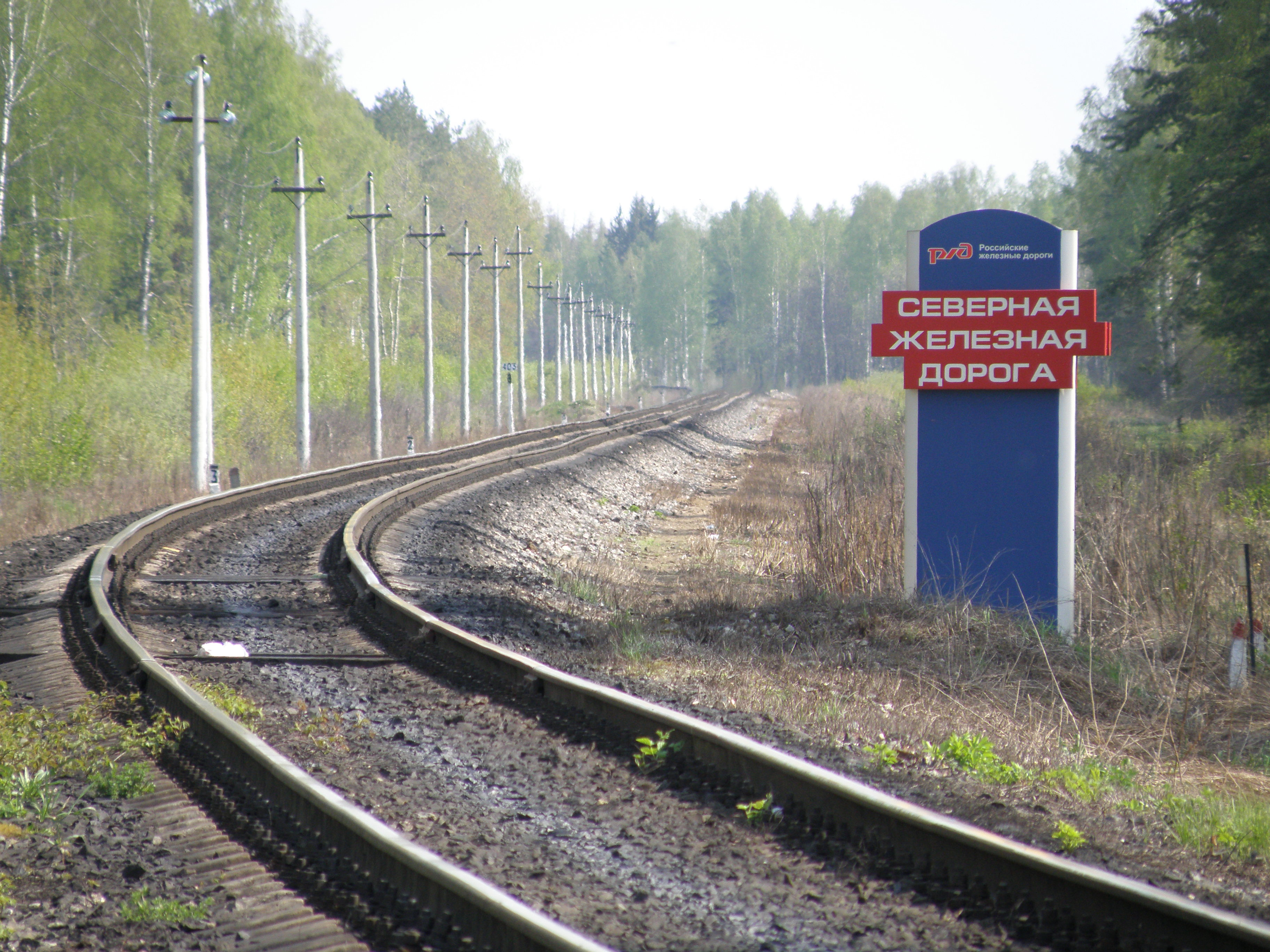
The border sign of the railway near Novki

The Severnaya Railway (Северная железная дорога; "Northern Railway") is a railway network linking Moscow with Arkhangelsk on the coast of the Arctic Ocean. It runs through Arkhangelsk, Komi, Vologda, Kostroma, Yaroslavl, Ivanovo, and Vladimir regions of the Russian Federation.

Northern Railway counts its age from 15 September 1868 when its first part, Shuya-Ivanovo Railway connecting Ivanovo, Shuya and Novki, was opened.

The Yaroslavl Railway, owned by Savva Mamontov, was one of the first railways in Russia. The Alexandrov–Yaroslavl–Vologda line was opened in 1872. There are several monuments to Savva Mamontov along the road. The original Moscow–Yaroslavl Mainline is no longer operated from Yaroslavl; it was transferred to the Moscow Railway in 1959.

== Yaroslavl-Vologda-Arkhangelsk line ==
In 1894, the construction of the railway connecting Vologda with Arkhangelsk started. The decision was taken to construct the line along the shortest route, which at the time ran through a sparsely populated area, and not along one of the existing trading routes, via Kargopol or Verkhovazhye. The construction was completed in 1897. Line Yaroslavl - Vologda - Arkhangelsk was built with 1,067 mm (3 ft 6 in) gauge. Terminal station in Yaroslavl was located on opposite bank of Volga River.

Yaroslavl railway junction map for 1900–1913 with narrow gauge line to Arkhangelsk

Yaroslavl railway junction map

In 1913, a railway bridge in Yaroslavl was built, line Yaroslavl - Vologda regauged to 1,524 mm (5 ft). Vologda - Arkhangelsk line regauged to 1,524 mm (5 ft) in 1914–1918.

The Cherepovets–Vologda–Vyatka(Kirov) line has been in operation since 1906. It is a link joining the Northern Railway to the Perm Railway further to the east. They form the original, or northern, route of the great Trans-Siberian Railway. A long railway to the mining town of Vorkuta, known as the Pechora Mainline, was constructed by Gulag labor between 1937 and 1941. Its headquarters were in Kotlas.

== Yaroslavl-Kostroma line ==
Kostroma railway junction bap before 1920s

The Yaroslavl - Kostroma line opened in 1887. The first Kostroma terminal located in far bank of the Volga.

Kostroma railway junction map

In 1932 the line was re-routed over a new bridge closer to the city. In 1956 this line was extended northbound from Kostroma to Galich, and created a spare line for Transsib route.

Nowadays the Northern Railway is a subsidiary of the Russian Railways. Its total length is 5956 km. The headquarters are on the Volga Embankment in Yaroslavl. Its branches are based in Yaroslavl, Vologda, Arkhangelsk, Solvychegodsk, and Sosnogorsk.
