= Voronezh-1 railway station =

Railway station in Voronezh, Russia

Voronezh-1 Воронеж-1
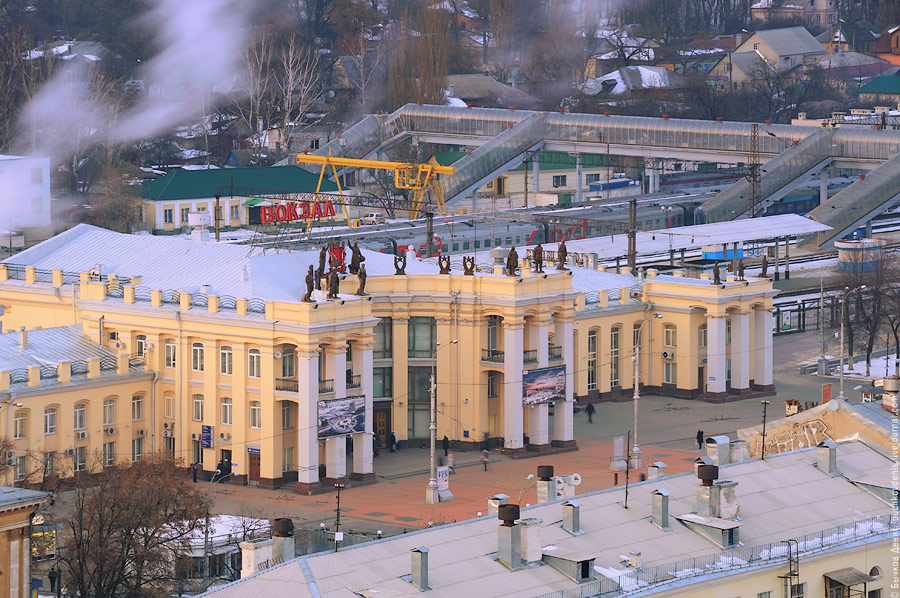

General information
- Location: Russia, Voronezh
- Coordinates: 51°40′47″N 39°12′13″E
- System: South Eastern Railway terminal
- Owner: Russian Railways
- Platforms: 3

Other information
- Station code: 596506
- Fare zone: 0

History
- Opened: 1869
- Rebuilt: 1954

Services
Preceding station	South Eastern Railway	Following station
Location

Voronezh-1 (Russian: Воронеж-1) is the main railway station in Voronezh, Voronezh Oblast, Russia. It is a junction station of South Eastern Railway.

== History ==
Since 1868, there is a railway connection between Voronezh and Moscow, the first railway station of Voronezh opened in 1869, the first station building was bombed by German troops during World War II. The current station building was built in 1945.

== Architecture ==
The modern building of the station was built in 1954 by the project of the Moscow architect Skarzhinsky under the leadership of a full member of the USSR Academy of Architecture. The building is located parallel to the platforms and is a two-story structure, in the center of which there is an elevated part with the main lobby. In the direction of the paths, it is framed by a large glazed arch, in the center of which is a large glass stained-glass window, and in the direction of the square - a horseshoe-shaped protrusion of the facade.
