= Aeroexpress =

Operator of airport rail link services in Russia

Aeroekspress
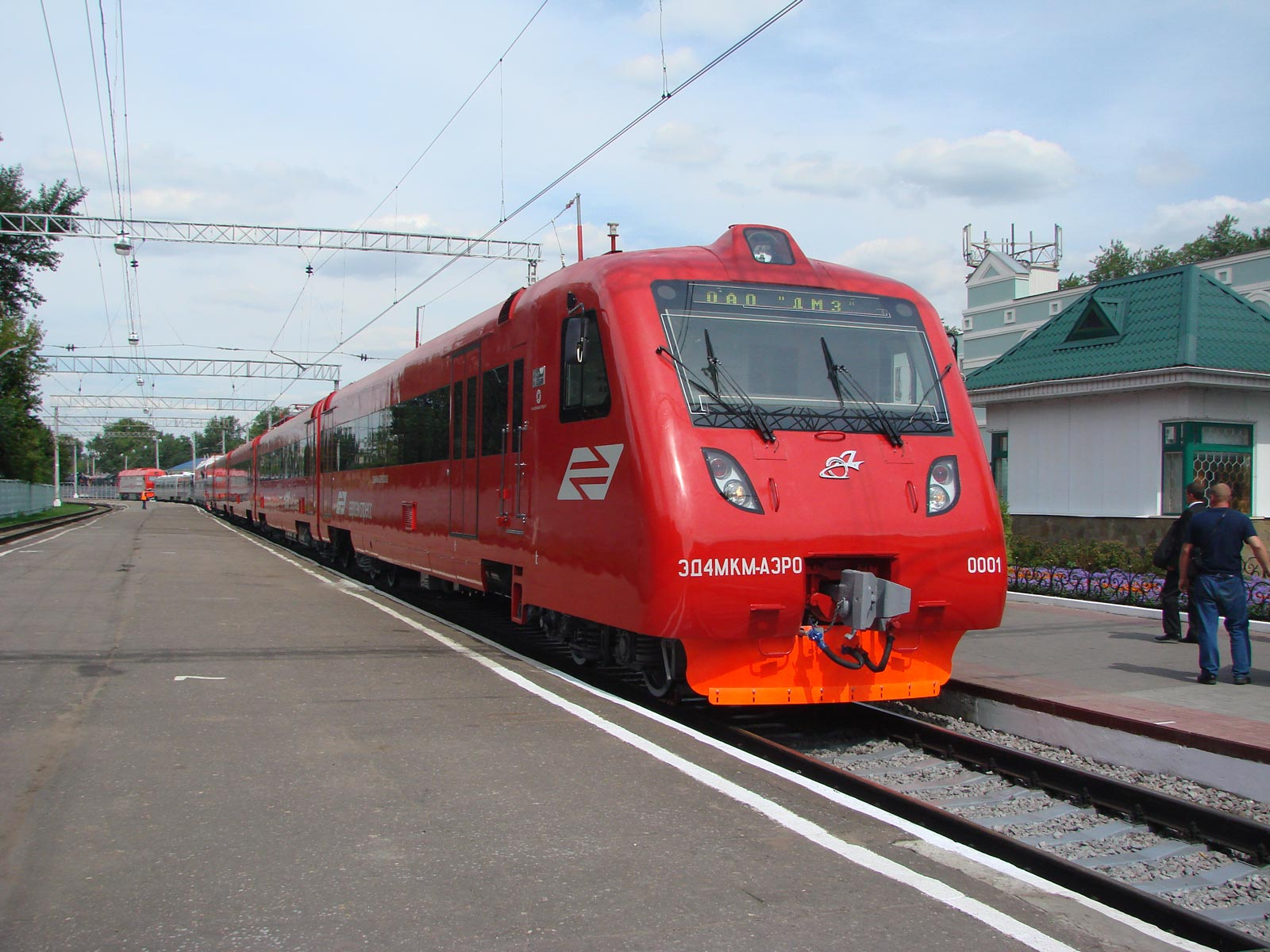
- ED4MKM-AERO-0001 EMU for Aeroexpress company. Exhibition at Rizhsky Stn.

Overview
- Headquarters: Moscow
- Locale: Russia
- Dates of operation: 2002–current

Technical
- Track gauge: 1,520 mm (4 ft 11 27/32 in) Russian gauge

Other
- Website: http://aeroexpress.ru/en/

Aeroexpress Ltd. (Russian: ООО "Аэроэкспресс") is the operator of airport rail link services in Russia. It is founded in 2005 and is owned by Russian Railways (50%), TransGroup AS (25%), Iskander Makhmudov (17.5%), and Andrei Bokarev (7.5%). Until 2012, the company only provided the rail transportation services between Moscow rail terminals and Moscow airports (Sheremetyevo, Domodedovo, and Vnukovo). The company previously also provided the rail link services to Kazan's Kazan International Airport, Sochi's Adler Airport, and Vladivostok's Knevichi Airport.

In 2012, Aeroexpress transported 17.4 million passengers.

== History ==
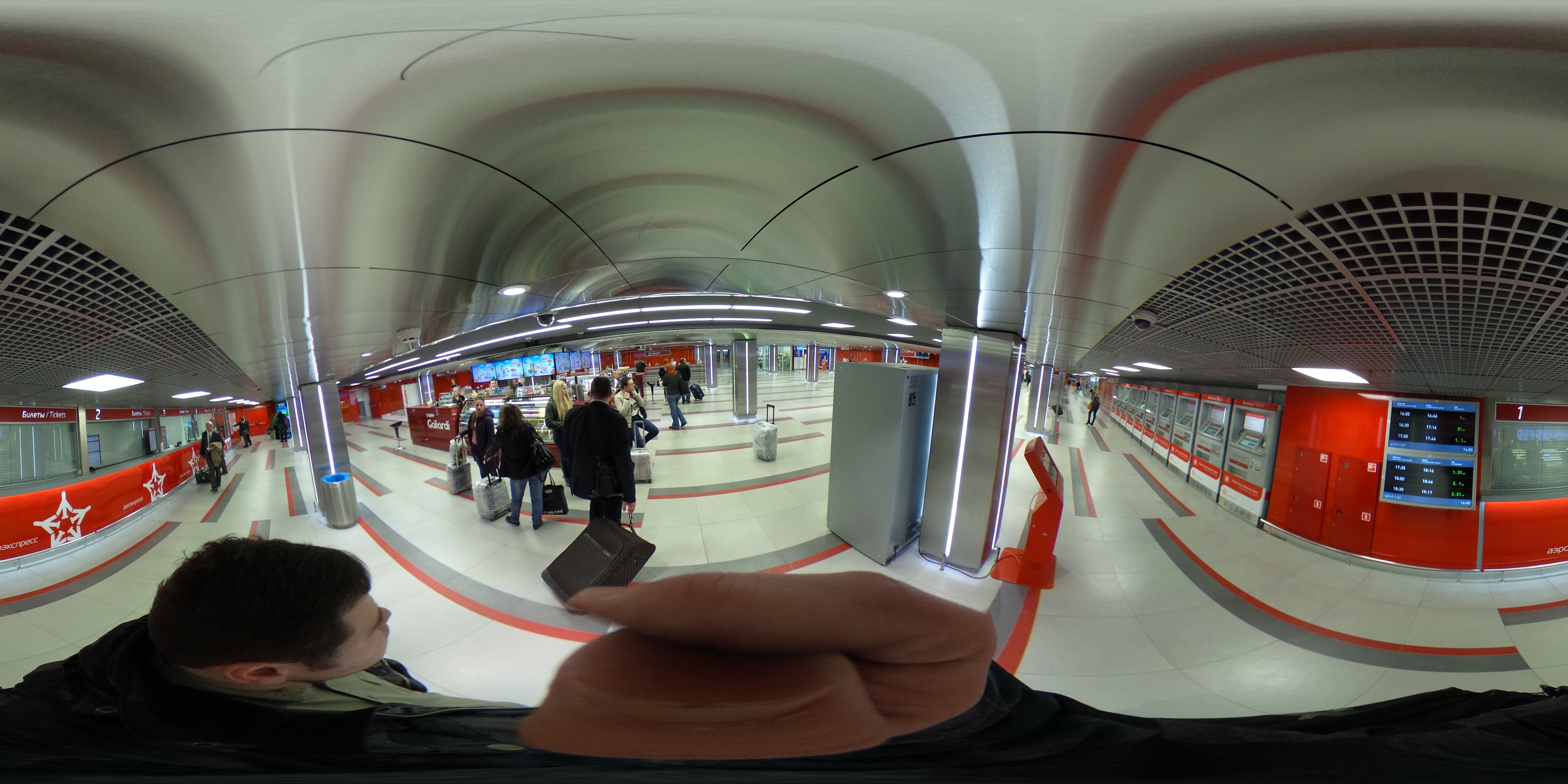
Upgraded Aeroexpress terminal at Paveletsky Rail Terminal

The first rail link connected Moscow and Sheremetyevo Airport in 2002. In May 2008, Aeroexpress began to provide the rail link between Moscow and Vnukovo Airport (the line opened in August 2005). In July 2008, the company became the sole operator of rail links from Savyolovsky Rail Terminal (Butyrskaya Vokzal) and Belorussky Rail Terminal to Sheremetyevo airport and Lobnya, from Paveletsky Rail Terminal to Domodedovo airport, and from Kiyevsky Rail Terminal to Vnukovo airport.

In February 2012, the service on the first non-Moscow link, connecting Sochi with its airport, began operations, followed in late July by a similar link in Vladivostok and, in 2013, Kazan. On its Vladivostok route the company also offered a limited commuter service at discounted prices. Services on routes outside Moscow were handed to other companies in early 2015 due to heavy losses and the "current macroeconomic situation".

== Rolling stock ==
=== Current ===
Model	Number of trains	Cars per train	Line	Start of service
ED4MKM-AERO	7	8 or 10	Moscow-Paveletskaya — Domodedovo	since 2009 since 2020 (to DME)
ESh2 «Eurasia»	11	4 or 6	Odintsovo — Sheremetyevo (Terminals D, E, F)	since 2017

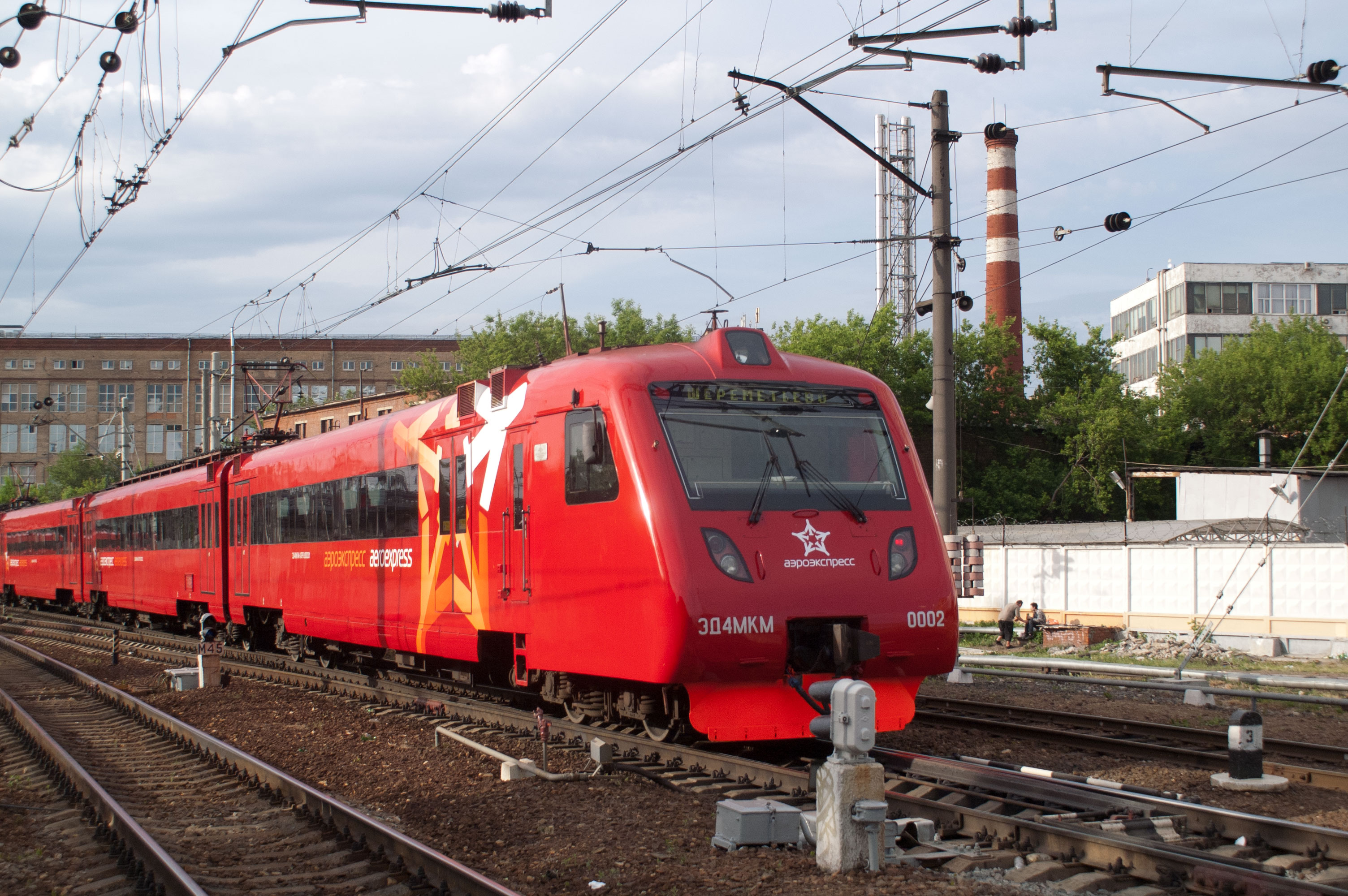
ED4MKM-AERO

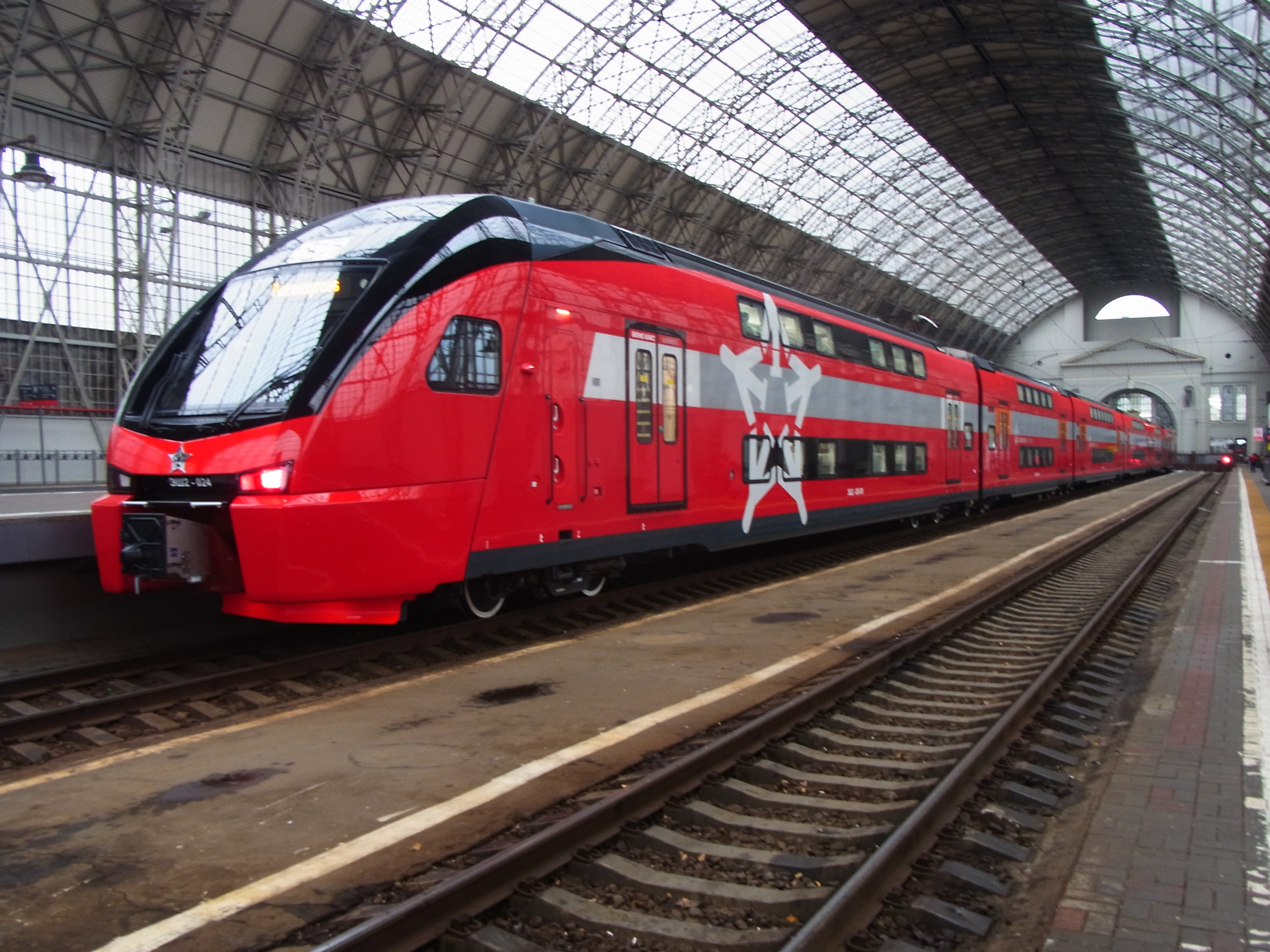
ESh2 «Eurasia»

=== Bus Fleet ===
Model	Number of buses	Line	Start of service
LiAZ-5292	8	Khovrino Metro Station/"Severniye Vorota" Bus Terminal — Sheremetyevo (Terminals A, B, C)	since 2019

=== Retired ===
Model	Number of trains	Cars per train	Line	Time of service
EM2	?	6, 8 or 10	Moscow-Paveletskaya — Domodedovo	2002 - 2010
EM2I	?	6, 8 or 10	Moscow-Paveletskaya — Domodedovo	2004 — 2010
ED4M	?	8, 10 or 11	Moscow-Belorusskaya — Sheremetyevo; Moscow-Paveletskaya — Domodedovo; Moscow-Kievskaya — Vnukovo	2007 — 2018
ED9M	4	6	Vladivostok — Knevichi Airport	2012 — 2015
ES1 «Lastochka»	?	5	Kazan-Passazirskaya — Kazan Airport; Sochi railway station — Sochi-Adler Airport	2013 — 2015

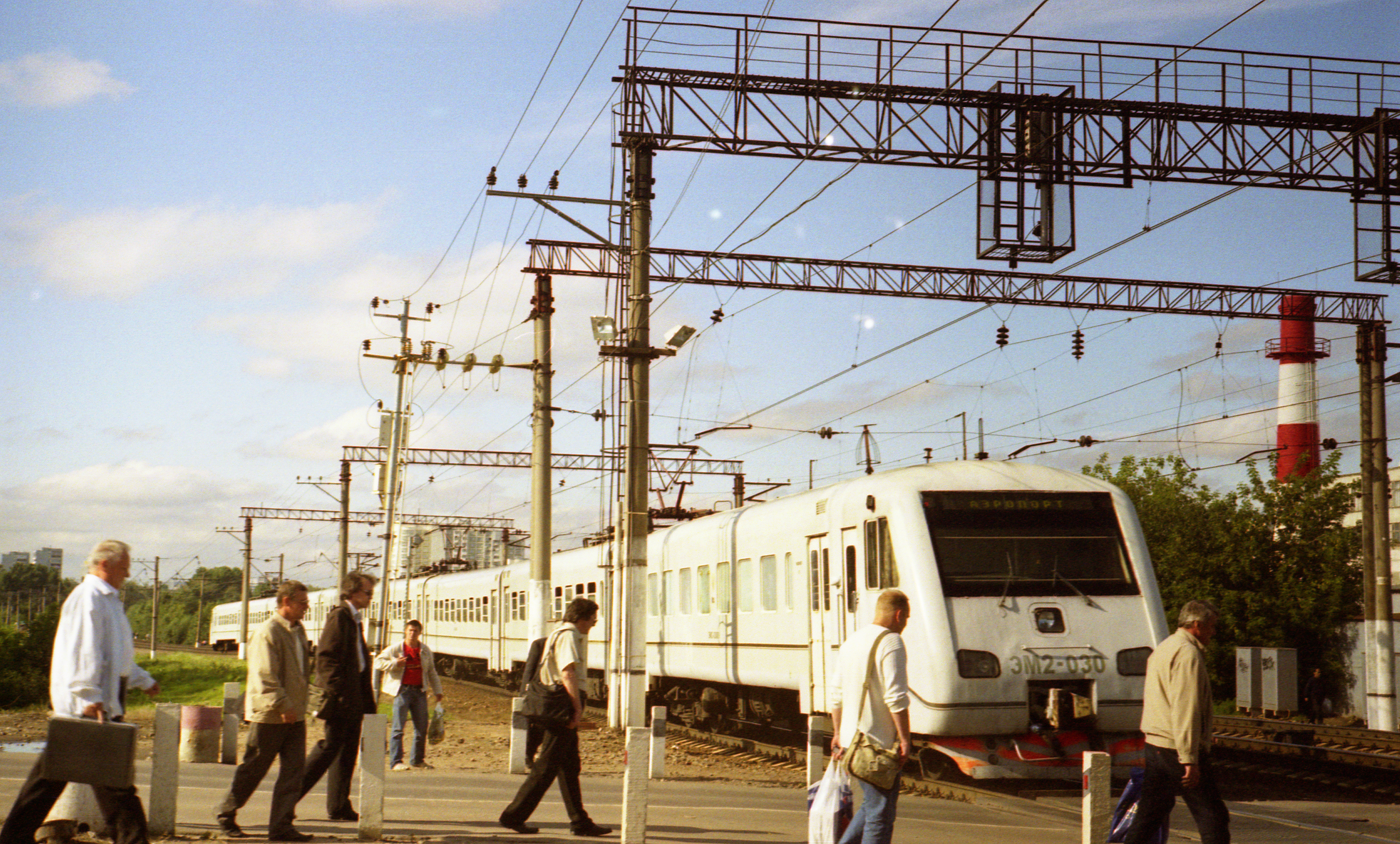
Retired EM2 on approach to Domodedovo in 2008

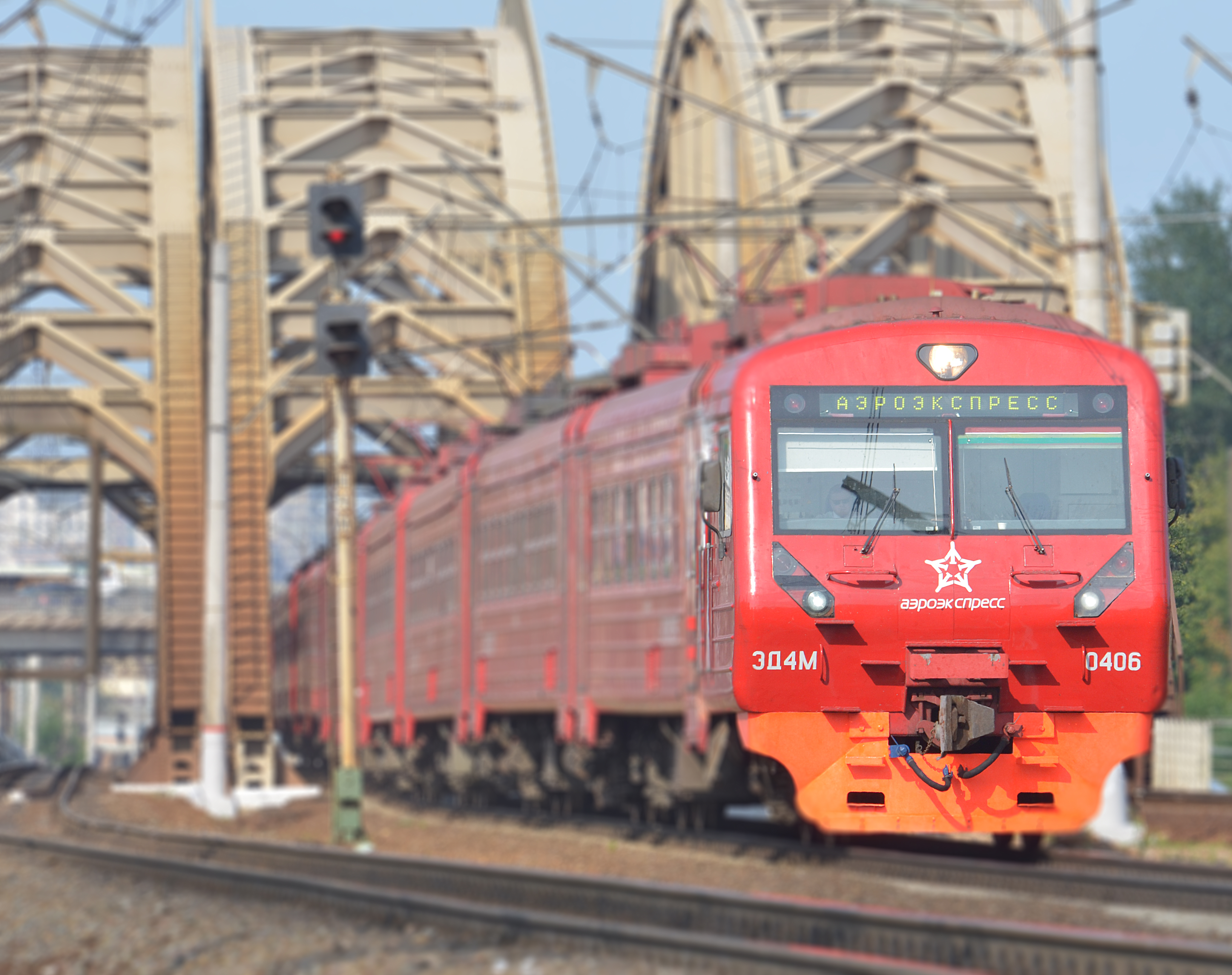
Retired ED4M on approach to Domodedovo in 2013

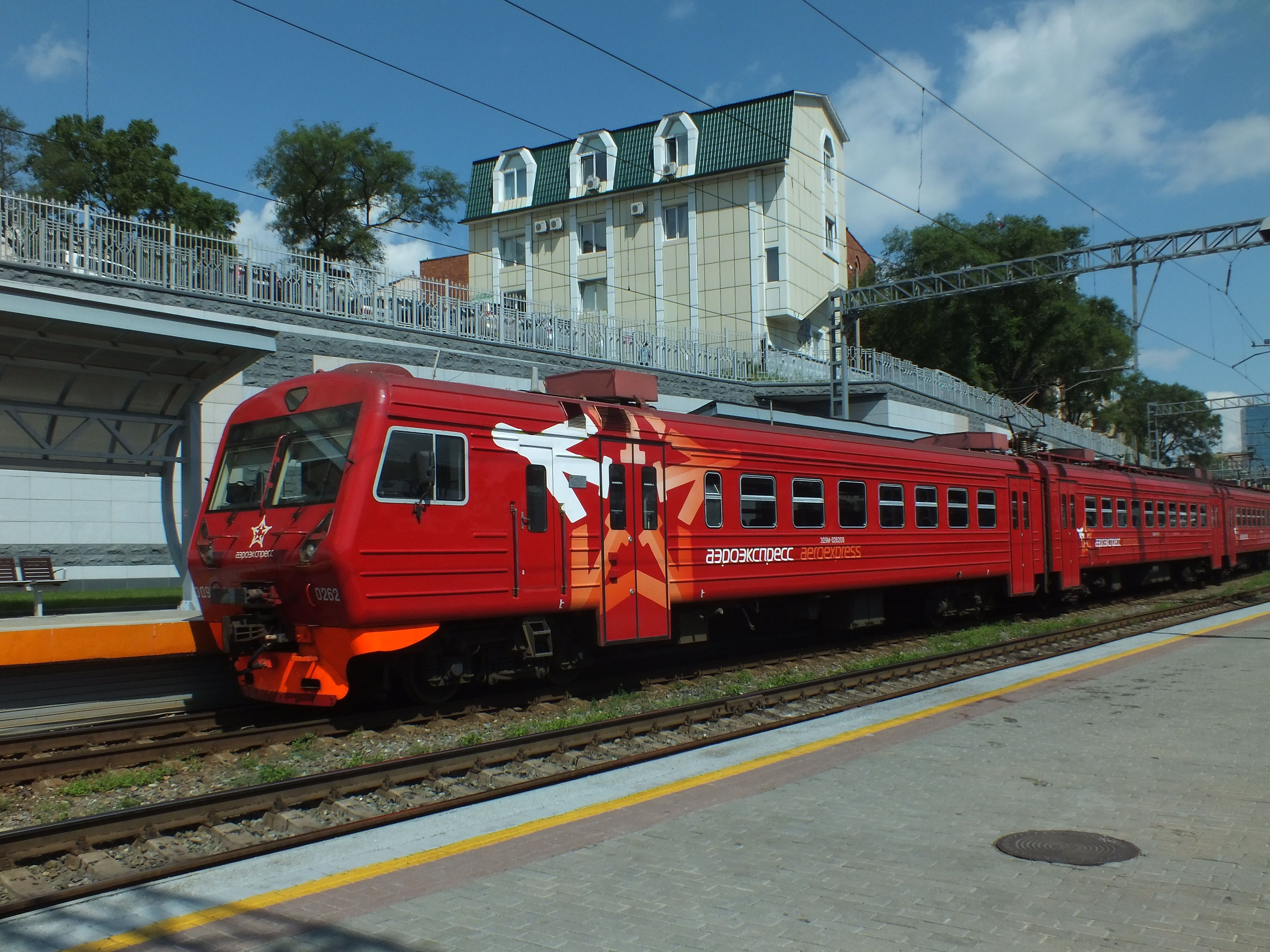
Retired ED9M in Vladivostok in 2015

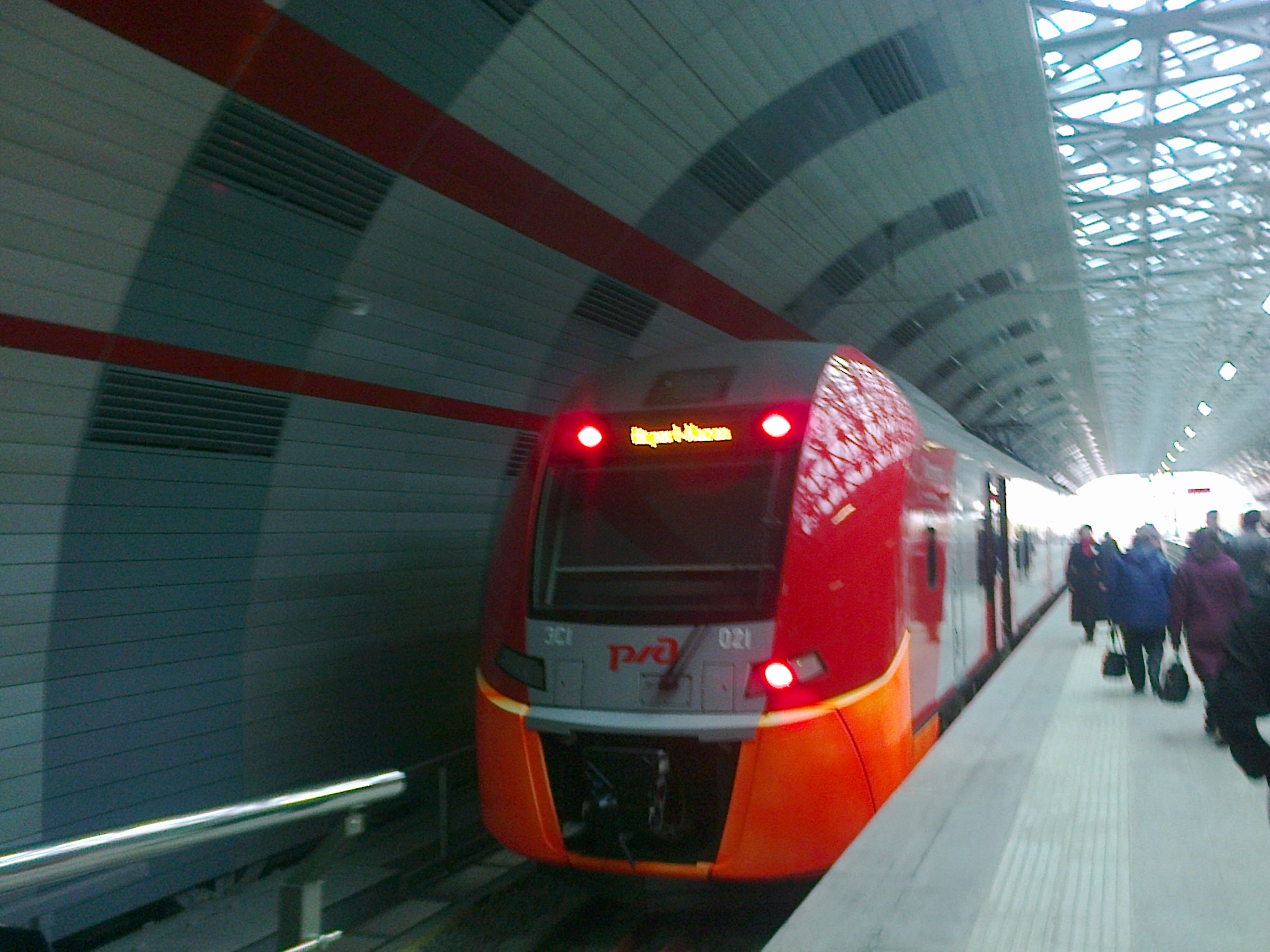
Retired ES1 in Kazan International Airport in 2013

== Routes list ==
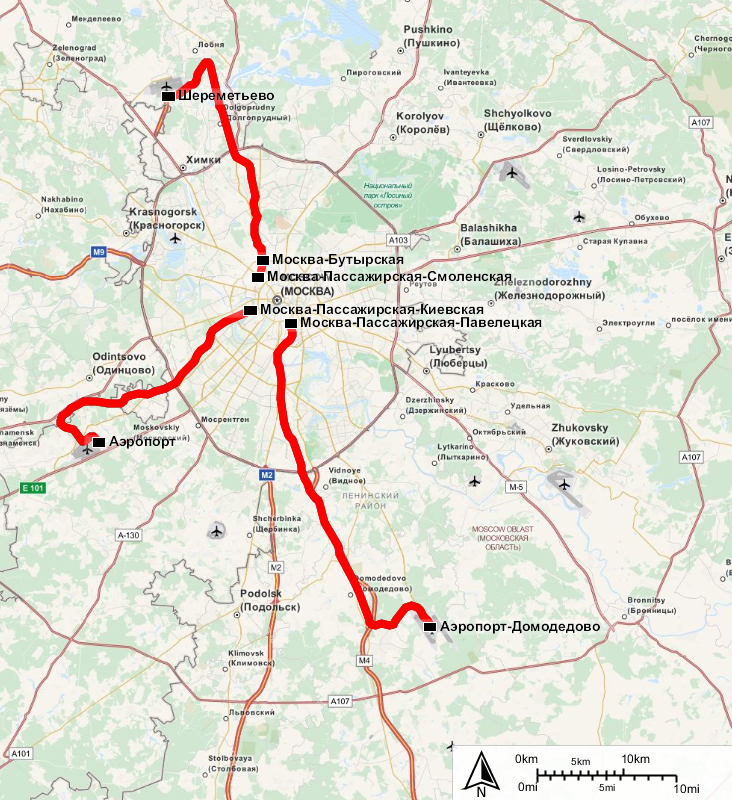
Aeroexpress routes in Moscow region

=== Aeroexpress Railway Routes ===
- Moscow, Paveletsky Rail Terminal - Aeroport Domodedovo (Domodedovo Airport) via Verkhnie Kotly railway station and Domodedovo railway station.
- Odintsovo - Sheremetyevo (Sheremetyevo Airport (Terminals D, E, F)) via Belorusskiy Rail Terminal, Savyolovskiy Rail Terminal, Okruzhnaya railway station, Lianozovo railway station and Sheremetyevo Airport (Terminals B, C).

=== Aeroexpress Bus Service Routes ===
- 1195: Moscow, Khovrino Metro station - Sheremetyevo Airport, Terminals B, C.
- 1195D: Moscow, Khovrino Metro station - Sheremetyevo Airport, Terminal D.
- 1185: Moscow, Domodedovskaya Metro station - Domodedovo Airport.

==== Future Routes ====
- Novosibirsk, Novosybirsk-Glavny Rail Terminal - Aeroport Tolmachevo (Tolmachevo Airport) (before 2025)
- St. Petersburg, Vitebsky Rail Terminal - Aeroport Pulkovo (Pulkovo Airport) (EIS 2022, construction to commence in 2018)

=== Former routes ===
- Kazan, Kazan–Passazhirskaya Rail Terminal - Kazan International Airport: handed to "Sodruzhestvo" since January 2015.
- Moscow, Kievskiy Rail Terminal - Aeroport (Vnukovo Airport): handed to CPPK since July 2024.
- Sochi, Sochi Rail Terminal - Sochi International Airport: handed to Russian Railways since June 2015.
- Vladivostok - Vladivostok Airport (Knevichi railway station): handed to "Express Primorya" since January 2015.

==== "REX" routes (handed to "CPPK") ====
- Moscow, Savelovskiy Rail Terminal - Lobnya
- Moscow, Belorussky Rail Terminal - Mozhaysk
- Moscow, Kazansky Rail Terminal - Golutvin
- Moscow, Yaroslavsky Rail Terminal - Pushkino
- Moscow, Yaroslavsky Rail Terminal - Fryazino
- Moscow, Yaroslavsky Rail Terminal - Monino
- Moscow, Paveletsky Rail Terminal - Ozherelye

== International cooperation ==
Aeroexpress is a member of the International Air-Rail Organisation (IARO). Aeroexpress has taken into consideration the experience, quality standards and spectrum of services provided by its colleagues in Germany, UK, Sweden and US.

== Recent news ==
In January 2015, Moscow Department of Transport expressed initiative to transfer the Aeroexpress terminal from Belorussky to Savelovsky Railway Station. However, citizens voted against this proposal. In May 2013, Aeroexpress announced it intends to decrease the headway between consecutive trains in Moscow to 15 minutes over the next few years. Currently, the headway between consecutive trains is 30 minutes. In February 2013, Aeroexpress ordered 25 double decker electro-motor units. The first train was delivered from Switzerland in August 2014.
