= Novki (settlement), Vladimir Oblast =

Novki Новки
- Settlement
- Location within Vladimir Oblast Location within Russia
- Coordinates: 56°21′N 41°04′E
- Country: Russia
- Region: Vladimir Oblast
- District: Kameshkovsky District
- Time zone: UTC+3:00

Novki (Russian: Новки) is a rural locality (a settlement) in Bryzgalovskoye Rural Settlement, Kameshkovsky District, Vladimir Oblast, Russia. The population was 1,616 as of 2010. There are 23 streets.

== Geography ==
Novki is located 5 km east of Kameshkovo (the district's administrative centre) by road. Druzhba is the nearest rural locality.
