= Perm II railway station =

Railway station in Perm, Russia

Coordinates: 58°01′13.04″N 56°15′09.11″E

Perm II Железнодорожный вокзал «Станция Пермь-II»

General information
- Other names: Perm-Zaimki, Perm Station
- Location: Russia, Perm
- Platforms: 5

History
- Opened: 1899

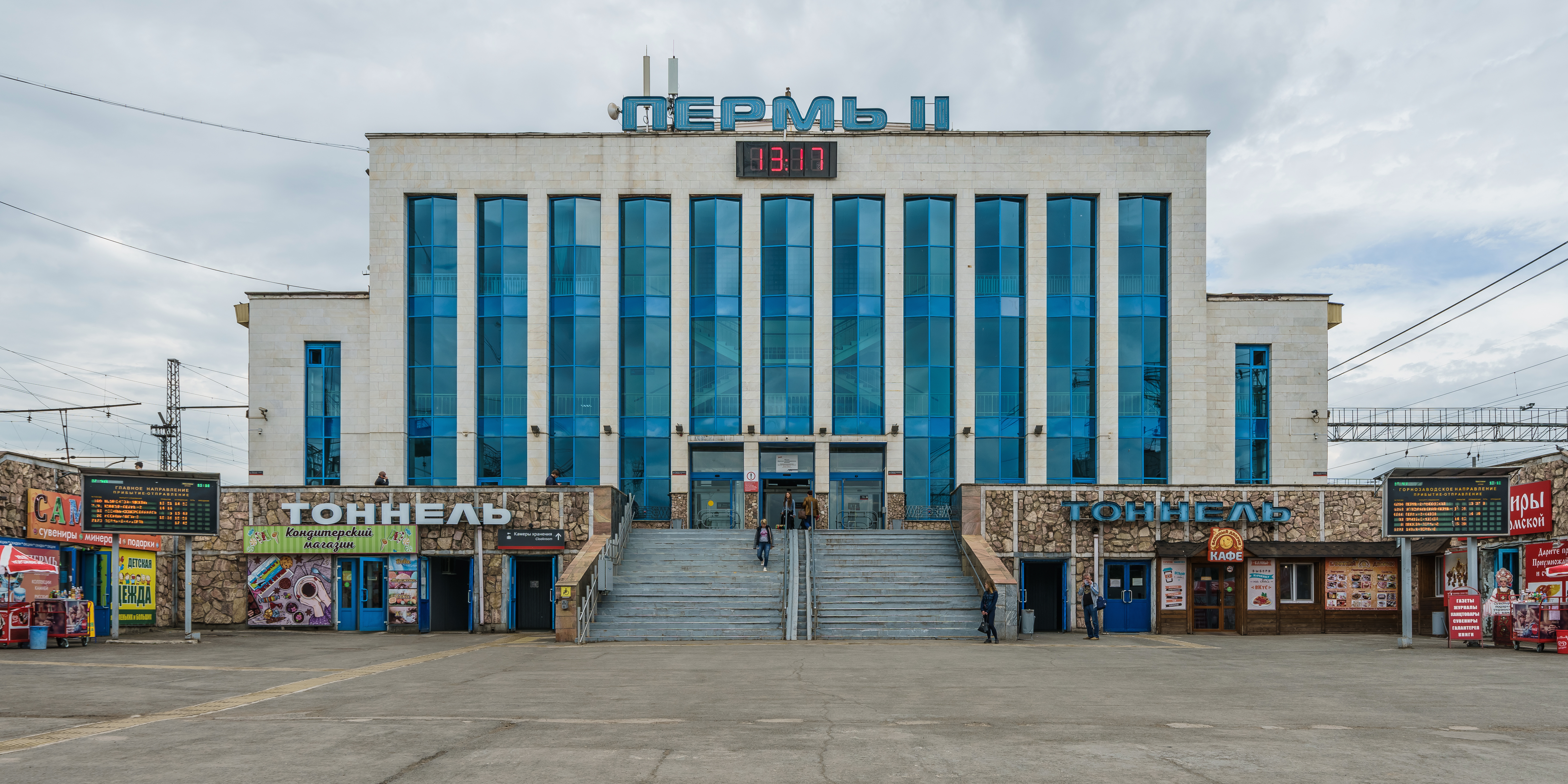
Station building

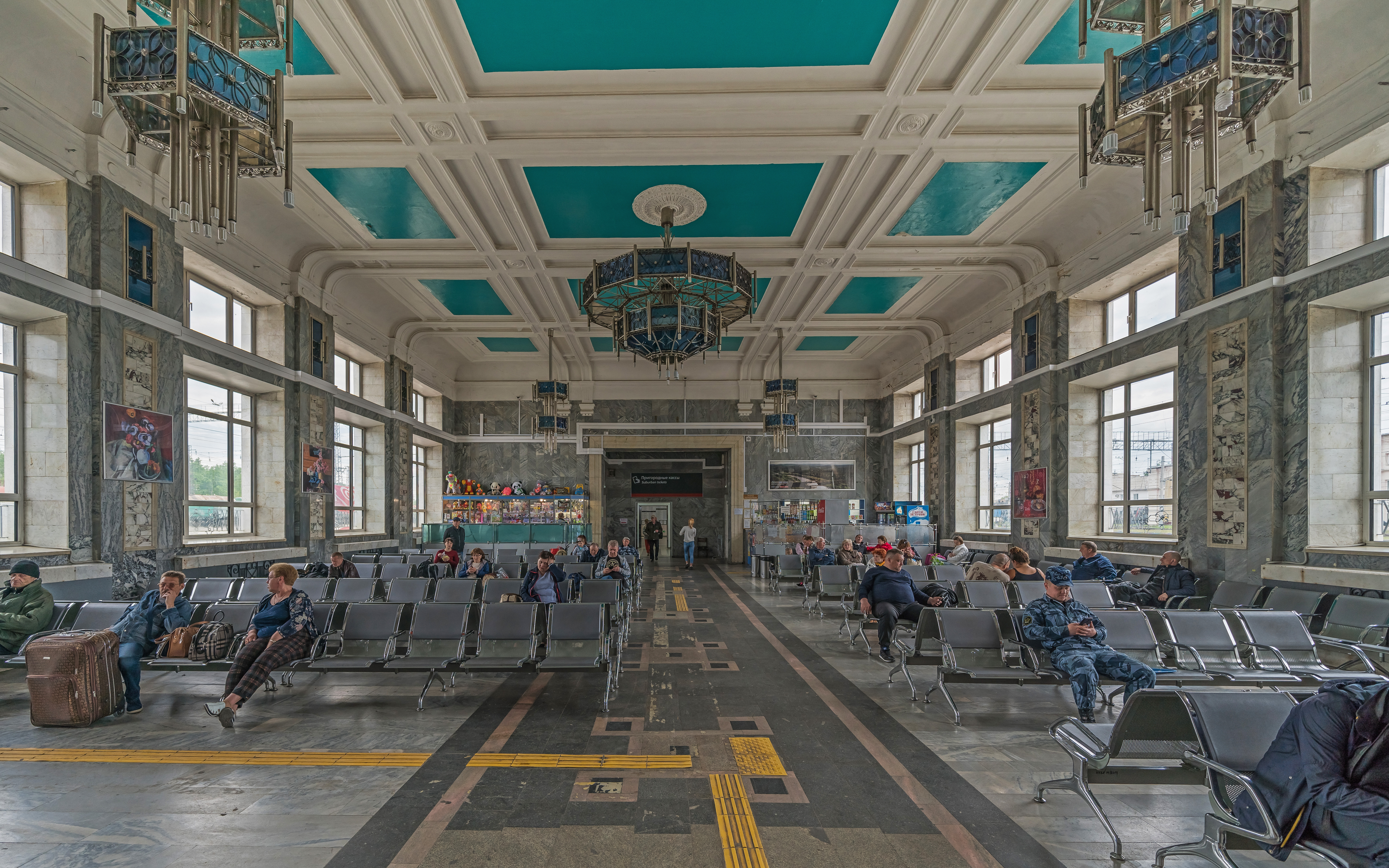
Waiting room

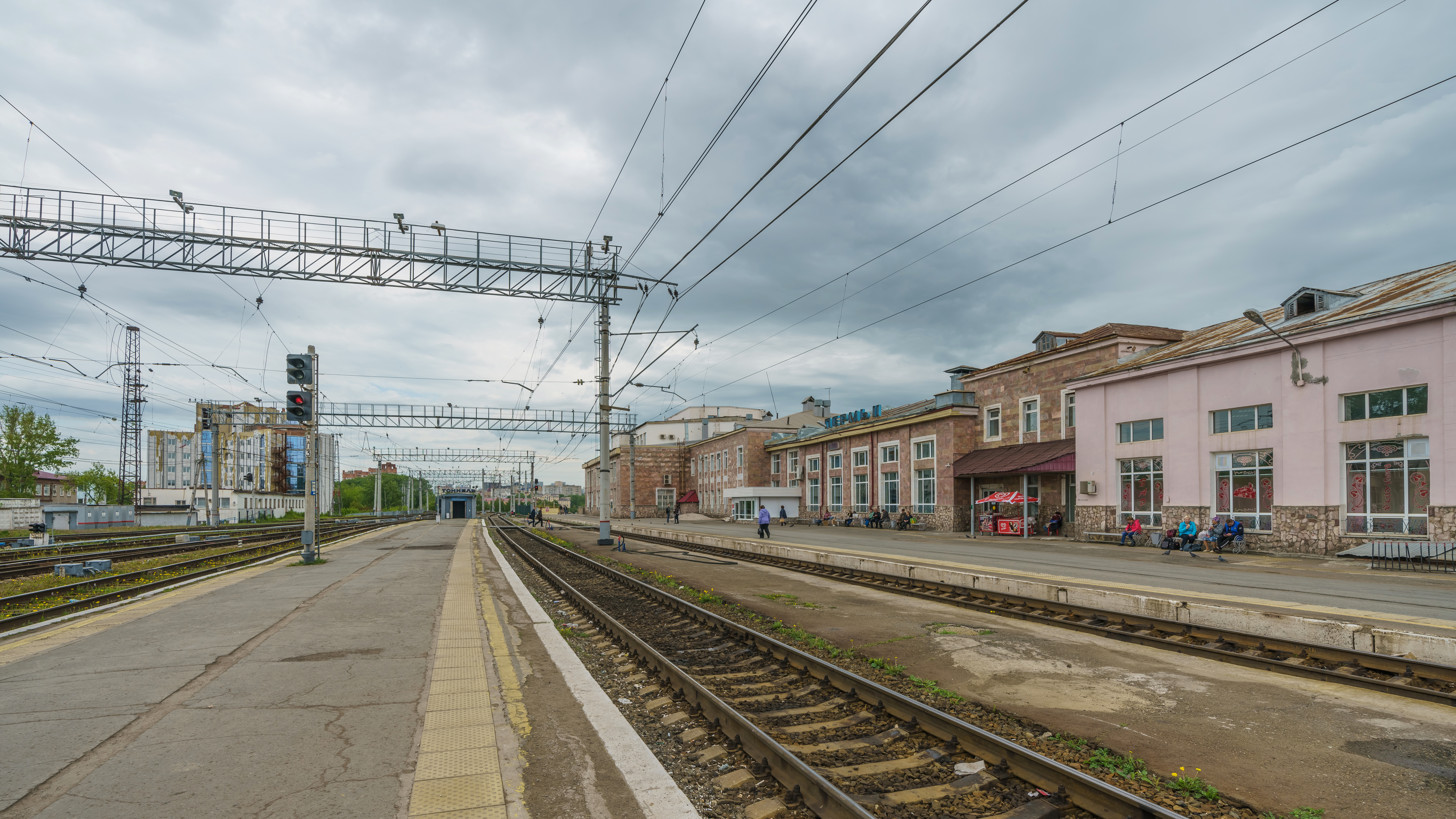
Platforms

Perm II (Russian: Железнодорожный вокзал «Станция Пермь-II») is the main railway station of the Russian city of Perm. It is also known as Perm-Zaimki or simply as Perm Station.

== History ==
The Zaimka Station was built in 1899, approximately 5 kilometers from the Perm Station. Townspeople were attracted to clean air, building space and proximity to the Kama River.

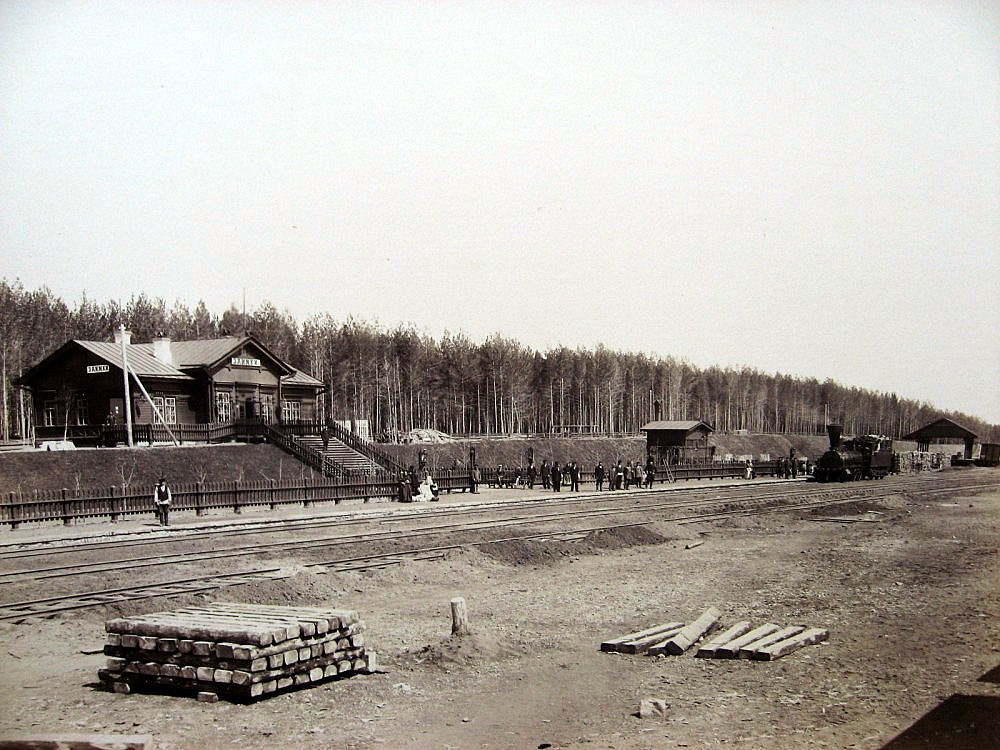
'Zaimki' Station building in 1901

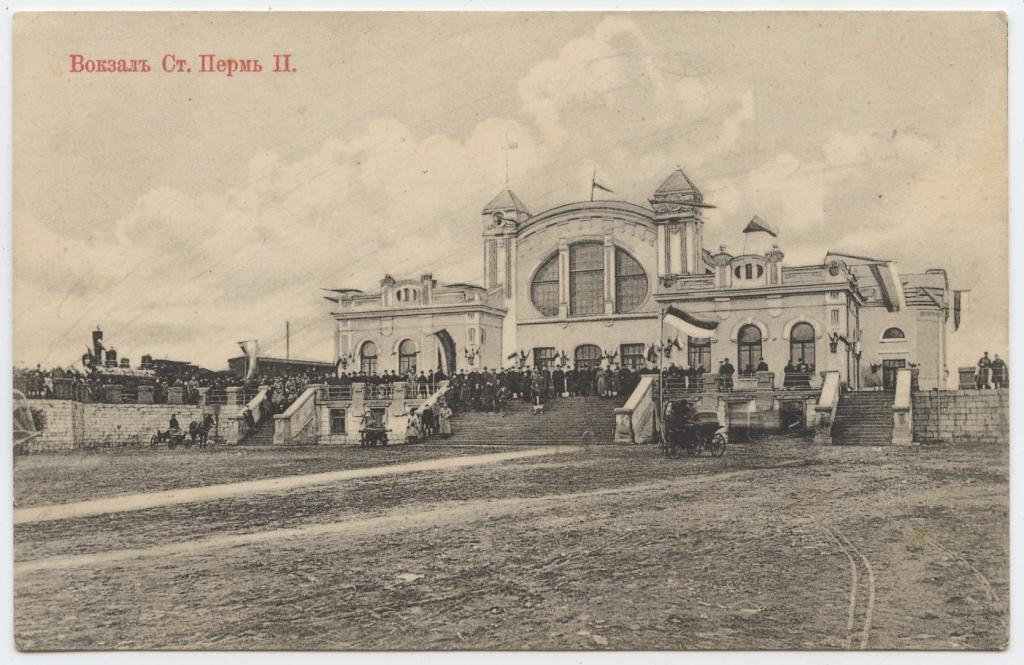
'Perm-II' Station building in 1910-1917

The first building for "Perm the Second" station was built in 1909. The station was located far outside the city, so reaching it required transport. People first used the Yamschik (Post rider) and later the car. Hence, the legend that the AP is based on Chekhov plays "Three Sisters" put the lives of the provincial city of Perm.

Over time, the station could not handle increased traffic, and a new larger building was constructed.

Station Perm-II is the main railway access point into Perm Territory. 15,000 passengers passed through the station daily. It was a beautiful building of white brick, situated on open land and clearly visible from the city. In 1959, the first expansion and reconstruction began; the station was extended to the west. It was also decided to build additional two floors for the station.

In 1988, another ambitious expansion plan was drawn up. The suburban cashier and the luggage compartment would be housed in a new building with a height of 29 meters. The plan would allow passengers to go directly from the bus or tram platforms through an underground pedestrian walkway and escalators. However, the construction cost of 3 million rubles (1988 value) prevented the plan from being implemented.

Now the station Perm-II is significantly altered in appearance: the floor and walls are marble of a dark milky grey color. The doors have been replaced for passengers' comfort while and the lights have been rearranged to be the same as in the subway. Repairs were also made in the overflights stairsteps to the second floor, which are also done in marble.

The meeting was presented developed railway reconstruction project design buildings station. Today, it laid recovery railway platforms, building overhang above the gate. However storey building and its total area has not yet been determined.

Krai Administration while considering the possibility of reconstruction railway station Perm II together with the construction of a new bus station nearby. As long as planned, that will be able to fully realize the project from 2010.

== Destinations ==
=== Major Domestic Destinations ===
Western destinations: Moscow, St. Petersburg, Simferopol, Adler, Nizhny Novgorod, Novorossiysk.

Eastern destinations: Vladivostok, Yekaterinburg, Tyumen, N. Tagil, Abakan, Chelyabinsk, Novokuznetsk, Priobe, Kemerovo, Nizhnevartovsk, N. Urengoy, Irkutsk, Krasnoyarsk, Novosibirsk, Severobaikalsk, Khabarovsk and Gornozavodsk.

Gornozavodsk destinations: Gornozavodsk, N. Tagil, Serov, Berezniki.

=== International Routes ===
Train number	Train name	Destination	Operated by
001М/002Щ	Rossiya; Россия	(Russia) Moscow (Yaroslavsky) (Russia) Vladivostok (cars: (North Korea) Pyongyang, (North Korea) Tumangang)	(Russia) Russian Railways
003З/004З		(Russia) Moscow (Yaroslavsky) (China) Beijing (Main); Runs through Mongolia	China Railway
005Щ/006Щ		(Russia) Moscow (Yaroslavsky) (Mongolia) Ulaanbaatar (cars: (Mongolia) Erdenet)	(Russia) Russian Railways (Mongolia) Ulaanbataar Railway
019Ч/020Щ	Vostok; Восток	(Russia) Moscow (Yaroslavsky) (China) Beijing (Main)	(Russia) Russian Railways
063Б/064Б		(Belarus) Minsk (cars: (Belarus) Brest) (Russia) Novosibirsk	(Belarus) Belarusian Railways
