= Vladivostok railway station =

Railway station in Vladivostok, Russia

Vladivostok Владивосто́к
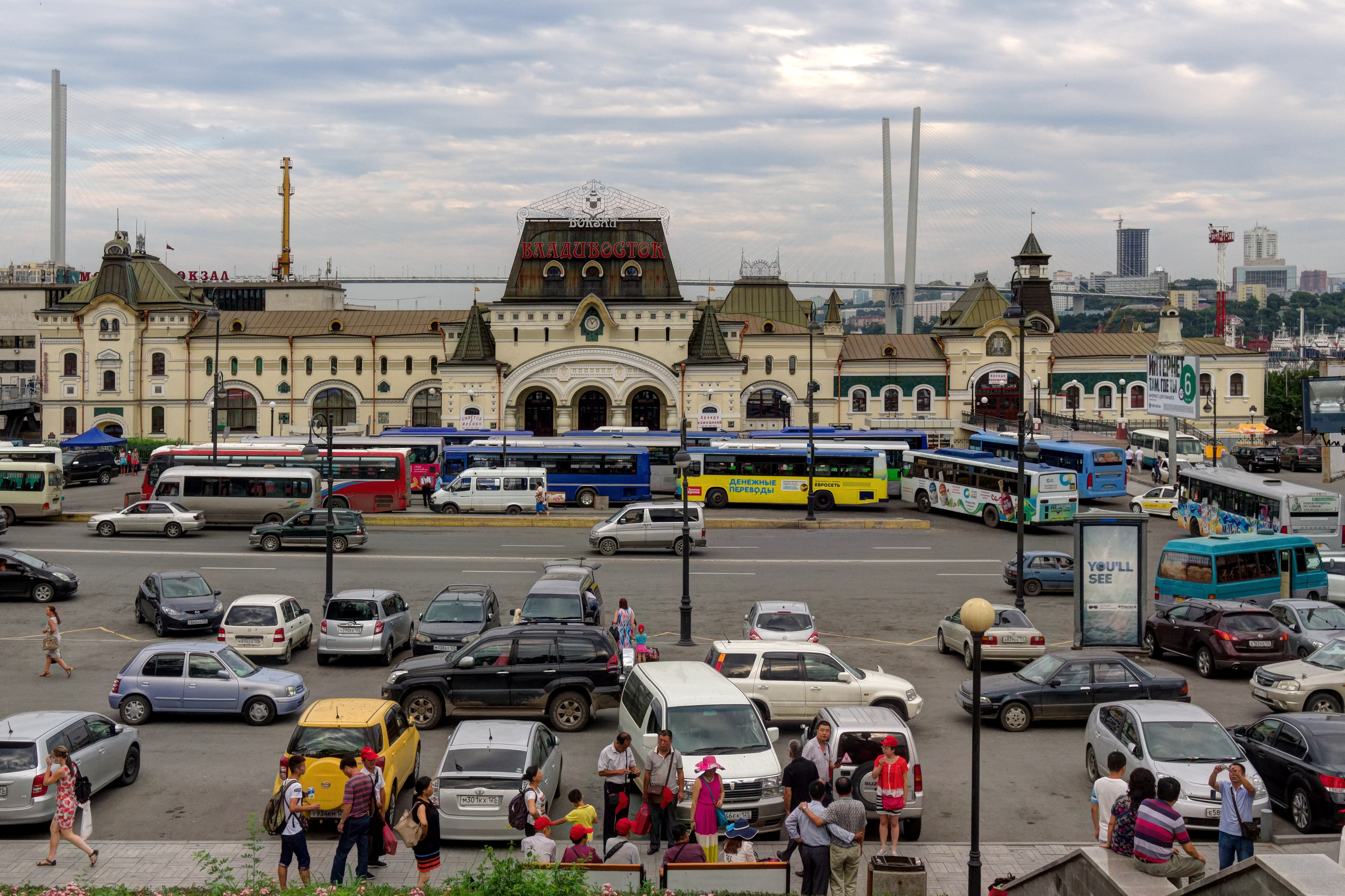

General information
- Location: Ulitsa Aleutskaya, 2, Vladivostok; Primorsky Krai; Russia
- Coordinates: 43°6′40.18″N 131°52′53.58″E
- Owner: Russian Railways
- Operator: Far Eastern Railway
- Platforms: 3
- Tracks: 8
- Connections: Bus: 7, 13, 31, 39d, 45, 49, 106 Shared taxi: 107, 114

Construction
- Parking: Yes
- Accessible: Yes
- Architect: P.E. Bazilevsky
- Architectural style: Russian 17th century

Other information
- Station code: 98000
- Fare zone: 0

History
- Opened: 2 November 1893

Services
Preceding station	Russian Railways	Following station
Ugolnaya towards Moscow Yaroslavsky	Moscow–Vladivostok	Terminus
Ugolnaya towards Knevichi	Express Primorya	Terminus
Location

Vladivostok railway station is a railway station in Vladivostok, Russia. It is the eastern terminus of the Trans-Siberian Railway. Also, Aeroexpress (Express Primorya) from this station to Vladivostok International Airport (Knevichi Railway Station) are operated.

== History ==
The author of the project, architect P.E. Bazilevsky, took part in laying the station building, laying the first stone of the structure on May 19 (31), 1891 in the presence of Tsarevich Nikolai Aleksandrovich, the future emperor Nicholas II. On November 2, 1893, a solemn consecration of the station took place, and a rail link along the route Vladivostok - Ussuriysk was opened.

Initially, it was a stone building with an iron roof, in the middle of the one-story, on the edges - a two-story. The floors in the building were covered with clay Japanese plates - they are well preserved to this day. In 1910–1912, in connection with the construction of Moscow Yaroslavsky railway station, the station in Vladivostok was designed and expanded by the civil engineering engineer V. A. Planson in the image and similarity of Yaroslavsky, creating architecturally finished stations at both ends of the Trans-Siberian Railway. The original building became one of the parts of the railway station. On the western facade was the mosaic coat of arms of the Primorskaya Oblast, and on the east - the coat of arms of Moscow. Since 1924, the appearance of the building began to change gradually: a two-headed eagle was shot, mosaic panels with coats of arms disappeared under a layer of plaster, and relief images of glazed ceramics on Russian folklore and fairy tales. The color of the facade has changed from yellow to green. In 1936, the interiors of the station were painted by the artist G. Grigorovich, and twenty years later V. Gerasimenko painted the ticket hall, creating a panel "Our Great Motherland" there. In the 1970s and 1980s, the outer walls were painted green. The restoration of the building, carried out between 1994 and 1996 by the Russian-Italian company Tegola Canadese, brought the building closer to its pre-revolutionary appearance.

== Gallery ==
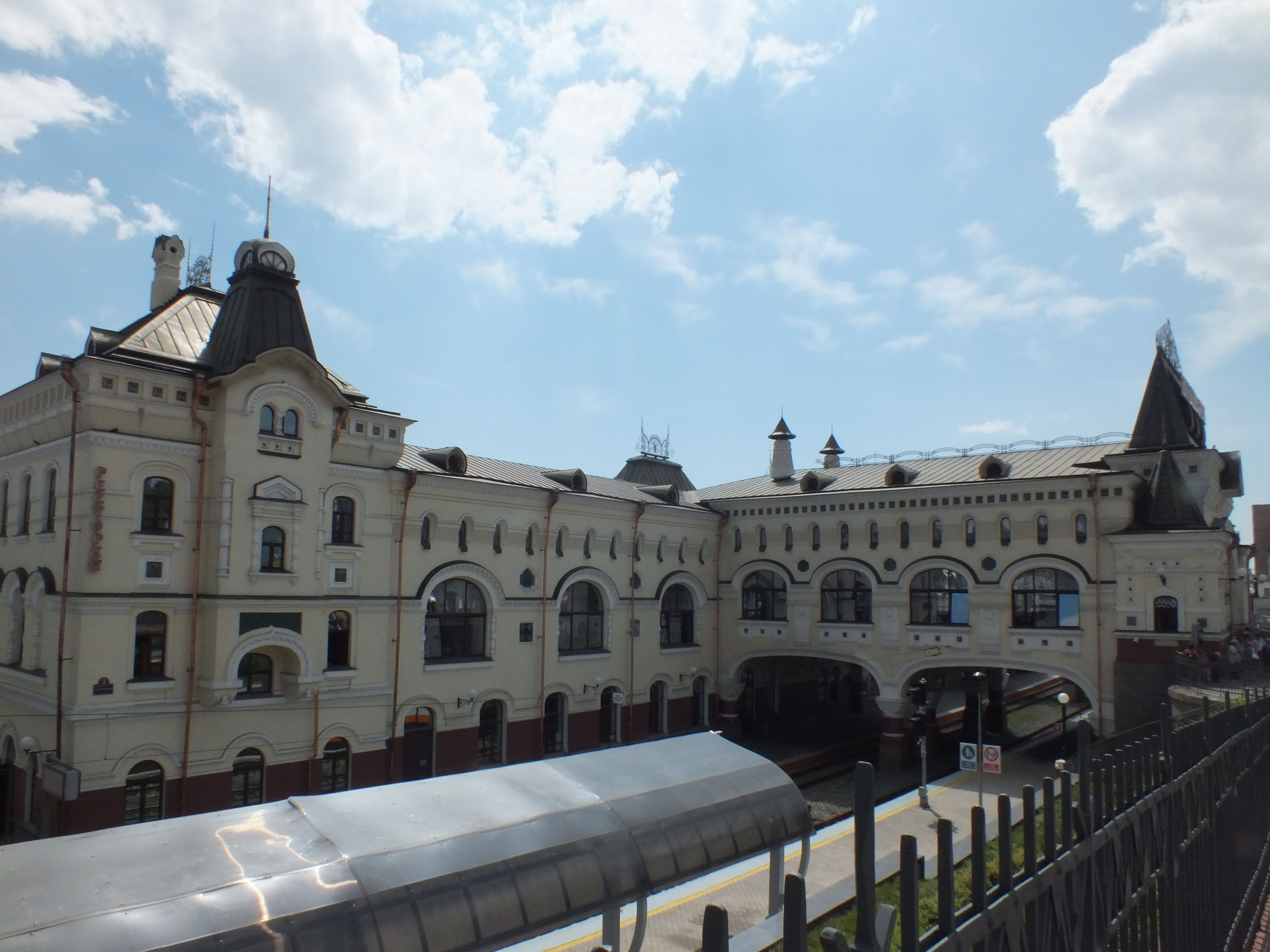
Trains pass under the waiting room

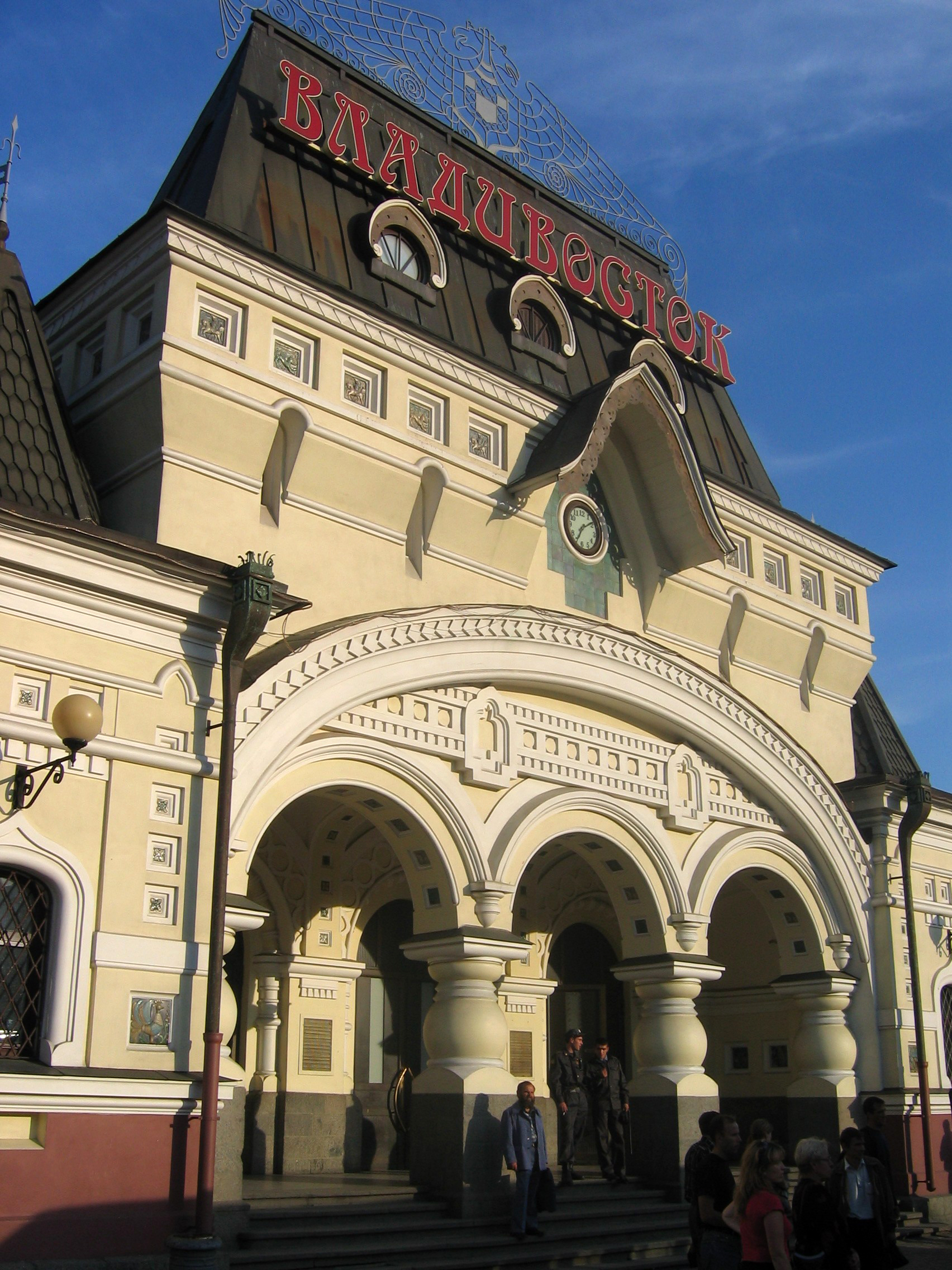
Vladivostok Railway station

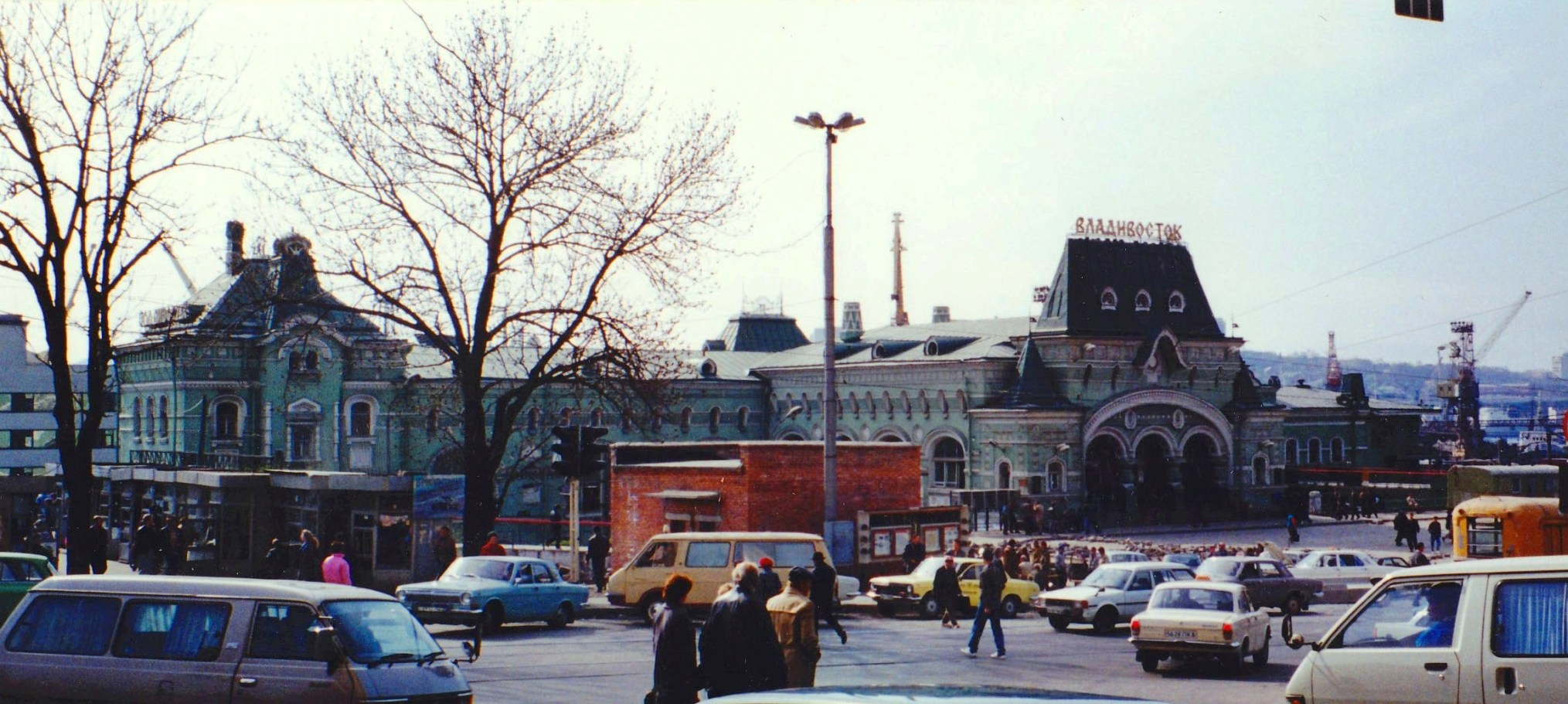
Vladivostok railway station in 1992

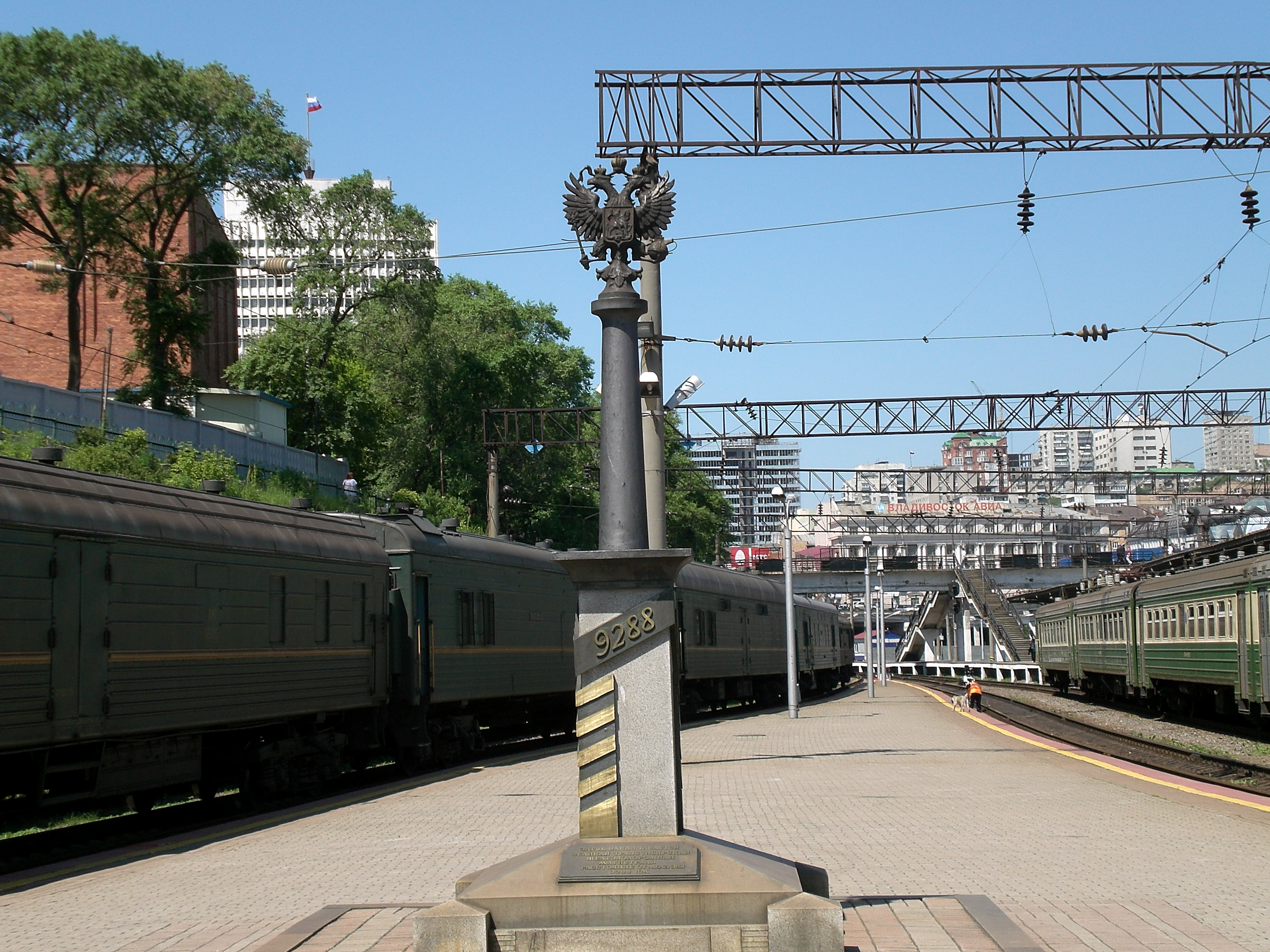
The marker for kilometer 9,288 (mile 5,771.3) at the end of the Trans-Siberian Railway at Vladivostok railway station
