= Yakhroma (river) =

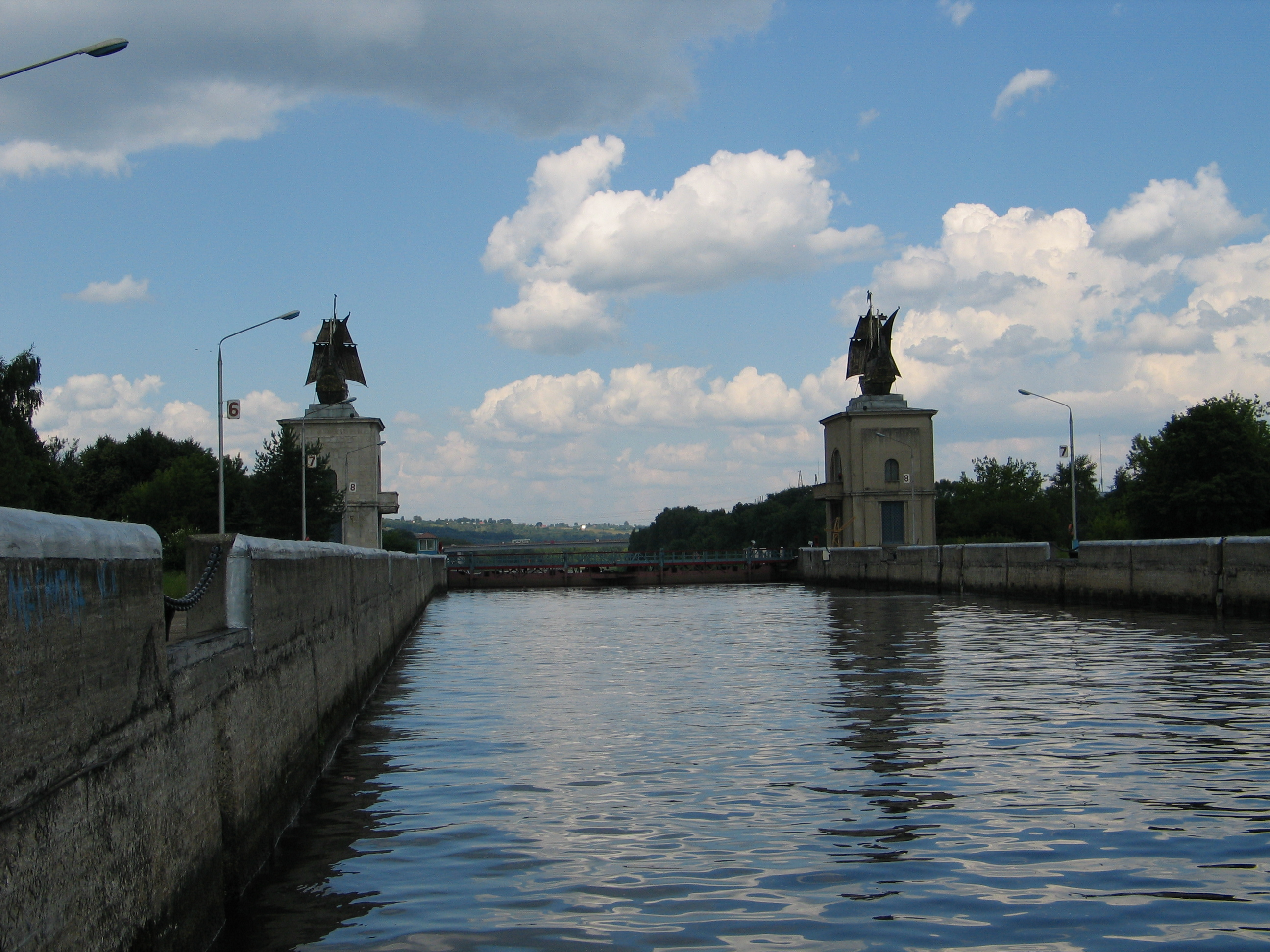
- A sluice at the crossing of the Yakhroma and the Moscow Canal
- Native name: Яхрома (Russian)

Location
- Country: Russia

Physical characteristics
- Mouth: Sestra
  - coordinates: 56.5032°N 37.1127°E
- Length: 54 km (34 mi)
- Basin size: 988 km^{2} (381 sq mi)

Basin features
- Progression: Sestra→ Dubna→ Volga→ Caspian Sea

The Yakhroma (Russian: Яхрома) is a right tributary of the Sestra that flows through a network of peat marshes in the north of Moscow Oblast, Russia. It passes through the towns of Dmitrov and Yakhroma, crossing the Moscow Canal on its way. The construction of the Moscow Canal has separated the upper course of the Yakhroma from its lower course. The lower course is 54 kilometres (34 mi) long, and has a drainage basin of 988 square kilometres (381 sq mi).

== Tributaries ==
- Volgusha
- Berezovetc
- Kuholka
- Dyatlinka
- Lbovka
