= Viktor Bruyevich =

Russian professional footballer

Personal information
- Full name: Viktor Valeryevich Bruyevich
- Date of birth: 8 March 1997 (age 29)
- Place of birth: Solnechnogorsk, Moscow Oblast
- Height: 1.82 m (6 ft 0 in)
- Positions: Midfielder; forward

Youth career
- 2008–2012: Spartak Moscow
- 2012–2015: Strogino Moscow
- 2015: Lokomotiv Moscow

Senior career*
Years	Team	Apps	(Gls)
2016	Granit Mikashevichi	9	(0)
2019–2020	FC Kolomna	8	(0)
Total		17	(0)
- * Club domestic league appearances and goals as of 9 November 2019

Viktor Valeryevich Bruyevich (Russian: Виктор Валерьевич Бруевич; born 8 March 1997) is a Russian former professional footballer.
