= Senezh Lake =

Lake in Moscow Oblast, Russia

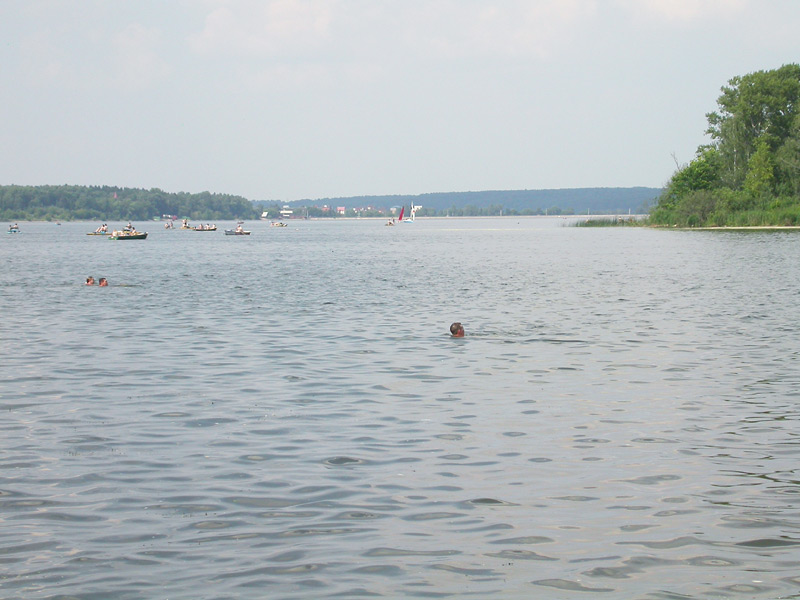

- Location within Moscow Oblast
- Location: Moscow Oblast
- Coordinates: 56°12′N 37°00′E
- Primary outflows: Sestra River
- Basin countries: Russia
- Surface area: 7 km^{2} (2.7 sq mi)
- Settlements: Solnechnogorsk

Senezh (Russian: Сенеж), also known as Senezhskoye (Сенежское), is a lake in Moscow Oblast, Russia, about 60 km northwest of Moscow. Area: 7 km². The town of Solnechnogorsk is located on its western coast. The Sestra River starts from here.
