= Solnechnogorsk =

Town in Moscow Oblast, Russia

Solnechnogorsk Солнечногорск
- Town
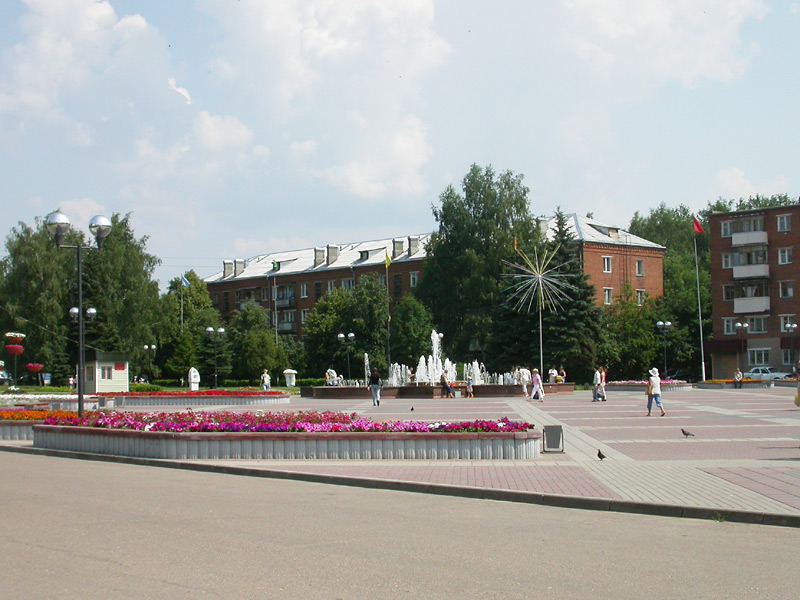
- Sovetskaya Square in Solnechnogorsk

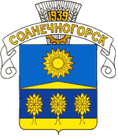
- Flag Coat of arms
- Interactive map of Solnechnogorsk
- Location of Solnechnogorsk Solnechnogorsk (Moscow Oblast)
- Coordinates: 56°11′N 36°59′E
- Country: Russia
- Federal subject: Moscow Oblast
- Administrative district: Solnechnogorsky District
- TownSelsoviet: Solnechnogorsk
- Town status since: 1938
- Elevation: 195 m (640 ft)

Population (2010 Census)
  - Total: 52,944
  - Estimate (2025): 48,678 (−8.1%)

Administrative status
  - Capital of: Solnechnogorsky District, Town of Solnechnogorsk

Municipal status
  - Municipal district: Solnechnogorsky Municipal District
  - Urban settlement: Solnechnogorsk Urban Settlement
  - Capital of: Solnechnogorsky Municipal District, Solnechnogorsk Urban Settlement
- Time zone: UTC+3 (MSK)
- Postal codes: 141501–141508, 141516, 141530
- OKTMO ID: 46771000001

Solnechnogorsk (Russian: Солнечного́рск, lit. sunny mountain town) is a town and the administrative center of Solnechnogorsky District in Moscow Oblast, Russia, located on the Moscow–St. Petersburg Highway and the Moscow–St. Petersburg railway, on the coast of Senezh Lake, 65 kilometers (40 mi) northwest from Moscow. Population: 52,944 (2010 census); 58,374 (2002 census); 55,554 (1989 Soviet census).

It was previously known as Solnechnaya Gora (until 1938).

== History ==
Originally a village known as Solnushnaya and then renamed into Solnechnaya Gora (Солнечная Гора), it was granted town status and renamed Solnechnogorsk in 1938. During World War II, Solnechnogorsk was briefly occupied by the German 4th Panzer Group from November 24 to December 12, 1941. It was one of the towns that was captured in the northern pincer of the attempted German encirclement of Moscow.

== Administrative and municipal status ==
Within the framework of administrative divisions, Solnechnogorsk serves as the administrative center of Solnechnogorsky District. As an administrative division, it is, together with twenty-five rural localities, incorporated within Solnechnogorsky District as the Town of Solnechnogorsk. As a municipal division, the Town of Solnechnogorsk is incorporated within Solnechnogorsky Municipal District as Solnechnogorsk Urban Settlement.

== Economy ==
Industry in the town is represented by a metal construction factory, a glass-works, a sports fishing business, holiday homes, sport centers, children's summer camps, and ski lodges.

== Culture ==
There is a museum of local lore in the town. Not far from Solnechnogorsk is the estate of Shakhmatovo that once belonged to a prominent Russian poet Alexander Blok; a museum of him has been opened there.

== Military ==
The town is the headquarters for the Main Centre for Missile Attack Warning. The Russian Ground Forces relocated the 18th Motor Rifle Brigade here from the Baltics from 1993 until the brigade was disbanded in 1998.

== Notable people ==
- Viktor Shalimov former hockey player
- Viktor Bruyevich football player
