= Dubna (Volga) =

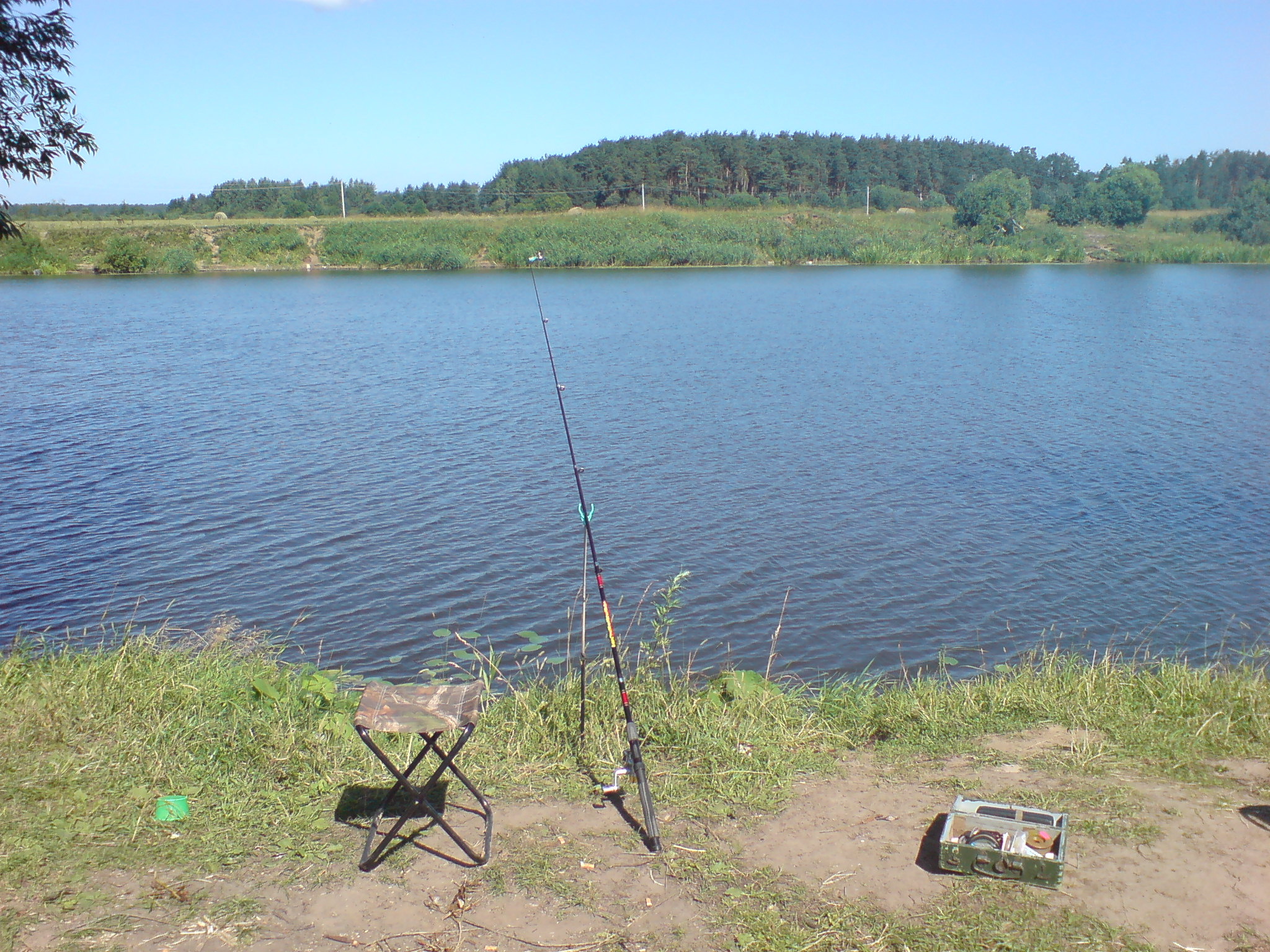
- Dubna river near its confluence with the Volga
- Native name: Дубна (Russian)

Location
- Country: Russia

Physical characteristics
- Mouth: Volga
  - coordinates: 56°47′04″N 37°14′34″E
- Length: 167 km (104 mi)
- Basin size: 5,350 km^{2} (2,070 sq mi)

Basin features
- Progression: Volga→ Caspian Sea

The Dubna (Russian: Дубна) is a river in Vladimir Oblast and Moscow Oblast in Russia, a right tributary of the Volga. The length of the river is 167 kilometres. The area of its basin is 5,350 km². Its largest tributary is the Sestra. The town of Dubna is located at the confluence of the Dubna and Volga rivers.
