= Aleksino =

Aleksino may refer to one of the following Russian locations:

- Aleksino, Istrinsky District, Moscow Oblast, a village in Istrinsky District of Moscow Oblast, Russia
- Aleksino, Naro-Fominsky District, Moscow Oblast, a village in Naro-Fominsky District of Moscow Oblast, Russia
- Aleksino, Ruzsky District, Moscow Oblast, a village in Ruzsky District of Moscow Oblast, Russia
- Aleksino, Bezhanitsky District, Pskov Oblast, a village in Bezhanitsky District of Pskov Oblast, Russia
- Aleksino, Dedovichsky District, Krasnogorskaya Volost, Pskov Oblast, a village in Krasnogorskaya Volost of Dedovichsky District of Pskov Oblast, Russia
- Aleksino, Dedovichsky District, Stankovskaya Volost, Pskov Oblast, a village in Stankovskaya Volost of Dedovichsky District of Pskov Oblast, Russia
- Aleksino, Loknyansky District, Pskov Oblast, a village in Loknyansky District of Pskov Oblast, Russia
- Aleksino, Opochetsky District, Pskov Oblast, a village in Opochetsky District of Pskov Oblast, Russia
- Aleksino, Plyussky District, Pskov Oblast, a village in Plyussky District of Pskov Oblast, Russia
- Aleksino, Pushkinogorsky District, Pskov Oblast, name of two villages in Pushkinogorsky District of Pskov Oblast, Russia
- Aleksino, Velikoluksky District, Pskov Oblast, a village in Velikoluksky District of Pskov Oblast, Russia
- Aleksino, name of several other rural localities in Russia
