= Sestra (Moscow Oblast) =

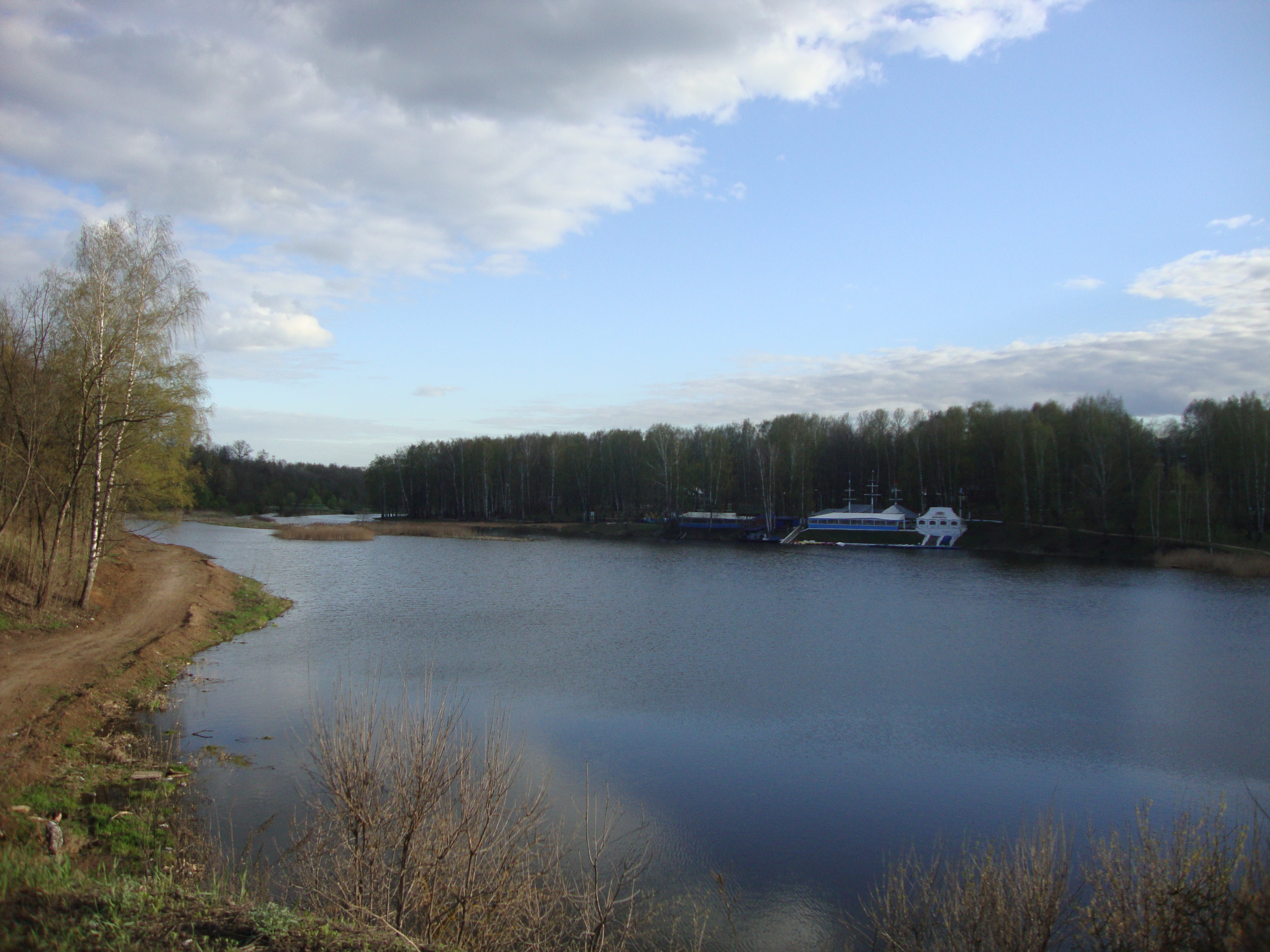
- Sestra in Klin
- Native name: Сестра (Russian)

Location
- Country: Russia

Physical characteristics
- Mouth: Dubna
  - coordinates: 56.707°N 37.2284°E
- Length: 138 km (86 mi)
- Basin size: 2,680 km^{2} (1,030 sq mi)

Basin features
- Progression: Dubna→ Volga→ Caspian Sea

The Sestra (Russian: Сестра́) is a river in Moscow Oblast, Russia. It is a left tributary of the Dubna (Volga basin). Its source is the Senezh Lake. The length of the river is 138 km (86 mi). The area of its basin is 2,680 km^{2} (1,030 sq mi). The river freezes over in November to early January and stays icebound until late March or April. Its main tributary is the Yakhroma. The town of Klin is located on the Sestra.
