= Lianozovo =

Lianozovo may refer to:

- Lianozovo (Moscow Metro), a railway station on the Moscow Metro
- Lianozovo District, an administrative district of North-Eastern Administrative Okrug, Moscow, Russia
