= Okruzhnaya =

Okruzhnaya (Russian: Окружная) may refer to:

- Okruzhnaya (Lyublinsko-Dmitrovskaya line)
- Okruzhnaya (Moscow Central Circle)
- Okruzhnaya railway station
