= Verkhniye Likhobory =

Moscow Metro station

Verkhniye Likhobory Верхние Лихоборы
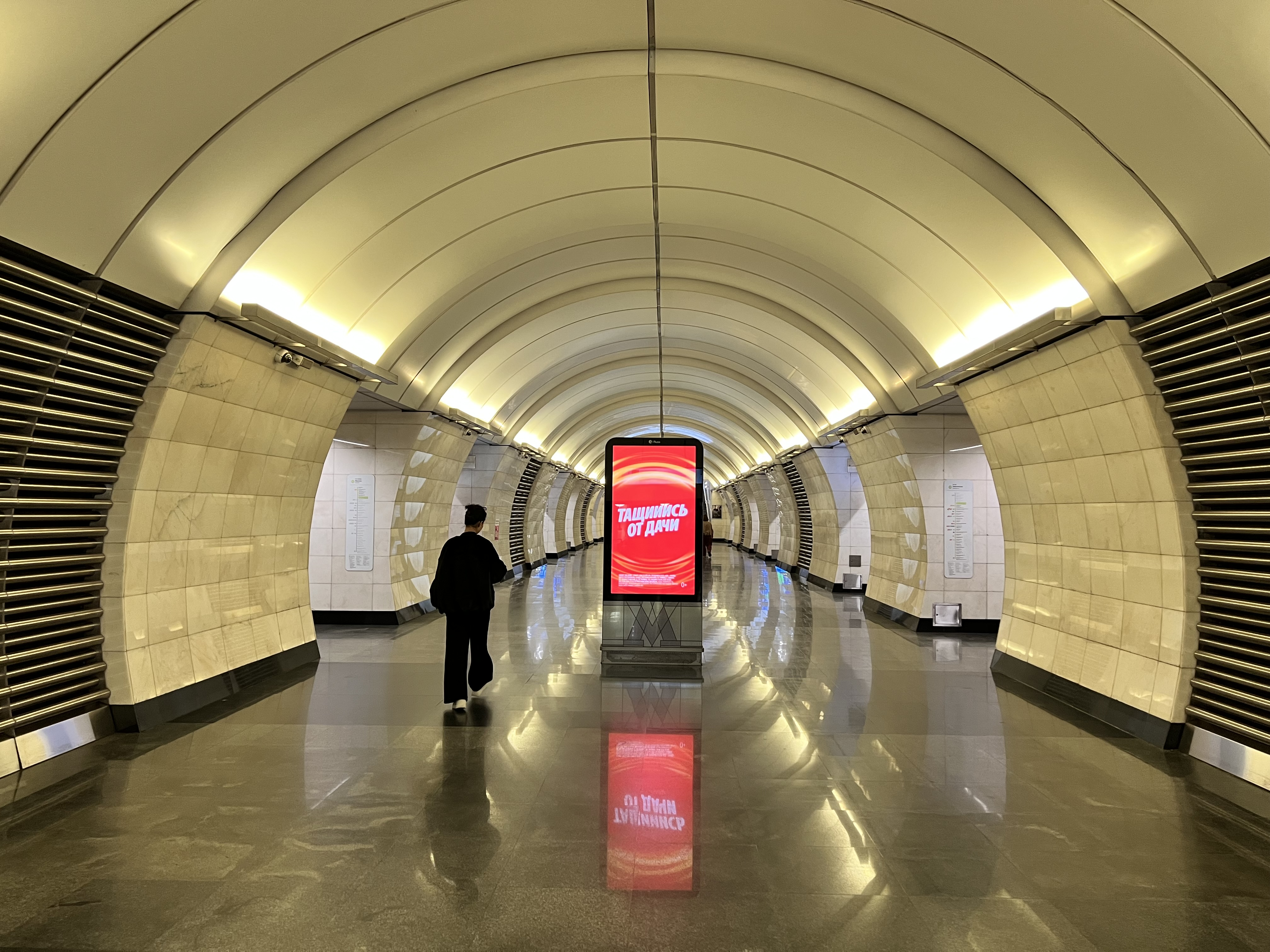
- Central hall of station

General information
- Location: Beskudnikovsky District; Zapadnoye Degunino District; Northern Administrative Okrug; Moscow; Russia
- Coordinates: 55.855833°N 37.561111°E
- System: Moscow Metro station
- Owner: Moskovsky Metropoliten
- Line: Lyublinsko-Dmitrovskaya line
- Platforms: 1 Island platform
- Tracks: 2

Construction
- Structure type: Deep pylon station
- Platform levels: 1

History
- Opened: 22 March 2018

Services
Preceding station	Moscow Metro	Following station
Seligerskaya towards Fiztekh	Lyublinsko-Dmitrovskaya line	Okruzhnaya towards Zyablikovo
Route map
Location
- Location within Moscow Metro

Verkhniye Likhobory (Russian: Верхние Лихоборы, lit. Upper Likhobory) is a station on the Lyublinsko-Dmitrovskaya line of the Moscow Metro between Okruzhnaya and Seligerskaya stations.

The extension of the Lyublinsko-Dmitrovskaya line between Petrovsko-Razumovskaya and Seligerskaya, including Verkhniye Likhobory opened on 22 March 2018. The station is in the Beskudnikovsky and Zapadnoye Degunino Districts of Moscow, at the T-crossing of Beskudnikovsky Boulevard and Dmitrovskoye Highway. A rail yard will be constructed next to the station.
