= Okruzhnaya (Lyublinsko-Dmitrovskaya line) =

Moscow Metro station

Coordinates: 55.84639°N 37.57361°E

Okruzhnaya Окружная
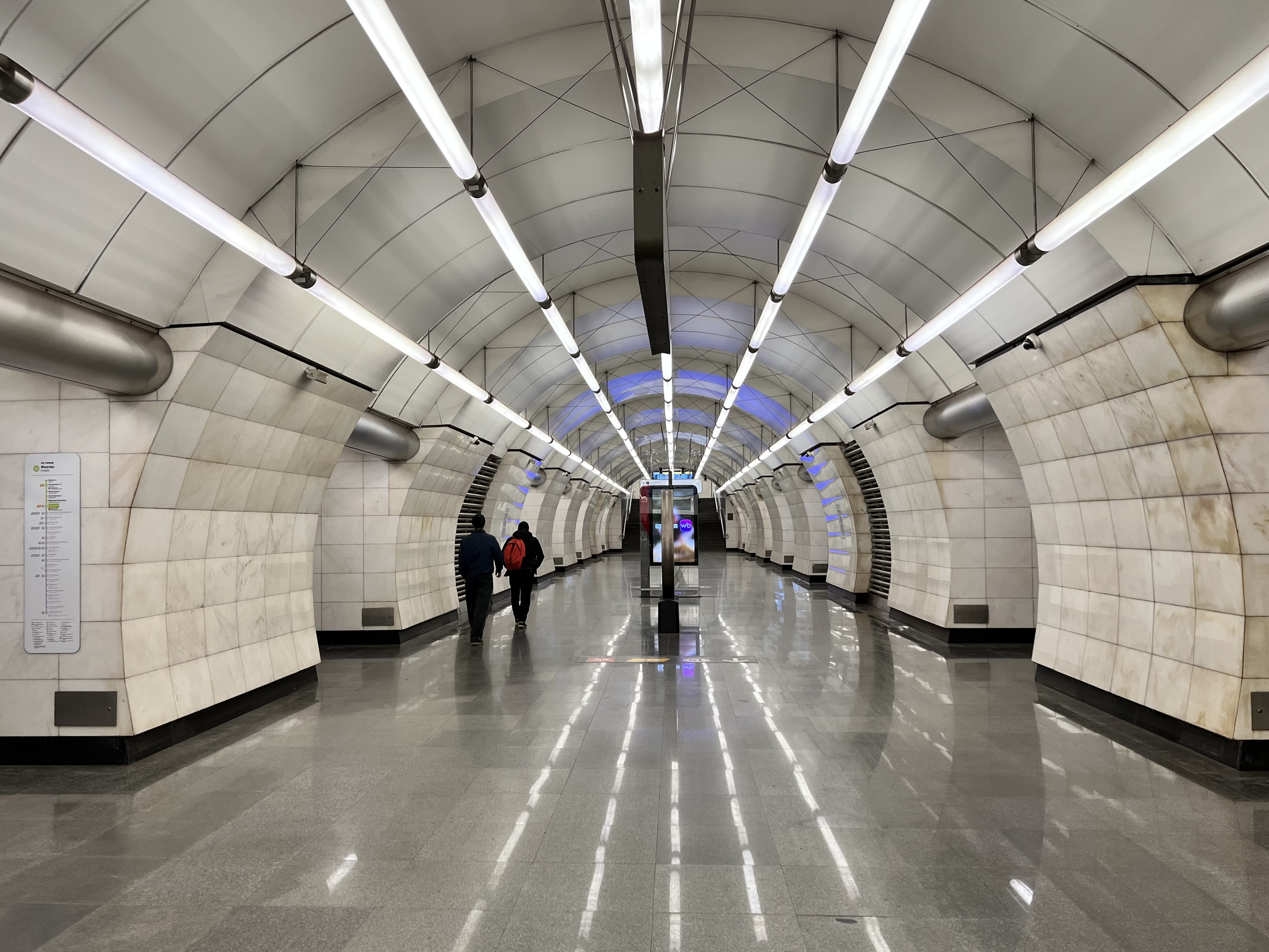

General information
- Location: Timiryazevsky District; Northern Administrative Okrug; Moscow; Russia
- System: Moscow Metro station
- Operator: Moscow Metro
- Line: Lyublinsko-Dmitrovskaya line
- Platforms: 1
- Tracks: 2

Construction
- Structure type: Deep pylon station

History
- Opened: 22 March 2018

Services
Preceding station	Moscow Metro	Following station
Verkhniye Likhobory towards Fiztekh	Lyublinsko-Dmitrovskaya line	Petrovsko-Razumovskaya towards Zyablikovo
Out-of-station interchange
Preceding station	Moscow Metro	Following station
Likhobory anticlockwise / outer	Moscow Central Circle transfer at Okruzhnaya	Vladykino clockwise / inner
Route map
Location
- Location within Moscow Metro

Okruzhnaya (Russian: Окружная) is a station on the Lyublinsko-Dmitrovskaya line of the Moscow Metro between Petrovsko-Razumovskaya and Verkhniye Likhobory. The extension of the Lyublinsko–Dmitrovskaya line between Petrovsko-Razumovskaya and Seligerskaya, including Okruzhnaya opened on 22 March 2018. The station is in Timiryazevsky District of Moscow, at the intersection of Lokomotivny Lane and Tretiy Nizhnelikhoborsky Lane.

== Transfers ==
Transfers to the Okruzhnaya station of the Moscow Central Circle and to the Okruzhnaya railway station of D1 available.
