= Yakhromskaya =

Prospective Moscow Metro station

Yakhromskaya Яхромская
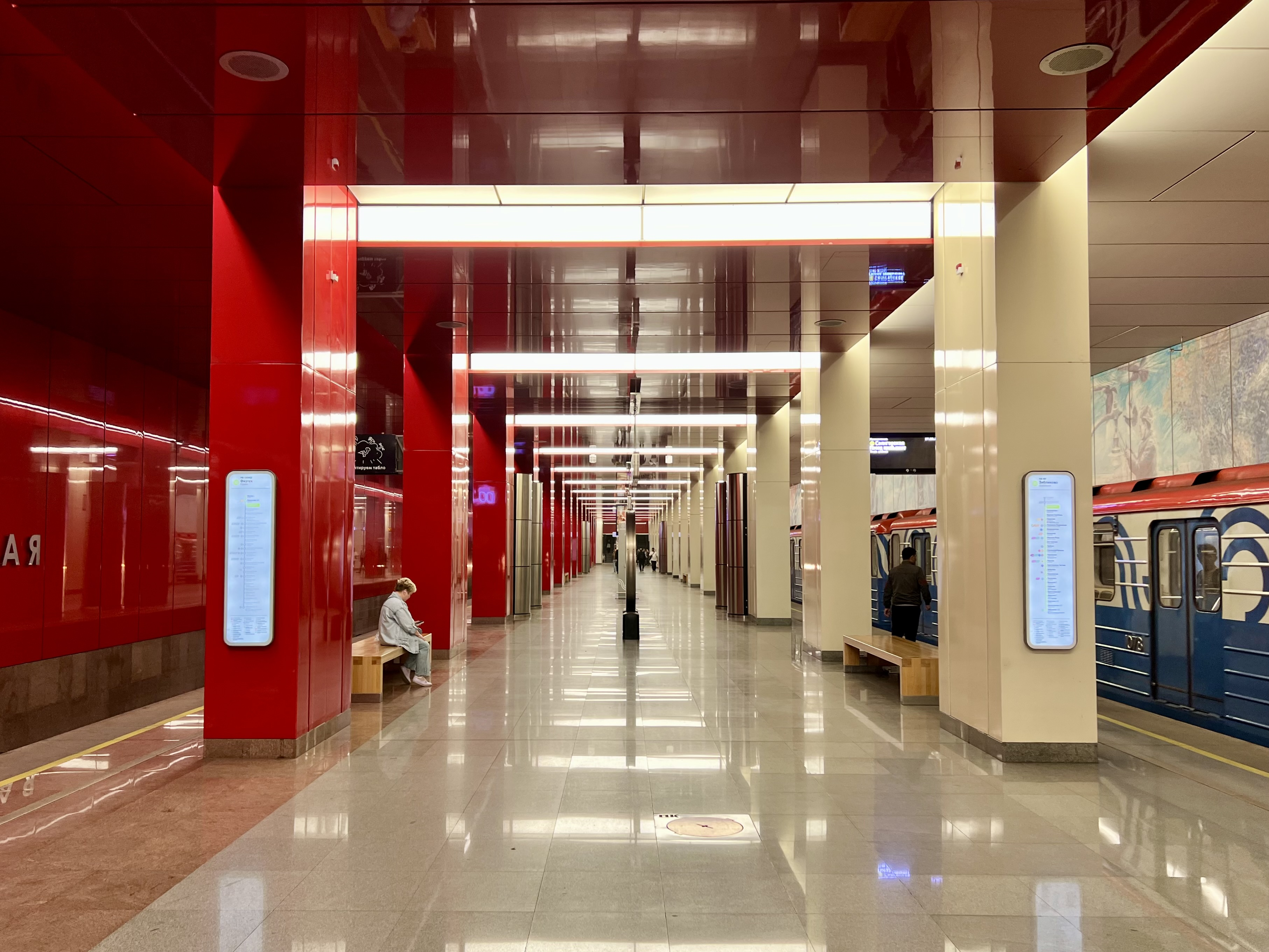

General information
- Location: Dmitrovsky and Vostochnoye Degunino Districts, SAO; Moscow; Russia
- Coordinates: 55°52′47″N 37°32′44″E
- System: Moscow Metro station
- Owner: Moskovsky Metropoliten
- Line: Lyublinsko-Dmitrovskaya line
- Platforms: 1 island platform

History
- Opened: 7 September 2023
- Former names: Ulitsa 800-letiya Moskvy

Services
Preceding station	Moscow Metro	Following station
Lianozovo towards Fiztekh	Lyublinsko-Dmitrovskaya line	Seligerskaya towards Zyablikovo
Route map
Location
- Location within Moscow Metro

Yakhromskaya (Russian: Яхромская) is a station of the Line 10 (Lyublinsko-Dmitrovskaya) of Moscow Metro in the far north of Moscow, Russia. It was previously known as Ulitsa 800-letiya Moskvy (Russian: Улица 800-летия Москвы, romanized: Ulitsa vosmisotletiya Moskvy, "800th anniversary of Moscow Street"). Opened on the 7 September 2023 together with Lianozovo and Fiztekh stations to the north. Yakhromskaya is a column two-span shallow station with one island platform.

== Location ==
Yakromskaya station is located under Dmitrovskoye Highway Initially, the station was supposed to be built south of the intersection of Dmitrovskoye Highway and 800th Anniversary of Moscow St., but because of the cancellation of Dmitrovskoye Shosse station, now it is planned to build Yakromskaya north of this intersection, between 800th Anniversary Street and Yakhromsky Drive.
