= Seligerskaya =

Moscow Metro station

Seligerskaya Селигерская
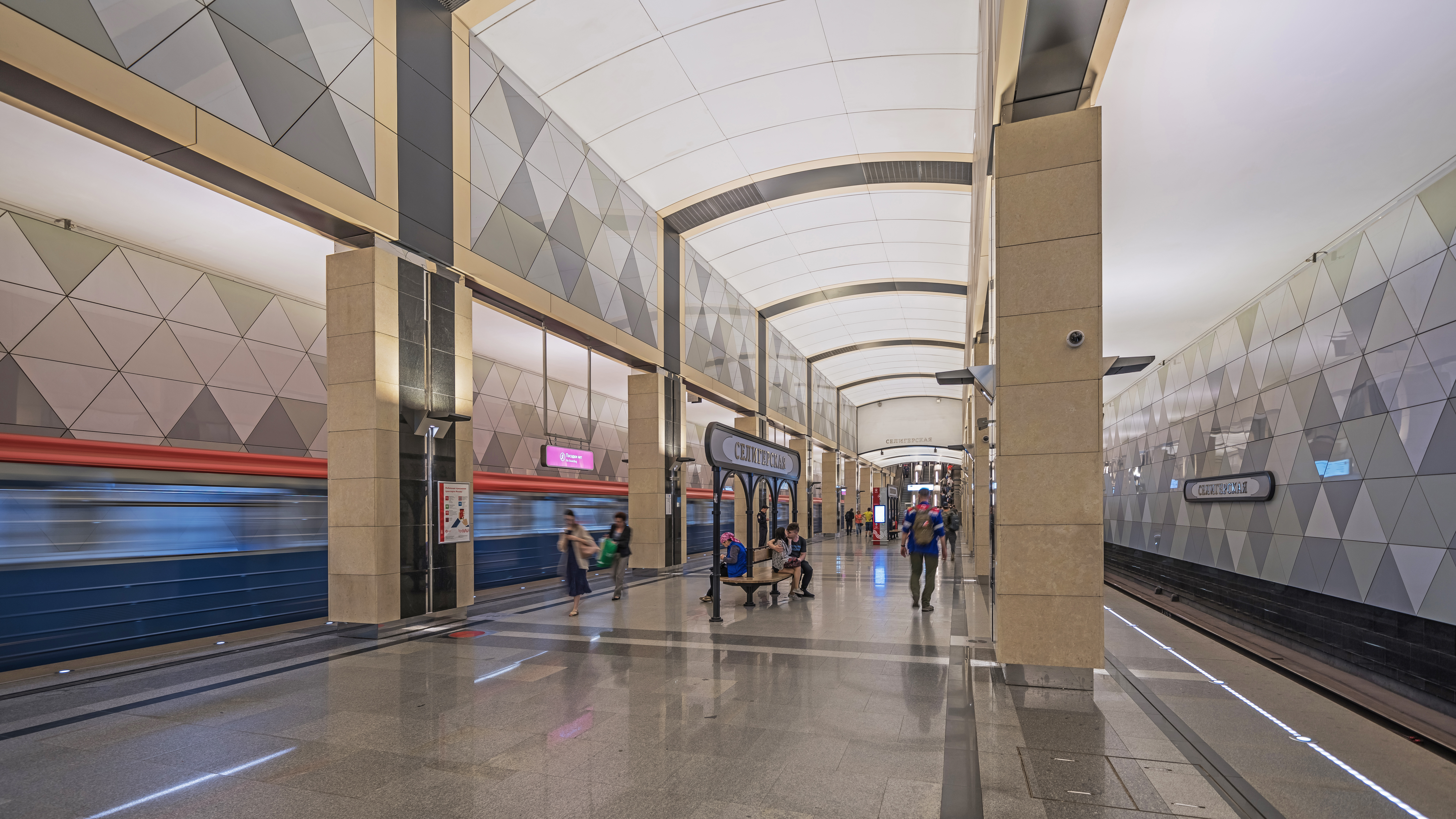

General information
- Location: Beskudnikovsky District; Northern Administrative Okrug; Moscow; Russia
- Coordinates: 55°51′54″N 37°32′54″E
- System: Moscow Metro station
- Owner: Moskovsky Metropoliten
- Line: Lyublinsko-Dmitrovskaya line
- Platforms: Island platform
- Tracks: 2

Construction
- Structure type: Three-span shallow-column station
- Depth: 20 metres (66 ft)

History
- Opened: 22 March 2018

Services
| Preceding station | Moscow Metro | Following station |
|---|---|---|
| Yakhromskaya towards Fiztekh | Lyublinsko-Dmitrovskaya line | Verkhniye Likhobory towards Zyablikovo |
Route map
Location
- Location within Moscow Metro

Seligerskaya (Russian: Селигерская) is a station on the Lyublinsko-Dmitrovskaya line of the Moscow Metro. It is located between Yakhromskaya and Verkhniye Likhobory. The extension of the Lyublinsko-Dmitrovskaya line between Petrovsko-Razumovskaya and Seligerskaya opened on 22 March 2018. It is in Beskudnikovsky District of Moscow, close to the T-crossing of Korovinskoye Highway and Dmitrovskoye Highway.

It was opened as the northern terminus of the line and remained terminus until 7 September 2023 when the extension to Yakhromskaya, Lianozovo, and Fiztekh stations was opened.
