= Lianozovo (Moscow Metro) =

Planned Moscow Metro station, Line 10

Lianozovo Лианозово
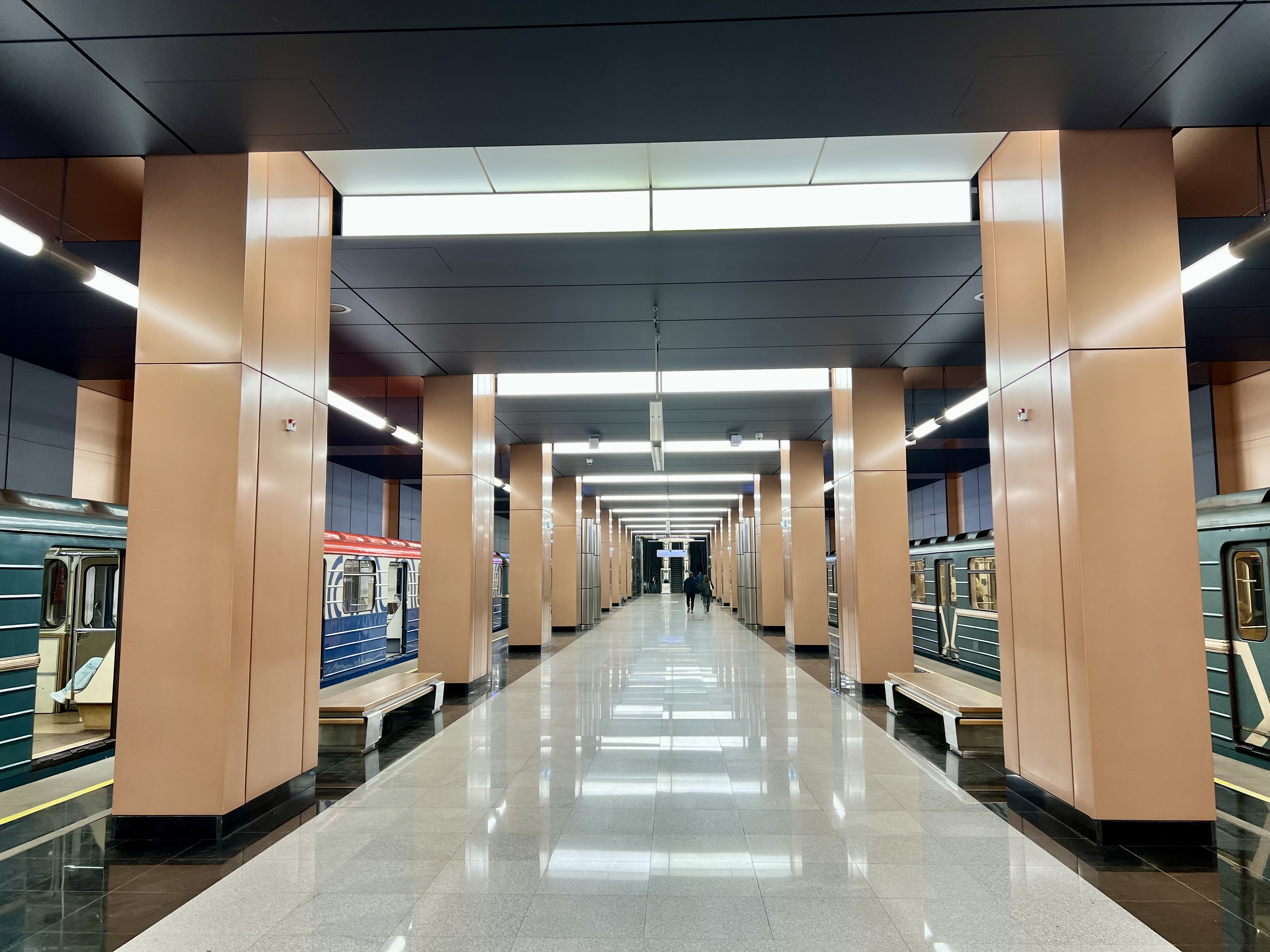

General information
- Location: Dmitrovsky District (Note: Though named after the nearby Lianozovo District, the station is actually located in Dmitrovsky District.); Northern Administrative Okrug; Moscow; Russia
- Coordinates: 55.8975°N 37.5445°E
- Line: Lyublinsko-Dmitrovskaya line

Services
Preceding station	Moscow Metro	Following station
Fiztekh Terminus	Lyublinsko-Dmitrovskaya line	Yakhromskaya towards Zyablikovo
Route map
Location
- Location within Moscow Metro

Lianozovo (Russian: Лиано́зово) is a station on the Lyublinsko-Dmitrovskaya line of the Moscow Metro, in the Dmitrovsky District, is located between the stations Fiztekh and Yakhromskaya. The station is, along with the nearby Lianozovo railway station, a part of a transport interchange hub that also serves Line D1 of the Moscow Central Diameters.

The station is designed as an enfilade, with alternating dark and light colors resembling chocolate and coffee. The floor made of light gray granite, whilst the station's ceiling, walls, and 46 columns are covered with metal panelling.

The station is one of 14 Moscow Metro stations opened in 2023. (Note: Of the 14 stations, 3 are on the Lyublinsko-Dmitrovskaya line.) Lianozovo was opened on 7 September 2023, together with adjacent stations Fiztekh and Yakhromskaya. The station's main structural elements were completed by January.

== Gallery ==
Construction site in 2021

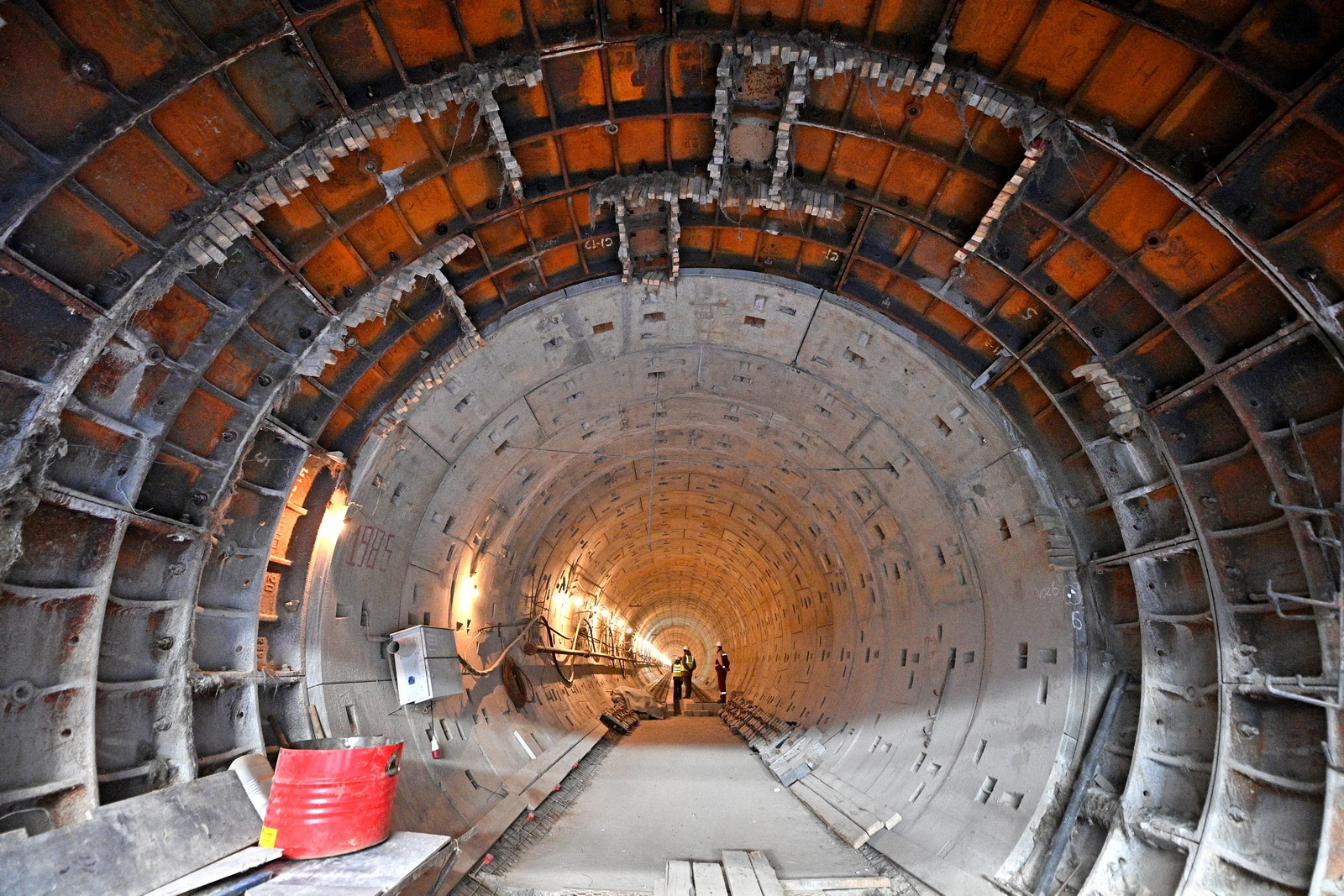
Tunnel under construction, 2022

Platform under construction, 2022
