= Crocus City =

Shopping mall near Moscow, Russia

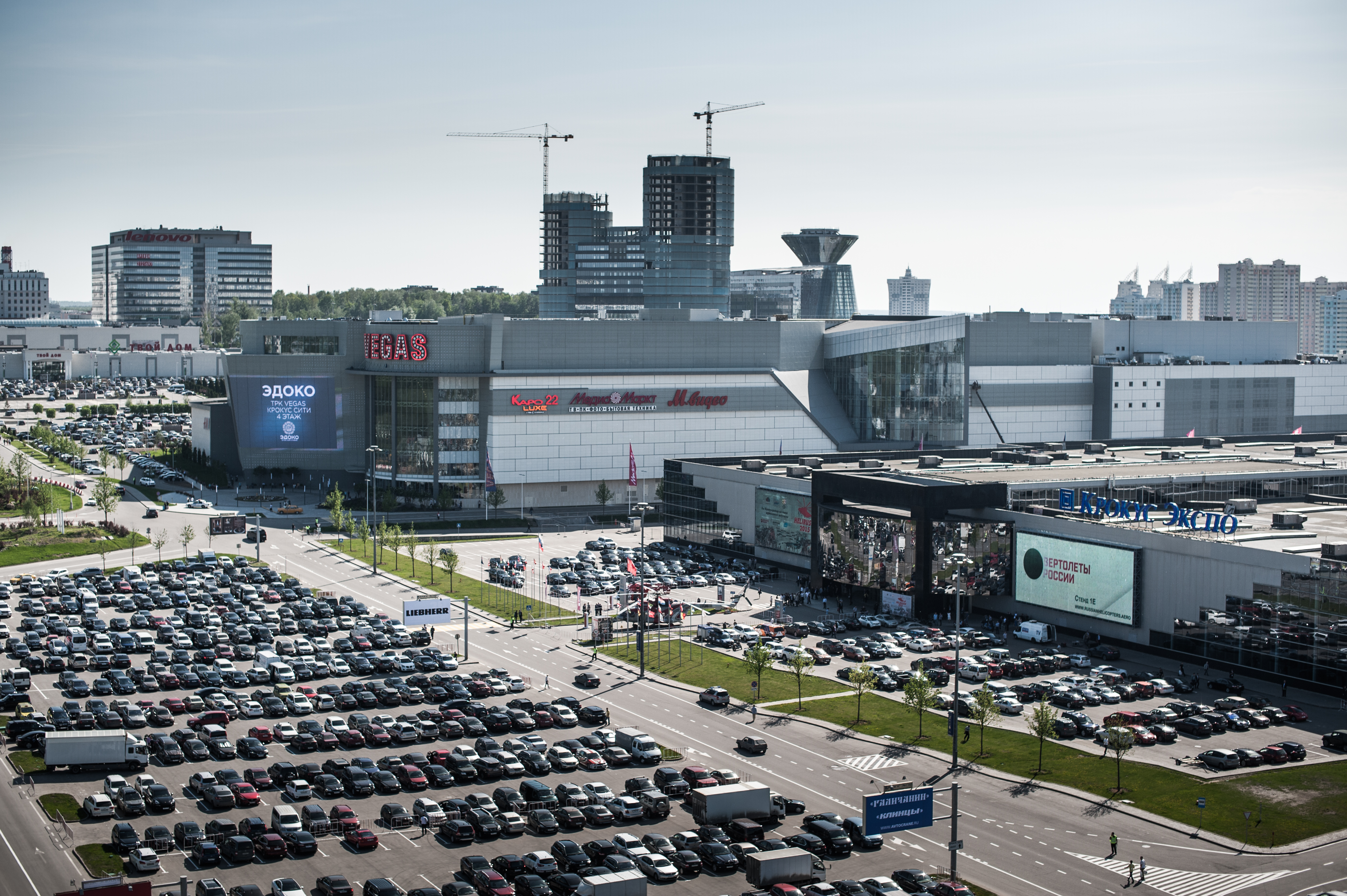
Crocus Expo and Vegas Crocus City Mall in 2015

Crocus City is an exhibition and business complex located in Krasnogorsk with hotels, and restaurants.

== Development ==
Developed by Aras Agalarov's Crocus International, the site is located near the Moscow Oblast Administrative HQ, just outside Moscow's MKAD ring road.

== Complex ==
=== Crocus City Mall ===
Crocus City Mall is a shopping mall located in Crocus City. Built of natural stone in a mixture between neo-classical and oriental architectural styles, the two-storey building opened in 2002.

=== Crocus City Hall ===
==== 2024 terrorist attack ====
On March 22, 2024, the concert hall and its surrounding facilities were subjected to a coordinated terrorist attack by ISIS-K, where 151 people were killed and 609 others injured.

=== Crocus Expo ===
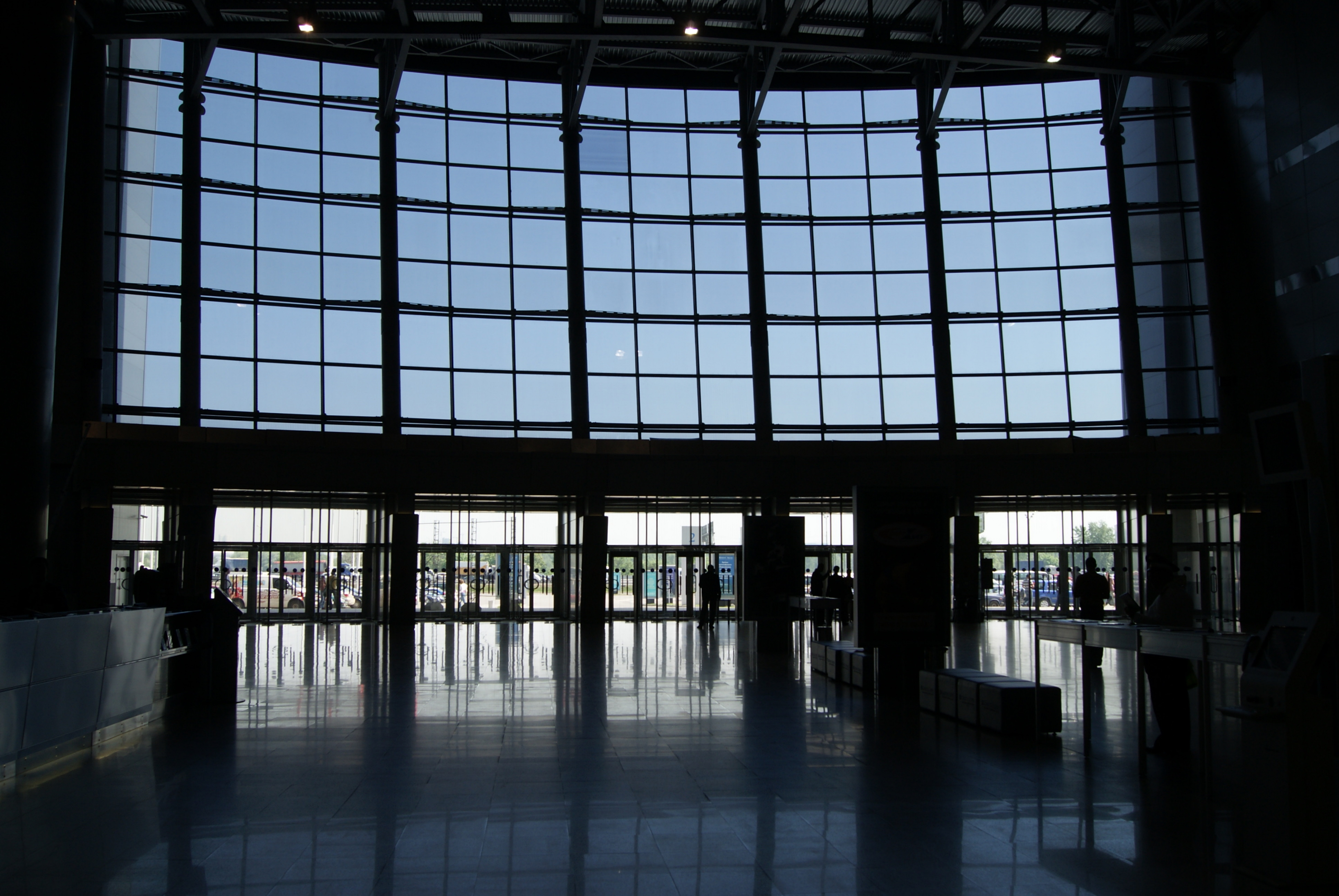
Crocus Expo front entrance, from the inside

Crocus Expo is the adjacently located trade fair and business centre, also built, run and operated by Crocus International. It is the largest business centre in Russia.

From 2011 to 2019, Crocus hosted an annual video game exhibition Igromir, which was moved there from VDNKh exhibition center due to an increasing number of visitors. Over a hundred thousand visitors had attended Igromir in Crocus each year.

In 2014, Crocus Expo also hosted the first Comic-Con Russia.

In 2016 it received a bomb threat via phone call which caused its evacuation. Crocus City Hall received similar threats a year later.

=== Vegas Crocus City ===
Vegas Crocus City is a shopping mall located in Crocus City.

=== Crocus City Oceanarium ===
Crocus City Oceanarium is an Oceanarium located in Crocus City.

== Transport ==
The Crocus Group paid for the Moscow Metro railway station at Myakinino to be additionally planned and built on the extension of the Arbatsko-Pokrovskaya Line, located between Volokolamskaya and Strogino stations. Myakinino opened on 26 December 2009. It was the first station to be built outside Moscow.
