= Mitino =

Mitino may refer to:

- Mitino District
- Mitino (Moscow Metro)
