= Strogino =

Strogino may refer to:

- Strogino District, a district of North-Western Administrative Okrug of Moscow, Russia
- Strogino (Arbatsko-Pokrovskaya line), a station on the Arbatsko-Pokrovskaya line of the Moscow Metro, Moscow, Russia
- Strogino (rural locality), a rural locality (a village) in Pskov Oblast, Russia
