= Volokolamskaya (Moscow Metro) =

Moscow Metro station

Volokolamskaya Волоколамская
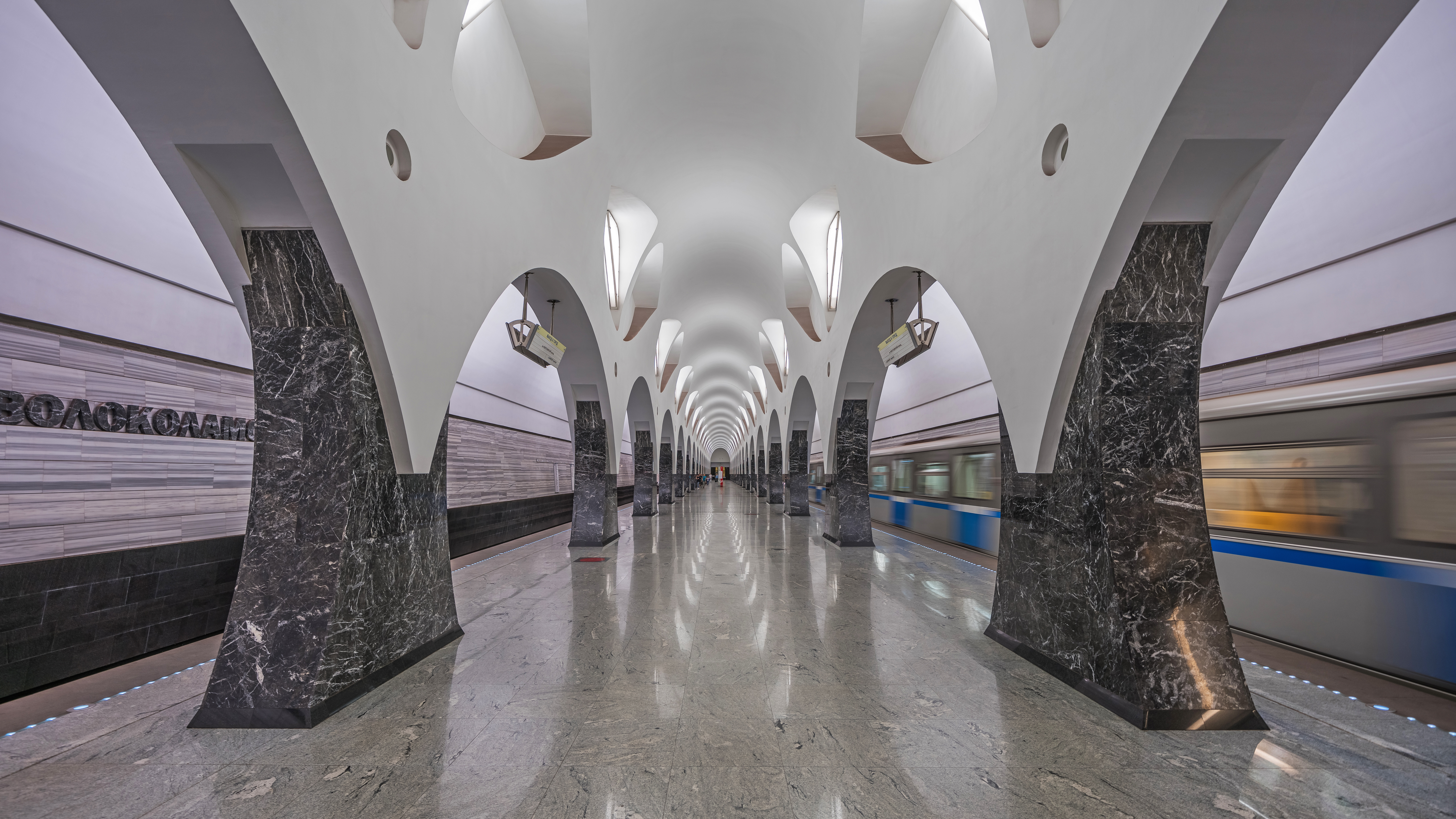

General information
- Location: Novotushinskaya Street; Mitino District; North-Western Administrative Okrug; Moscow; Russia
- Coordinates: 55.8354°N 37.3822°E
- System: Moscow Metro station
- Owner: Moskovsky Metropoliten
- Line: Arbatsko-Pokrovskaya line
- Platforms: 1 island platform
- Tracks: 2
- Connections: Bus: 248, 736, 741, 837

Construction
- Structure type: Shallow column tri-vault
- Depth: 14 metres (46 ft)
- Platform levels: 1
- Parking: Yes
- Accessible: Yes

History
- Opened: 26 December 2009; 16 years ago

Passengers
- 2009: 2,554,635

Services
Preceding station	Moscow Metro	Following station
Mitino towards Pyatnitskoye Shosse	Arbatsko-Pokrovskaya line	Myakinino towards Shchyolkovskaya
Route map
Location
- Location within Moscow Metro

Volokolamskaya (Russian: Волоколамская) is a Moscow Metro station in Mitino District, North-Western Administrative Okrug, Moscow. It is on the Arbatsko-Pokrovskaya Line, between Mitino and Myakinino stations. It was opened on 26 December 2009.

== Gallery ==
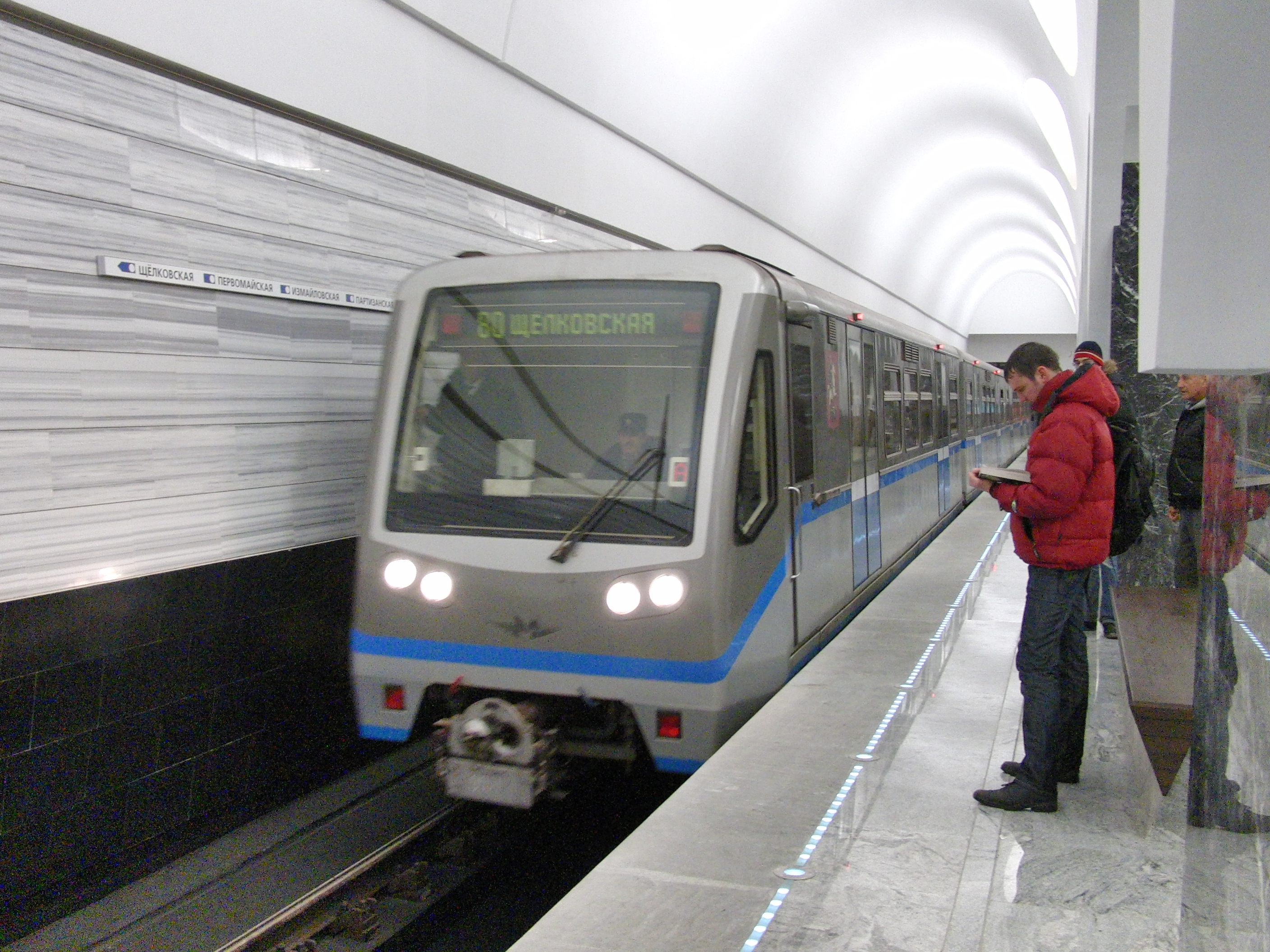
Platform with incoming train
