= Kurskaya (Arbatsko-Pokrovskaya line) =

Moscow Metro station

Kurskaya Курская
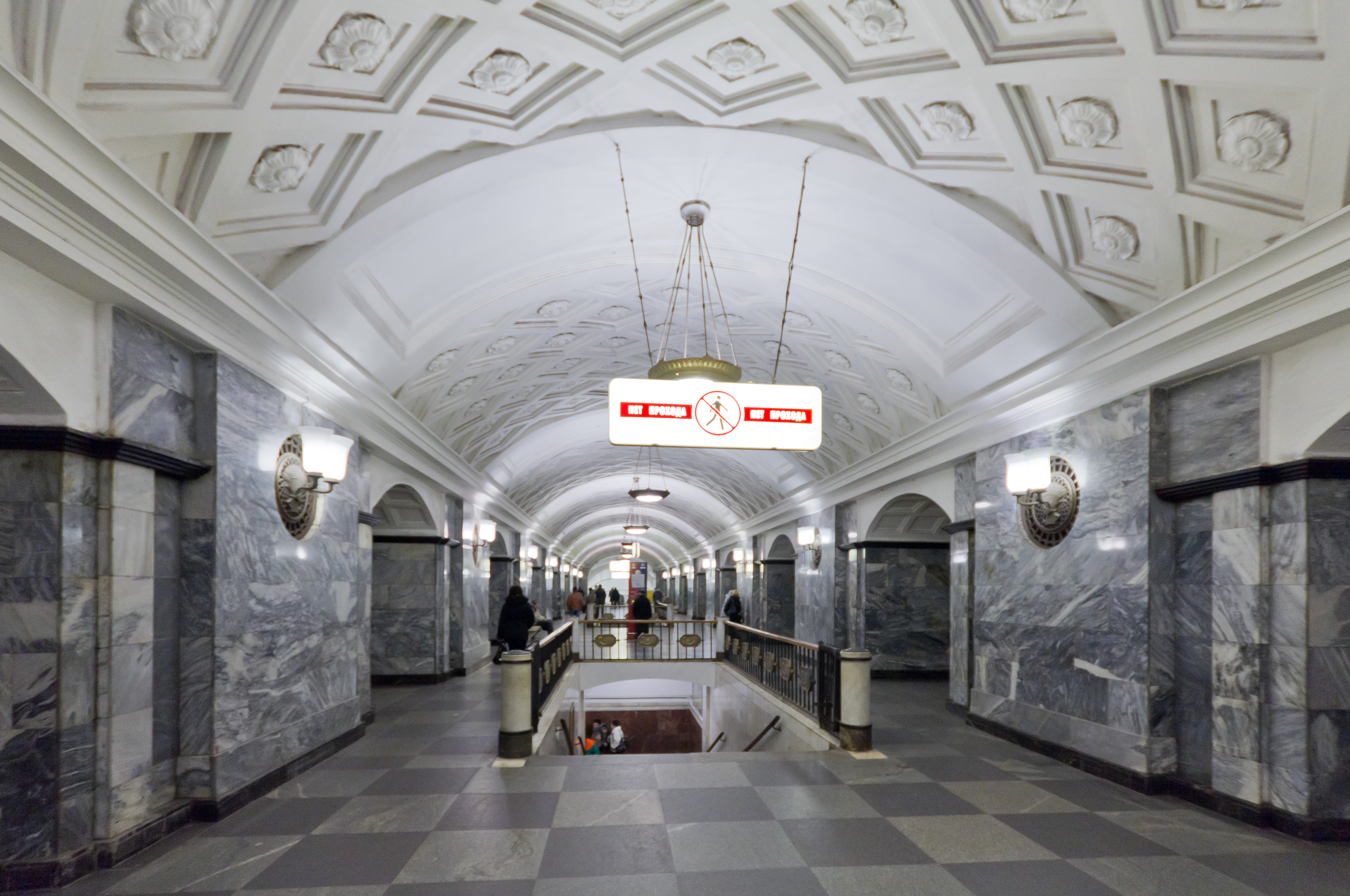

General information
- Location: Kursky railway station square Basmanny District; Central Administrative Okrug; Moscow; Russia
- Coordinates: 55.7576°N 37.6577°E
- System: Moscow Metro station
- Owner: Moskovsky Metropoliten
- Line: Arbatsko-Pokrovskaya line
- Platforms: 1 island platform
- Tracks: 2
- Connections: Bus: B, Bk, 40, 78; Tram: B, 20, 24

Construction
- Structure type: Pylon station
- Depth: 30.7 metres (101 ft)
- Platform levels: 1
- Parking: No

Other information
- Station code: 046

History
- Opened: 13 March 1938; 88 years ago

Services
Preceding station	Moscow Metro	Following station
Ploshchad Revolyutsii towards Pyatnitskoye Shosse	Arbatsko-Pokrovskaya line	Baumanskaya towards Shchyolkovskaya
Komsomolskaya anticlockwise / outer	Koltsevaya line transfer at Kurskaya	Taganskaya clockwise / inner
Sretensky Bulvar towards Fiztekh	Lyublinsko-Dmitrovskaya line transfer at Chkalovskaya	Rimskaya towards Zyablikovo
Route map
Location
- Location within Central Moscow

Kurskaya (Russian: Курская) is a station on the Arbatsko–Pokrovskaya line of the Moscow Metro.

== Name ==
It is named for the Kursky railway station located nearby.

== Building ==
Designed by L. M. Polyakov and completed in 1938, the station has tiled walls and gray marble pylons with sconce light fixtures and circular ventilation grilles.

== Transfers ==
From this station it is possible to transfer to Kurskaya on the Koltsevaya line and Chkalovskaya on the Lyublinskaya line.

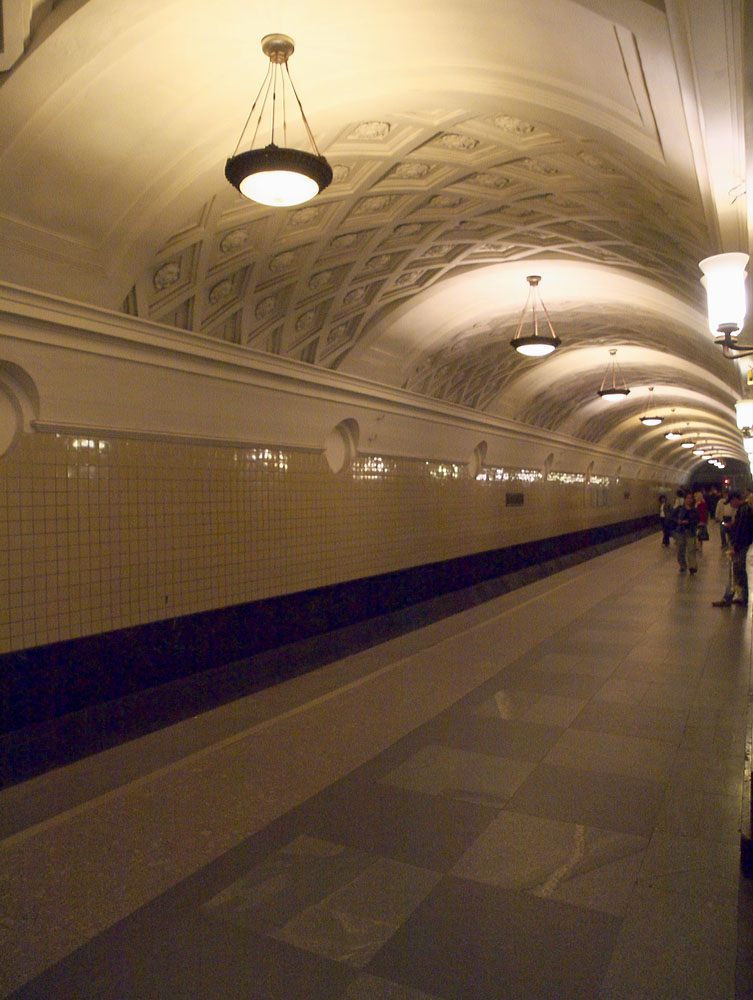
Station platform of Kurskaya
