= Strogino (Arbatsko-Pokrovskaya line) =

Moscow Metro station

Strogino Строгино
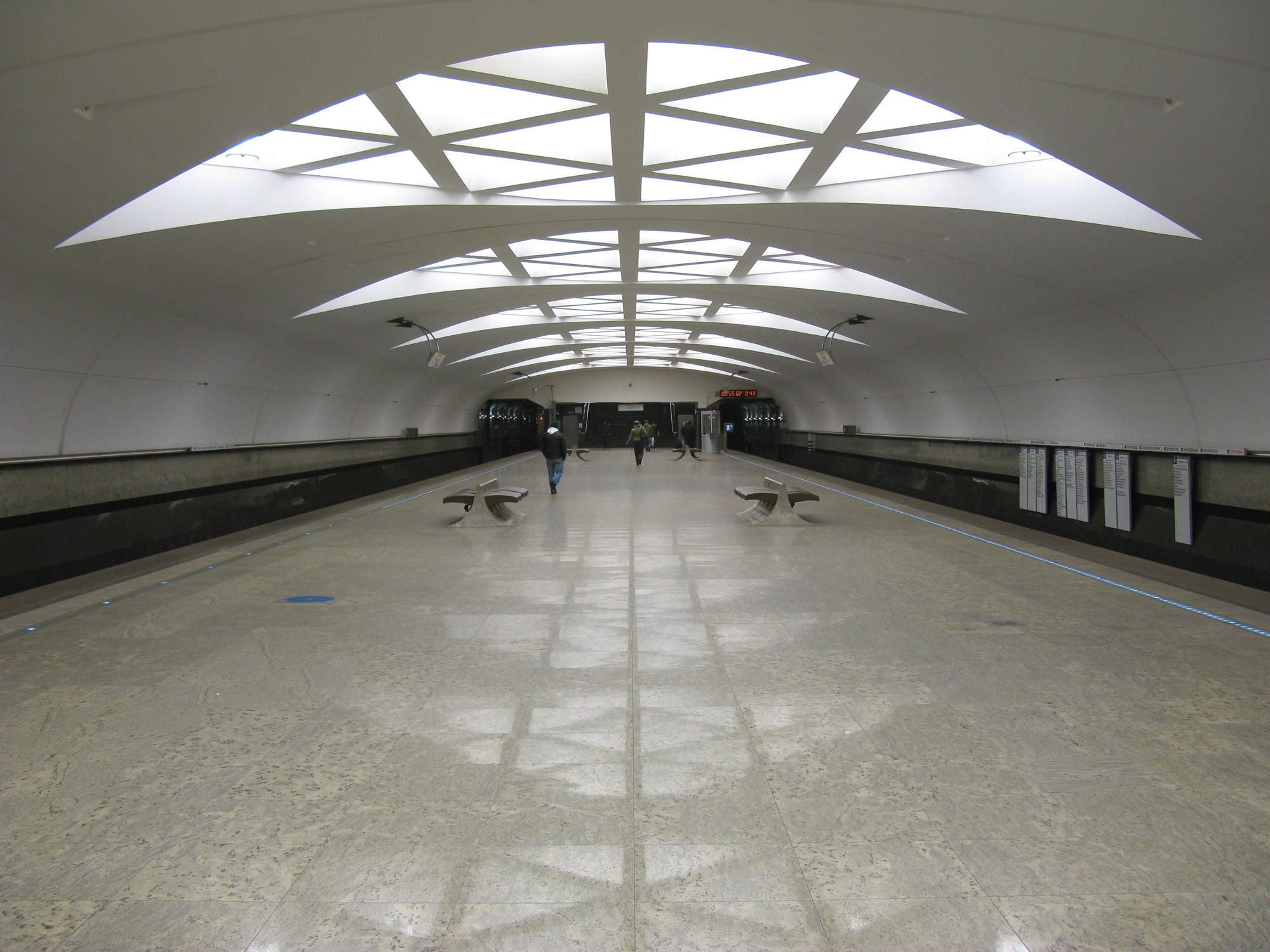

General information
- Location: Stroginsky Boulevard; Strogino District; North-Western Administrative Okrug; Moscow; Russia
- Coordinates: 55.8038°N 37.4031°E
- System: Moscow Metro station
- Owner: Moskovsky Metropoliten
- Line: Arbatsko-Pokrovskaya line
- Platforms: 1 island platform
- Tracks: 2
- Connections: Bus: 654, 743, 736, 652; Tram: 10, 15, 21, 30

Construction
- Structure type: Shallow single-vault
- Depth: 8 metres (26 ft)
- Platform levels: 1
- Parking: Yes
- Accessible: Yes

Other information
- Station code: 211

History
- Opened: 7 January 2008; 18 years ago

Passengers
- 2009: 12,008,135

Services
Preceding station	Moscow Metro	Following station
Myakinino towards Pyatnitskoye Shosse	Arbatsko-Pokrovskaya line	Krylatskoye towards Shchyolkovskaya
Route map
Location
- Location within Moscow Metro

Strogino (Russian: Строгино́) is a Moscow Metro station in the Strogino District, North-Western Administrative Okrug, Moscow. It is on the Arbatsko-Pokrovskaya Line, between Myakinino and Krylatskoye stations. The station opened on 7 January 2008 as a part of a massive Strogino–Mitino extension, and used to be the terminus of the line until its extension to Mitino on 26 December 2009.

Originally planned as part of a massive chordal line, construction began in the late 1980s, but after major delays in finances work has stalled and was restarted much later, in 2004. The overall design, adopted by architects A. Orlov and A. Nekrasov is a shallow depth single vault. Running along its snow-white colour, is a set of wedges which contain 16 triangle-shaped caissons, each housing the lighting element, in shape of a giant droplet. The platform itself is covered in bright grey granite and contains a series of arrow-shaped benches made of wood with stainless steel markings.

The station contains two vestibules, both located under the Stroginsky Boulevard, although the opening of the Western one was postponed due to the delays of escalator contractor in Saint Petersburg. Both vestibules are connected to subways that lead to large glazed pavilions, located not far from the intersection with the Tallinskaya street (Eastern) and the Kulakova street (Western).

As the station was only the first stage of the extension, its terminus state was temporary, as the line continues northwestward to Mitino since December 2009. There were plans to make this station a cross-platform interchange with the Kalininskaya Line which would then take over the Mitino extension, and the terminus station of the Arbatsko-Pokrovskaya would revert to Strogino. The Rublyovo-Arkhangelskaya line will replace the original trace of the Kalininskaya Line, which however, is currently projected to be connected to the Solntsevsky radius.
