= Volokolamsky =

Volokolamsky (masculine), Volokolamskaya (feminine), or Volokolamskoye (neuter) may refer to:

- Volokolamsky District, a district of Moscow Oblast, Russia
- Volokolamskaya (Moscow Metro), a station on the Arbatsko-Pokrovskaya Line of the Moscow Metro
- Volokolamskaya, former name of Spartak, an unopened station on the Tagansko-Krasnopresnenskaya Line of the Moscow Metro
- Volokolamskaya, originally proposed name for Streshnevo (Moscow Central Circle)
