= Myakinino =

Myakinino may refer to several places:

- Myakinino (Moscow Metro), a station of the Moscow Metro
- Myakinino (Moscow), a village in Kuntsevo District of Moscow, Russia
