= Myakinino (Moscow Metro) =

Moscow Metro station

Myakinino Мякинино
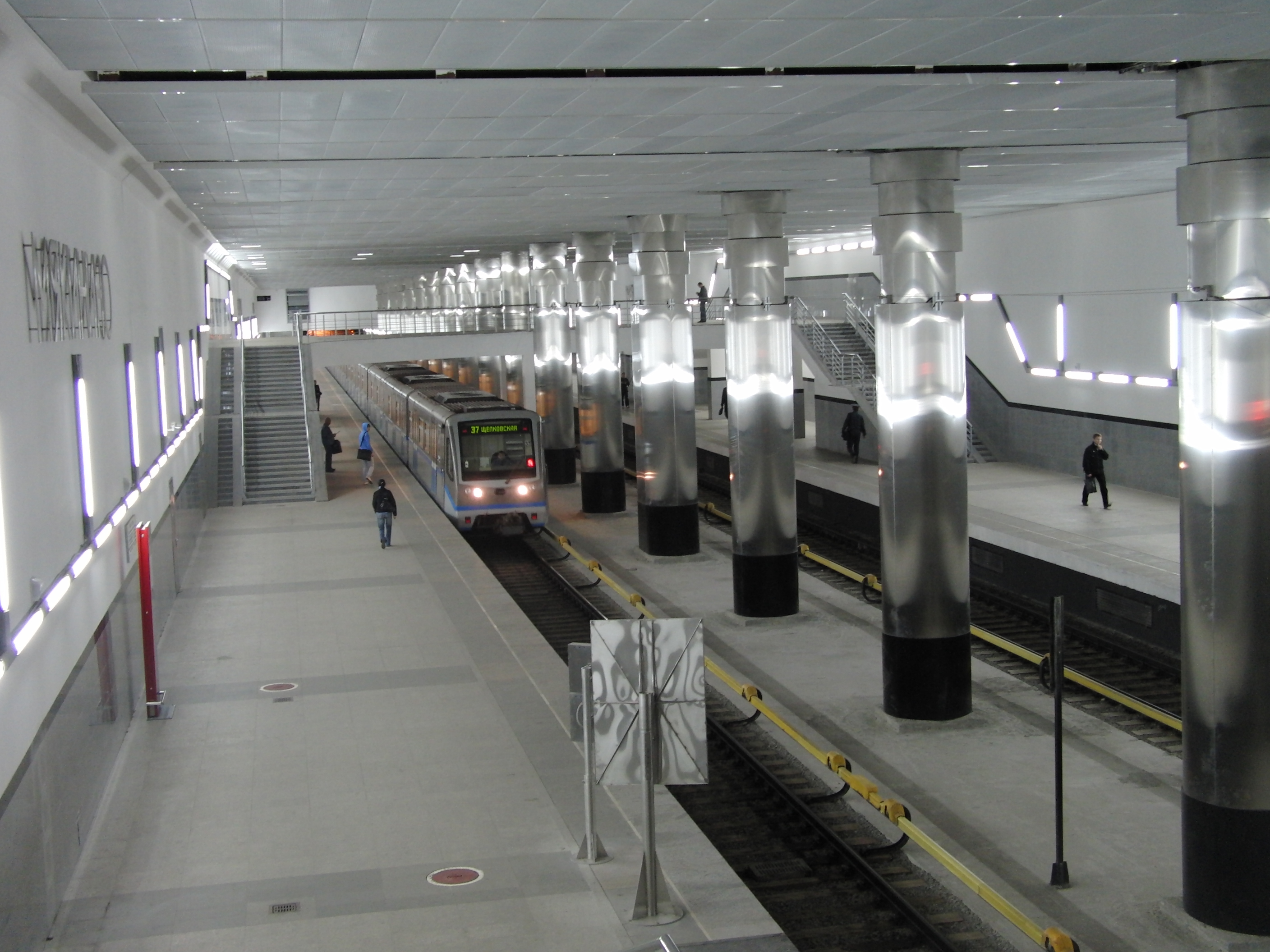

General information
- Location: Krasnogorsk City Okrug; Moscow Oblast; Russia
- Coordinates: 55.8252°N 37.3852°E
- System: Moscow Metro station
- Owner: Moskovsky Metropoliten
- Line: Arbatsko-Pokrovskaya line
- Platforms: 2 side platforms
- Tracks: 2

Construction
- Structure type: Ground level, covered, single-span
- Platform levels: 1
- Parking: No

History
- Opened: 26 December 2009; 16 years ago

Passengers
- 2009: 2,624,350

Services
| Preceding station | Moscow Metro | Following station |
|---|---|---|
| Volokolamskaya towards Pyatnitskoye Shosse | Arbatsko-Pokrovskaya line | Strogino towards Shchyolkovskaya |
Route map
Location
- Location within Moscow Metro

Myakinino (Russian: Мякининo) is a Moscow Metro station. It is a surface-level station on the Arbatsko-Pokrovskaya Line, between Volokolamskaya and Strogino stations. The station opened on 26 December 2009.

It is in Krasnogorsk, Moscow Oblast near the Moscow Oblast administrative headquarters and the Crocus City Mall and is the first station to be built outside the city of Moscow. It is also the first station in Moscow to be constructed under a public-private partnership.

== Financing ==
Financing to build the station came from Aras Agalarov’s Crocus Group, the developer of the nearby Crocus City Mall, Crocus Expo trade center, and the Crocus City Hall entertainment center. Agalarov sought to connect his complex to Moscow via the metro and invested 600 million rubles ($20 million) to construct the station.

The agreement between Crocus and the city gave ownership of the station lobbies and entryways to Crocus, while the Metro controlled everything below the escalators. This situation ultimately led to a dispute between the parties on how to pay for maintenance and required security upgrades. In 2016, Metro notified the public that it would close the station as a result of the lack of security.

Agalarov stated that he would be willing to hand ownership of the station to the Metro to allow it to make the required upgrades and prevent closure of the station. Crocus is negotiating a deal with the city that would place control of the station under a lease with an unlimited term.

== History ==
The initial plan for the Strogino–Mitino extension did not include Myakinino. It was included in the plan after the start of construction and the decision to unite the Krylatskoye-Mitino section with the Arbatsko-Pokrovskaya Line.

At first, plans called for Myakinino to be a shallow single-span station with an island platform near the Moscow Oblast Administrative Complex. As part of the partnership with Crocus Group, the station was relocated to the parking garage of Crocus City Mall. With construction of the mall already underway, the logistics required the plan to change from an island platform to two side platforms. The construction of the tunnel from Strogino station (previously the terminus of the line) to Myakinino started in summer 2008.

== Name ==
The station was named after the former village of Myakinino, which is currently inside the administrative territory of Moscow City, inside Kuntsevo District, Western Administrative Okrug. The name was approved by the government of Moscow based on the recommendation of the city's commission on territorial units, streets and Metro stations.

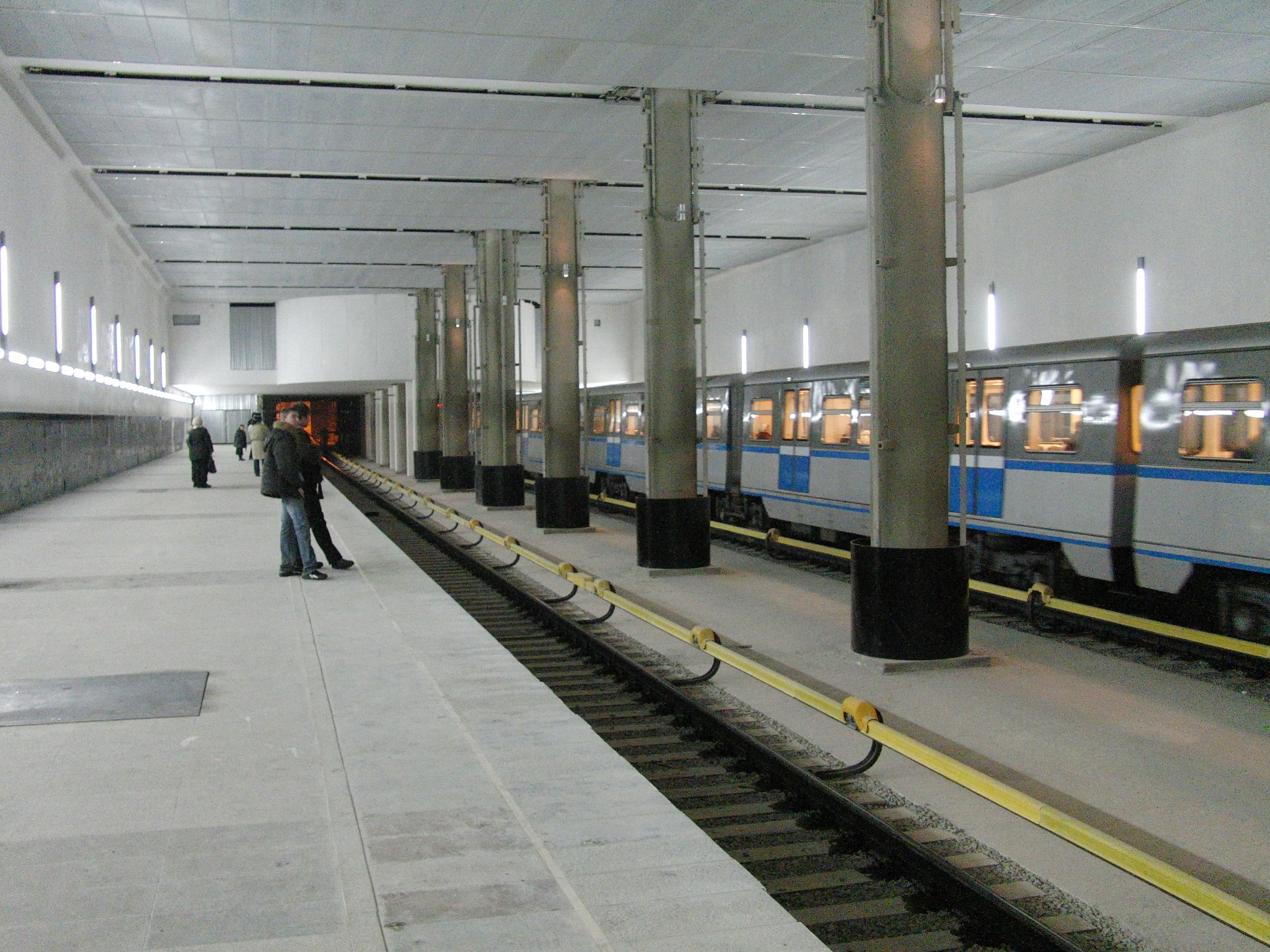
Station platform

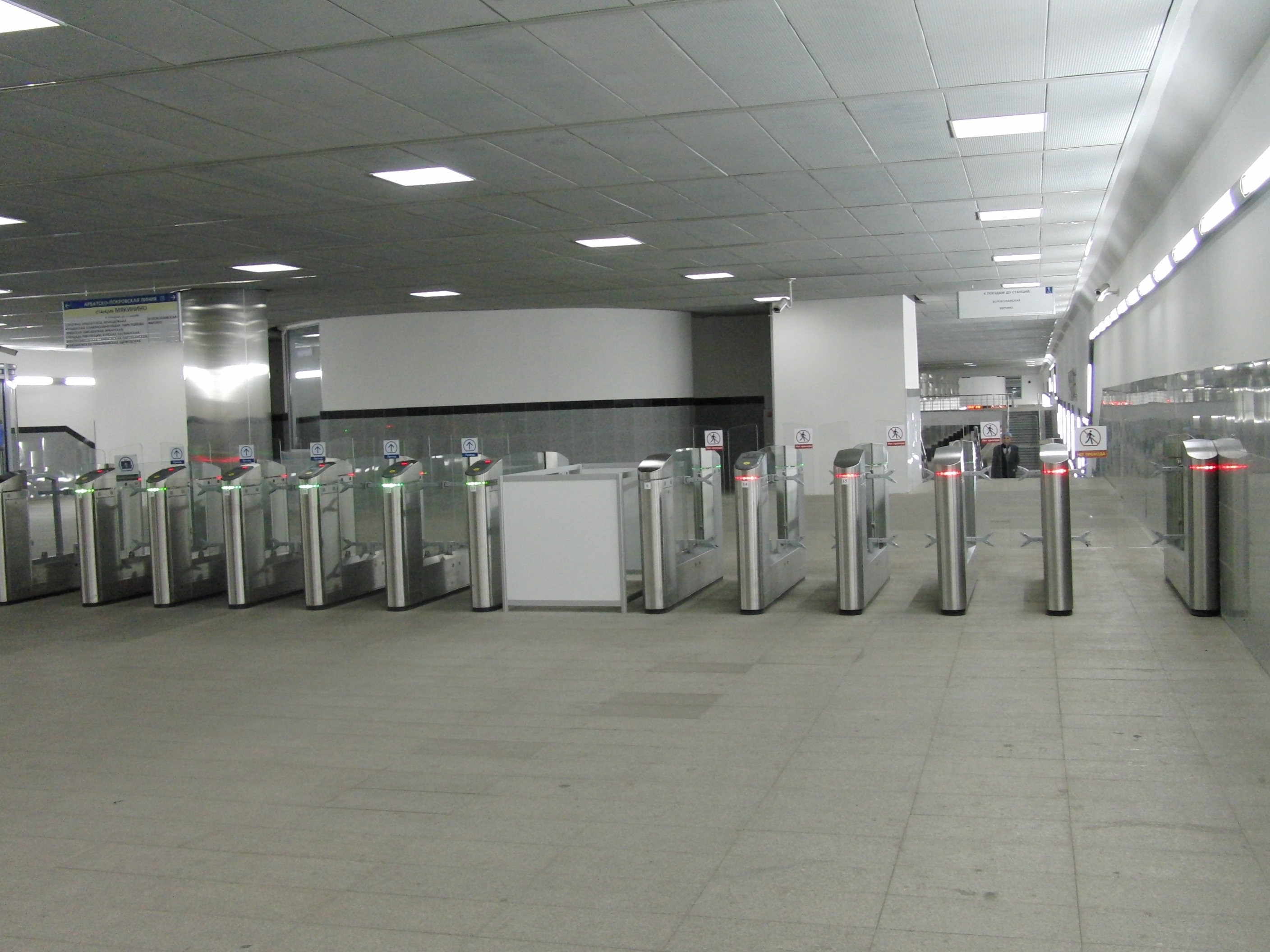
Turnstiles

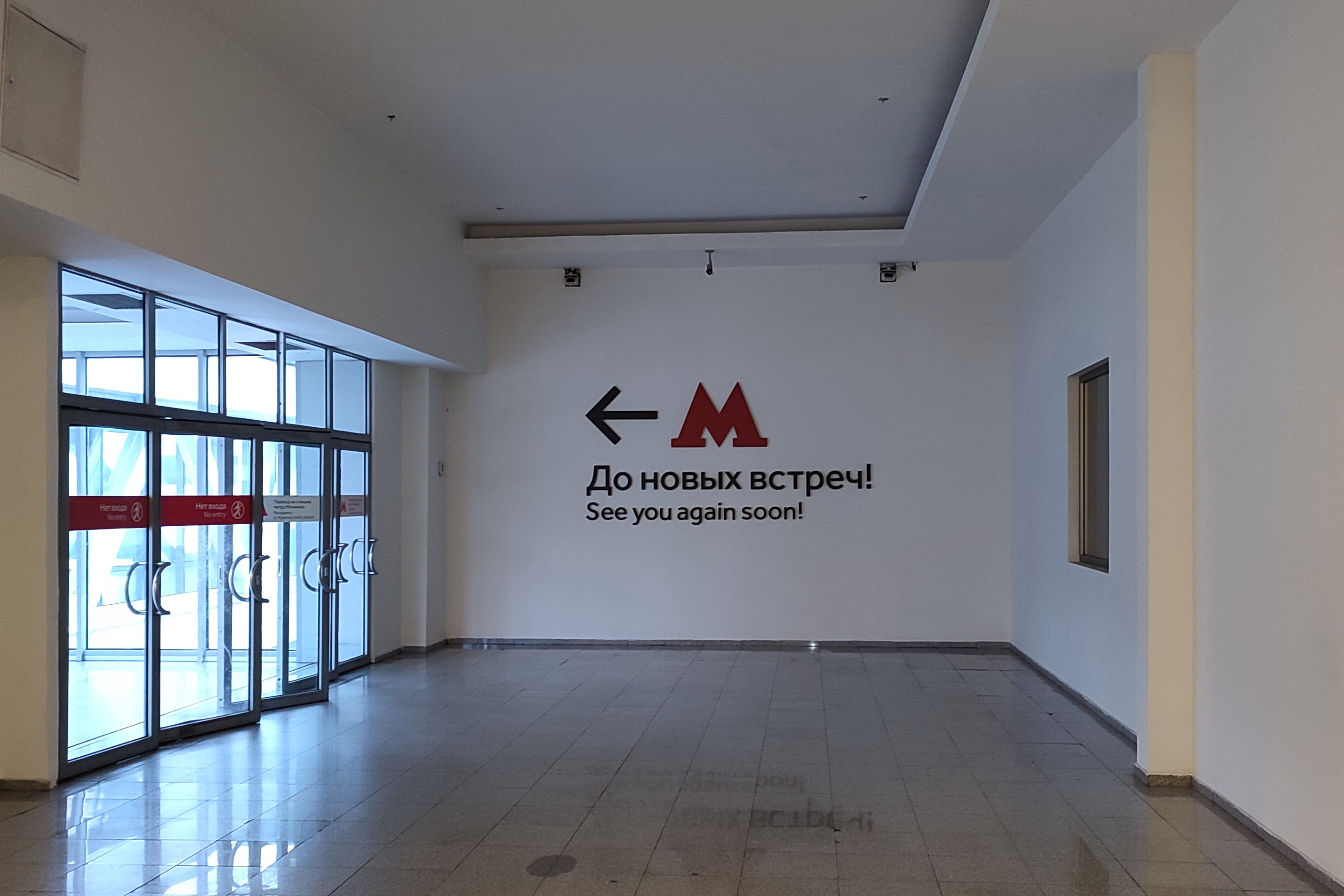
Entrance to Myakinino station from pavilion No.3 Crocus City
