= Krylatskoye (Moscow Metro) =

Moscow Metro station

Krylatskoye Крылатское
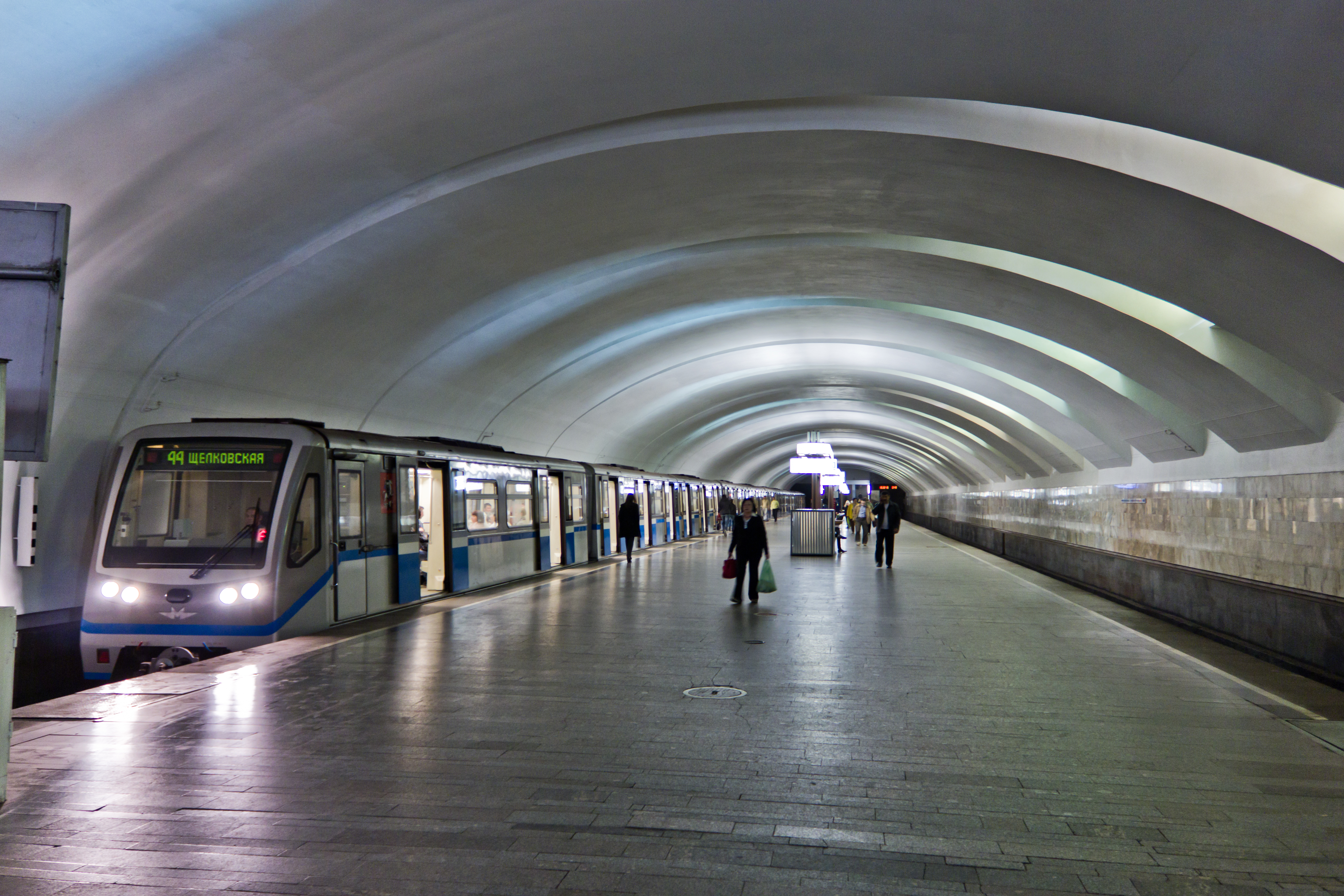

General information
- Location: Osenny Boulevard; Krylatskoye District; Western Administrative Okrug; Moscow; Russia
- Coordinates: 55.7567°N 37.4081°E
- System: Moscow Metro station
- Owner: Moskovsky Metropoliten
- Line: Arbatsko-Pokrovskaya line
- Platforms: 1 island platform
- Tracks: 2
- Connections: Bus: 129, 229, 251, 376, 554, 688, 732, 829, 832, 850, т19

Construction
- Structure type: Shallow single-vault
- Depth: 9.5 metres (31 ft)
- Platform levels: 1
- Parking: No

Other information
- Station code: 066

History
- Opened: 31 December 1989; 36 years ago

Passengers
- 2009: 13,369,220

Services
Preceding station	Moscow Metro	Following station
Strogino towards Pyatnitskoye Shosse	Arbatsko-Pokrovskaya line	Molodyozhnaya towards Shchyolkovskaya
Route map
Location
- Location within Moscow Metro

Krylatskoye (Russian: Крылатское) is a Moscow Metro station in the Krylatskoye District, Western Administrative Okrug, Moscow, Russia. It is on the Arbatsko-Pokrovskaya Line, between Strogino and Molodyozhnaya stations. Before 31 December 2008 it was the terminus of the Filyovskaya Line.

== Building ==
It is a shallow-level, vault-type station with a unique asymmetrical design. The curved ceiling rests on a white marble wall on one side of the platform, but on the other it reaches all the way down to the tracks. Wedge-shaped niches containing light fixtures run transversely across the ceiling, with the wide ends on the side with the wall. This has the effect of making one side of the platform brighter than the other. The decorative theme of the station is "gymnastics and sport".

Krylatskoe was designed by N. Shumakov, G. Mun, and A. Mosichuk. It opened in 1989.
