= Krylatskoye =

Krylatskoye may refer to:

- Krylatskoye District
- Krylatskoye (Moscow Metro)
- Krylatskoye Sports Palace, Moscow
- Ice Palace Krylatskoye, Moscow
