= Strogino District =

Strogino Строгино (Russian)
- District
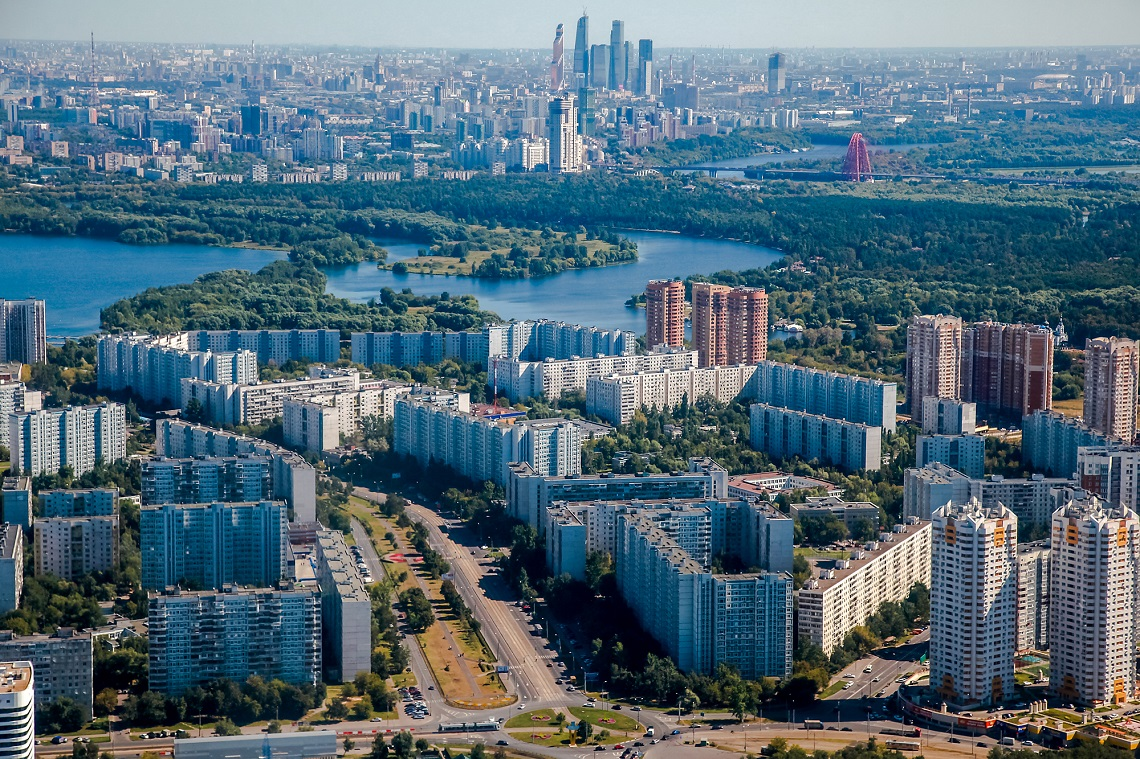
- Tallinskaya Street in Strogino

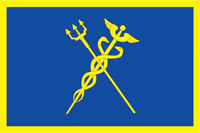
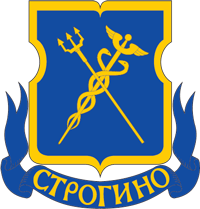
- Flag Coat of arms
- Location of Strogino District on the map of Moscow
- Coordinates: 55°47′N 37°23′E
- Country: Russia
- Federal subject: Moscow

Area
  - Total: 18.643 km^{2} (7.198 sq mi)

Population
  - Estimate (2017): 152,500
- Time zone: UTC+
- OKTMO ID: 45370000
- Website: http://strogino.mos.ru/

Strogino (Russian: Строгино), formerly known as Ostrogino (Острогино), is a district in North-Western Administrative Okrug of Moscow, Russia, located on the right bank of the Moskva River about 12 km west-northwest of central Moscow. An eponymous Moscow Metro station Strogino on the Arbatsko-Pokrovskaya Line was opened here on January 7, 2008. The Moscow Ring Road runs down the western border, and the Moskva River borders the district on the north and east. The area of the district is 18.643 square kilometres (7.198 mi^{2}). Population: 152,500 (2017 est.)

== History ==
The district is named after an extinct village and known to have existed since the early 17th century as an estate of the Romanovs and later the Naryshkin family. Strogino was engulfed by Moscow in 1960 and became a popular summertime venue thanks to its beaches. In the 1970s, the construction of apartment buildings in the area was started, and a microdistrict was built. Stroginsky Boulevard (Строгинский бульвар) is the main artery of Strogino.

Soviet statesmen Mikhail Suslov and Konstantin Chernenko had a Gosdacha in the settlement Troitse-Lykovo (Троице-Лыково).

== Gallery ==
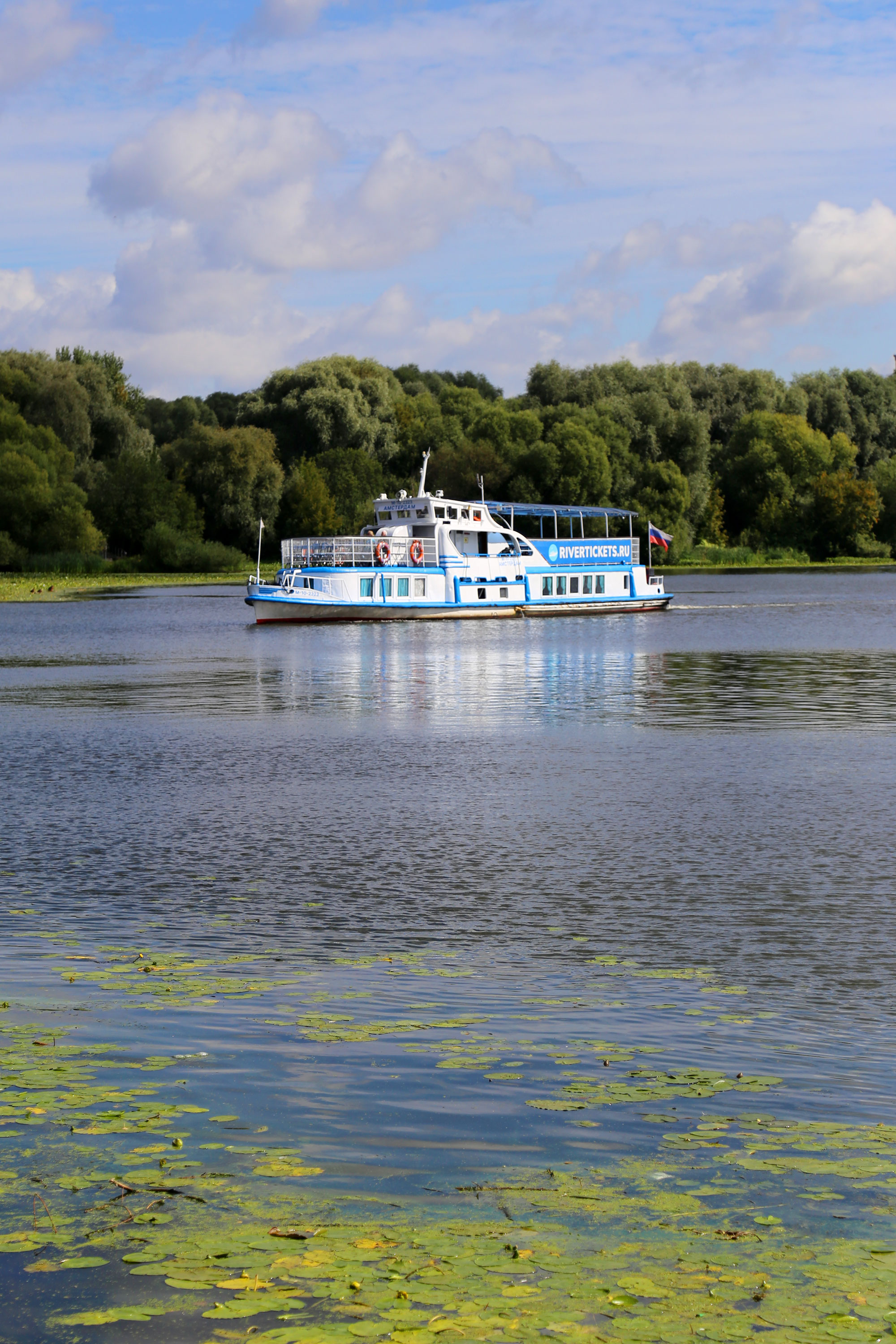
Pristan' V Troitse - Lykovo, Strogino, Moscow, Russia

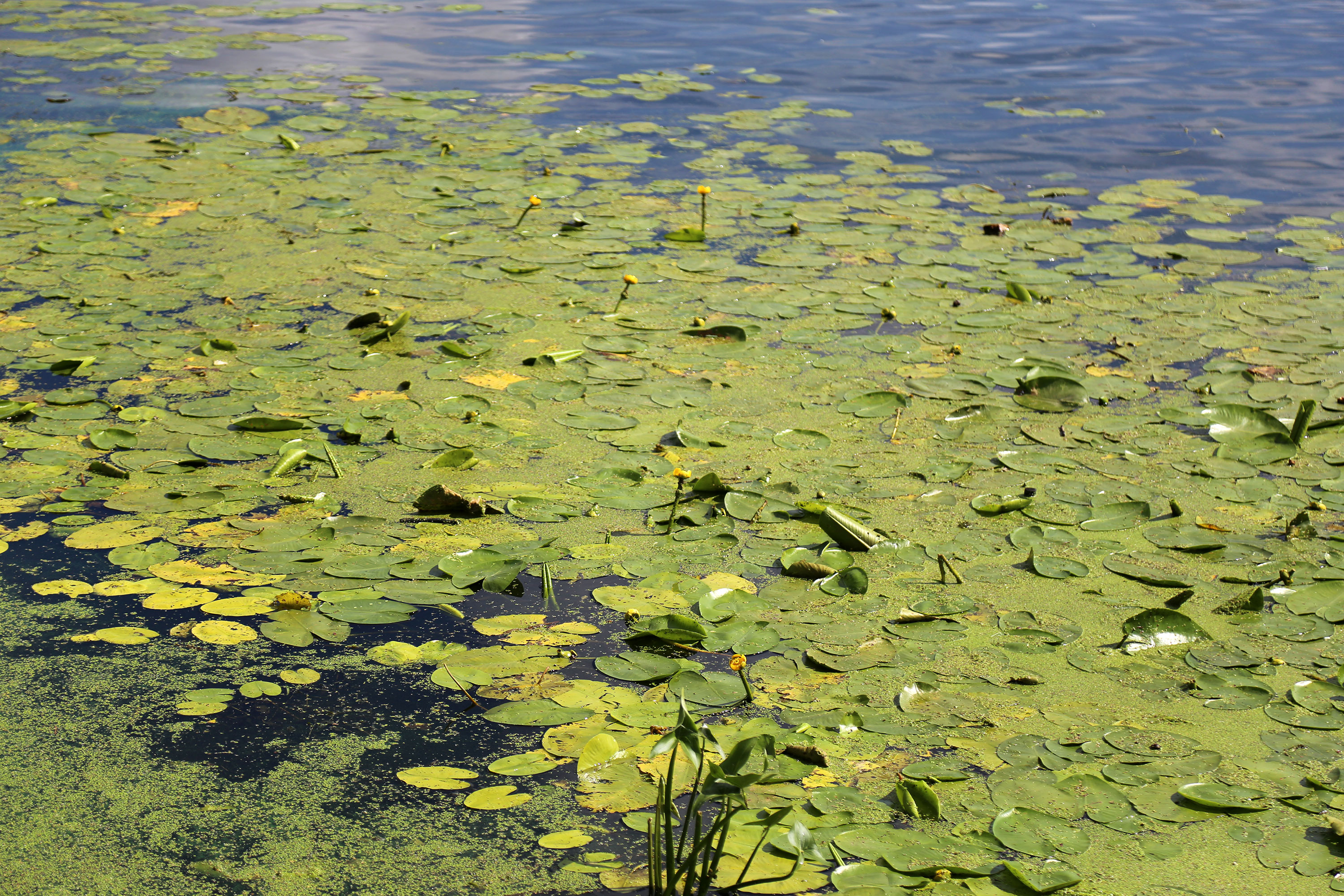
Pristan' V Troitse - Lykovo, Strogino, Moscow, Russia

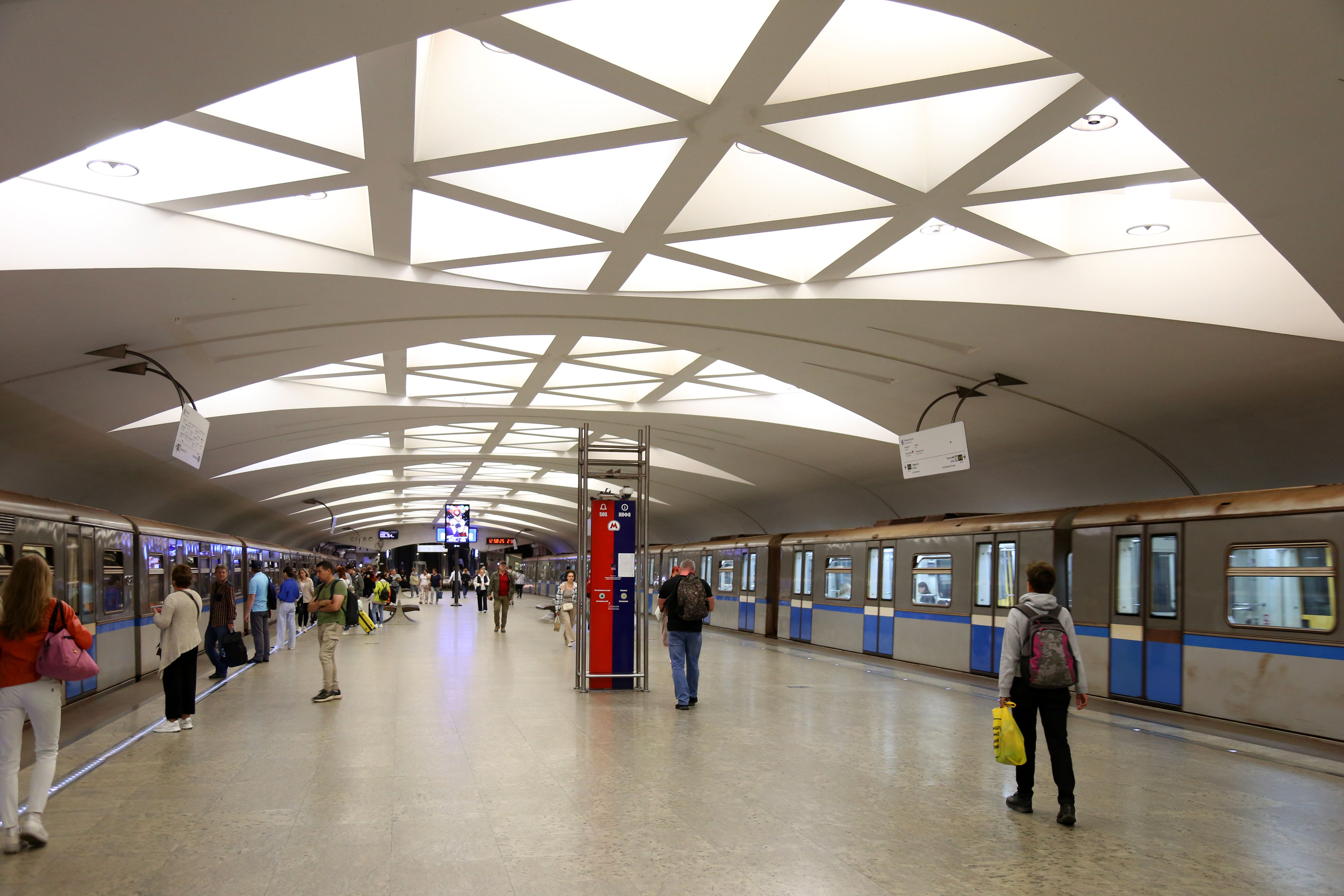
Strogino Metro Station, Moscow, Russia

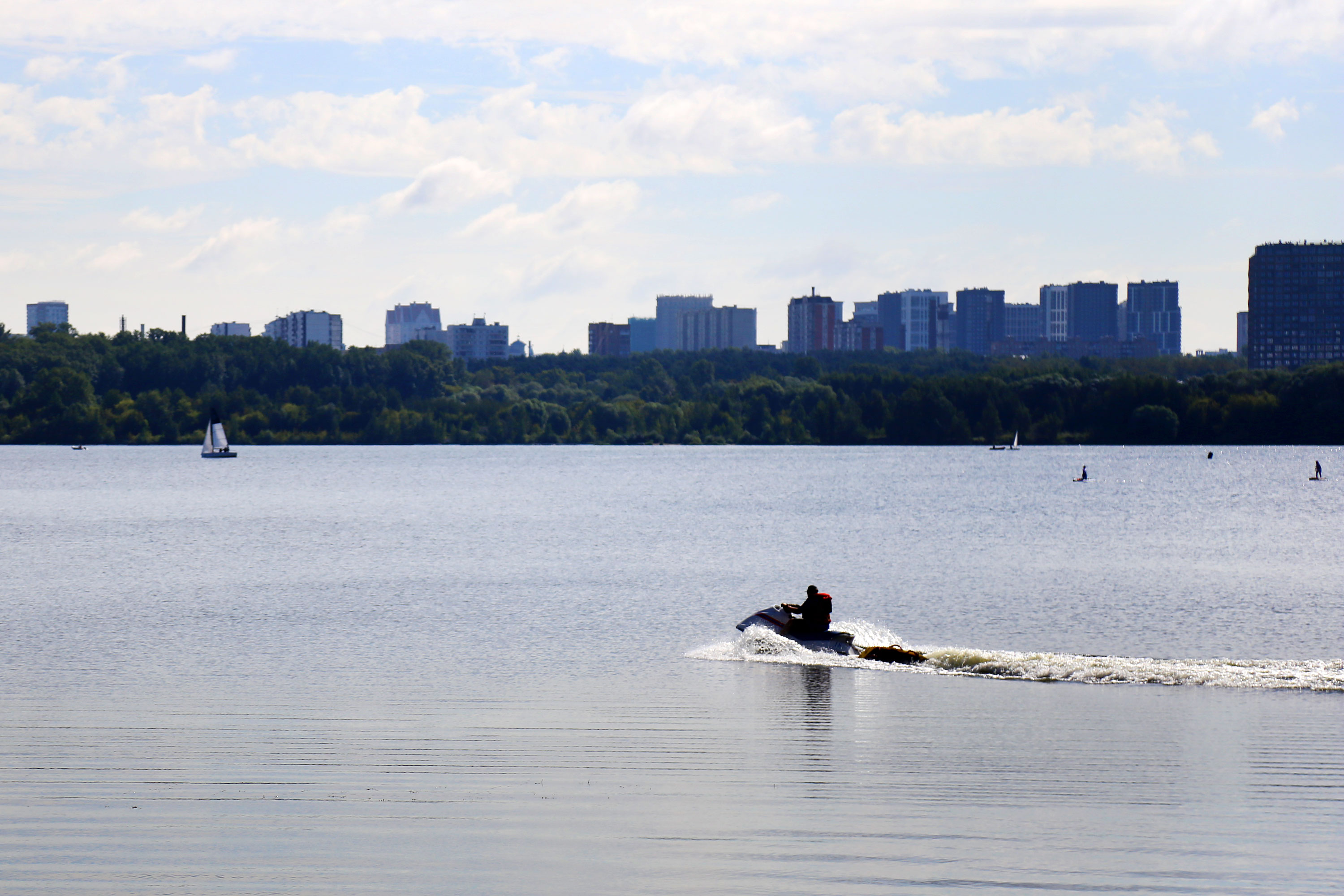
Strogino Lake, Moscow, Russia

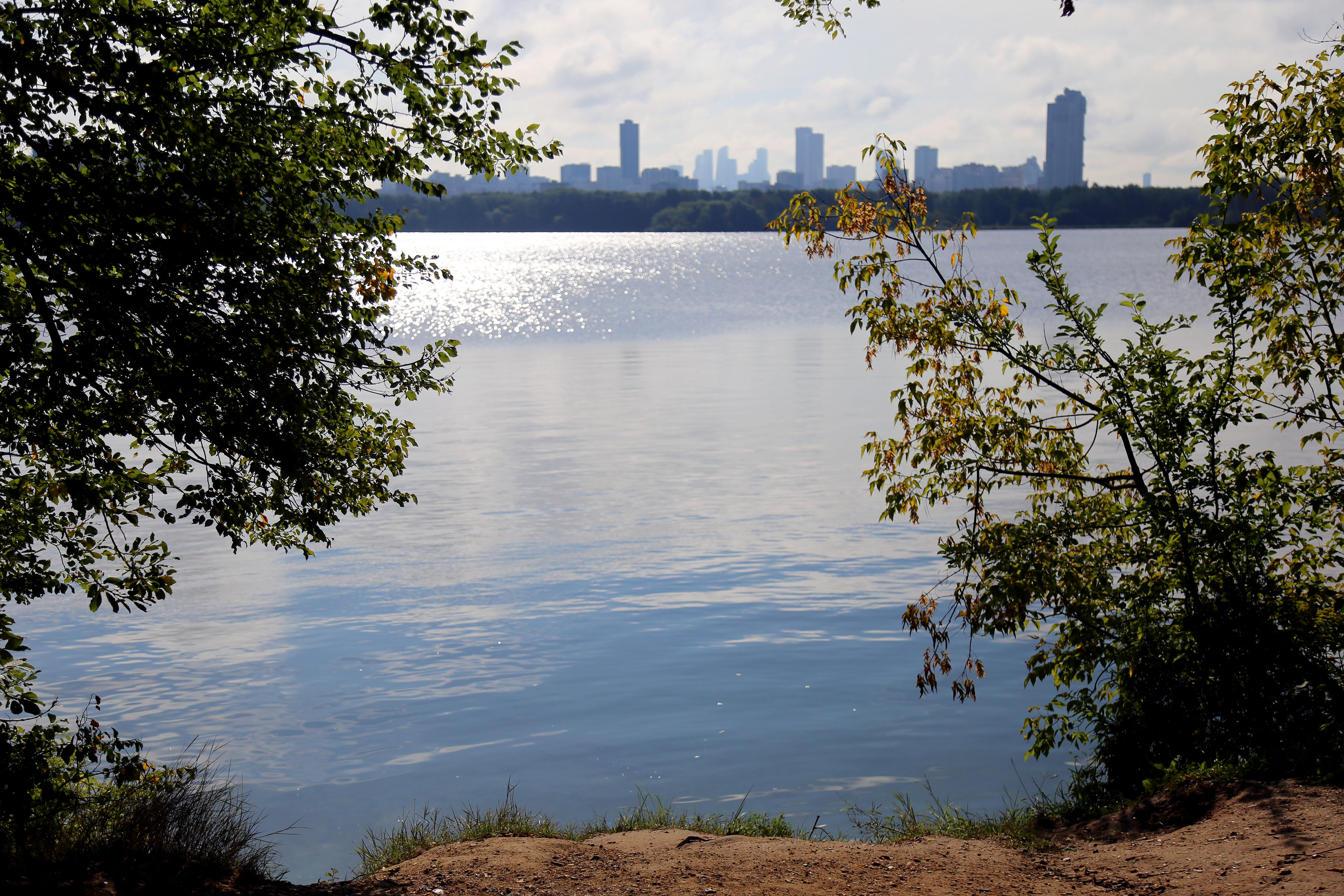
Strogino Lake, Moscow, Russia

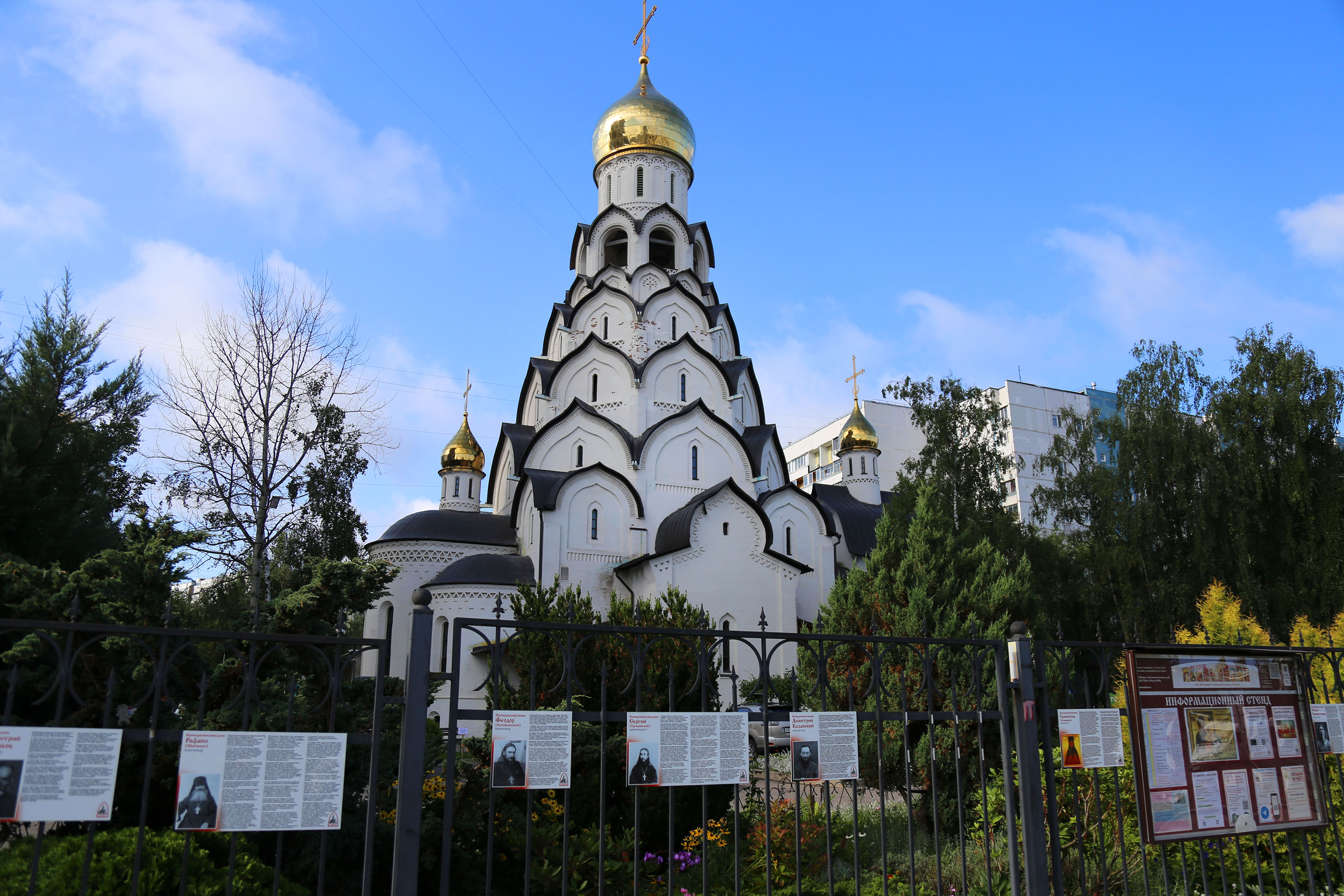
Khram Novomuchenikov I Ispovednikov Rossiyskikh V Strogino, Strogino, Moscow, Russia
