= Mitino (Moscow Metro) =

Moscow Metro station

Mitino Митино
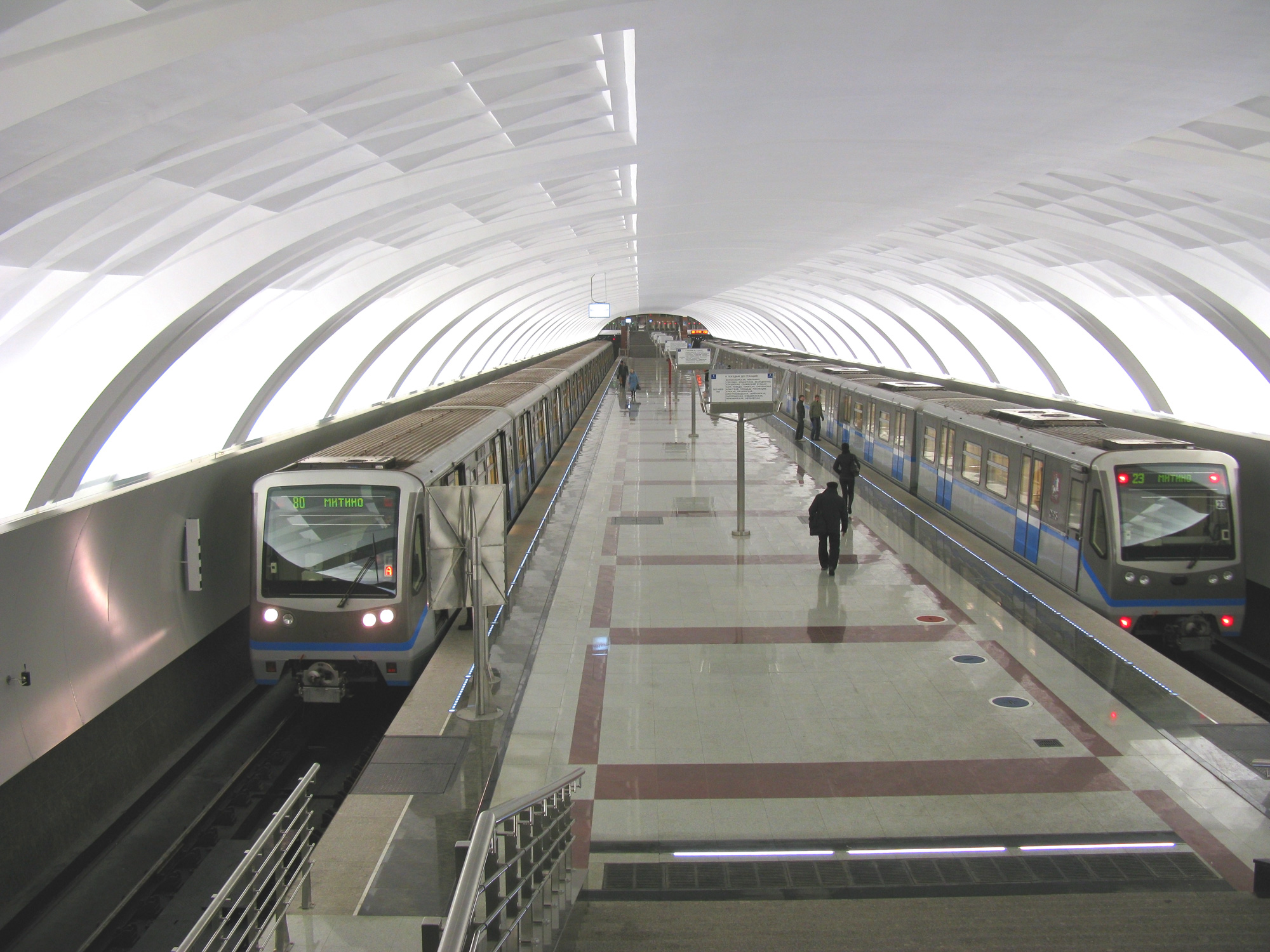

General information
- Location: Mitinskaya Street; Mitino District; North-Western Administrative Okrug; Moscow; Russia
- Coordinates: 55.8457°N 37.3622°E
- System: Moscow Metro station
- Owner: Moskovsky Metropoliten
- Line: Arbatsko-Pokrovskaya line
- Platforms: 1
- Tracks: 2
- Connections: Bus: 240, 266, 267, 400k, 575, 614, 736, 741, 846, 852, 930

Construction
- Depth: 14 metres (46 ft)
- Platform levels: 1
- Parking: No
- Accessible: Yes

History
- Opened: 26 December 2009; 16 years ago

Services
Preceding station	Moscow Metro	Following station
Pyatnitskoye Shosse Terminus	Arbatsko-Pokrovskaya line	Volokolamskaya towards Shchyolkovskaya
Route map
Location
- Location within Moscow Metro

Mitino (Russian: Ми́тино) is a Moscow Metro station in the Mitino District, North-Western Administrative Okrug, Moscow. It is located on the Arbatsko-Pokrovskaya Line between Volokolamskaya and Pyatnitskoye Shosse. Mitino opened on 26 December 2009.
