= Crocus City Hall =

Concert venue in Moscow Oblast, Russia

- Крокус-Сити-холл
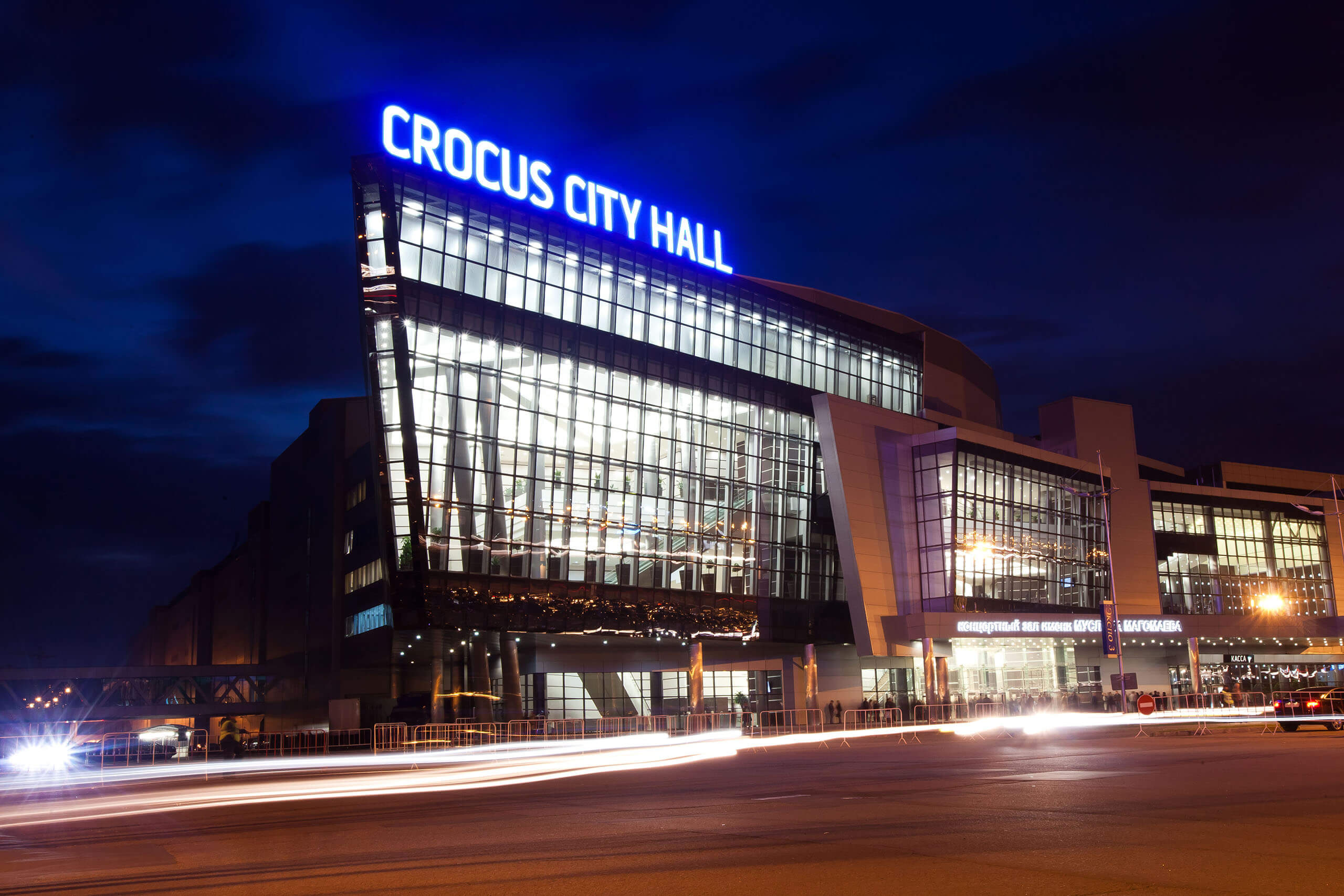
- Exterior view of venue (2020)
- Interactive map of Crocus City Hall
- Address: 20 Mezhdunarodnaya Street, 143402 Krasnogorsk, Moscow Oblast, Russia
- Location: Crocus City
- Coordinates: 55°49′33″N 37°23′25″E
- Owner: Crocus International
- Capacity: 5,000 to 10,000
- Public transit: Myakinino

Construction
- Opened: 25 October 2009
- Closed: 22 March 2024

Website
- crocus-hall.ru

The Crocus City Hall (Russian: Крокус Сити Холл, romanized: Krokus Siti Kholl) was a music venue in Krasnogorsk, Moscow Oblast, Russia. It was part of the Crocus City development, which also includes the Crocus City Mall, Crocus Expo and Vegas City Hall. It was dedicated to Muslim Magomayev (1942–2008), a Soviet singer born in present-day Azerbaijan. The venue was developed by Crocus Group, owned by Aras Agalarov, and opened on 25 October 2009.

The venue burned down in the Crocus City Hall attack on 22 March 2024 and, although it is planned to be restored, it will no longer operate as a concert venue. In March of 2025 a memorial for the victims of the 2024 attack was inaugurated in front of the concert venue and the second pavilion of the Crocus Expo exhibition space.

== History ==
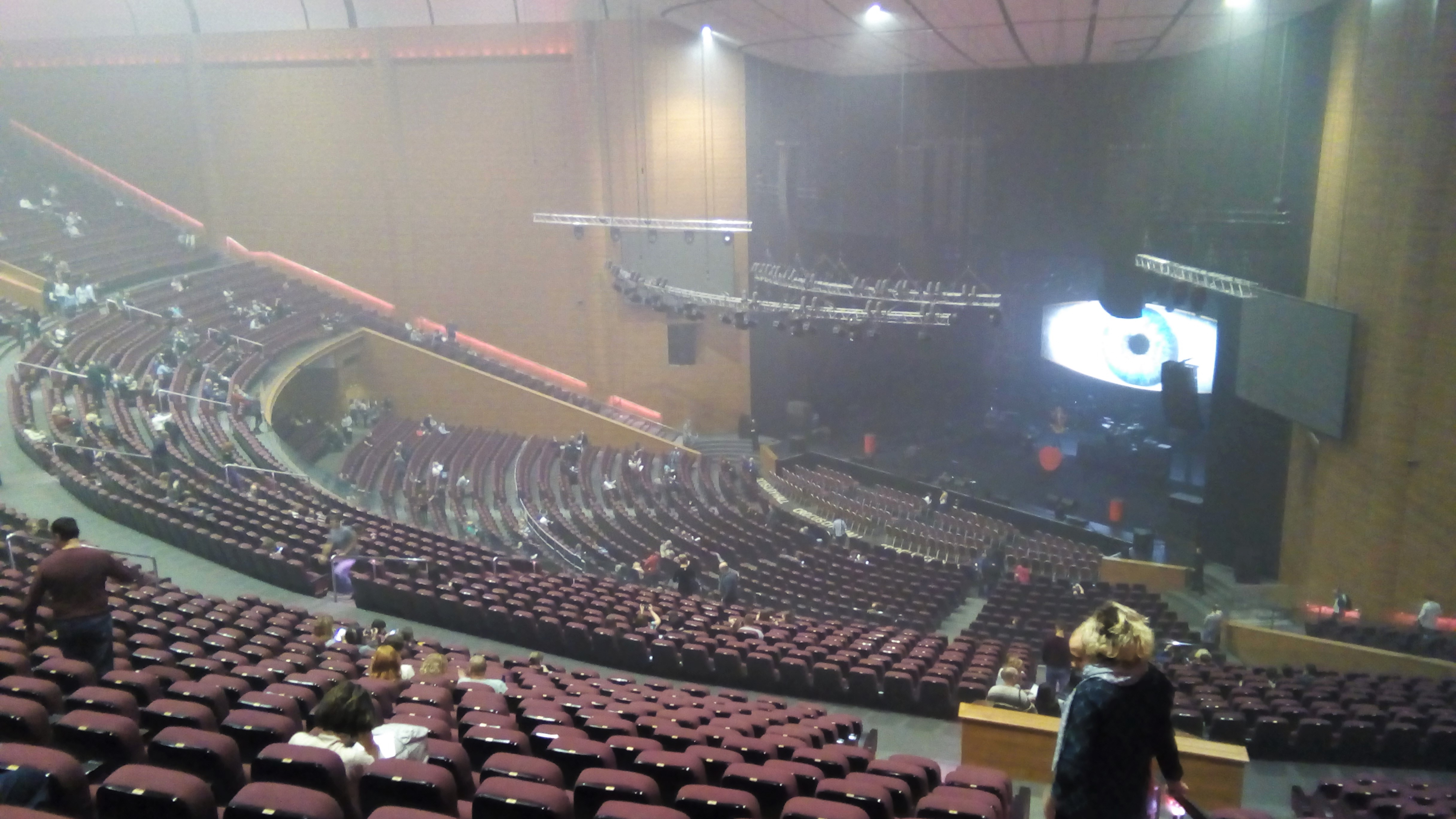
Crocus City Hall auditorium in 2019

Crocus refers to brightly colored, seasonal flowers that grow in the spring from a bulb.

The first concert was a memorial evening for Muslim Magomayev, featuring several dozen Russian pop stars.

Over three years since its opening, more than three million spectators attended about 900 events.

During its operation, Crocus City Hall hosted concerts by over a hundred renowned performers from Russia and other countries, as well as theater productions, sports events, and children's shows. Notable performers at the venue have included Scorpions, Smokie, the Pet Shop Boys, Nazareth, a-ha, Sting, Elton John, Thomas Anders and Vanessa May. It also was the location of the Top Hit Music Awards in several years and the Russian version of The Masked Singer.

Since 2010, every two years in even-numbered years, the International Muslim Magomayev Vocalists Competition was held at Crocus City Hall (except for the VI International Vocalists Competition, which was postponed due to the COVID-19 pandemic and held in April 2021). The competition's goal was to continue the performance traditions of domestic musical culture and promote talented vocalists. The first International Muslim Magomayev Vocalists Competition took place on October 23-24, 2010.

From November 5 to 9, 2013, the Miss Universe 2013 international beauty pageant was held in this concert hall, with a broadcast viewed by over a billion television viewers. The show featured girls from 80 countries worldwide, and the title and precious crown went to 25-year-old Gabriela Isler from Venezuela. Guests at the event included billionaire Donald Trump and Aerosmith frontman Steven Tyler, who chaired the jury and performed his hit Dream On surrounded by the contestants.

== 2024 attack ==
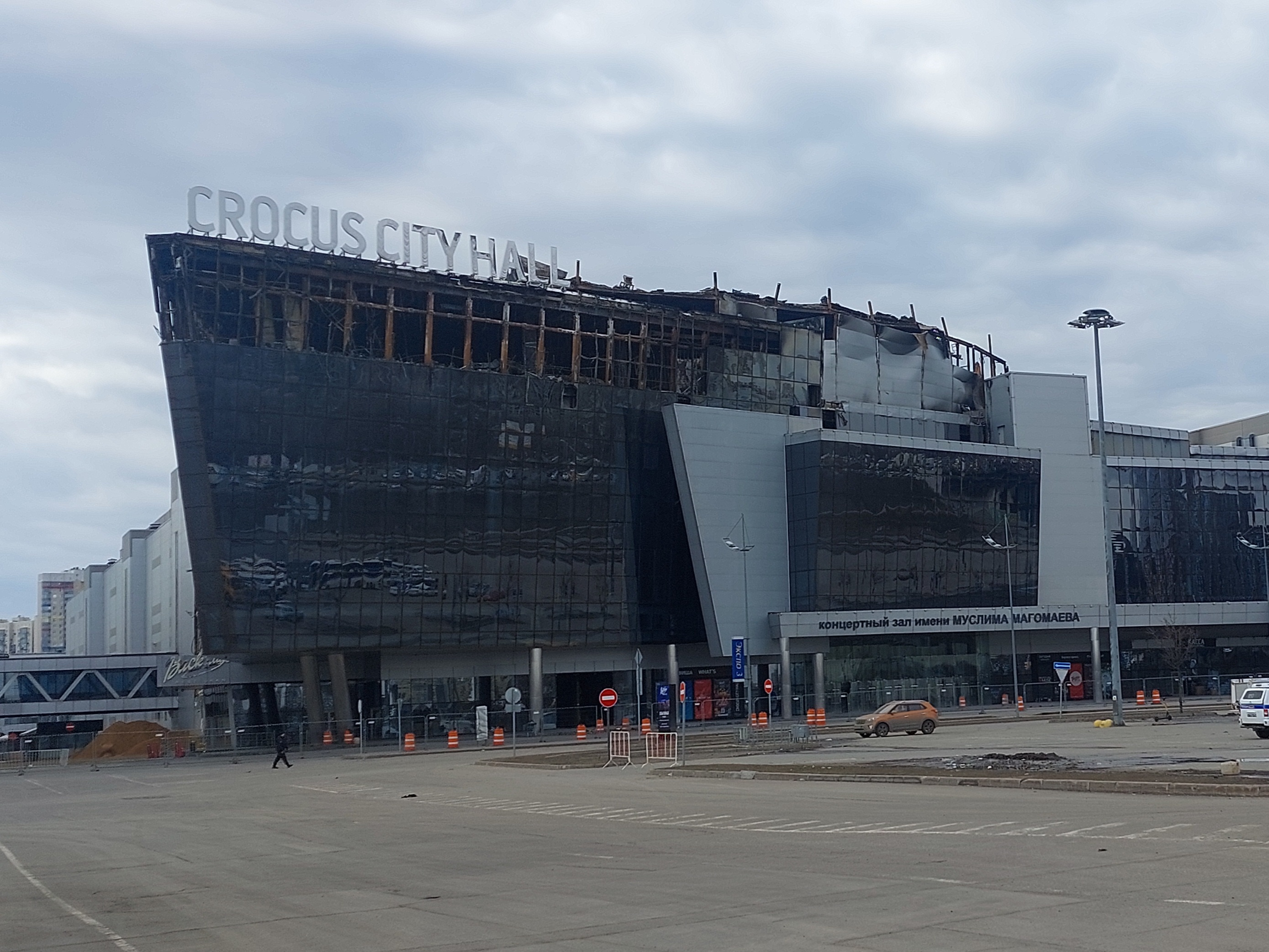
Crocus City Hall after the attack and fire, 30 March 2024

On 22 March 2024, at around 20:00 MSK (UTC+3), 151 people were killed and over 600 were injured after four masked and camouflaged gunmen committed a mass shooting and set off multiple explosions at the venue, which caught fire as a result. Russia's Foreign Ministry called the incident a terrorist attack. The Islamic State – Khorasan Province, a South-Central Asia-based regional affiliate of the Islamic State, claimed responsibility.

In the aftermath of the attack, lawsuits were filed alleging fire safety code violations at the venue.

== Reconstruction ==
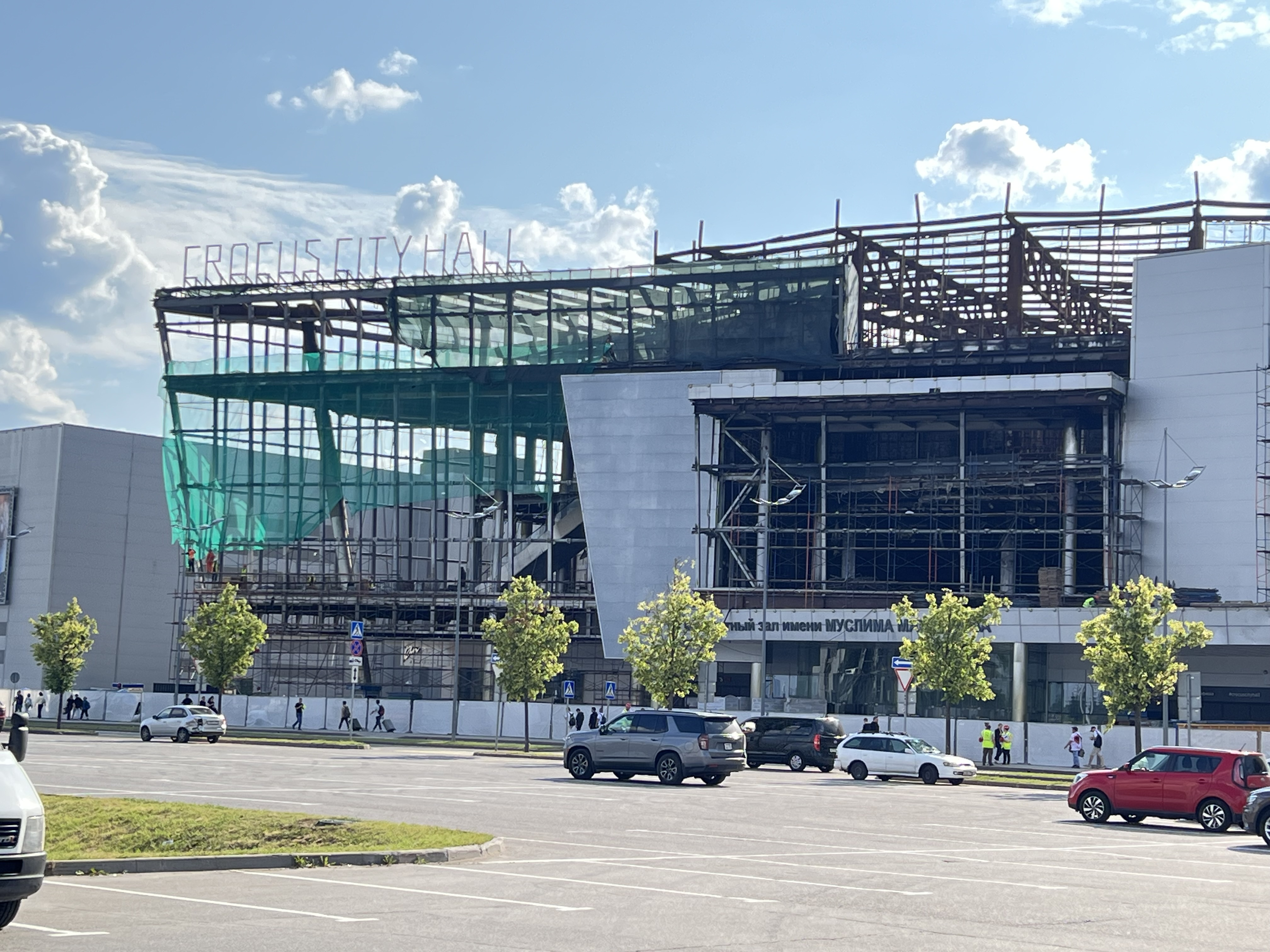
Crocus City Hall in July 2025

According to preliminary data, the damage to the property could amount to about 10 billion rubles.

Soon after the attack, the company owning the Crocus City Hall reported that the concert hall would be restored, but no final decision was made at that time, as the feasibility and timing of the building's restoration depended on the extent of damage to the structures and, in particular, the main load-bearing elements.

On 1 July 2024, a decision was made to convert the surviving part of the building into an exhibition space, with no restoration of the concert hall.

On 22 March 2025, on the first anniversary of the terrorist attack, a memorial to the victims of the tragedy was opened near the building.

On 27 April, soot-covered glass began to be removed from the burned-out building, a process that was completed on 30 April 2025. In July, the heated letters of the signage frame were removed from the building. Previously, the charred frame had been painted. In October, the glazing of the building was completed.

Preceded by PH Live (United States) Las Vegas	Miss Universe Venue; 2013	Succeeded by FIU Arena (United States) Miami
