= Arbatsko-Pokrovskaya line =

Moscow Metro line

Overview
- Owner: Moskovsky Metropoliten
- Locale: Moscow
- Termini: Pyatnitskoye Shosse (west); Shchyolkovskaya (east)
- Stations: 22

Service
- Type: Rapid transit
- System: Moscow Metro
- Operator(s): Moskovsky Metropoliten
- Rolling stock: 81-740/741.1; 81-740/741.4
- Daily ridership: 954,549

History
- Opened: 13 March 1938; 88 years ago
- Last extension: 2012

Technical
- Line length: 45.1 km (28.0 mi)
- Character: Mostly underground
- Track gauge: 1,520 mm (4 ft 11 27/32 in)
- Electrification: Third rail

The Arbatsko-Pokrovskaya line (Russian: Арба́тско-Покро́вская ли́ния, IPA: [ɐrˈbatskə pɐˈkrofskəjə ˈlʲinʲɪjə]) (Line 3; Blue Line) is one of the lines of the Moscow Metro system in Moscow, Russia. Chronologically the second to open, it connects the Mitino District and the town of Krasnogorsk to the northwest of Moscow with the eastern suburbs of the Russian capital passing through the city centre. There are 22 stations on the line, which is 45.1 kilometres (28.0 mi) long.

== History ==
The history of this west-east line is one of the more complicated of the Moscow Metro, and is partly due to the politics, namely constant changes of priorities. In 1935, when the first stage opened, a branch of the existing line ran from Okhotny Ryad to the Smolenskaya Square on the Garden Ring. The branch was extended to the Kiyevsky railway station in 1937.

In 1938 the branch was split into a separate line, and a 3.2 kilometres (2.0 mi) stretch connecting Alexander Garden and the Kursky railway station opened. Despite the outbreak of World War II, the construction of the metro continued, and in 1944 three stations of the Pokrovsky radius were completed.

The eastern part of the line was extended three times, one extension being to the Pervomayskaya temporary station inside a newly opened depot. It was replaced in 1961 by the Izmaylovsky Park, Izmaylovskaya and the Pervomayskaya stations. These three stations demonstrated a change of design priorities was straying away from Stalinist architecture to the new minimalism centipede designs supported under Nikita Khrushchev's leadership. The line reached its present eastern terminus in 1963 with an extension to Shchyolkovskaya.

The western end of the line has a much more complicated history. Though first stations of the west end were built below the surface, given their importance in the centre of Moscow and the threat of a nuclear war it was considered that these existing stations would be useless as bomb shelters. So, to solve this problem, it was decided to build parallel deep level sections for each station and close the older stations. The new deeper part of the line was opened in 1953.

The line was planned to be extended west to the district of Fili, but yet another policy change led to that extension not being built. Nikita Khrushchev was impressed by an extensive network of surface-level stations during his visit to the United States. Because of that, he promoted the idea of building the Filoyvsky Radius on the surface rather than underground. The Filyovskaya line consisting of four stations opened in 1958.

The Filyovskaya line turned out to be an unfortunate experiment, and in 2003, more than 50 years after the western terminus opening, the Park Pobedy station was opened. It took 15 years to construct the deepest station of the Metro (though most of the time its construction was on hold due to the shortage of funding in the late 1990s). In 2008 the western part of the line was extended further to the district of Strogino annexing some of the Filyovskaya line stations and extending the existing line by approximately 16 kilometres (9.9 mi). At the end of 2009, the Arbatsko-Pokrovskaya line became the first line of the system to cross the borders of Moscow providing rapid transit service to the city of Krasnogorsk.

=== Timeline ===
Segment	Date opened	Length
Kiyevskaya – Aleksandrovsky Sad detached from Sokolnicheskaya line	13 March 1938	4 km
Aleksandrovsky Sad – Kurskaya	13 March 1938	4 km
Kurskaya – Partizanskaya	18 January 1944	7.1 km
Elektrozavodskaya	15 May 1944	N/A
Ploshchad Revolyutsii – Kiyevskaya	5 April 1953	+3.9 km −4 km *
Partizanskaya – Pervomayskaya (old)	24 September 1954	1.5 km
Partizanskaya – Pervomayskaya	21 October 1961	+3.8 km −1.5 km **
Pervomayskaya – Shchyolkovskaya	22 July 1963	1.6 km
Kiyevskaya – Park Pobedy	6 May 2003	3.2 km
Park Pobedy – Kuntsevskaya	7 January 2008	4.9 km
Kuntsevskaya – Krylatskoye detached from Filyovskaya line	7 January 2008	4.3 km
Krylatskoye – Strogino	7 January 2008	6.6 km
Slavyansky Bulvar	7 September 2008	N/A
Strogino – Mitino	26 December 2009	6.6 km
Mitino – Pyatnitskoye Shosse	28 December 2012	1.5 km
Total		45.1 km

* Following new route to Kiyevskaya instead of the closed one via Aleksandrovsky Sad.

** Upon the 1961 extension, temporary station Pervomayskaya was closed, along with a segment of track.

=== Name changes ===
Station	Previous name(s)	Years
Partizanskaya	Izmaylovsky Park Kultury i Otdykha imeni Stalina	1944–1947
Partizanskaya	Izmaylovskaya	1947–1963
Partizanskaya	Izmaylovsky Park	1963–2005
Izmaylovskaya	Izmaylovsky Park	1961–1963
Semyonovskaya	Stalinskaya	1944–1961

== Transfers ==
Transfer to	At
Sokolnicheskaya line	Arbatskaya
Zamoskvoretskaya line	Ploshchad Revolyutsii
Filyovskaya line	Arbatskaya
Filyovskaya line	Kiyevskaya
Filyovskaya line	Kuntsevskaya (cross-platform interchange)
Koltsevaya line	Kurskaya
Koltsevaya line	Kiyevskaya
Solntsevskaya line	Park Pobedy (cross-platform interchange)
Serpukhovsko-Timiryazevskaya line	Arbatskaya
Lyublinsko-Dmitrovskaya line	Kurskaya
Bolshaya Koltsevaya line	Elektrozavodskaya, Kuntsevskaya
Moscow Central Circle	Partizanskaya

== Rolling stock ==
The line is served by the Izmailovo depot (#3) and it presently has 43 seven carriage trains assigned to it. Historically none of the trains that used on the line have been new rolling stock. Rather most of its rolling stock has consisted of older train models that were no longer being used on other lines when those lines upgraded their rolling stock to newer ones. Thus all trains that are retired from this line are sent to the scrapyard. For example, the Am and Bm types in 1975 and the D type in 1995 and currently the E type. Currently the line is being served by 81-74x series 5-car train sets with .1 and .4 modifications.

Subway car types used on the line over the years:

Type	Dates
Series A, B	1938–1975
Series G	1941–1950, 1954–1958, 1970–1975
Series D	1973–1995
Series E	1990–2005
Series Ezh, Em-508 and Em-509	1990–2010
Series 81-740.1/741.1	2006 – present
Series 81-740.4/741.4	2009 – present
Series 81-760/761	2015 - 2018

== Recent events and plans ==
=== The West ===
In 1953, after the closure of the shallow stations between Ploshchad Revolyutsii and Kievskaya and their replacement with the present deep ones, more westward extensions were planned to begin. However, Nikita Khrushchev's inspiration after visiting the New York City Subway prompted all works to be cancelled and the shallow stations to be reopened with a westward surface track creating the Filyovskaya line. Although the construction of surface stations reached the western districts of Moscow by the mid-1960s, the Russian winter climate took its toll on the operation and management of the Filyovskaya line.

In addition to that, the northwestern districts of Moscow, including the Strogino and Mitino housing estates, which were built in the 1970s and 1980s remained isolated. All of the bus and tram routes in that area led to the Shchukinskaya and Tushinskaya stations of the Tagansko-Krasnopresnenskaya line, which made the latter line one of the busiest in the system. By the mid-1980s it was clear that a complex reconstruction was needed to solve the transport problems in Western Moscow. The first plans to link Strogino to the city center were formed back in the 1960s before they were even built. The mid-1960s general plan proposed the new Tagansko-Krasnopresnenskaya line to have a branch from Polezhayevskaya which would continue westwards into Khoroshovo, Serebryany Bor and ultimately Strogino, and afterwards towards Krasnogorsk. Despite Polezhayevskaya being opened in 1972 with three tracks, it was never to be used for its intended purposes.

Owing to the disadvantages of the over-congested centre, a set of chordial and semi-chordial lines that would bypass the city centre and the Koltsevaya line was proposed in 1980s. The Mitinsko–Butovskaya line would begin in Mitino, continue south to Strogino and then to Khoroshovo, Fili, along the Moscow Little Ring Railway via Luzhniki before finally coming south to the district of Biryulyovo and continuing into Butovo. In 1988 building commenced on the extension of Arbatsko-Pokrovskaya line to Park Pobedy which was to be a cross-platform interchange with the new chord. At the same time, construction was started in earnest on three stations of the chord: Strogino, Volokolamskaya and Mitino along with a new bridge across Moskva River between Strogino and Volokolamskaya and a depot after Mitino.

In 1990s following the collapse of the Soviet Union state funding was cut to negligible amounts, and the construction of the chordial lines was permanently halted. In March 1993, Moscow Metro published a revised plan for what was to replace the chord. The already started section in Mitino and Strogino should be completed and the hooked on to the Filyovskaya line, and for the next ten years all Moscow Metro maps drew the three stations that way. However realistically, with the exception of the new Krylatskoye station (opened in 1989) and the underground Molodyozhnaya (1965), the Filyovskaya line could not have dealt with the additional passenger load, consisting of closely situated stations with short platforms. The same plan however also proposed that the Kalininskaya line would travel via Moscow-City to Khoroshovo and Strogino, and take the branch to Mitino. The plan also in perspective proposed that Park Pobedy of the Arbatsko-Pokrovskaya line would be completed and the line would then continue to double the Filyovskaya line, with two stations before docking at Kuntsevskaya and annexing the underground section of the Filyovskaya line. Because the Arbatsko-Pokrovskaya line had relatively low passenger traffic, it was decided to have it take up the main share of the transit load.

Only in early 2000s the construction of Park Pobedy, which remained on conservation, was resumed, with the station opening in 2003. The initial plan called for two stations between Park Pobedy and Kuntsevskaya: Minskaya and Slavyansky Bulvar, however, in order to speed up the work, it was decided to shorten the route and retain only a single station. Although Minskaya was first given the priority, under pressure from the local residents Slavyansky Bulvar, situated closer to residential areas, was finally chosen. The plan to simply cut off the Filyovskaya line at Pionerskaya was also reconsidered, and a cross-platform transfer at Kuntsevskaya was to be set up. The remaining Filovskaya line stations, Molodyozhnaya and Krylatskoye, were to be added to the Arbatsko-Pokrovskaya line.

Construction of a new radial highway linking the city centre with the M9 highway — the Krasnopresnensky Avenue — was started in 2000s, and it was decided to have it pass under the Serebryany Bor forests via the new North-Western Tunnel that would combine auto traffic on upper level and Metro tracks from Krylatskoye to Strogino on lower level. Necessitated by safety measures, a provision for a new station, Troitse-Lykovo, was left between the combined tunnel and Strogino, to be completed once a new housing massif is established there. The original project for Strogino station, which was to be a two-storied station, was abandoned in favour of a single-vault one, with a provision to build a neighbour when and if another line finally reaches Strogino. The path to Mitino also introduced a new station, Myakinino, the first station on the territory of the Moscow Oblast.

In 2008 the stations Slavyansky Bulvar and a redesigned Kuntsevskaya opened, and Filyovskaya line's underground stations Molodyozhnaya and Krylatskoye were annexed by the Arbatsko-Pokrovskaya line. At the same time, the extension to Strogino was completed, nearly doubling the length and passenger load of Arbatsko-Pokrovskaya line as a result. In 2009, the line finally reached Mitino, with an additional station Pyatnitskoye Shosse opening further on in 2012.

=== The East ===
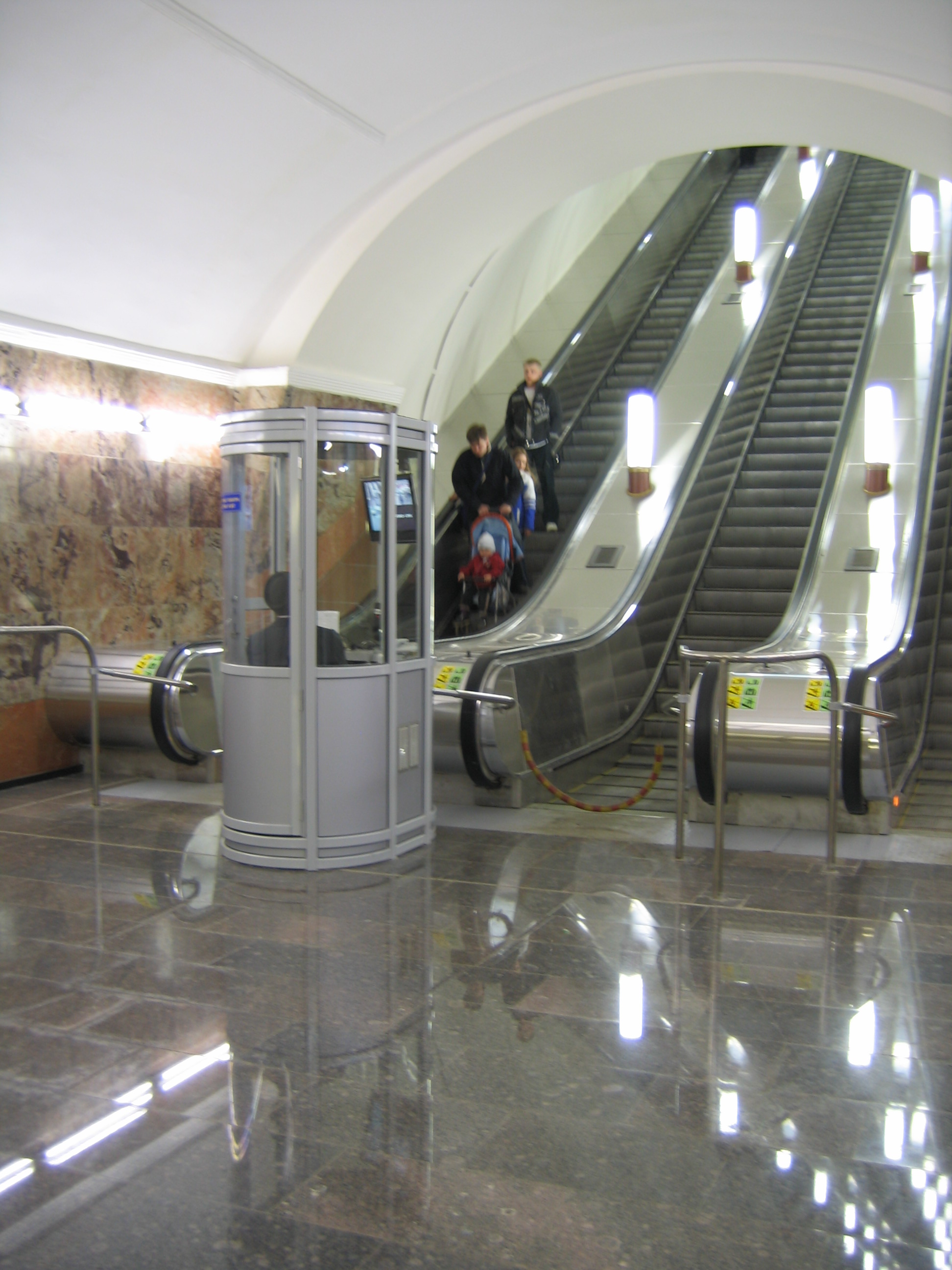
New escalators on Semyonovskaya

Some of the stations in the eastern section of the line are very old and many were built during the 1940s, and their age shows clearly in their appearance as well as their operational technology such as escalators. In May 2005 the Semyonovskaya station was closed for a year to replace its escalators and also to completely renovate and upgrade its vestibule. Elektrozavodskaya was closed in May 2007 and re-opened in late November 2008. The next station to be refurbished on the Pokrovsky radius is also the busiest, Baumanskaya, which was planned for closure in spring 2009, but has been rescheduled to 2015. Second entrances were also planned for the majority of the stations, but these plans have been cancelled.

In addition to the renovation works, new stations were planned for the line. In 1938, on the first stage of the line between Ploshchad Revolyutsii and Kurskaya, reservations for two future stations were built. Named Maroseika and Pokrovka, these two stations were planned to be opened at a later date. The former station in particular would have been very important as it would have facilitated a direct transfer to the Kitay-gorod station complex of the Kaluzhsko-Rizhskaya and Tagansko-Krasnopresnenskaya lines. Construction of these stations is not yet planned to occur.

In the very east another extension is proposed to Golyanovo. The Shchyolkovskaya station recently received a very major restoration with the old ceramic tiles replaced with modern aluminium panels.
