= Pyatnitskoye Shosse =

Moscow Metro station

Pyatnitskoye Shosse Пятницкое шоссе
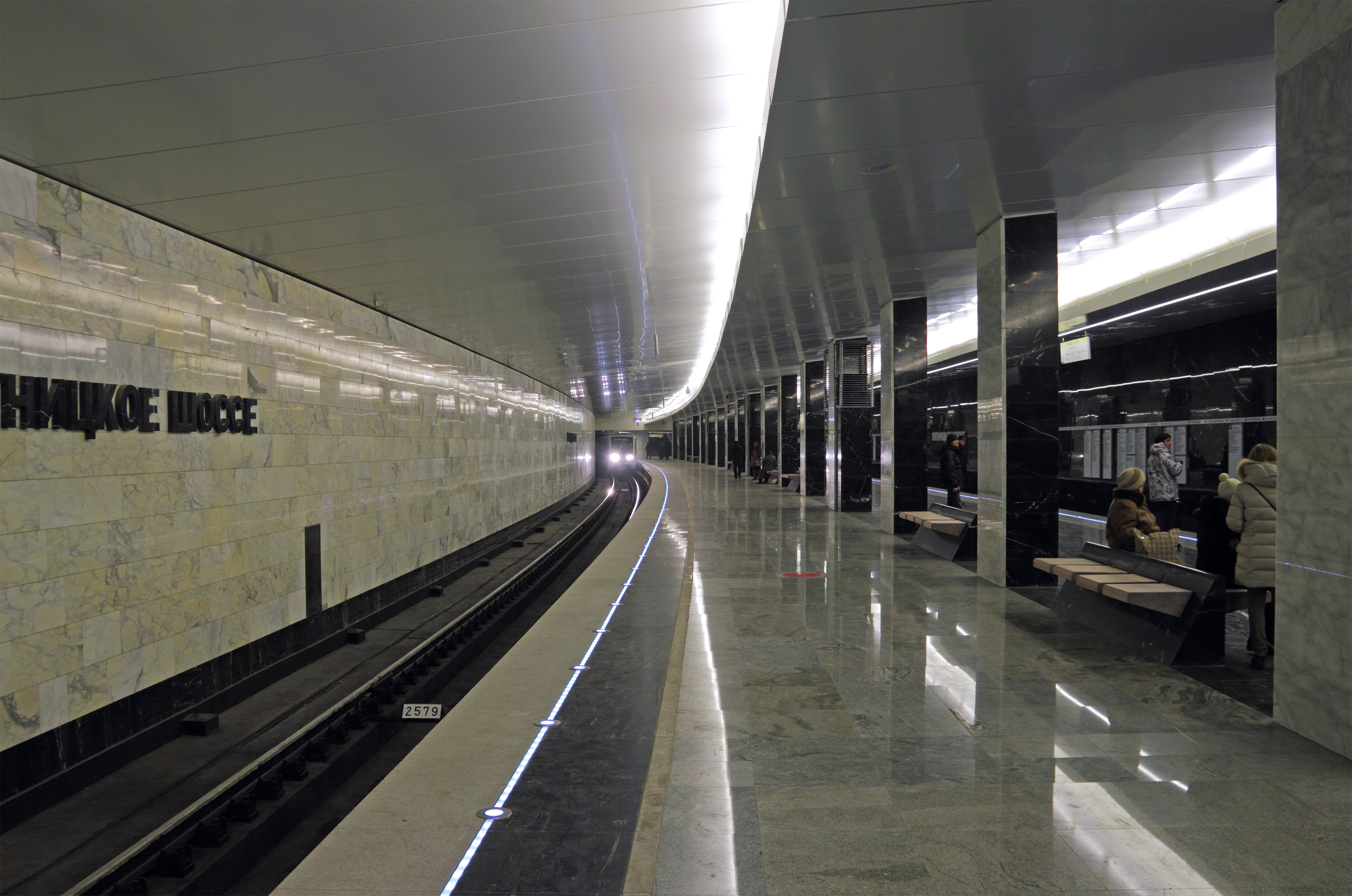

General information
- Location: Pyatnitskoye Highway; Mitino District; North-Western Administrative Okrug; Moscow; Russia
- Coordinates: 55.8563°N 37.3544°E
- System: Moscow Metro station
- Owner: Moskovsky Metropoliten
- Line: Arbatsko-Pokrovskaya line
- Platforms: 1
- Tracks: 2

Construction
- Platform levels: 1
- Parking: No
- Accessible: Yes

History
- Opened: 28 December 2012; 13 years ago

Services
Preceding station	Moscow Metro	Following station
Terminus	Arbatsko-Pokrovskaya line	Mitino towards Shchyolkovskaya
Route map
Location
- Location within Moscow Metro

Pyatnitskoye Shosse (Russian: Пя́тницкое шоссе́) is a Moscow Metro station in the Mitino District, North-Western Administrative Okrug, Moscow, Russia. It is the northwestern terminus of the Arbatsko-Pokrovskaya line. The station is located under the intersection of Pyatnitskoye Highway and Mitinskaya street.

The station was opened on 28 December 2012.

The mail hall of the station is curved, there are only five such stations in the Moscow Metro: Alexandrovsky sad, Kutuzovskaya, Mezdunarodnaya and Zyablikovo.
