= Mitino District =

Mitino Митино (Russian)
- District
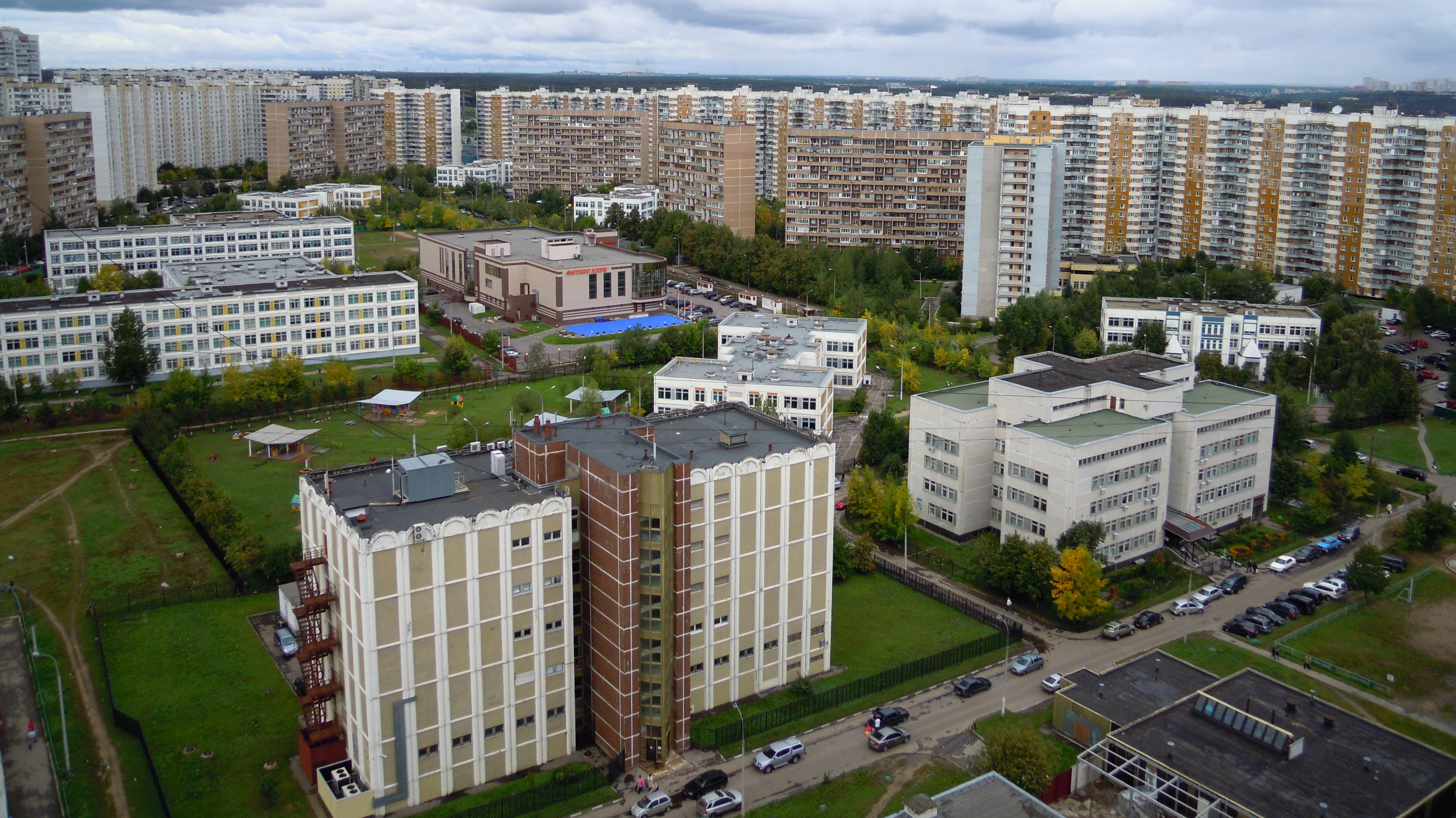
- Mitino Microdistrict #3, Mitino District

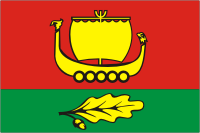
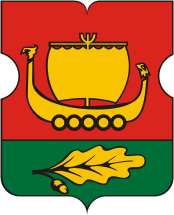
- Flag Coat of arms
- Location of Mitino District on the map of Moscow
- Coordinates: 55°50′45″N 37°21′40″E
- Country: Russia
- Federal subject: Moscow

Area
  - Total: 12.67 km^{2} (4.89 sq mi)

Population
  - Estimate (2017): 183,000
- Time zone: UTC+
- OKTMO ID: 45367000
- Website: http://mitino.mos.ru/

Mitino District (Russian: райо́н Ми́тино) is an administrative district (raion) of North-Western Administrative Okrug, and one of the 125 raions of Moscow, Russia. It is just outside the Moscow Ring Road, 17 km northwest of the centre of Moscow. The area of the district is 12.67 square kilometers (4.89 sq mi). Population: 183,000 (2017 est.);--> (2002 Census); (1989 Soviet census).

== History ==
Located in the outskirts of Moscow, the original village of Mitino merged into the city in 1985. Mass housing development in the area began in 1992. Mitino was built up with the same type of 17-storey houses, as well as several 4-, 5-, 6-, 9-, 14- and 21-storey residential buildings. Mitino became one of the most prestigious districts of Moscow due to its good environmental conditions and developed infrastructure. In December 26, 2009 was constructed Mitino metro station of Arbatsko-Pokrovskaya line that made transport situation in district better.

== See also ==
- Mitino (Moscow Metro)
- Administrative divisions of Moscow
