= North-Western Administrative Okrug =

North-Western Administrative Okrug Северо-Западный административный округ
- Administrative okrug of Moscow
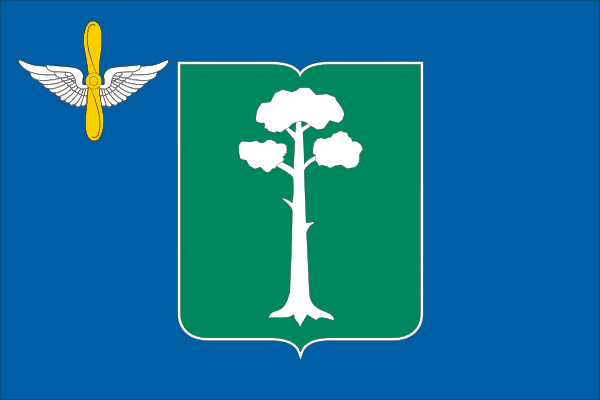
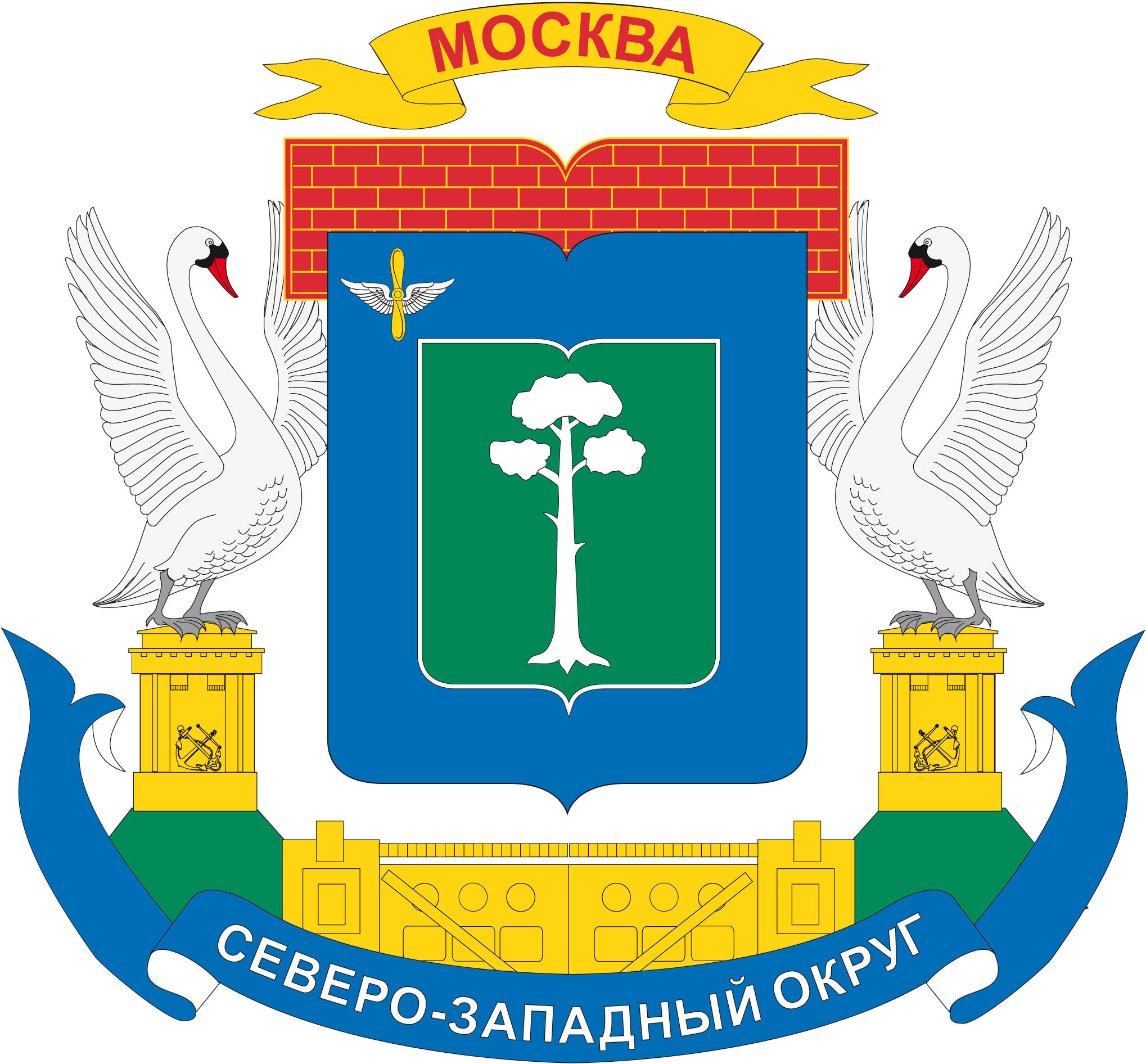
- Flag Coat of arms
- North-Western Administrative Okrug in Moscow
- Coordinates: 55°49′N 37°26′E
- Country: Russia
- Federal city: Moscow
- Established: July 10, 1991
- Districts: 8

Government
  - Prefect: Alexey Pashkov

Area
  - Total: 93.281 km^{2} (36.016 sq mi)

Population (2010 Census)
  - Total: 942,223
- Website: http://szao.mos.ru

North-Western Administrative Okrug (Russian: Се́веро-За́падный администрати́вный о́круг, romanized: Severo-Zapadny administrativny okrug), or Severo-Zapadny Administrative Okrug, is one of the twelve high-level territorial divisions (administrative okrugs) of the federal city of Moscow, Russia. As of the 2010 Census, its population was 942,223, up from 779,965 recorded during the 2002 Census.

== Geography ==
It borders the Northern and Central Administrative Okrugs in the east and passes by the Khimki Reservoir and the Moscow District Railway. In the south, it borders the Western Administrative Okrug and the bed of the Moskva River.

== History ==
The North-Western Administrative Okrug was formed in 1991 from Tushinsky and Khoroshevsky (before 1990 Voroshilovsky) boroughs of Moscow. The administrative okrug is sometimes referred to as "the lungs of the capital", as it is surrounded by the Khimki Reservoir, the Moskva River, and the Moscow Canal, with about 46% of its territory covered by natural features.

Until the beginning of the 20th century, what is now the administrative okrug's territory was home to peasant settlements in the Moscow suburbs Spas, Tushino, Strogino, Streshnevo, Khoroshevo, Shchukino, and others, which were incorporated into the boundaries of the city over the last fifty years. Many historical and cultural monuments reside within the okrug, such as the Trinity Church (in Khoroshyovo), as well as the stone church of the Vladimir Icon of the Mother of God, which was built in 1672 and has been preserved to this day.

== Territorial divisions ==
The administrative okrug comprises the following eight districts:

- Kurkino
- Mitino
- Pokrovskoye-Streshnevo
- Severnoye Tushino
- Strogino
- Shchukino
- Khoroshevo-Mnevniki
- Yuzhnoye Tushino
