= Shchyolkovskaya =

Moscow Metro station

Shchyolkovskaya Щёлковская
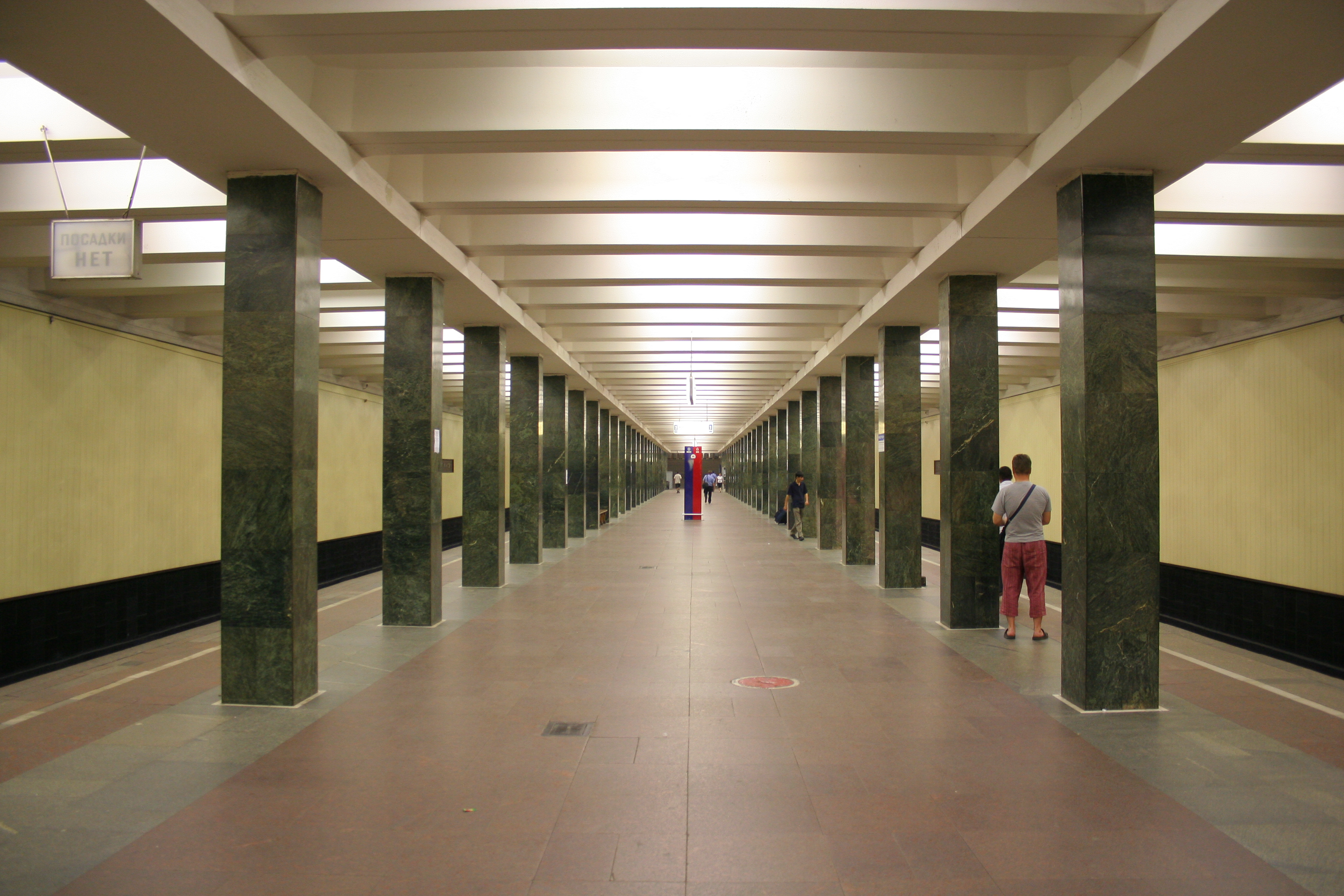

General information
- Location: Severnoye Izmaylovo District; Golyanovo District; Eastern Administrative Okrug; Moscow; Russia
- Coordinates: 55.8094°N 37.7986°E
- System: Moscow Metro station
- Owner: Moskovsky Metropoliten
- Line: Arbatsko-Pokrovskaya line
- Platforms: 1 island platform
- Tracks: 2
- Connections: Bus: 3, 52, 68, 97, 133, 171, 223, 257, 283, 449, 627, 627к, 645, 716, 735, 760, 833, т32, т41, т83, н3, 619, 371, 445

Construction
- Depth: 8 metres (26 ft)
- Platform levels: 1
- Parking: No

Other information
- Station code: 053

History
- Opened: 22 July 1963; 63 years ago

Services
Preceding station	Moscow Metro	Following station
Pervomayskaya towards Pyatnitskoye Shosse	Arbatsko-Pokrovskaya line	Terminus
Route map
Location
- Location within Moscow Metro

Shchyolkovskaya (Russian: Щёлковская) is a Moscow Metro station on the Arbatsko-Pokrovskaya Line. It is an Eastern terminus of the line. It opened in 1963.

== Name ==
Its name owes to the location near the Shchyolkovo highway.

== Building ==
It was built at 8 metres (26 ft) below the ground to the standardized column tri-span design, which was commonly used from the 1960s till 1990s. The pillars are faced with dark green marble. The walls were originally tiled by yellow and black ceramic tiles, but a modern metalloplastic cladding was applied in 2002, giving the station a cleaner look. The architects were Ivan Taranov and Nadezhda Bykova.

== Traffic ==
The station is highly loaded due to nearby Moscow Central Bus Terminal.

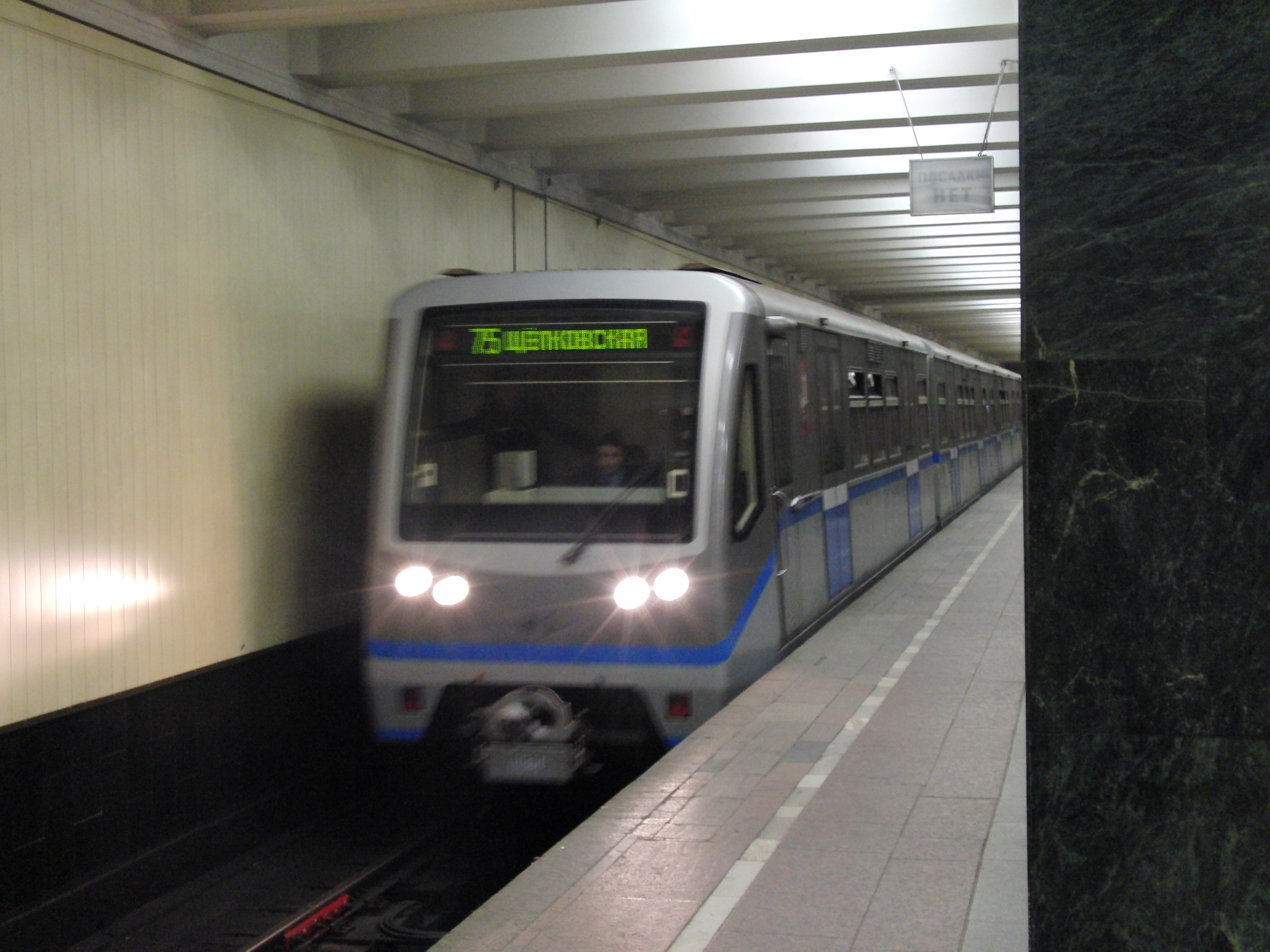
Platform with a Rusich train
