= Pervomayskaya (closed) =

Former metro station in Moscow, Russia

Pervomayskaya Первомайская
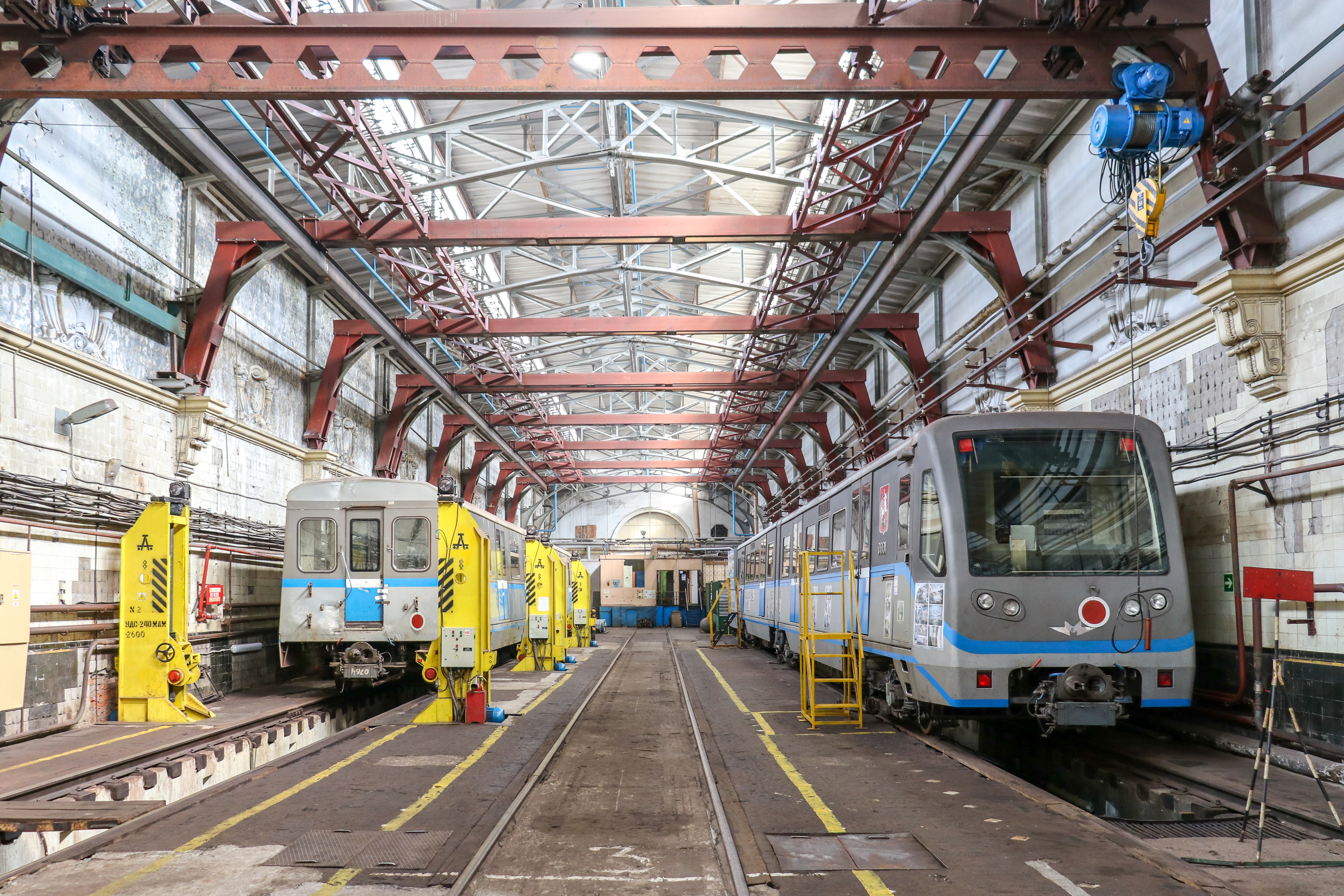
- 2021

General information
- Coordinates: 55.7894°N 37.7742°E
- System: Moscow Metro station
- Line: Arbatsko-Pokrovskaya line
- Platforms: 1
- Tracks: 2

Construction
- Structure type: Ground-level, covered
- Platform levels: 1

History
- Opened: 24 September 1954; 72 years ago
- Closed: 21 October 1961; 65 years ago
Route map
Location
- Location within Moscow Metro

Pervomayskaya (Russian: Первомайская - May 1st) was a temporary station on the Arbatsko-Pokrovskaya Line of the Moscow Metro in use between 1954 and 1961. It was closed after being replaced by a permanent station, Izmaylovsky Park (now Izmaylovskaya).

Pervomaskaya was located in the Izmaylovo depot, which was built in 1950. Out of necessity the depot had been built east of Izmaylovskaya (now Partizanskaya), since this was the only shallow-level station on the line. However, because of the dense residential area and natural parkland surrounding Partizanskaya, the depot had to be built at a significant distance from the station, about 1.5 km away in the Izmailovo residential district. For this reason, it was decided to establish a temporary station within the depot itself until a permanent station, which was planned for the early 1960s, was completed.

The new station opened on 24 September 1954, becoming the first ground level station on the Moscow Metro. It was also, to date, the only station with a wooden roof. On 21 October 1961, Izmaylovskaya opened half a kilometre to the east of Pervomayskaya and the temporary station was closed.

The station is still in relatively good condition, with its tiled walls and decorative reliefs intact. It has long suggested that Pervomayskaya be renovated and turned into a museum of Metro rolling stock, since some preserved examples are already stored at the depot. However, the depot's repair facilities were still active until the completion of a new depot at the west end of the line in 2015.

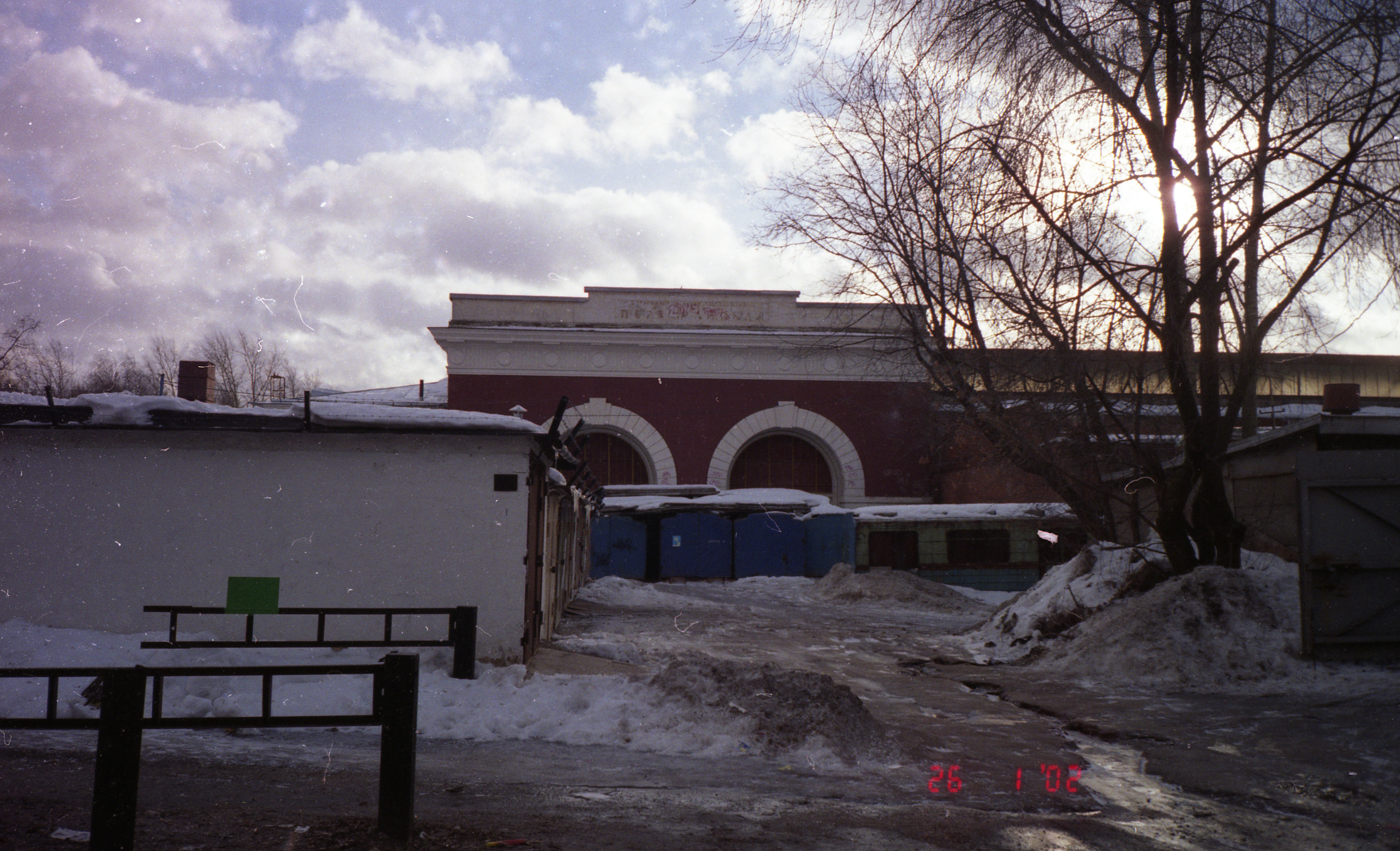
Former vestubule entrance (2002)

Pervomayskaya's former vestibule is located near the intersection of Pervomayskaya and 1st Parkovaya streets. This building remains in good condition and is used for official ceremonies by the depot workers and their families. Until 2002 the name of the station was still visible on the vestibule's pediment.

This station should not be confused with the newer Pervomayskaya station of the same line, situated further to the east and opened in 1961.
