= Manizer =

Manizer (Russian: Манизер) is a Russian surname of German origin.

- Genrikh Matveyevich Manizer (1847–1925), Russian painter
  - Genrikh Genrikhovich Manizer (1889–1917), Russian ethnographer
  - Matvey Manizer (1891–1966), Russian sculptor
    - Yelena Yanson-Manizer (1890–1971), Russian sculptor
    - Gugo Manizer (1927-2016), Russian painter
