= Izmaylovskaya (Moscow Metro) =

Moscow Metro station

Izmaylovskaya Измайловская
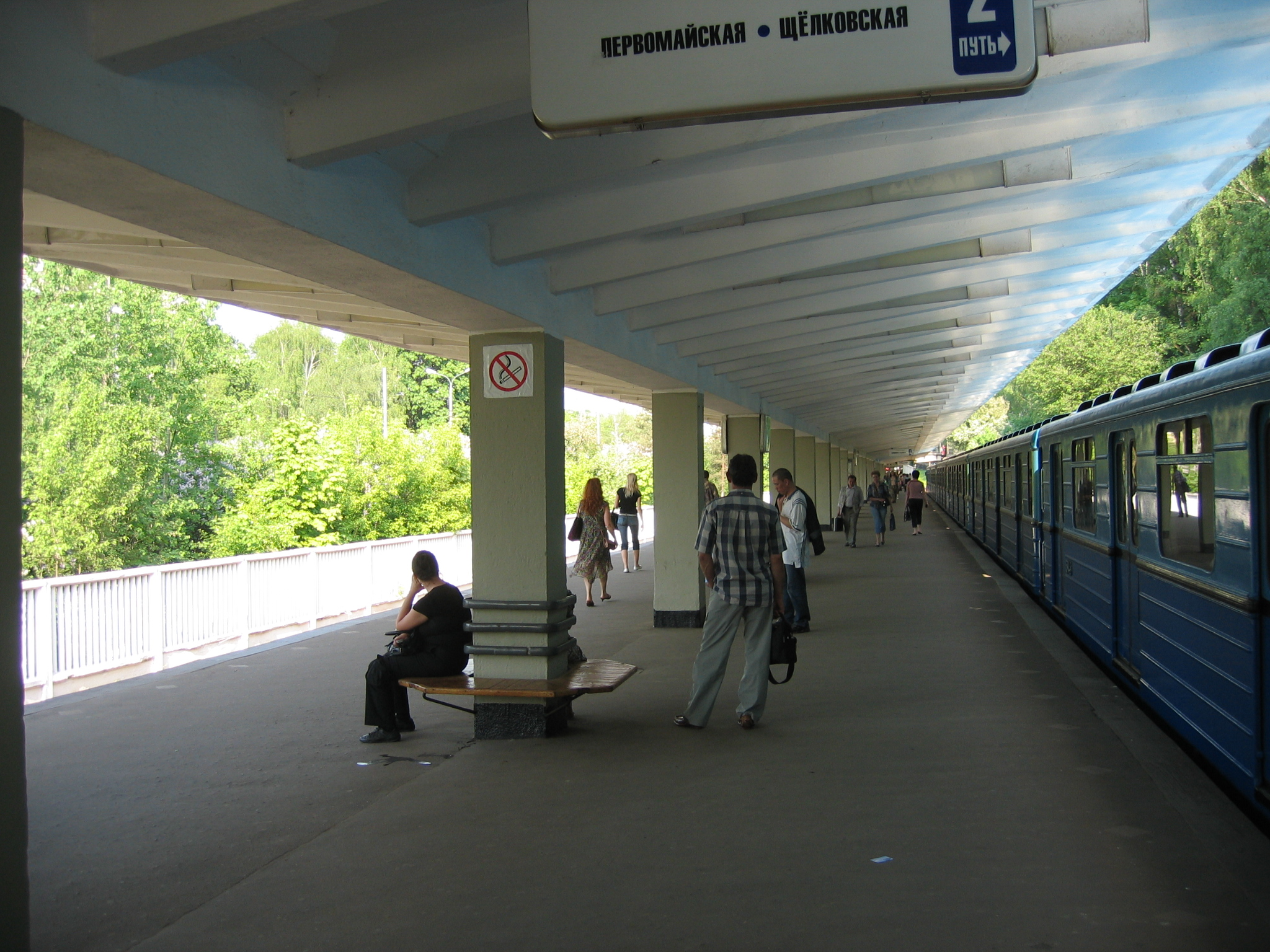

General information
- Location: Izmaylovo District; Eastern Administrative Okrug; Moscow; Russia
- Coordinates: 55.7878°N 37.7814°E
- System: Moscow Metro station
- Owner: Moskovsky Metropoliten
- Line: Arbatsko-Pokrovskaya line
- Platforms: 1
- Tracks: 2

Construction
- Structure type: Ground-level, open
- Platform levels: 1
- Parking: No

Other information
- Station code: 051

History
- Opened: 21 October 1961; 64 years ago

Services
Preceding station	Moscow Metro	Following station
Partizanskaya towards Pyatnitskoye Shosse	Arbatsko-Pokrovskaya line	Pervomayskaya towards Shchyolkovskaya
Route map
Location
- Location within Moscow Metro

Izmaylovskaya (Russian: Измайловская) is a Moscow Metro station on the Arbatsko-Pokrovskaya Line. It is one of the few surface level stations of the system. Moscow's harsh winters make above-ground stations impractical, but the design nonetheless enjoyed brief popularity between 1958 and 1966 because of the low construction costs. Izmaylovskaya was built in 1961 to replace the old Pervomayskaya station, which had been in use since 1954. The design of the station features an elevated vestibule, reached from the street via two flights of steps, which sits on top of the ground-level platform. The platform is relatively spartan, with a canopy providing some protection from the elements and pillars faced with white marble. The architect was Ivan Taranov. The station has a direct entrance to one of Moscow's largest parks, Izmaylovsky Park.

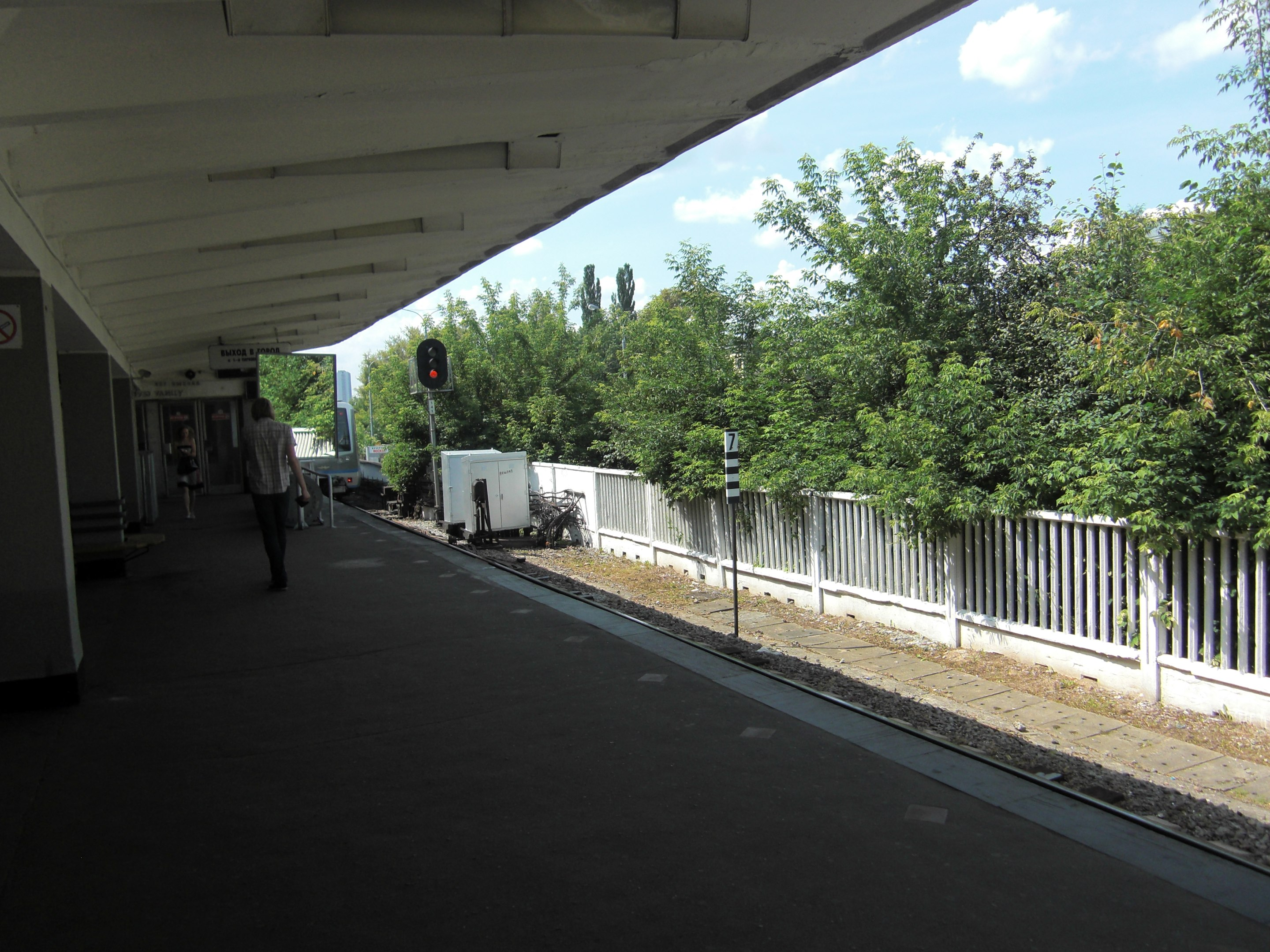
Platform of the station
