= Serhiy Steblyakov =

Ukrainian serial killer

- Born: 1983 (age 42–43); Ukrainian SSR
- Other name: "The Old Lady Strangler"
- Conviction: Murder x5
- Penalty: Life imprisonment

Details
- Victims: 5
- Span of crimes: March 21 – May 11, 2010
- Country: Russia
- State: Moscow
- Date apprehended: May 24, 2010

Serhiy Steblyakov (Russian: Сергей Стебляков; born 1983), known as The Old Lady Strangler (Russian: Душитель старушек), is a Ukrainian serial killer who, together with accomplices Azamat and Robert Kardanov, robbed and killed five people in Moscow from March to May 2010. Considered the ringleader of the trio, Steblyakov was convicted and sentenced to life imprisonment, while the Kardanovs received lesser sentences after pleading guilty.

== Early life ==
Little is known about Steblyakov's life. Born in 1983 in the Ukrainian SSR, he purportedly grew up without a father and was raised solely by his mother. By the late 2000s, he was married, and would subsequently move to Russia as a guest worker, finding employment in the construction industry.

=== Meeting the Kardanovs ===
Brothers Azamat and Robert Kardanov were both born in Stavropol Krai, in 1984 and 1985, respectively. Having grown up without a father, their mother moved them to the village of Belokamennoye in Kabardino-Balkaria, where they spent their childhood and youth. Due to the fact their mother had a mental illness and was unable to have steady employment, the Kardanovs relied on hand-outs from charitable strangers and were left to do whatever they wanted, spending most of their time on the streets.

In December 2006, Azamat enlisted in the Russian Armed Forces after he was deemed fit for service, but deserted shortly afterwards. He himself would later claim that he briefly served as a mercenary in the Second Chechen War, but deserted yet again and finally settled in Kovrov, Vladimir Oblast, where he married a local woman and had a child with her. An indeterminate amount of time later, Azamat would reunite with his brother and both would travel to Moscow to seek work in the construction business, where they would befriend Steblyakov. Bonded by their shared discontent with their low wages, Steblyakov suggested that they could earn money by robbing people, to which the two brothers agreed.

== Crimes ==
=== Modus operandi ===
As victims, the trio would usually target elderly female veterans, as they had easy access to their apartments, had trouble fighting back due to old age and received fairly generous pensions. However, they would also attack men, mostly targeting wealthy gay men on the behest of Steblyakov, who claimed that he did not consider them human.

=== Murders ===
The first murder occurred on 21 March 2010, when Steblyakov and the Kardanovs broke into the apartment of 85-year-old WWII veteran Nina Chasovaya on 35 Kakhovka Street. After strangling her to death, the murderers stole 30,000 rubles and jewellery before fleeing.

For reasons unknown, the criminals would wait for almost two months before striking again. Steblyakov informed the brothers that he had chatted up 46-year-old Khamzat Abdulrazakov, an openly gay Chechen man who held the rank of colonel in the FSB and had a construction business in Moscow. After meeting him through his boyfriend, Roman Shamatov, who was an acquaintance of Steblyakov, he convinced Abdulrazakov that he had a good business offer and arranged for them to meet on April 30 in Izmaylovsky Park. When he arrived, Abdulrazakov was lured deep into the park and then strangled with his own tie. Steblyakov and the Kardanovs then dug a shallow grave, threw the body inside and covered it with brushwood and old leaves. In total, they stole 18,000 rubles and an old Nokia phone.

Possibly fearing that Shamatov might become suspicious of his boyfriend's disappearance, the trio decided to kill him as well. On the night between May 3 and 4, they broke into Shamatov's house on Novokuzminskaya Street and strangled him to death. They then stole whatever they could find, stealing a total of 30,000 rubles in cash, jewellery and electronic equipment, but also small items such as gold chains, men's perfume bottles, a bottle of eau de toilette, a cigarette lighter, nail clippers and a Gillette razor case.

On 11 May, Steblyakov and the Kardanovs, on the pretence of finishing up some construction work they had been assigned to do, entered an apartment on 35 Kakhovka Street belonging to 81-year-old Zinaida Solovieva, a WWII veteran who had recently gone blind. After all three entered, Solovieva was bound and gagged with adhesive tape, allowing the intruders to steal 10,000 rubles and a gold chain from her apartment. Once they were finished, they dragged Solovieva to the bathroom and drowned her in her bathtub.

Apparently unsatisfied with their haul, the trio then entered the adjacent apartment occupied by 92-year-old Evdokia Artemkina, who was bedridden and unable to move. Due to her condition, her apartment was often left unlocked by her son - who was not home at the time - allowing Steblyakov and the Kardanovs to go inside without any issues. After noticing the elderly woman, the killers strangled her to death, then proceeded to steal 4,000 rubles in cash, two golden wedding rings and a bottle of "Staraya Moskwa" vodka. The two women's bodies were later found by neighbours who immediately alerted the authorities.

== Arrest, trial, and imprisonment ==
The double murder of Solovieva and Artemkina quickly garnered the attention of the Muscovite press due to the cold-hearted nature of the killings and the likelihood that they were killed by guest workers. No new leads would emerge until 23 May when a young man surnamed Bushuyev reported that he had been beaten by a trio of men near a gazebo, and that they had stolen his bag, sunglasses and notebook, worth 290 rubles in total.

Steblyakov and the Kardanov brothers were detained on the following day, and to the investigators' shock, all three confessed responsibility to the recent murders, claiming that they were desperate for money. After they were charged, however, Steblyakov recanted his confessions and claimed that he had been framed by the police.

As Azamat was still considered under active military duty at the time, despite being a deserter, it was decided that all three defendants would be court-martialed before Moscow's District Military Court. Steblyakov's attorney then submitted a motion for the trial to be held behind closed doors, citing the sexuality of the male victims as being a potential factor for the jury to be unfairly biased against her client. The motion was granted, with the judges reminding that the sentences would still be announced publicly at the end of the trial.

During the proceedings, the Kardanovs pleaded guilty to most of the charges, while Steblyakov categorically refused to admit his guilt. In the end, all three were found guilty on all charges, with Steblyakov receiving a life term, while Azamat and Robert were given 23 and 21 years imprisonment, respectively. Upon hearing the verdict, Steblyakov began crying and claiming that the entire case against him had been fabricated.

As of February 2023, no new information has been revealed about Steblyakov or the Kardanov brothers' status, but it is presumed that they remain incarcerated.

== See also ==
- List of Russian serial killers
