= Izmaylovsky Park =

Park in Moscow, Russia

Coordinates: 55.777°N 37.789°E

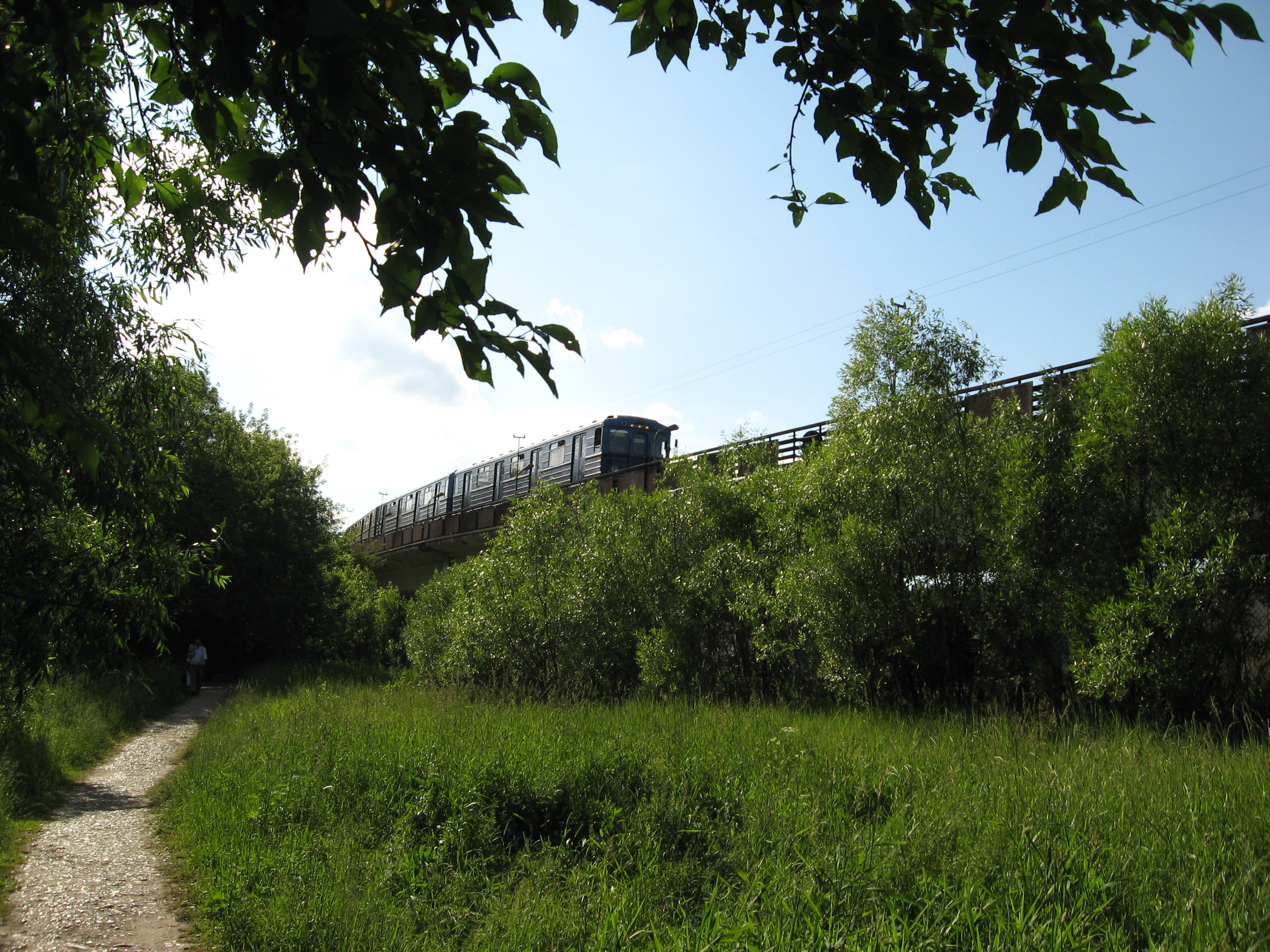
Moscow's Metro runs along the edge of the park

Izmaylovsky Park or Izmaylovo Park is one of the largest parks in Moscow, Russia. The park consists of two areas: Izmaylovsky forest and Izmaylovsky Park for recreation. It is situated in the Izmaylovo District in the northeast of the city. The northern border of the park is the tram line alongside the Izmailovskaya station of the Moscow Metro that serves the park, the southern border of the park is the Entuziastov Highway. To the east, the park is limited by the main alley and to the west by Electrodny proezd and 1st and 2nd streets of the Izmaylovo menagerie.

== History of the park ==
In 1571-1585 the park was a country estate of a Muscovite boyar Zakharyin-Yuriev. After 1585, the ownership of the park was passed to the House of Romanov. In 1663, it became the official countryside residence of Tsar Aleksey Mikhailovich. This occurred as the construction and redesign of the estate had been initiated.

At first, a dam was constructed on Serebryanka River which resulted in formation of several ponds, namely Lebedyansky, Vinogradny and Serebryany ponds. An artificial island was situated in the middle of the Serebryany Pond. Later, the Izmaylovo Estate was built on the artificial island which existed up until 1855. Christmas church was also built on the Serebryany Island in 1676, which became the cathedral in 1679. There were a lot of gardens with exotic plants and trees, cherished under personal supervision of the tsar. The household buildings also included greenhouses, mills, breweries and other facilities. The organization of the household was so efficient that it alone could fully satisfy the needs of the tsar’s court. One of the biggest zoos in Europe at that time could also be found in the Izmaylovo Manor.

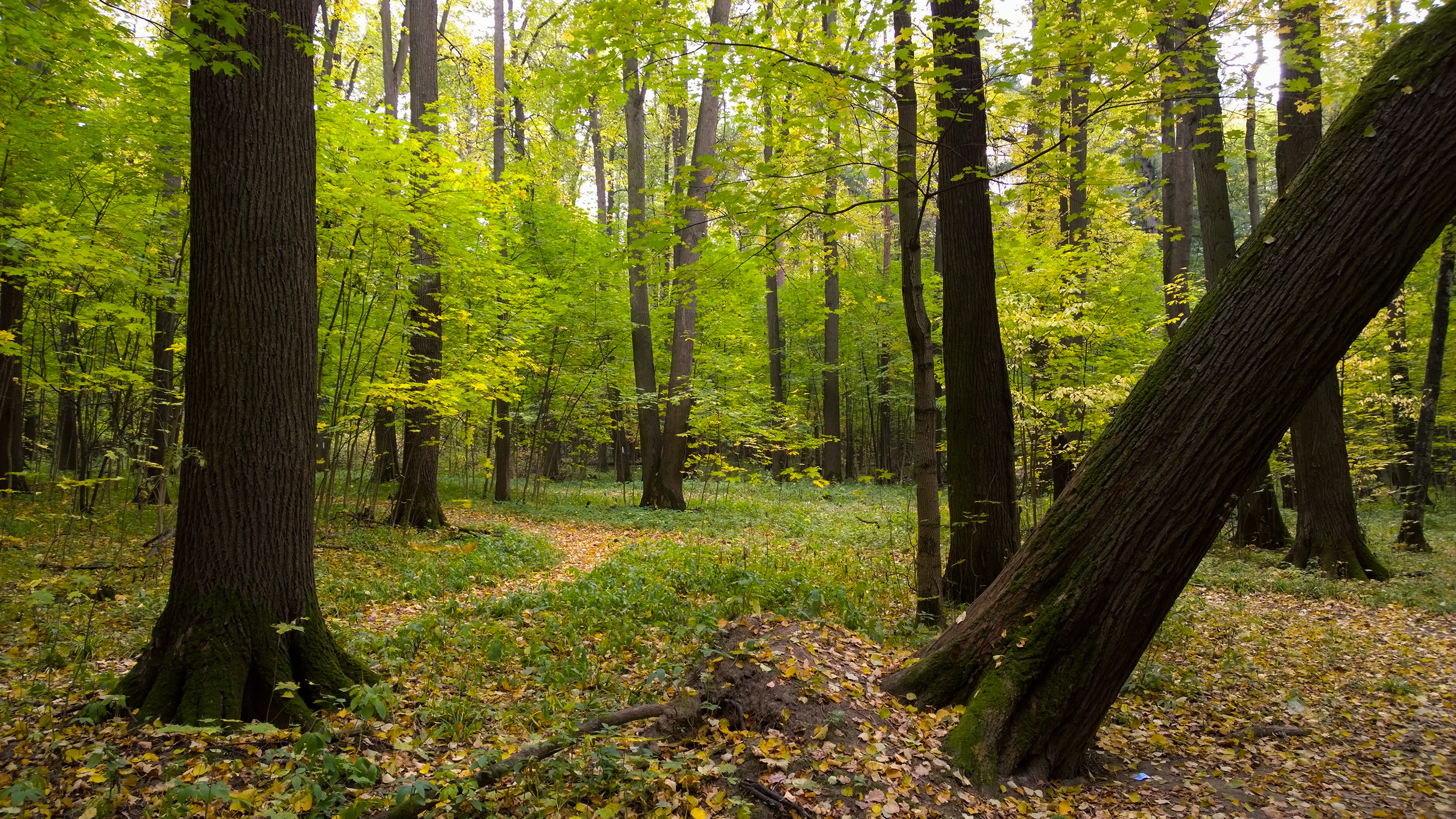
Century old trees of the Izmaylovsky park

After the death of Aleksey Mikhailovich the estates were abandoned and a lot of the buildings and facilities fell into decline. When he was a child, Peter the Great used the territory and the gardens for his war games; the remains of the redoubts he built are still partially preserved. He also constructed a Prosyansky (Zhukovski) dam on the Serebryanka river to form a pond, which was later used for the trial sails of the botik “St. Nicholas” that Peter the Great discovered in Izmaylovo.

In 1839, the mansion was used as a hospice and a house for the veterans of the war with Napoleon, as well as a shelter for the widows and a small school for their children. In 19th century a big effort was put into recovery and restoration of the forests and gardens on the territory of the future Izmaylovsky park that continued over the decades.

In 1930, Izmaylovo was given an official status of the park and in 1939 it was renamed after J.V. Stalin. It was one of the best parks in USSR, with a lot of facilities, including a theatre and a cinema. The park’s giant territory allowed for more objects to be installed, thus a pond was to be created in the middle of the park, and a zoo in the eastern part of it. A giant central stadium also named after Stalin was supposed to be the highlight of the park infrastructure and the biggest stadium in the country. The construction, although started, was haltered by the Second World War and never finished.

In 1944, an underground station “Izmaylovsky park” was built to allow good transportation links with the other parts of the city. In 1961 the park was renamed to Izmaylovsky park, falling in line with the general direction of the party against Stalin's cult of personality. The underground station was renamed in 2005 into Partizanskaya.

== Available activities ==
- Bavarian curling
- Shuffleboard
- two Ferris wheels
- children's playground
- amusement park and rides
- 5D cinema
- swimming pool
- dolphinarium
- adventure park"PandaPark"
- equipment hiring
- skaters area
- boat hiring

Also, throughout the year free outdoor classes and courses are free to the public, including general work-out, yoga, dancing and aerobics for children. For children, there is also a small zoo with rabbits, rats, hedgehogs and Guinea pigs. In winter a skating rink is open.

== Izmaylovsky forest ==
Izmaylovsky forest has a territory of 1608.1 hectares. The forest has a big diversity of plant species, including those that are endangered and are monitored by the Preservation agencies (almost 50 species). Rarely observed in urban areas, the transitional bog of the forest has originated from growing of the sphagnum moss. There are more than 25 species of lichens and 75 species of moss. The major part of the forest consists of deciduous trees, such as linden tree, oak, birch, maple. The Eastern part of the forest is constituted mainly by pines and firs that are more than hundred years old and were planted in the middle of 19th century as a part of the forest restoration effort. In total, more than 500 species are presented within the biological diversity of the forest. Some flowering plants are also preserved: various species of lilies, including Turk's cap lily, orchids, etc. Many species are registered medicinal plants and are listed in the Russian Pharmacopoeia (The State Pharmacopoeia of the Russian Federation), such as bistort Bistorta officinalis.

== Lebedyansky Pond ==
Lebedyansky pond is one of the ponds in the east of Moscow (Yuzhnoe Izmailovo) in a valley of the Serebrianka on the territory of Izmailovsky Urban Forest Park]]. There are several ponds in the park, and Lebedyansky is a largest of them (16 hectares). The origin of the pond's name is not entirely clear; one of the theories that name originated from Russian word "lebyad'" - (Ru - лебедь) swan. The pond's old name is Lebedevski. There are total of 13 ponds in the cascade, including Red ("Krasnyi" Ru - Красный), Deer ( "Oleniy" Ru - Олений), Lebedyansky, Terletskiy, Three Sovhoznys and other smaller ones, connected by canals build in the late 17th century and local rivers, the Serebryanka, the Steklyanka, and the Sosenka. The total area of the ponds is 422,000 square metres (4,540,000 ft^{2}).

== Interesting facts ==
- In November 1995, Chechen terrorists planted, but did not detonate, a radiological dispersal device (commonly known as a dirty bomb) in Izmailovo Park. The bomb consisted of dynamite and caesium-137 removed from cancer treatment equipment. Reporters were tipped off about its location and it was defused.
- There is also a stand-up comedy show in Russian television with the same name (Izmaylovsky Park), starring Russian comedian Lion Izmailov. The name is based on a word play, where Izmaylovsky belongs both to the park (where people get together for recreation) and to the surname of the show host.
