= Serebryanka (Moscow) =

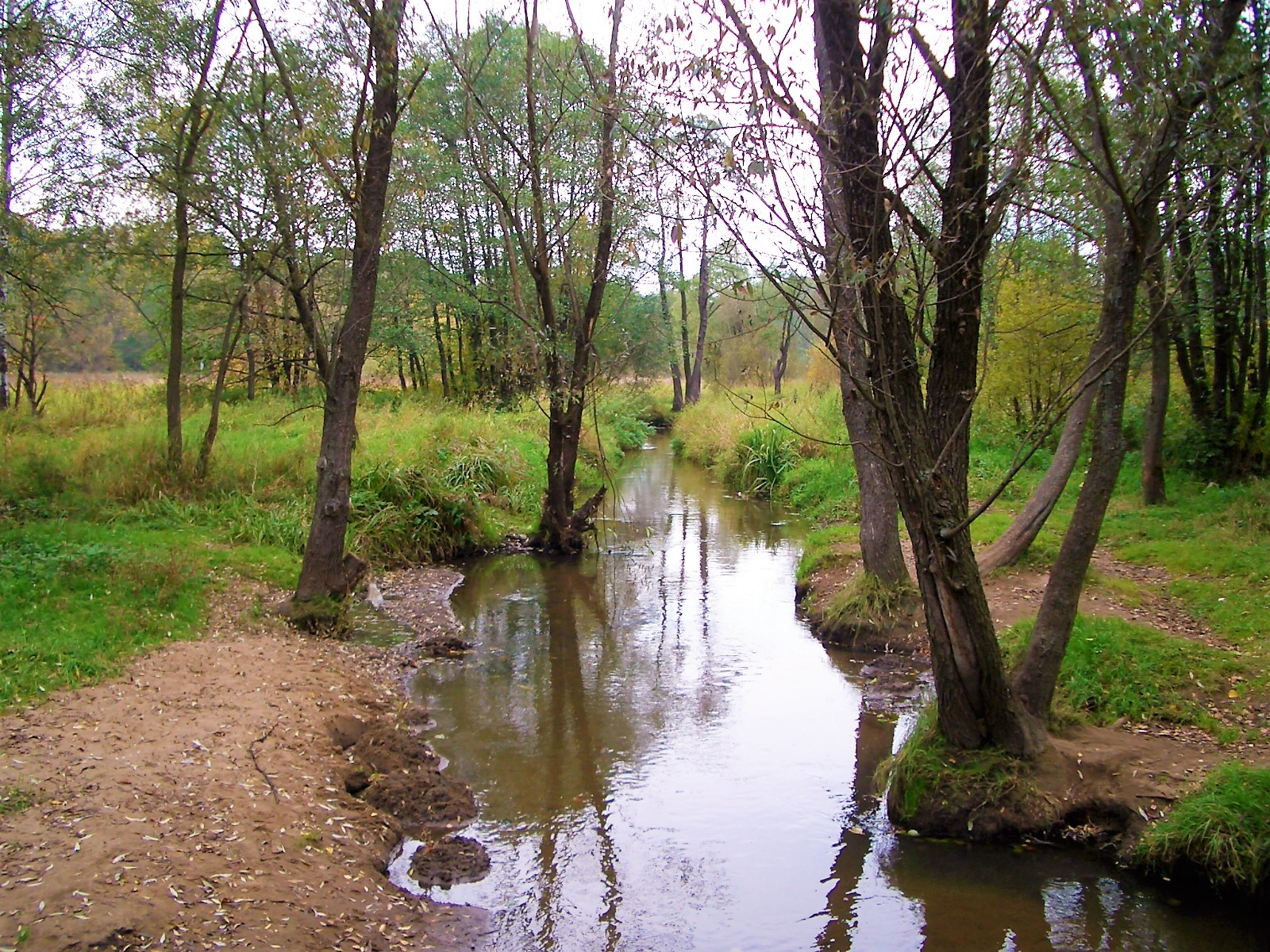

Location
- Country: Russia

Physical characteristics
- Source
  - location: swamp east of MKAD, east of Moscow
- Mouth: Khapilovka
  - coordinates: 55°47′39″N 37°44′03″E
- Length: 12 km (7.5 mi)

Basin features
- Progression: Khapilovka→ Yauza→ Moskva→ Oka→ Volga→ Caspian Sea

Serebryanka (Izmaylovka in a past - Robka) is a river in the north-east of Moscow, left tributary of Khapilovka, in turn a tributary of the Yauza.

== Course ==
Originating in a swamp outside the MKAD, and running through the city near шоссе Энтузиастов (the highway of Enthusiasts), just south of microdistrict Yuzhnoye Izmaylovo, in Izmailovsky Urban Forest Park, passing through Serebryano-Vinogradniy pond (Ru - Серебряно-Виноградный пруд), the Serebryanka then merges with the River Sosenka to form the Khapilovka in the region of 1st Pugachevskaya Street.

The total length of the river is 12 km, (8.6 km within borders of Moscow).

=== Tributaries ===
Several streams flowing into the Serebryanka inside Izmailovsky Urban Forest Park. They are Lipitinsky, Kosinsky, Red and Black brooks.

An artificial branch of the Serebryanka supplies Lebedyansky pond.

In addition, several ponds in Izmaylovsky Urban Forest Park belongs to basin Serebryanka river. They are the Red Pond, Decorative Pond, Deer Pond, and others.

== Settlement ==
On the banks of Serebryanka stood villages Ivanovskoye, Cherkizovo and Izmaylovo (hence its second name - Izmaylovka).
