= Chelyabinskaya Street =

Street in Moscow, Russia

Coordinates: 55°46′40″N 37°49′48″E

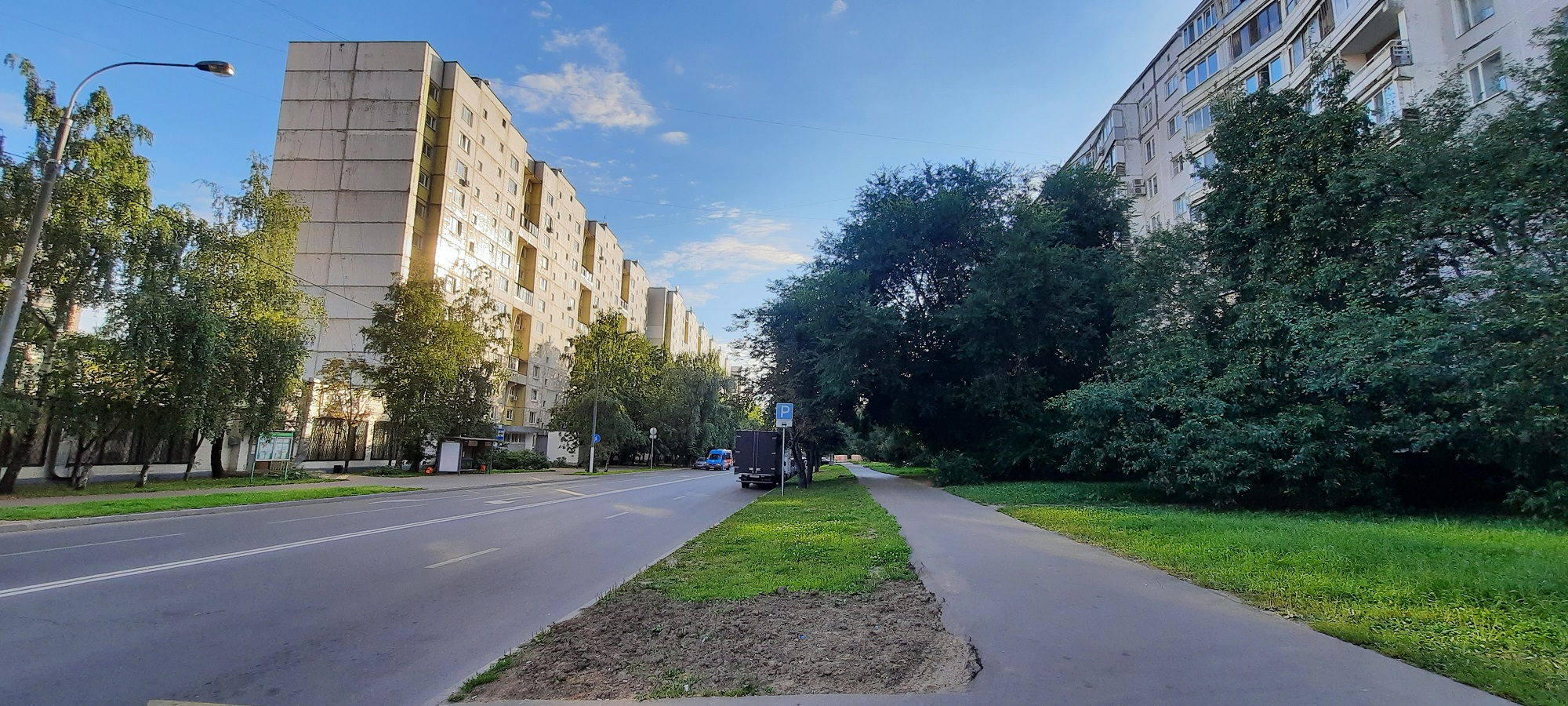
Moscow, Chelyabinskaya street

Chelyabinskaya Street is located in the residential community of Yuzhnoye Izmaylovo in the Eastern Administrative Okrug of Moscow. The street was built in the mid 1970s as a central street for Yuzhnoye Izmaylovo. Named in 1975 for the city of Chelyabinsk, the regional center of Russia, due to its location in the east of Moscow.

== Description ==
The street runs for 1 kilometre (0.62 mi) from Bolshoi Kupavensky Proezd at its western end to Maliy Kupavensky Proezd, 500 metres (1,600 ft) west of the Moscow Beltway (MKAD). Four district schools are situated along the street (#689, opened in 1978; #377; #447, opened in 1982; and #350, opened in 1986). There are two 16-story buildings, Celybinskaya 11 and 19, built in 1977–1979, and a post office and supermarket. Local transportation is offered by the bus network, which allows residents to connect to the nearby Metro stations (Pervomayskaya: buses 97, 664; Novogireyevo: bus 276; and Shosse Entuziastov: buses 214, 663, and 702). The zip code for all addresses on the street is 105568.
