= Matvey Kuzmin =

Hero of the Soviet Union

- Матвей Кузьмич Кузьмин
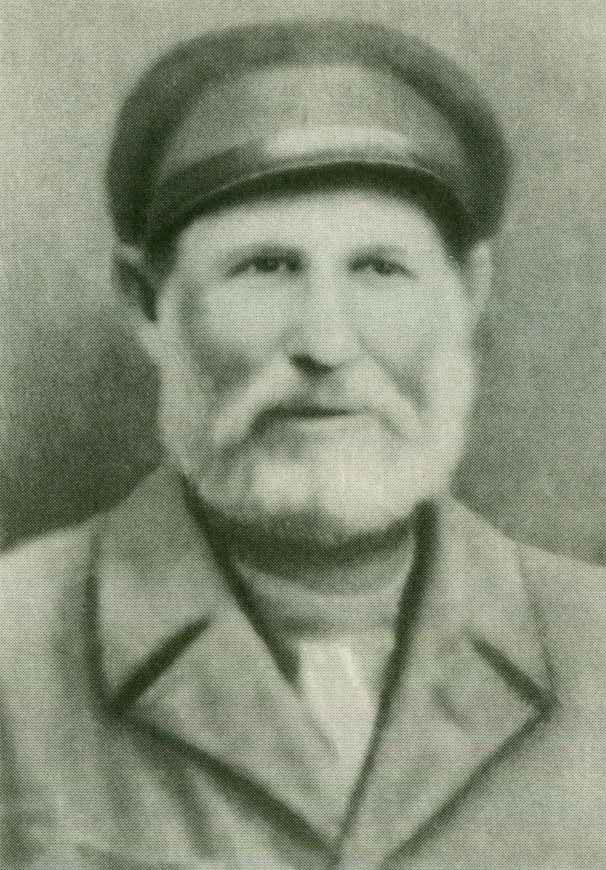
- Born: 3 August 1858; Kurakino, Velikoluksky District, Pskov Governorate, Russian Empire
- Died: 14 February 1942 (aged 83); Soviet Union
- Military career
- Allegiance: Soviet Union
- Awards: Hero of the Soviet Union

Matvey Kuzmich Kuzmin (Russian: Матвей Кузьмич Кузьмин, IPA: [mɐˈtvʲej kʊˈzmʲin]; 3 August 1858 – 14 February 1942) was a Russian peasant who was killed in World War II. He was posthumously the oldest person to be named a Hero of the Soviet Union on 8 May 1965 based on his age at death.

== Early life ==
Kuzmin was born in 1858 in the village of Kurakino, in the Velikoluksky District (then Uezd) of Pskov Oblast. He was a self-employed farmer who declined the offer to join a kolkhoz or collective farm. He lived with his grandson and continued to hunt and fish on the territory of the kolkhoz "Rassvet" (Russian: Рассвет, 'Dawn'). He was nicknamed "Biriuk" (lone wolf).

== Malkino Heights ==
Kuzmin's home region was occupied by the forces of Nazi Germany in World War II. In February 1942, he helped house a German battalion in the village of Kurakino. The German unit was ordered to pierce the Soviet defense in the area of Velikiye Luki by advancing into the rear of the Soviet troops dug in at Malkino Heights.

On 13 February 1942, the German commander asked the 83-year-old Kuzmin to guide his men and offered Kuzmin money, flour, kerosene, and a Sauer & Sohn hunting rifle. Kuzmin agreed, but on learning of the proposed route, sent his grandson Vasilij to Pershino (6 km from Kurakino) to warn the Soviet troops and to propose an ambush near the village of Malkino. During the night, Kuzmin guided the German units through roundabout ways, leading them to the outskirts of Malkino at dawn. There the village defenders and the 2nd battalion of 31st Cadet Rifle Brigade of the Kalinin Front attacked. The German battalion came under heavy machine gun fire and suffered losses of about 50 killed and 20 captured. Among the chaos, a German officer had realized what had happened and turned his pistol towards Kuzmin and shot him twice. Kuzmin died during the skirmish. Three days later Kuzmin was buried with military honors. Subsequently he was reburied at the military cemetery of Velikiye Luki.

== Legacy ==
Kuzmin's death became known through an article in Pravda, by Boris Polevoy. Polevoy was a military correspondent in that area and attended Kuzmin's funeral. In 1948 Polevoy wrote the children's story The Last Day of Matvey Kuzmin, which is still included in Russian school readings for third grade.

Kuzmin's self-sacrifice, which was compared with that of Ivan Susanin, earned him the posthumous honour of being named a Hero of the Soviet Union.

External image
- Statue of Kuzmin in the foyer of the Partizanskaya metro station in Moscow

Throughout the Soviet Union, streets were named in his honour. A Soviet naval trawler was also named for him.

In 1943, a statue to him was raised in a Moscow Metro station Izmailovsky Park, now Partizanskaya, which was designed by the Soviet sculptor Matvey Manizer.

== See also ==
- Ivan Susanin
- Toropets-Kholm Operation
