= Monument to Lenin in Luzhniki =

Statue in Moscow

Monument to Lenin
- Памятник Ленину
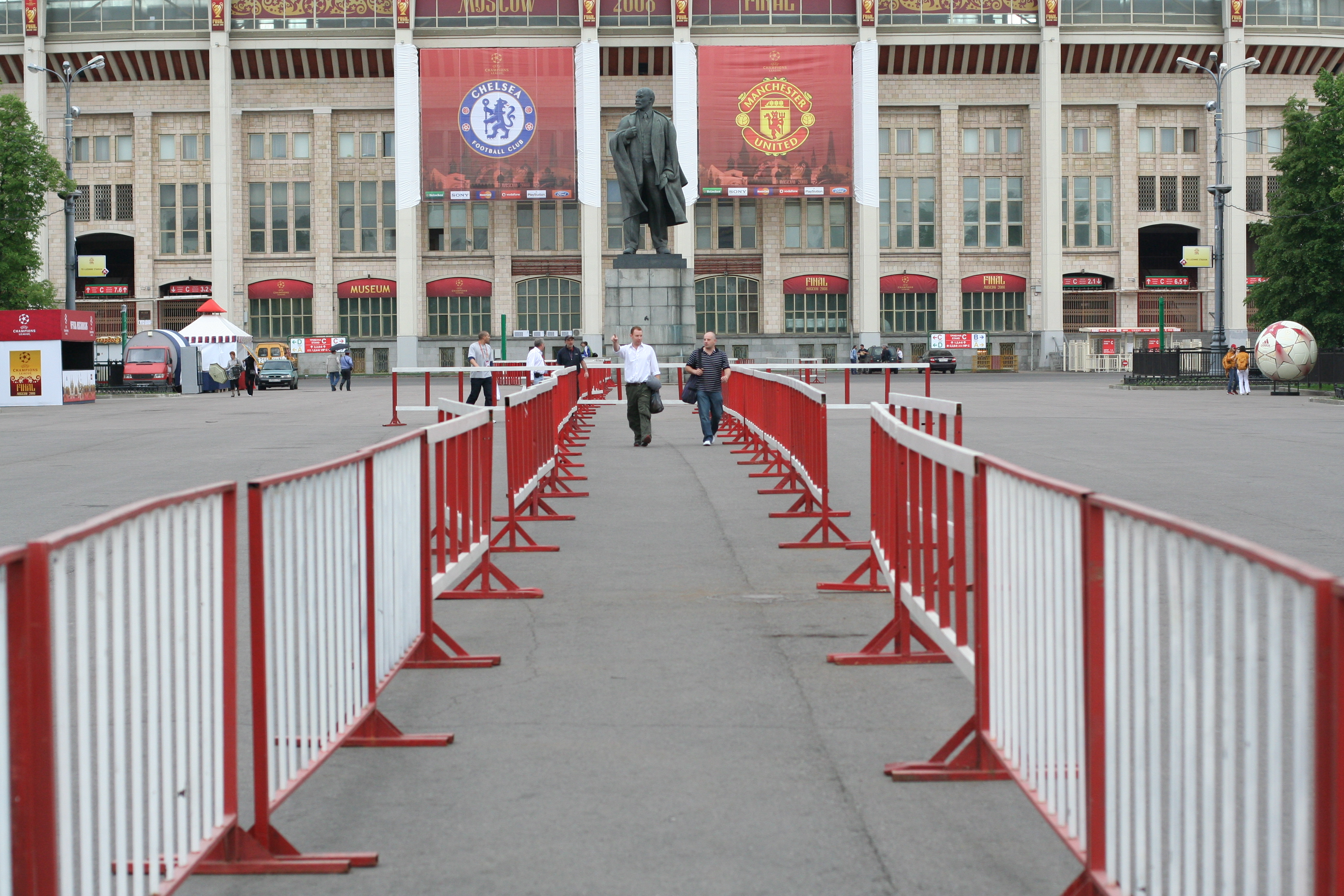
- Location: Luzhniki Stadium, Moscow
- Coordinates: 55.716896°N 37.555889°E
- Designer: Igor Rozhin
- Completion date: 1960
- Opening date: 1960

The monument to Lenin in Luzhniki (Russian: Памятник Ленину) is a statue of Vladimir Lenin outside the Luzhniki Stadium in Moscow. It was installed in 1960 on the square in front of the central entrance of the stadium. The designers of the monument are the sculptor Matvey Manizer and the architect Igor Rozhin. The monument has the status of an identified cultural heritage site.

== History and description ==
Sculptor Matvey Manizer designed a monument to Vladimir Lenin, which was placed in Ulyanovsk in 1940. Manizer made a variant of this statue in 1958 for the central hall of the Soviet pavilion at the 1958 World's Fair in Brussels, for which he was awarded an Honorary Diploma. After the completion of the exhibition, the All-Union Chamber of Commerce at the request of the Mossoviet executive committee transferred this sculpture to Moscow. The statue was installed on the pedestal in front of the central entrances of the Luzhniki Stadium (at that time the Central Lenin Stadium). The unveiling of the monument took place on 22 April 1960, the 90th anniversary of the birth of V. I. Lenin.

The eight-meter bronze statue of Lenin is installed on a stepped pedestal of gray polished granite. Lenin stands bareheaded in a long coat. The coat is depicted as fluttering in the wind, forming folds. The gaze of the leader of the revolution is directed into the distance.
