= Yuzhnoye Izmaylovo =

Coordinates: 55°46′40″N 37°49′52″E

Yuzhnoye Izmaylovo (Russian: Ю́жное Изма́йлово, Southern Izmaylovo) is an area located in the eastern part of Moscow, Russia, just north of the Shosse Entuziastov (шоссе Энтузиастов) Route and west of the Moscow Ring Highway (МКАД). It borders Izmaylovo District in the south and Izmaylovsky Park in the north and west. In 1960, it became a part of Moscow, after all territories inside the Moscow Ring Highway were incorporated into Moscow proper.

Yuzhnoye Izmaylovo is in one of the green areas of Moscow. Izmaylovsky Park, one of the largest forested urban areas in Europe, is right across the street. Yuzhnoye Izmaylovo was built in the mid-1970s, initially as an Olympic Village for the 1980 Moscow Olympics. Yuzhnoye Izmaylovo would later be converted into a bedroom community, a microdistrict for the fast-growing population of the city. Yuzhnoye Izmaylovo is less than an hour away from the center of the city by public transportation (bus and Moscow Metro).

== Streets ==
- Bolshoy Kupavensky Drive — Большой Купавенский проезд
- Maly Kupavensky Drive — Малый Купавенский проезд
- Chelyabinskaya Street — Челябинская улица
- Chechulina Street — Улица Чечулина (former Srednii (Middle) Kupavensky Drive)
- Magnitogorskaya Street — Магнитогорская улица
