= Monument to Vasily Chapaev (Samara) =

Coordinates: 53.197008°N 50.096956°E

Monument to Vasily Chapaev – is a monument to Vasily Ivanovich Chapaev in Samara, installed in Chapaev Square in front of the drama theatre.

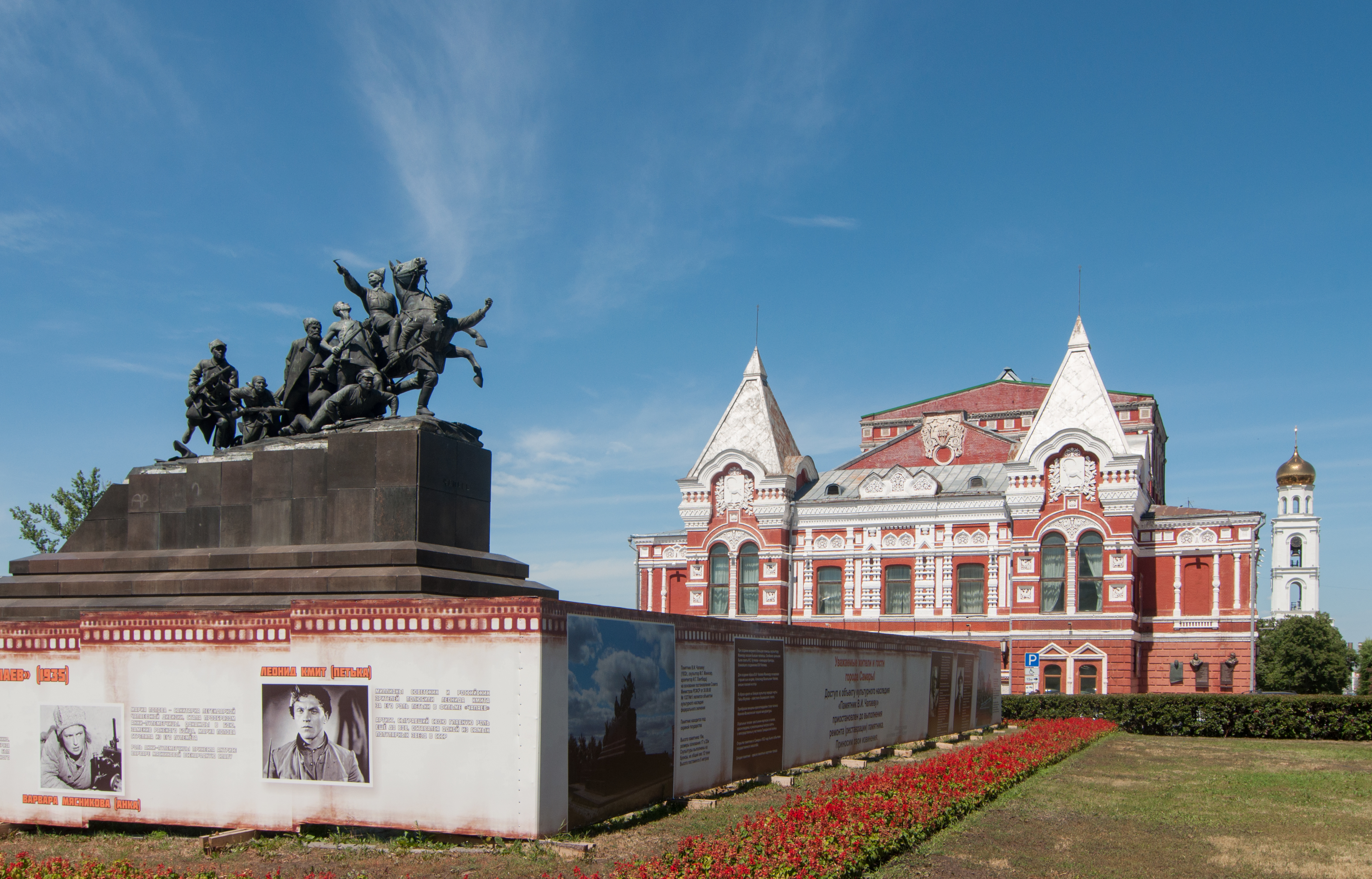
Monument to Chapaev and the drama theatre

== History ==
The monument was erected in 1932 to commemorate 15th anniversary of October Revolution and was designed by architect Iosif Langbard and sculptor Matvey Manizer (who also created monuments to Valerian Kuybishev and Vladimir Lenin in Samara). Manizer was the first sculptor in the history of the Soviet art who decided to attempt creating a multi-figure equestrian sculpture. Amongst the figures are a commissar, a Bashkir soldier, a partisan peasant, a Tatar soldier in a torn shirt, a female in headscarf, a sailor and Chapaev on horseback with a sabre. Characters of the monument are based on real participants of the civil war.

To help create Chapaev’s facial features Manizer used as a model Chapaev’s son, Alexander, who looked much like his father. To create the character of the Red Army Bashkir soldier, raising from the ground, the sculptor used as a model a student of Leningrad Military Medical Academy and Bashkir poet Gaisa Yusupov.

At the time of the monument creation it was one of the biggest in the country (height 10m, base 17 x 22m). The pedestal, plated with polished black labradorite, contains a plaque with a quote from Vladimir Lenin:

Fight till the last drop of blood, comrades! Hold on to every sliver of land! Persevere till the very end! Victory is close, - victory will be ours!

- Lenin, 1919

Weight of the bronze, used for casting, was 12 tonnes, figures are 1.5 times the average human height.

== Copy ==
The monument was made in Leningrad, before its shipment it was seen by Kirov, who asked its author to make a copy for Leningrad. A copy of the monument was made in 1933, it is now in Saint Petersburg in a square in front of Budyonny Military Academy of the Signal Corps.

== Links ==
- Monument to Vasily Chapaev
- Monument to Vasily Chapaev and his army
