= Pervomayskaya (Moscow Metro) =

Moscow Metro station

Pervomayskaya Первомайская
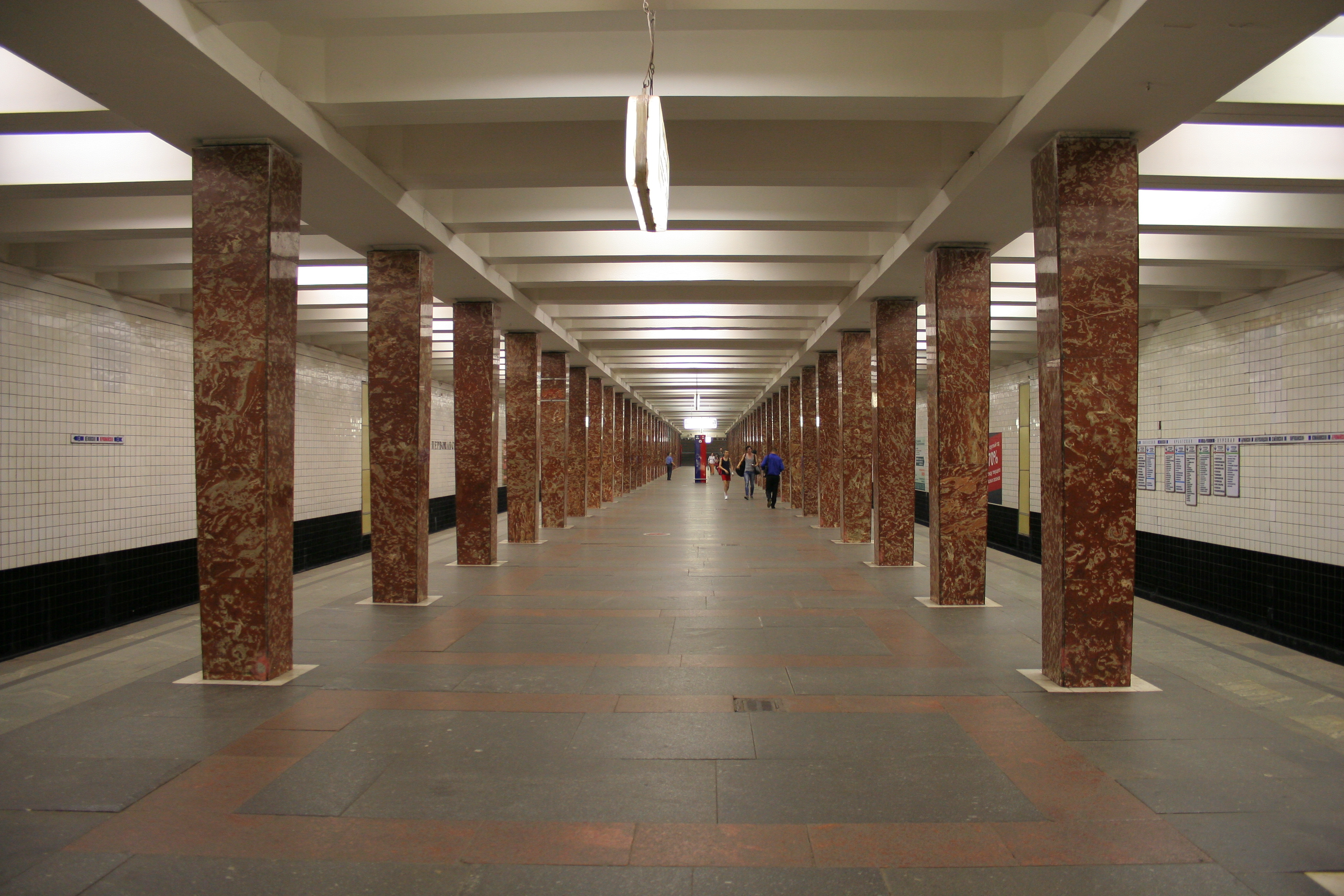

General information
- Location: Pervomayskaya Street, Izmaylovo District, Eastern Administrative Okrug; Moscow; Russia
- Coordinates: 55.7948°N 37.7993°E
- System: Moscow Metro station
- Owner: Moskovsky Metropoliten
- Line: Arbatsko-Pokrovskaya line
- Platforms: 1 island platform
- Tracks: 2
- Connections: Bus: т22, т51, т55, 15, 223, 257, 634, 645, 664, 974, н3 'Tram: 11, 12, 34

Construction
- Depth: 7 metres (23 ft)
- Platform levels: 1
- Parking: No

Other information
- Station code: 052

History
- Opened: 21 October 1961; 64 years ago

Services
Preceding station	Moscow Metro	Following station
Izmaylovskaya towards Pyatnitskoye Shosse	Arbatsko-Pokrovskaya line	Shchyolkovskaya Terminus
Route map
Location
- Location within Moscow Metro

Pervomayskaya (Russian: Первомайская) is a Moscow Metro station in the Izmaylovo District, Eastern Administrative Okrug, Moscow. It is on the Arbatsko-Pokrovskaya Line, between Izmaylovskaya and Shchyolkovskaya stations.

Before the current station opened on 21 October 1961, Pervomayskaya referred to the temporary station located in the Izmaylovo depot near the present-day Izmaylovskaya.

== History ==
The station was the first to be built to the standard column tri-span design which would from then become the most widespread in Moscow Metro and in other ex-USSR cities, with slightly flared red marble pillars and tiled walls. The architects were M. F. Markovsky and Ya. V. Tatarzhinskaya.

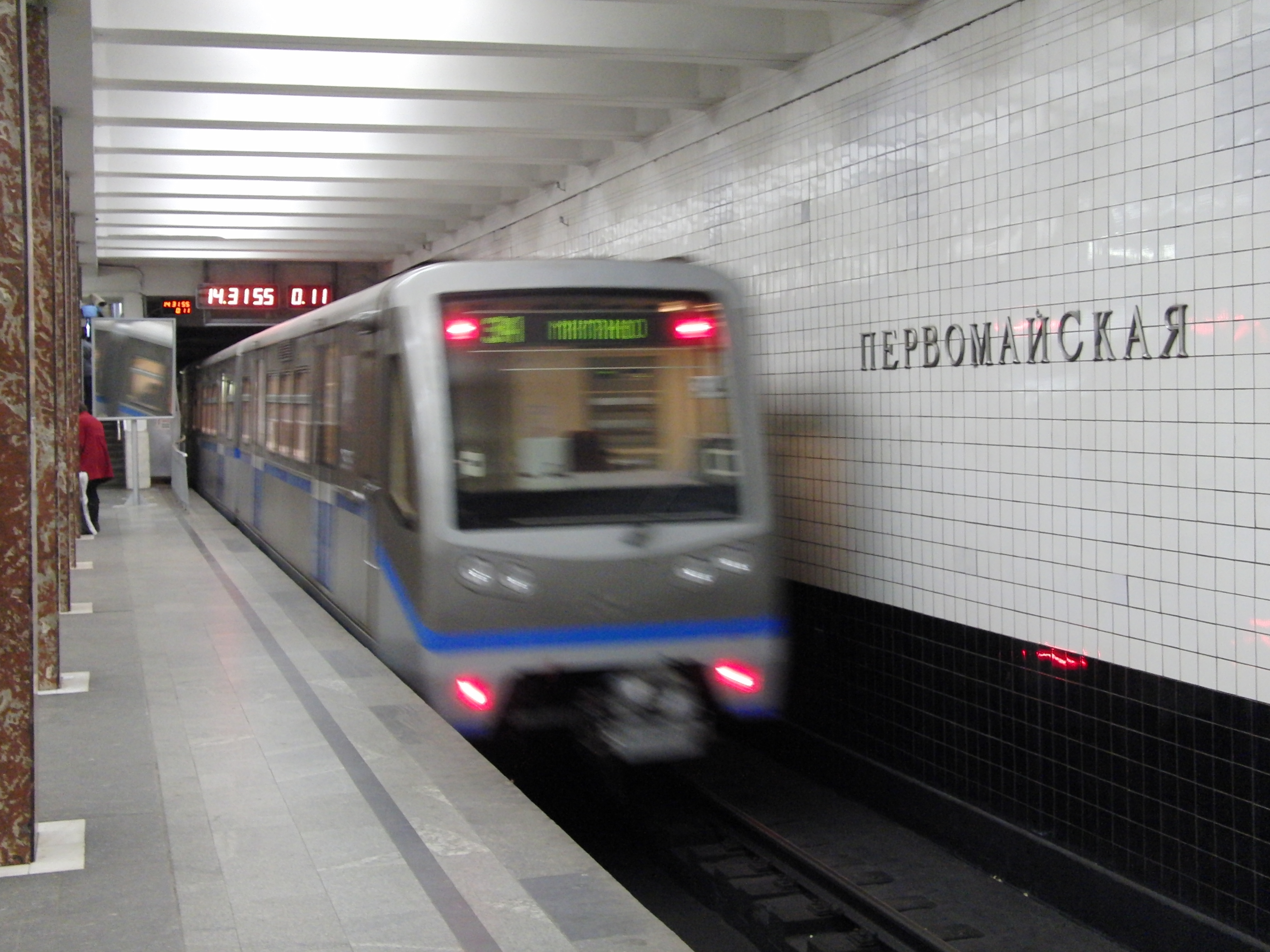
Departing train

The Pervomayskaya (translated Pokrovsky radius) from metro Revolution Square to Izmailovsky Park remained virtually unchanged from the start of design to the end of its construction. In the early designs of the 1930s, Pervomayskaya after the station "Izmailovskaya" (now " Partizanskaya ") was supposed to turn north along the banks of Serebryano-Vinogradny Pond and Nikitinskaya Street. In Golyanovo, north of the Shchelkovo highway and east of the Okruzhnaya railway, it was supposed to place an electric depot, which was connected by a ground line to the Nikitinskaya Street ground station. The site was supposed to pass south of the Silver-Grape Pond, then turn north. In the early 1940s, the depot was moved to the southeast of the pond, where it was later built . On September 24, 1954, the Arbatsko-Pokrovskaya line was extended to the Pervomaiskaya station, which was placed on the territory of the electric depot.

The current "Pervomaiskaya" (With the design name "11th Parkovaya") was first included in the prospective line scheme adopted on February 22, 1957. Construction was carried out in an open way. After the opening of the section with the Izmailovsky Park and Pervomaiskaya stations, on October 21, 1961, the Pervomaiskaya station located in the Izmailovo electric depot was closed. As a result, the Moscow Metro has 60 stations. Until July 22, 1963, when the line was extended to the north to the Shchelkovskaya station, it was the final one.

On January 8, 1977, on an open stretch between the Izmailovskaya and Pervomaiskaya stations, an explosion occurred that claimed the lives of 7 people.
