= Izmailovo Hotel =

Hotel in Moscow, Russia

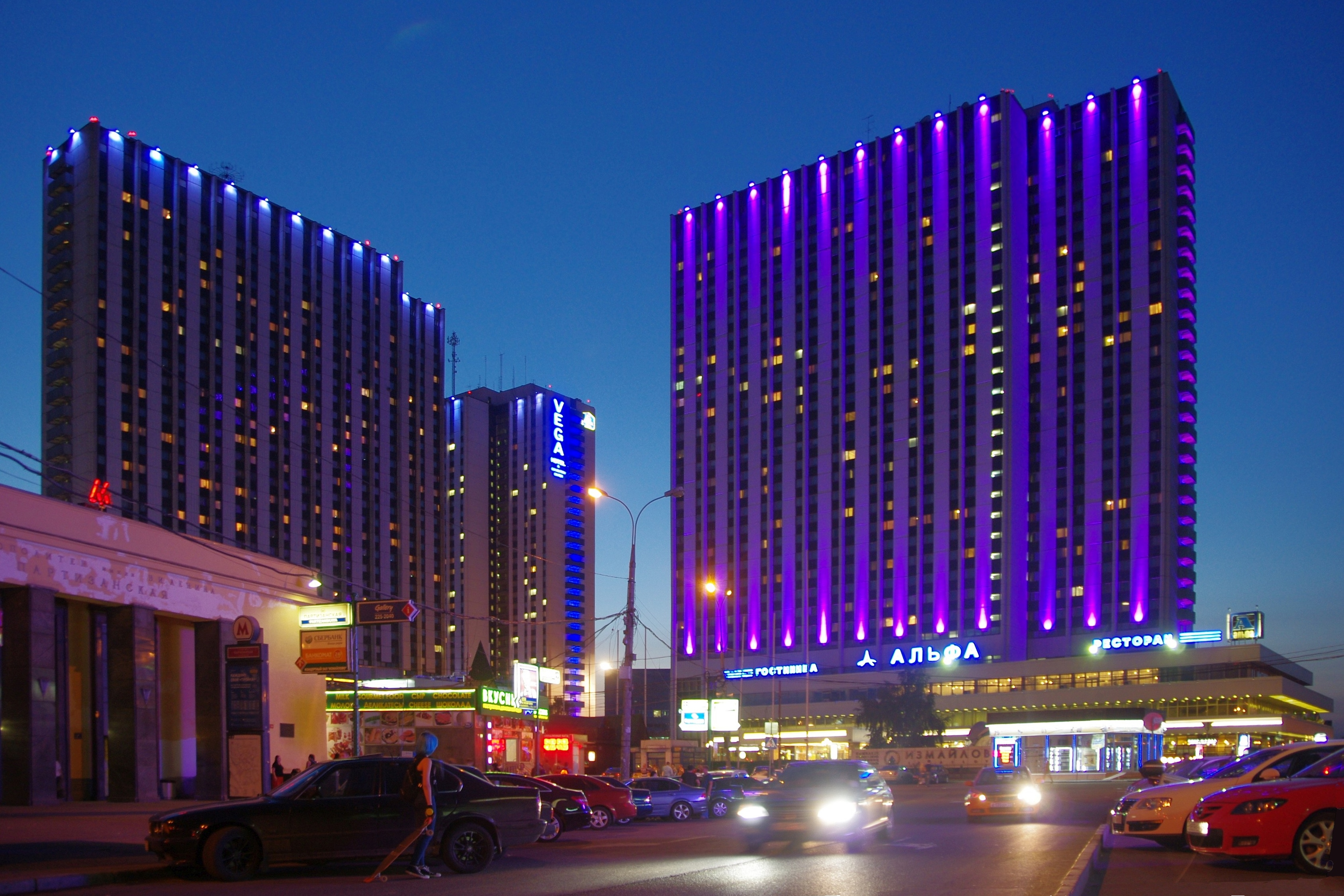

General information
- Type: Hotel
- Location: Izmaylovo District, Moscow, Russia, Izmaylovskoye Shosse 71
- Opened: 1980

Website
- izmailovo-hotels.ru/en.html

The Izmailovo Hotel (Russian: Гостиничный комплекс «Измайлово») is a four-building hotel located in the Izmaylovo District of Moscow, Russia. It is the largest hotel in Europe, and was the largest hotel in the world from 1980 to 1993. Built for the 1980 Summer Olympics to accommodate sportsmen and visitors, the hotel remains popular among Russians and foreign guests.

== History ==
This hotel was part of the planning for the 1980 Summer Olympics and was the biggest in the world at the time. it surpassed the Rossiya Hotel (1967–2006) as the largest hotel in the world. It held the record until 1993, when it was surpassed by MGM Grand Las Vegas. Today, Izmailovo Hotel is still the largest hotel in Europe with 5,000 rooms divided between four buildings: Alpha, Beta, Vega and Gamma-Delta.

== Gallery ==
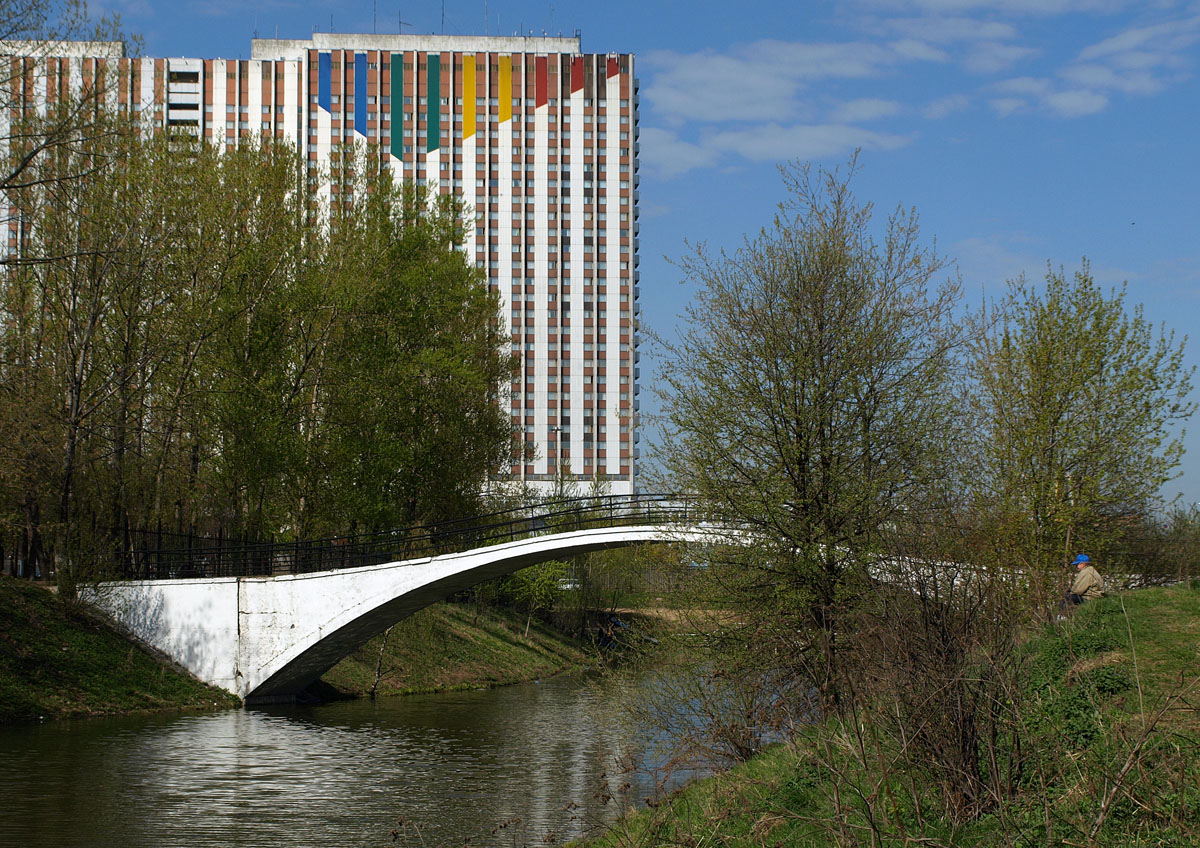
View from Izmaylovsky island

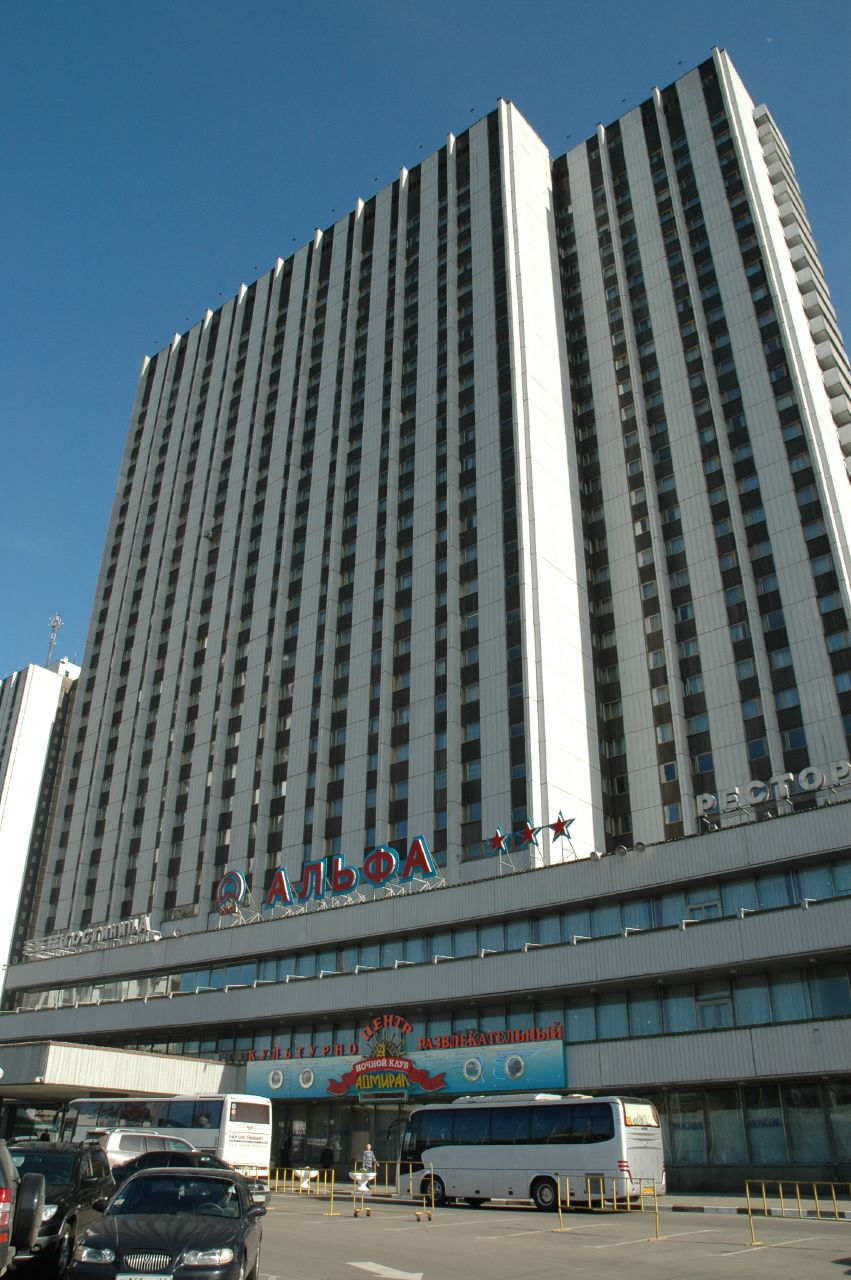
Hotel Alpha

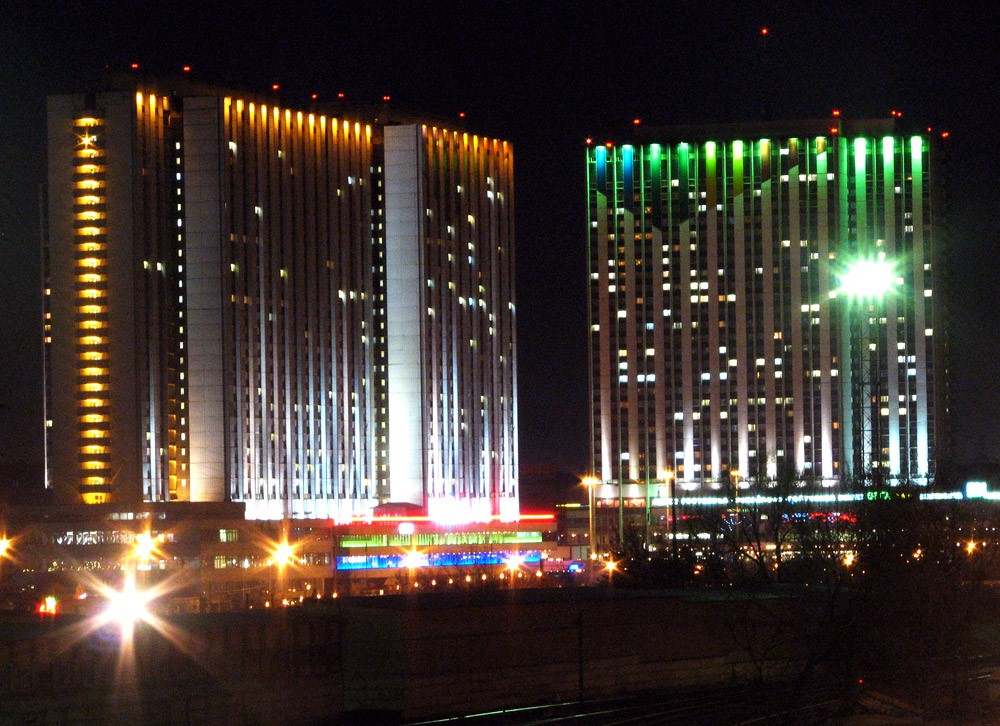
Main pedestrian street and Izmailovo Hotel

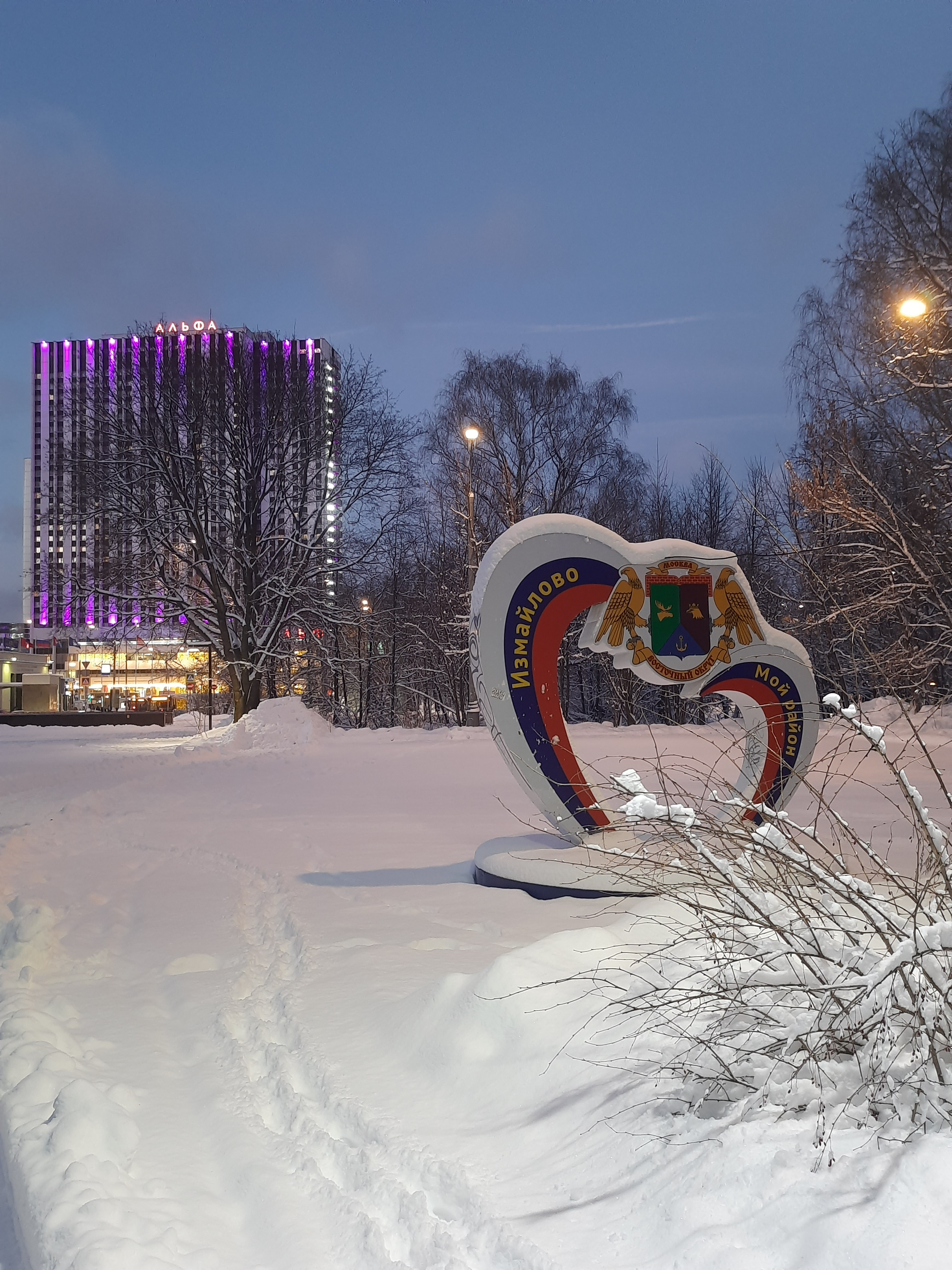
The hotel in 2022

== See also ==
- Tourism in Russia
- List of largest hotels
- List of largest hotels in Europe
