= Genrikh Genrikhovich Manizer =

Russian ethnographer

Genrikh Manizer
- Генрих Манизер
- Born: 3 October 1889; Saint Petersburg, Russian Empire
- Died: July 4, 1917 (aged 27)
- Relatives: Matvey Manizer (brother)

Genrikh Genrikhovich Manizer (Russian: Генрих Генрихович Манизер; 3 October [O.S. 21 September] 1889 – 4 July [O.S. 21 June] 1917) was a Russian ethnographer who, among other works, produced valuable ethnographic monographs regarding two indigenous peoples of Brazil in 1914 and 1915.

The ethnographer, whose name is transliterated into the Latin script as H.H. Manizer or Henrich Henrikhovitch Manizer, was born in 1889, and was the most important member of the second Russian expedition to South America. Manizer spent six months with the Krenak (also known as Aimoré or Botocudos) in Minas Gerais and for three months with the Kaingang in São Paulo (between 1914 and 1915).

In Brazil (and in Russia) he also carried out documentary research on the first Russian expedition to Brazil, the Langsdorff Expedition(1821-1829), producing the first historical works regarding it (this text remained unedited for three decades after Manizer's death).

The outbreak of World War I in Europe cut Manizer's trip short. He died on the western front from typhus (according to Strelnikov, another member of the Brazilian expedition).

Manizer's ethnographic work about the Kaingang was first published in a French translation (Les Kaingang de Sao Paulo) by Strelnikov, in 1930 (International Congress of Americanists, in New York); it was only published in Brazil in 2006, as Os Kaingang de São Paulo (http://www.curtnimuendaju.com.br/livros/os-kaingang-de-s-o-paulo.html), due to efforts of Editora Curt Nimuendajú, in a translation by Juracilda Veiga.
