= List of largest hotels =

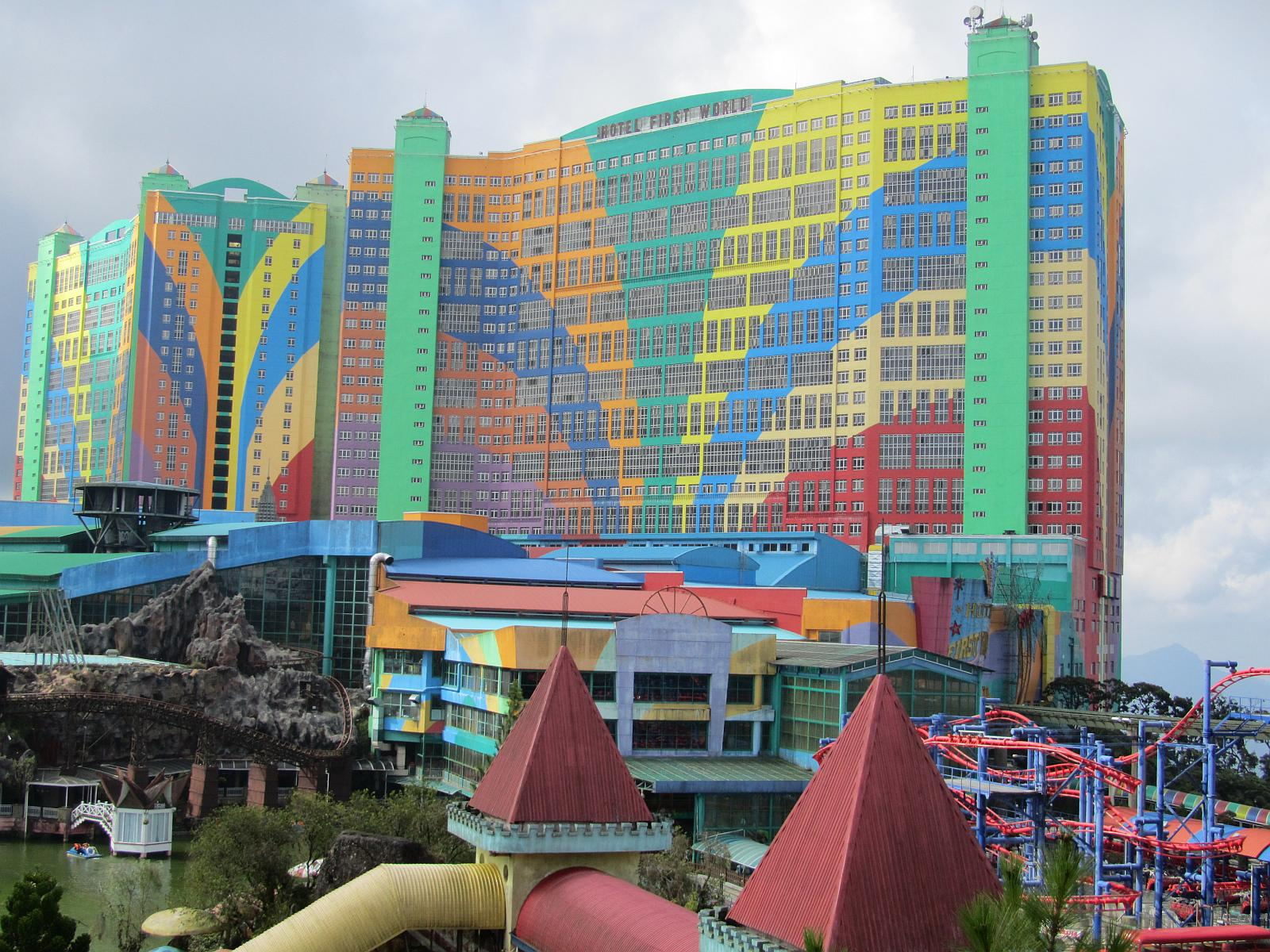
First World Hotel in Genting Highlands, Pahang, Malaysia is the largest hotel in the world.

This is a list of hotels that have 3,000 or more guest accommodation rooms. Since 2020, the largest hotel in the world is the First World Hotel in Pahang, Malaysia with 7,351 rooms divided between three buildings. The largest single hotel building is the MGM Grand Las Vegas, with 4,762 rooms in one building.

== Largest hotels in the world ==
#	Name	Country/Region	City	Rooms
1	First World Hotel	Malaysia	Genting Highlands	7,351
2	The Venetian Resort (Note: Three buildings: The Venetian North Tower, The Palazzo and Venetian South Tower.)	United States	Las Vegas	7,264
3	The Clock Towers	Saudi Arabia	Mecca	6,000
4	The Londoner Macao	Macau	Cotai	6,000
5	Izmailovo Hotel	Russia	Moscow	5,000
6	MGM Grand Las Vegas	United States	Las Vegas	4,762
7	Wynn Las Vegas & Encore Resort (Note: Two buildings: Wynn & Encore.)	United States	Las Vegas	4,748
8	Barkhatnye Sezony (Note: Built for the 2014 Winter Olympics.)	Russia	Sochi	4,688
9	Mandalay Bay Resort and Casino (Note: Two buildings: Mandalay Bay and W.)	United States	Las Vegas	4,426
10	Luxor Las Vegas	United States	Las Vegas	4,407
11	Ambassador City Jomtien	Thailand	Pattaya	4,219
12	Aria Resort & Casino	United States	Las Vegas	4,004
13	Sheraton Grand Macao	Macau	Cotai	4,001
14	Excalibur Hotel and Casino	United States	Las Vegas	3,981
15	Caesars Palace	United States	Las Vegas	3,970
16	Bellagio	United States	Las Vegas	3,933
17	Circus Circus Las Vegas	United States	Las Vegas	3,773
18	Shinagawa Prince Hotel	Japan	Tokyo	3,680
19	Paris Las Vegas	United States	Las Vegas	3,672
20	Fontainebleau Las Vegas	United States	Las Vegas	3,644
21	Resorts World Las Vegas	United States	Las Vegas	3,506
22	Flamingo Las Vegas	United States	Las Vegas	3,460
23	Galaxy Macau	Macau	Cotai	3,458
24	Atlantis Paradise Island	Bahamas	Paradise Island	3,414
25	Moon Palace Golf & Spa Resort	Mexico	Cancún	3,407
26	Hilton Hawaiian Village	United States	Honolulu	3,386
27	Disney's Port Orleans Resort	United States	Lake Buena Vista	3,056
28	The Cosmopolitan	United States	Las Vegas	3,027
29	The Venetian Macao	Macau	Cotai	3,000

== See also ==
- List of largest hotels in Europe
- List of tallest hotels
- Lists of hotels
- List of motels
- List of integrated resorts
