= Partizanskaya (Moscow Metro) =

Moscow Metro station

Partizanskaya Партизанская
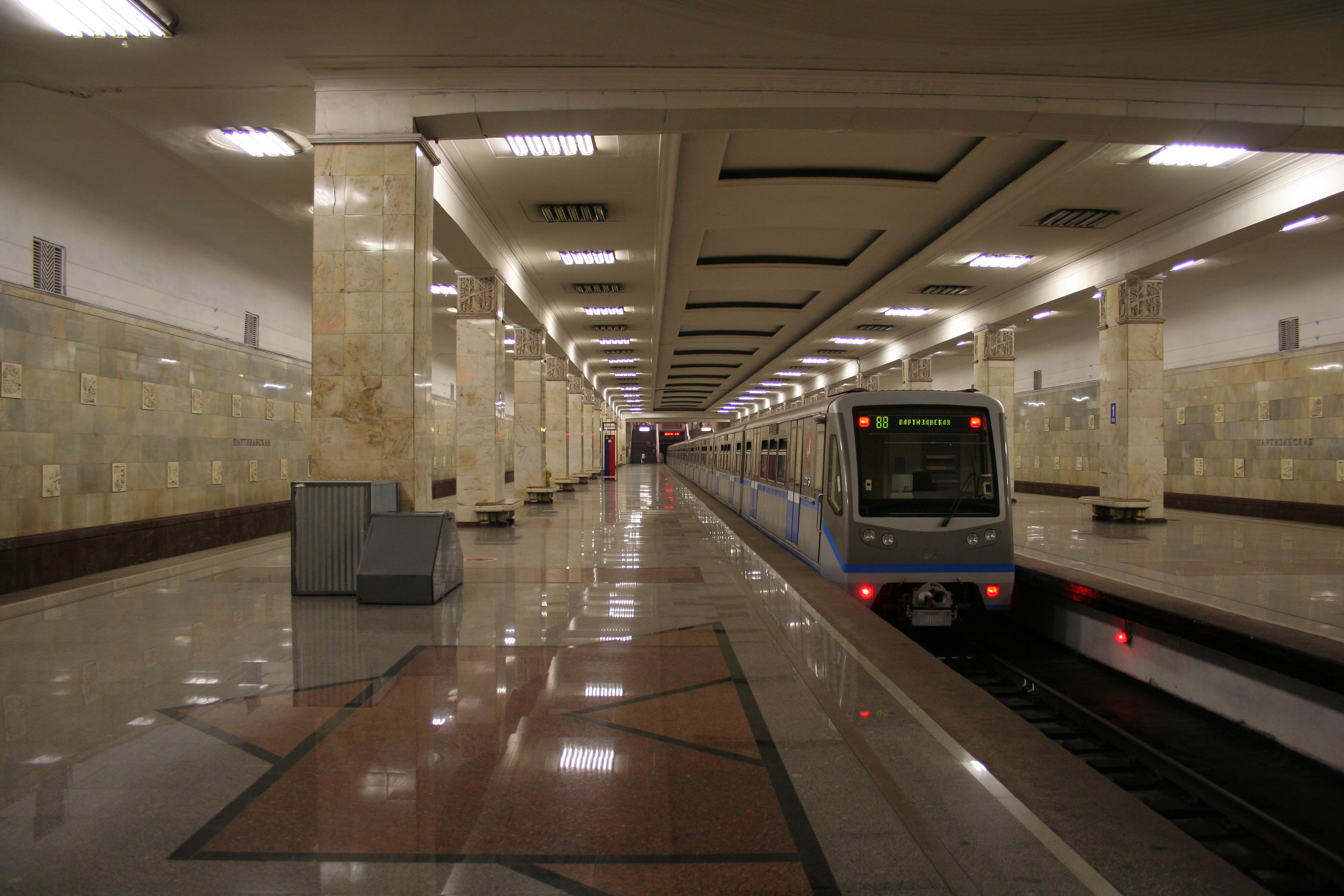

General information
- Location: Izmaylovo District; Eastern Administrative Okrug; Moscow; Russia
- Coordinates: 55.7886°N 37.7506°E
- System: Moscow Metro station
- Owner: Moskovsky Metropoliten
- Line: Arbatsko-Pokrovskaya line
- Platforms: 2
- Tracks: 3

Construction
- Structure type: Shallow column station
- Depth: 9 metres (30 ft)
- Platform levels: 1
- Parking: No

Other information
- Station code: 050

History
- Opened: 18 January 1944; 82 years ago

Services
Preceding station	Moscow Metro	Following station
Semyonovskaya towards Pyatnitskoye Shosse	Arbatsko-Pokrovskaya line	Izmaylovskaya towards Shchyolkovskaya
Out-of-station interchange
Lokomotiv anticlockwise / outer	Moscow Central Circle transfer at Izmaylovo	Sokolinaya Gora clockwise / inner
Route map
Location
- Location within Moscow Metro

Partizanskaya (Russian: Партизанская, IPA: [pərtʲɪˈzanskəjə]), known until 2005 as Izmailovsky Park (Измайловский парк), is a station on the Arbatsko-Pokrovskaya Line of the Moscow Metro. It was built during World War II, opened in 1944 and is dedicated to the Soviet partisans who resisted the Nazis. The name was changed on the 60th anniversary of the Soviet victory to reflect the theme of the station better. The station's design was the work of the architect Vilenskiy.

Partizanskaya is an unusual three-track layout, with two island platforms. The rarely-used centre track was built to handle crowds from a nearby stadium that was planned but never built because of the war. There is one row of pillars per platform. Both the walls and pillars of the station are faced with white marble and decorated with bas-reliefs honouring the partisans. The two pillars closest to the exit stairs are adorned with statues: Zoya Kosmodemyanskaya on the left and Matvey Kuzmin on the right.

The circular ceiling niche at the foot of the stairs originally contained a fresco by A.D. Goncharov, but it has since been painted over. At the top of the stairs is a sculptural group by Matvey Manizer entitled "Partisans" and bearing the inscription "To partisans and partisan glory!".

Station's original name was "Izmailovsky park kul'tury i otdyha imeni Stalina" (English: Stalin Ismailovsky Park of Culture and Leisure). It was changed to "Izmailovskaya" in 1948. In 1961, new station, named "Izmailovsky Park" at the time of its opening, was introduced. And in 1963, names of stations "Izmailovskaya" and "Izmailovsky Park" were switched, reason being which station was closer to the actual park's main entrance.

The 2005's rename to "Partizanskaya" has been mentioned in the open letter of a resigning Moscow's toponymy commission member, as one of a number of then-recent renames with political causes rather than the historical toponymy upholding ones.

== Gallery ==
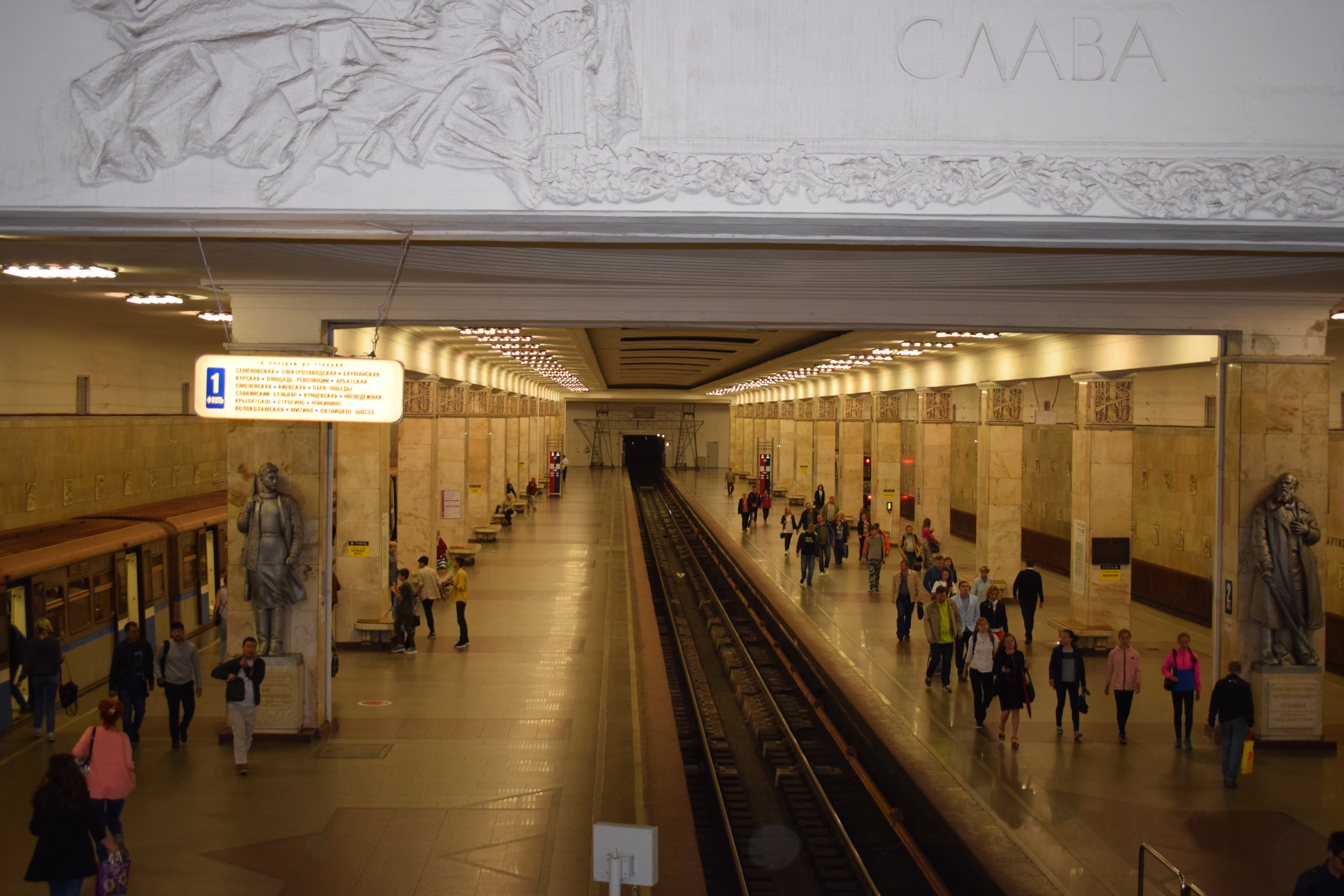
View from the exit stairs, with statues on the left and the right.

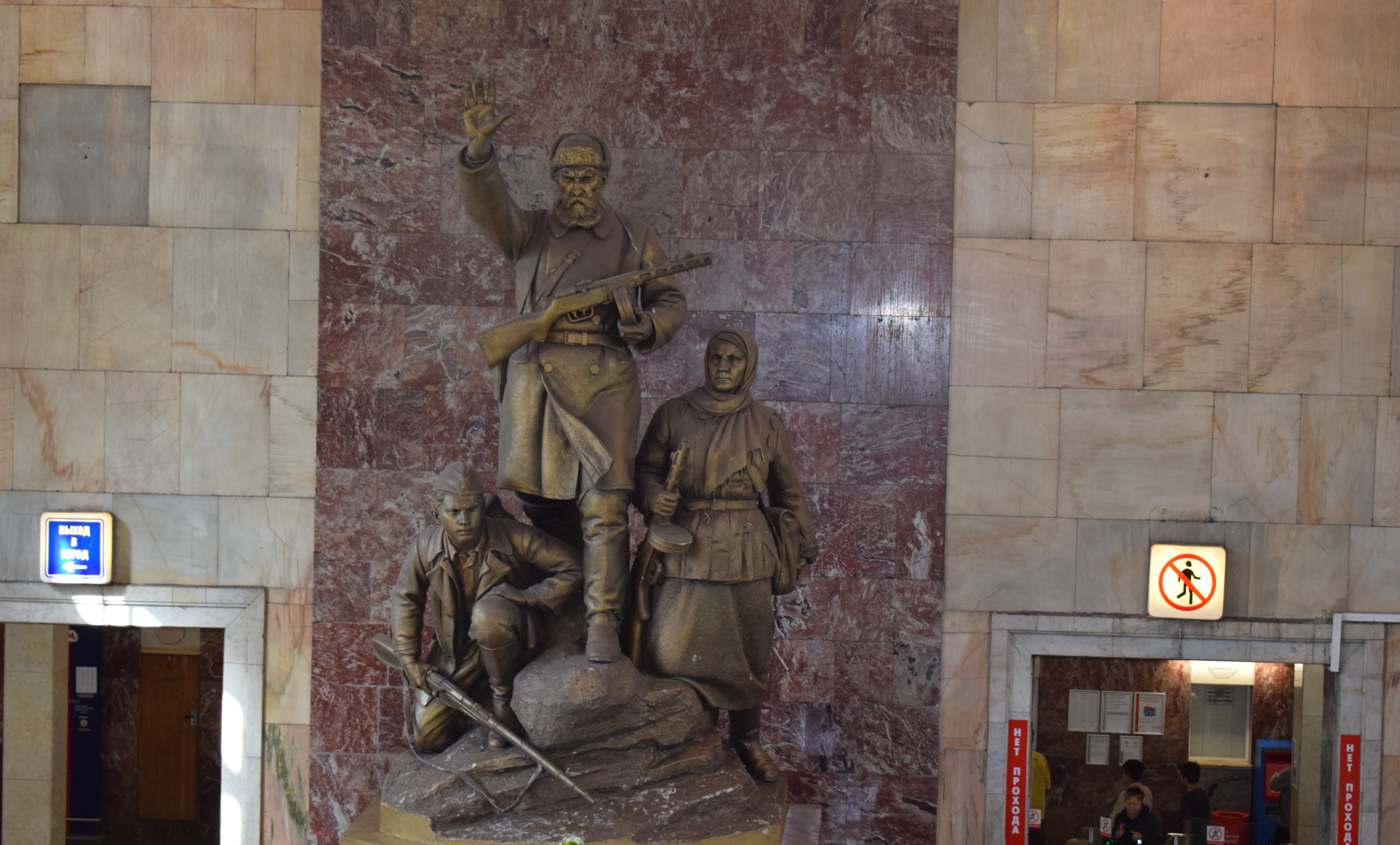
A statue dedicated to the partisans of the Great Patriotic War is near the entrance to the station.
