= Lion Izmailov =

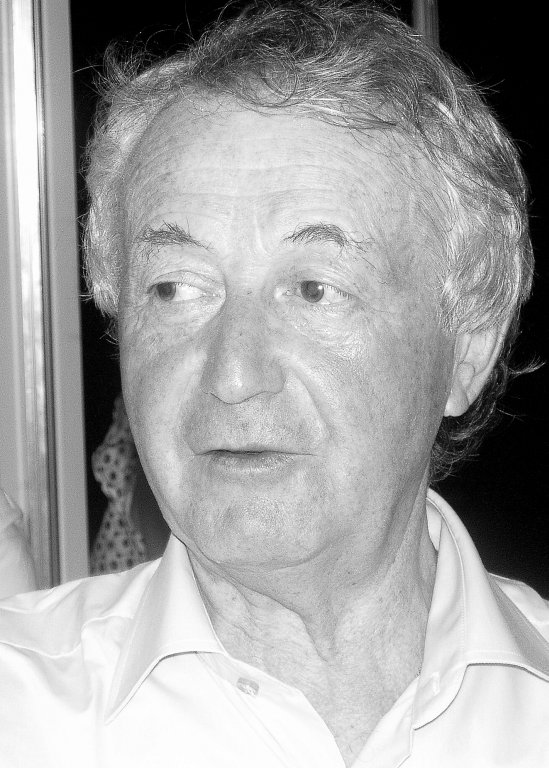
- Born: Lion Moiseevich Polyak; 5 May 1940 (age 86); Moscow, USSR
- Occupations: writer-satirist, screenwriter, entertainer, humorist, TV presenter, poet, poet-songwriter
- Years active: 1970–present
- Spouse: Yelena Sorokina

Lion Izmailov (Russian: Лио́н Изма́йлов), real name Lion Moiseevich Polyak (Russian: Лио́н Моисе́евич По́ляк; born 5 May 1940 in Moscow) is a Soviet and Russian satirist writer, screenwriter and entertainer.

== Biography ==
He was born in Moscow on 5 May 1940 in the family of a construction engineer Moses Aronovich Polyak (1909–1943) and Poly Moiseevna Polyak (1914–1982). At the age of three, he lost his father who died in the war (deputy commander of the battery of the 213th cannon-artillery regiment, Lieutenant Polyak was missing in April 1943), and Lion's upbringing lay on the shoulders of the mother.

In 1960, the future writer graduated from the aviation technical school, and after 2 years of work at one of the enterprises he entered the Moscow Aviation Institute, which he graduated in 1967, receiving the specialty of design engineer. Within the walls of the institute he began to engage in amateur activities, where the pseudonym Izmailov was invented (which meant from MAI, then the letter and was replaced by i).

Published in 1969 in Literaturnaya Gazeta, since then he has been the permanent author of the Club of 12 Chairs column. In 1970 he became a professional writer. In 1973–1975 he studied the profession of a screenwriter (VKSR, workshop of Georgy Danelia). In 1979 he began to perform independently on the stage as a humorist. Member of the Writers' Union of the USSR (1979). He was the host of a number of popular television programs.

Izmailov's monologues are performed by such artists as Gennady Khazanov, Yevgeny Petrosyan, Jan Arlazorov, Svetlana Rozhkova, Efim Shifrin, Vladimir Vinokur, Lev Leshchenko and many others.

Lion Izmailov writes several songs by the singer and composer Alexander Dobronravov.
