= Matvey Manizer =

Russian sculptor

- Матвей Манизер
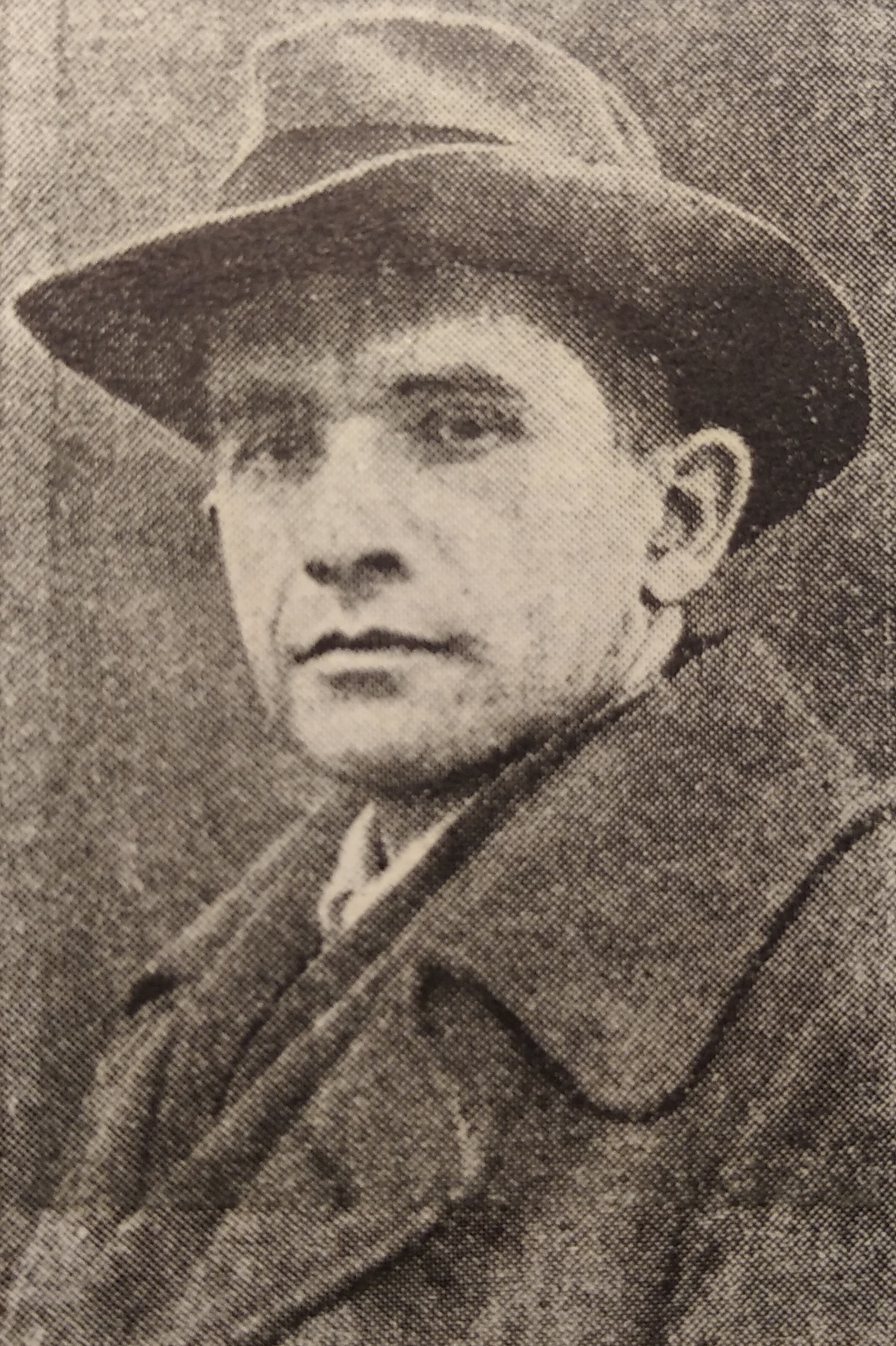
- Born: 17 March [O.S. 5 March] 1891; Saint Petersburg, Russian Empire
- Died: 20 December 1966 (aged 75); Moscow, Soviet Union
- Resting place: Novodevichy Cemetery
- Education: Saint Petersburg State Artistic and Industrial Academy
- Known for: Sculptor
- Style: Socialist realism
- Movement: Academic and realistic
- Spouse: Yelena Yanson-Manizer
- Children: Gugo Manizer
- Relatives: H.H. Manizer (brother)
- Awards: People's Artist of the USSR

Matvey Genrikhovich Manizer (Russian: Матвей Генрихович Манизер; 17 March [O.S. 5 March] 1891 – 20 December 1966) was a Russian sculptor. Manizer created a number of works that became classics of socialist realism.

== Life ==
Manizer was born in Saint Petersburg into the family of Genrikh Manizer (Russian: Генрих Манизер, German: Heinrich Maniser), a prominent Memel-born artist of Baltic German descent.

As a student Manizer attended the Saint Petersburg State Artistic and Industrial Academy, and the art school of the Peredvizhniki from 1911 through 1916. From 1926 he was a member of the Association of Artists of Revolutionary Russia. In 1941 he moved to Moscow.

Working in an academic and realistic style, Manizer produced a great number of monuments situated throughout the Soviet Union, including some twelve portrayals of Lenin. Manizer was awarded the People's Artist of the USSR (1958), Member of USSR Academy of Arts (1947), vice president of USSR Academy of Arts (1947-1966), chairman of the Saint Petersburg Union of Artists from 1937 to 1941, and three-time laureate of the Stalin Prize.

Manizer's wife Yelena Yanson-Manizer (1890-1971) was also sculptor, with her work at Moscow Metro's Dinamo station. Their son, Gugo Manizer (1927-2016), was a noted painter. Among Manizer's students was the Stalin Prize-winning Fuad Abdurakhmanov.

Manizer is buried in Moscow's Novodevichy Cemetery.

== Work ==
- Monument to V. Volodarsky, Prospekt Obukhovskoy Oborony, Leningrad. A 1925 work commemorating Soviet politician V. Volodarsky.
- Monument to the Victims of 9 January 1905, Frunzensky District, Saint Petersburg. A 1932 work commemorating those who died in the 1905 Bloody Sunday massacre.
- Monument to Vasily Chapaev, Samara. A 1932 multi-figure and equestrian sculptural composition commemorating Red Army commander Vasily Chapayev.
- Monument to Lenin, Minsk, 1933.
- 80 bronzes of Soviet citizens for the Moscow Metro station Ploshchad Revolyutsii, 1938
- Monument to Taras Shevchenko, Kharkiv, Ukraine. A 1935 multi-figure sculptural composition commemorating Ukrainian poet and humanist Taras Shevchenko.
- Monument to Valerian Kuybyshev in Samara, 1938
- Monument on the Grave of Taras Shevchenko, Kyiv, Ukraine, 1938.
- Monument to Lenin in Ulyanovsk, 1941, for which Manizer was awarded the Stalin Prize second degree
- Bronze sculptures of the Heroes of the Soviet Union Matvey Kuzmin and Zoya Kosmodemyanskaya in the Moscow Metro station Partizanskaya, 1943, for which Manizer was awarded the Stalin Prize first degree
- Monument to the Metro Builders, in the Moscow Metro station Elektrozavodskaya, 1944
- Bust of Alexander Pokryshkin in Novosibirsk. A 1949 work commemorating twice-Hero of the Soviet Union Alexander Pokryshkin.
- Monument to Ivan Pavlov in Ryazan, 1950, for which Manizer was awarded the Stalin Prize second degree
- Monument to Lenin outside Luzhniki Stadium. A version of his 1940 Ulyanovsk monument to Lenin built for the 1958 World's Fair in Brussels, placed outside the Central Lenin Stadium in 1960.
- Monument to Ilya Repin, Bolotnaya Square, Moscow. A 1958 work commemorating painter Ilya Repin.
- Heroes Monument, Jakarta. A 1963 work commemorating those who fought for Indonesian Independence.
- Monument to Vasily Chapaev, Leningrad. A version of his 1932 work, made in 1933 and installed in 1968.
