= Izmaylovo District =

Izmaylovo District район Измайлово (Russian)
- District
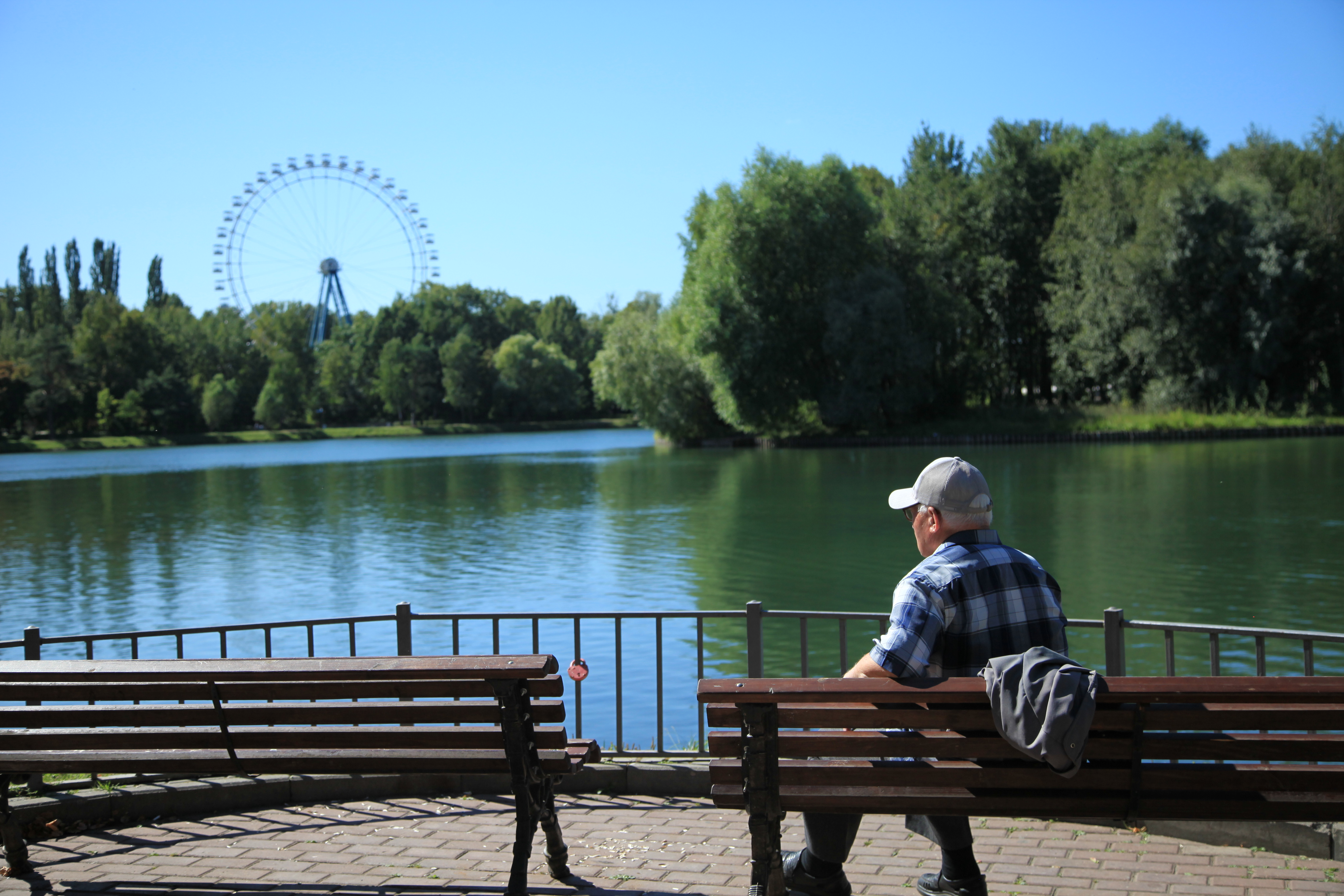
- Visitor in Izmaylovsky Park, Izmaylovsky District

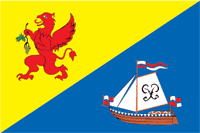
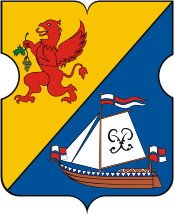
- Flag Coat of arms
- Location of Izmaylovo District in Moscow
- Coordinates: 55°46′37″N 37°44′48″E
- Country: Russia
- Federal subject: Moscow

Population (2010 Census)
  - Total: 102,837
  - Urban: 100%
  - Rural: 0%
- Time zone: UTC+
- OKTMO ID: 45307000
- Website: http://izmaylowo.mos.ru/

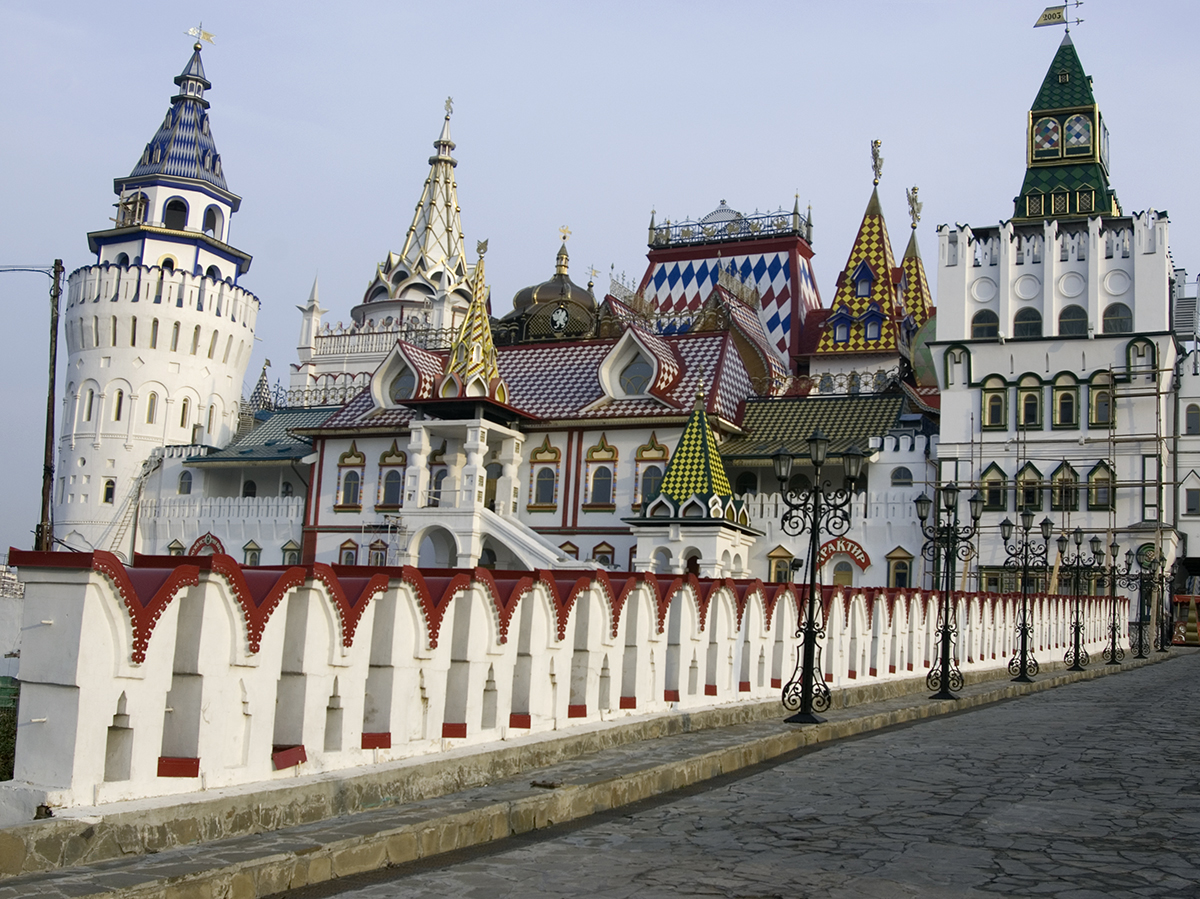
The Kremlin in Izmaylovo District

Izmaylovo District (Russian: райо́н Изма́йлово) is a district in the Eastern Administrative Okrug of the federal city of Moscow, Russia. Population: 102,837 (2010 census); 110,099 (2002 census).

== History ==
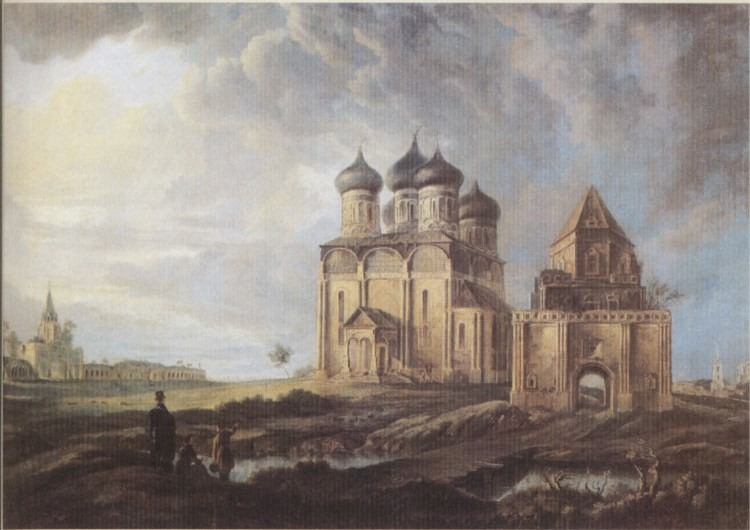
Izmaylovo, painted by K. Bodri, mid-19th century

The history of the village of Izmaylovo goes back to 1389. Since the days of Ivan the Terrible it was an estate of boyars in the Romanov family. In 1654, it was inherited by Alexis of Russia, who built a château on an artificial island around 1664—1690. At about the same time, in 1671—1679, a medieval church was rebuilt into Church of Intercession of the Most Holy Theotokos. The château was later expanded by architects Konstantin Thon and Mikhail Bykovsky into Izmaylovo Estate. It survived the fire of 1812, and is now an outdoor tourist destination.

Peter the Great grew up in Izmaylovo and had been known for sailing a small boat which he discovered in the storage of his great grandfather Nikita Romanov. This boat is now in Central Naval Museum in St. Petersburg, and is credited as the "grandfather of the Russian Navy".

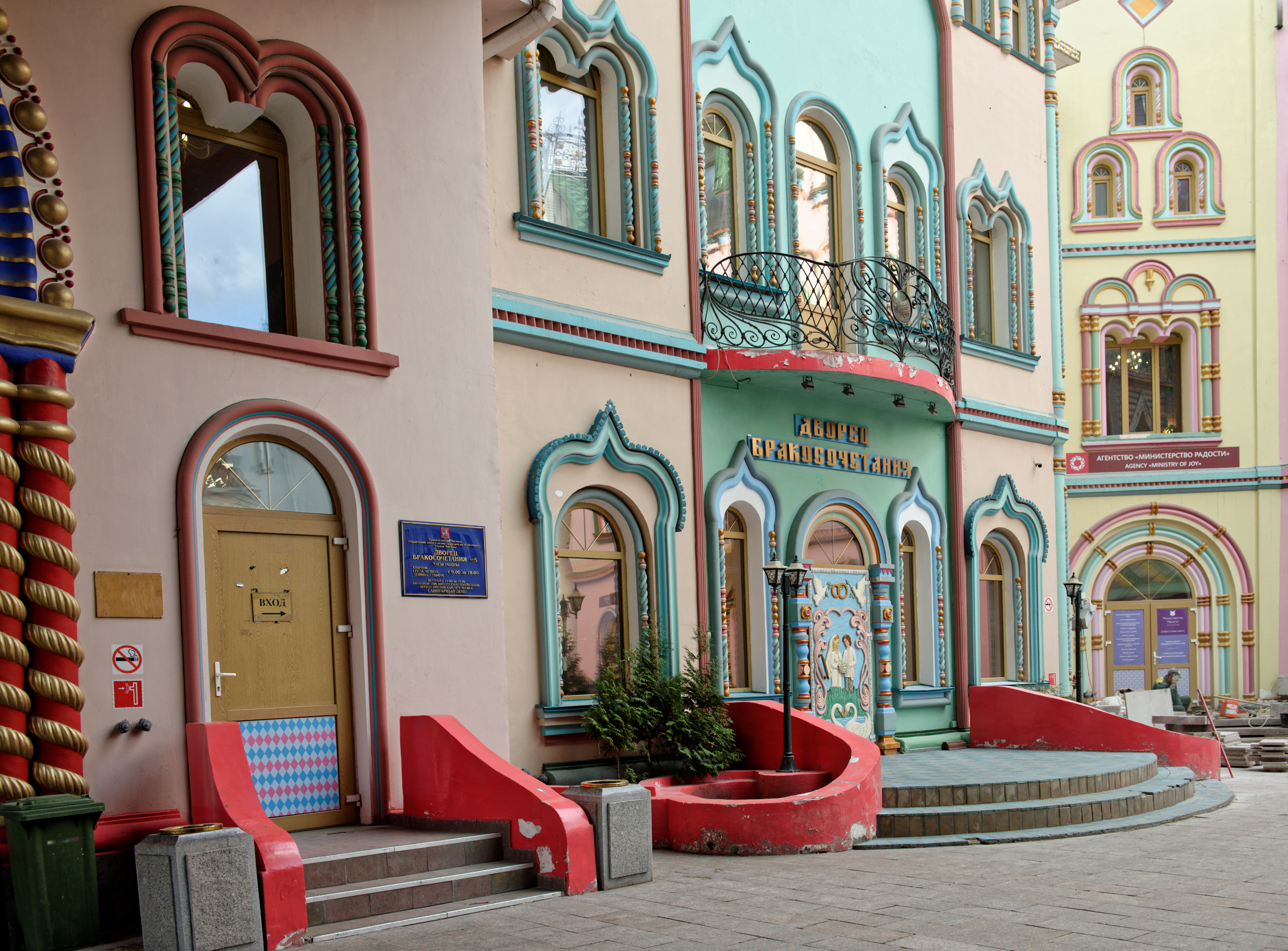
A building designed especially for weddings in Old Russian stone house architectural style in Izmailovo Kremlin

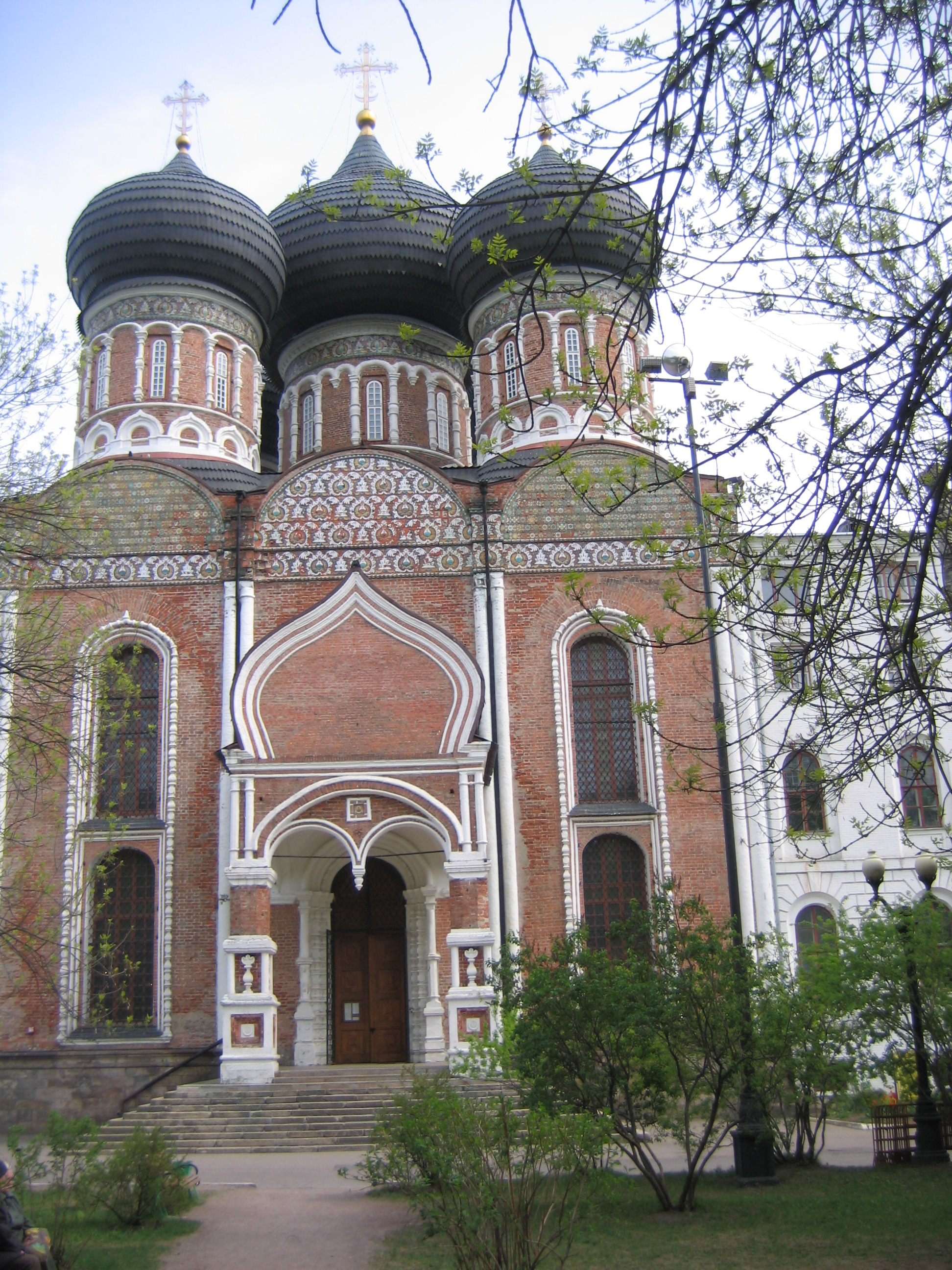
Church of Intercession of the Most Holy Theotokos

According to the Russian population audit of 1800, the population of Izmaylovo was 121 homesteads comprising 753 people. The village continued to grow slowly until the October Revolution, when the buildings were confiscated and given to laborers. In 1924, a part of Izmaylovo became known as Bauman township, named after the Russian revolutionary Nikolay Bauman. Other objects named after him are the Baumanskaya metro station and Bauman University, both are located outside of Izmaylovo.

== Geography ==
Izmaylovo borders Preobrazhenskoye and Sokolinaya gora Districts in the west, Perovo District in the south, Ivanovskoye District and MKAD in the east, and Golyanovo District in the north. Almost a half of its territory is occupied by Izmaylovsky Park, which, with an area of 12 square kilometers (4.6 sq mi), is one of the largest urban parks in the world and is about 3.5 times the size of the Central Park in New York City. Serebryanka River, which flows through the park, is the main river in the district.

== Izmaylovo Kremlin ==
The Kremlin in Izmaylovo is a unique center of culture and entertainment, based at the famous Izmaylovo Vernissage. It is built in an architecture style of Old Muscovite Russia which consists of colorful ornament and wooden architecture in the Russian style. It is an imitation of Moscow based on sketches from the 14th-17th centuries. It is supposed to depict many elements of Old Russian architecture as it looked like in pre-Petrine times. It is also inspired by drawings of Russian fairy tales. This complex is used for civil weddings as it has a wedding palace, a restaurant and bars. However, it is also used as an amusement park/open-air museum for children on the theme of 'Old Russia'. There is a reconstruction of a wooden Russian church that used to dot the Russian countryside before the Russian Revolution but it is not used for weddings. There is also a big market that sells souvenirs amongst other things.

== Izmaylovo Market ==
Next to the Kremlin there is a large open flea market where people sell various Russian crafts and souvenirs. Goods from Central Asia are offered too. Dishes from different regions of Russia are also sold as well as from other former countries of the Soviet Union. Izmaylovo became a market already in the 17th century.

== Izmailovo Hotel ==
Izmailovo Hotel was the largest hotel in Europe largest hotel in the world from 1980 until 1993. It consists of four high-rise buildings and has 5,000 rooms. It is located in Izmaylovo District near the Partizanskaya subway station of Moscow Metro.

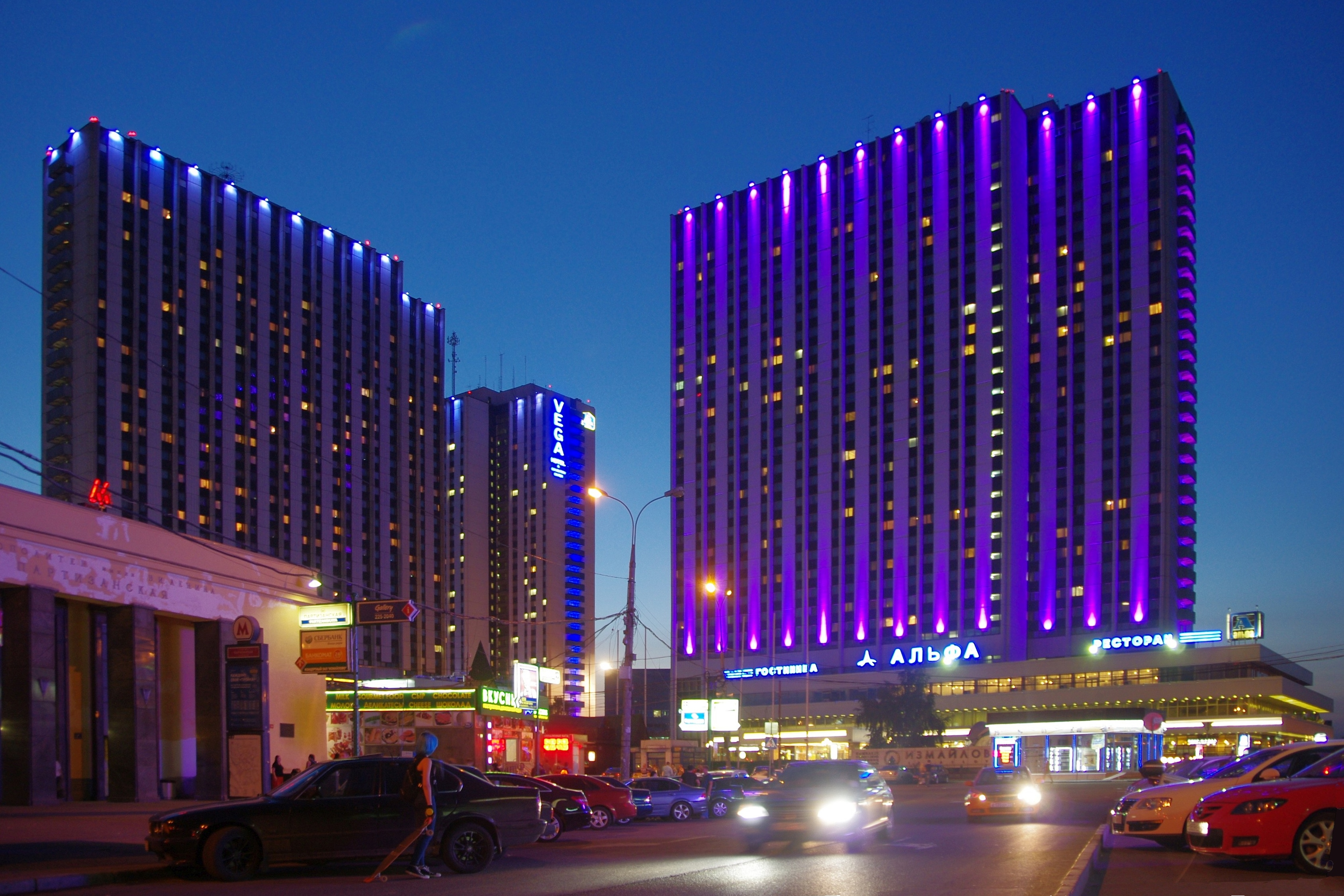
Izmailovo Hotel
