= Hautzig =

Hautzig is a German surname. Notable people with the surname include:

- Deborah Hautzig (born 1956), American author
- Esther Hautzig (1930–2009), American writer
- Walter Hautzig (1921–2017), pianist
