= Cheburikha =

Cheburikha Чебуриха
- Settlement
- Location within Altai Krai Location within Russia
- Coordinates: 51°30′N 81°45′E
- Country: Russia
- Region: Altai Krai
- District: Rubtsovsky District
- Time zone: UTC+7:00

Cheburikha (Russian: Чебуриха) is a rural locality (a settlement) in Dalny Selsoviet, Rubtsovsky District, Altai Krai, Russia. The population was 65 as of 2013. There are 2 streets.

== Geography ==
Cheburikha is located 50 km east of Rubtsovsk (the district's administrative centre) by road. Novovoznesenka is the nearest rural locality.
