= Novomatveyevka =

Novomatveyevka Новоматвеевка
- Settlement
- Location within Altai Krai Location within Russia
- Coordinates: 51°19′N 81°12′E
- Country: Russia
- Region: Altai Krai
- District: Rubtsovsky District
- Time zone: UTC+7:00

Novomatveyevka (Russian: Новоматвеевка) is a rural locality (a settlement) in Samarsky Selsoviet, Rubtsovsky District, Altai Krai, Russia. The population was 76 as of 2013. There is 1 street.

== Geography ==
Novomatveyevka is located 24 km south of Rubtsovsk (the district's administrative centre) by road. Samarka is the nearest rural locality.
