= Novosklyuikha =

Novosklyuikha Новосклюиха
- Selo
- Location within Altai Krai Location within Russia
- Coordinates: 51°32′N 81°24′E
- Country: Russia
- Region: Altai Krai
- District: Rubtsovsky District
- Time zone: UTC+7:00

Novosklyuikha (Russian: Новосклюиха) is a rural locality (a selo) and the administrative center of Novosklyuikhinsky Selsoviet, Rubtsovsky District, Altai Krai, Russia. The population was 670 as of 2013. There are 6 streets.

== Geography ==
Novosklyuikha is located 19 km east of Rubtsovsk (the district's administrative centre) by road.
