= Elektrozavodsky =

Elektrozavodsky (m), Elektrozavodskoye (n), Elektrozavodskaya (f) can mean the following:

- Elektrozavodskaya (Arbatsko-Pokrovskaya line)
- Elektrozavodskaya (Bolshaya Koltsevaya line)
- Elektrozavodskaya railway station
- Elektrozavodskaya Street (Moscow)
- Elektrozavodskaya (Kryvyi Rih Metro)
