= Tishinka =

Tishinka Тишинка
- Selo
- Location within Altai Krai Location within Russia
- Coordinates: 51°48′N 81°19′E
- Country: Russia
- Region: Altai Krai
- District: Rubtsovsky District
- Time zone: UTC+7:00

Tishinka (Russian: Тишинка) is a rural locality (a selo) and the administrative center of Tishinsky Selsoviet, Rubtsovsky District, Altai Krai, Russia. The population was 454 as of 2013. There are 6 streets.

== Geography ==
Tishinka is located 43 km north of Rubtsovsk (the district's administrative centre) by road. Novorossiysky is the nearest rural locality.
