= Vtorye Korosteli =

Vtorye Korosteli Вторые Коростели
- Selo
- Location within Altai Krai Location within Russia
- Coordinates: 51°24′N 80°37′E
- Country: Russia
- Region: Altai Krai
- District: Rubtsovsky District
- Time zone: UTC+7:00

Vtorye Korosteli (Russian: Вторые Коростели) is a rural locality (a selo) in Bolsheshelkovnikovsky Selsoviet, Rubtsovsky District, Altai Krai, Russia. The population was 228 as of 2013. There are 4 streets.

== Geography ==
Vtorye Korosteli is located 46 km southwest of Rubtsovsk (the district's administrative centre) by road. Bolshaya Shelkovka is the nearest rural locality.
