= Polovinkino =

Polovinkino Половинкино
- Village
- Interactive map of Polovinkino
- Coordinates: 51°25′N 81°14′E
- Country: Russia
- Region: Altai Krai
- District: Rubtsovsky District
- Time zone: UTC+7:00

Polovinkino (Russian: Половинкино) is a rural locality (a selo) and the administrative center of Polovinkinsky Selsoviet of Rubtsovsky District, Altai Krai, Russia. The population was 1,103 in 2016. There are 14 streets.

== Geography ==
Polovinkino is located 12 km south of Rubtsovsk (the district's administrative centre) by road. Rubtsovsk and Samarka are the nearest rural localities.
