= Zerno =

Zerno Зерно
- Settlement
- Location within Altai Krai Location within Russia
- Coordinates: 51°21′N 81°06′E
- Country: Russia
- Region: Altai Krai
- District: Rubtsovsky District
- Time zone: UTC+7:00

Zerno (Russian: Зерно) is a rural locality (a settlement) in Novoalexandrovsky Selsoviet, Rubtsovsky District, Altai Krai, Russia. The population was 196 as of 2013. There are 3 streets.

== Geography ==
Zerno is located 19 km south of Rubtsovsk (the district's administrative centre) by road. Novoaleksandrovka is the nearest rural locality.
