= Zelyonaya Dubrava, Rubtsovsky District, Altai Krai =

Zelyonaya Dubrava Зелёная Дубрава
- Settlement
- Location within Altai Krai Location within Russia
- Coordinates: 51°27′N 81°11′E
- Country: Russia
- Region: Altai Krai
- District: Rubtsovsky District
- Time zone: UTC+7:00

Zelyonaya Dubrava (Russian: Зелёная Дубрава) is a rural locality (a settlement) and the administrative center of Rubtsovsky Selsoviet, Rubtsovsky District, Altai Krai, Russia. The population was 1,009 as of 2013. There are 11 streets.

== Geography ==
Zelyonaya Dubrava is located 7 km south of Rubtsovsk (the district's administrative centre) by road. Michurinsky is the nearest rural locality.
