= Traktorny =

Traktorny Тракторный
- Passing loop
- Location within Altai Krai Location within Russia
- Coordinates: 51°34′N 81°14′E
- Country: Russia
- Region: Altai Krai
- District: Rubtsovsky District
- Time zone: UTC+7:00

Traktorny (Russian: Тракторный) is a rural locality (a passing loop) in Bezrukavsky Selsoviet, Rubtsovsky District, Altai Krai, Russia. The population was 86 as of 2013. There is 1 street.

== Geography ==
Traktorny is located 11 km north of Rubtsovsk (the district's administrative centre) by road. Bezrukavka and Opytny are the nearest rural localities.
