= Vympel, Altai Krai =

Vympel Вымпел
- Settlement
- Location within Altai Krai Location within Russia
- Coordinates: 51°30′N 81°16′E
- Country: Russia
- Region: Altai Krai
- District: Rubtsovsky District
- Time zone: UTC+7:00

Vympel (Russian: Вымпел) is a rural locality (a settlement) in Bezrukavsky Selsoviet, Rubtsovsky District, Altai Krai, Russia. The population was 162 as of 2013. There are 6 streets.

== Geography ==
Vympel is located 7 km east of Rubtsovsk (the district's administrative centre) by road. Kalinovka is the nearest rural locality.
