= Saratovka, Russia =

Saratovka Саратовка
- Village
- Location within Altai Krai Location within Russia
- Coordinates: 51°22′N 81°38′E
- Country: Russia
- Region: Altai Krai
- District: Rubtsovsky District
- Time zone: UTC+7:00

Saratovka (Russian: Саратовка) is a rural locality (a selo) and the administrative center of Saratovsky Selsoviet of Rubtsovsky District, Altai Krai, Russia, was founded in 1906. The population was 530 as of 2016. There are four streets.

Saratovka (German: Saratowka) was founded in 1906 by Lutheran colonists from the Volga Region.

== Geography ==
Saratovka is located 38 km southeast of Rubtsovsk (the district's administrative centre) by road. Nazarovka is the nearest rural locality.

== Ethnicity ==
The village is inhabited by Russians, Germans and others. The village was founded by Lutheran colonists from the Volga region.
