= Rubtsovsky =

Rubtsovsky may refer to:

- Rubtsovsky District, Russia
- Rubtsovskaya (Moscow Metro)
