= Bezrukavka =

Bezrukavka Безрукавка
- Selo
- Location within Altai Krai Location within Russia
- Coordinates: 51°35′N 81°16′E
- Country: Russia
- Region: Altai Krai
- District: Rubtsovsky District
- Time zone: UTC+7:00

Bezrukavka (Russian: Безрукавка) is a rural locality (a selo) and the administrative center of Bezrukavsky Selsoviet, Rubtsovsky District, Altai Krai, Russia. The population was 1,778 as of 2013. There are 19 streets.

== Geography ==
Bezrukavka is located 12 km northeast of Rubtsovsk (the district's administrative centre) by road. Beryozovka is the nearest rural locality.
