= Chayka, Altai Krai =

Chayka Чайка
- Settlement
- Location within Altai Krai Location within Russia
- Coordinates: 51°27′N 81°12′E
- Country: Russia
- Region: Altai Krai
- District: Rubtsovsky District
- Time zone: UTC+7:00

Chayka (Russian: Чайка) is a rural locality (a settlement) in Rubtsovsky Selsoviet, Rubtsovsky District, Altai Krai, Russia. The population was 17 in 2013. There is one street.

== Geography ==
Chayka is located 6 km south of Rubtsovsk (the district's administrative centre) by road. Rubtsovsk is the nearest rural locality.
