= Posyolok imeni Kalinina =

Posyolok imeni Kalinina Посёлок имени Калинина
- Settlement
- Location within Altai Krai Location within Russia
- Coordinates: 51°38′N 81°26′E
- Country: Russia
- Region: Altai Krai
- District: Rubtsovsky District
- Time zone: UTC+7:00

Posyolok imeni Kalinina (Russian: Посёлок имени Калинина) is a rural locality (a settlement) in Bobkovsky Selsoviet, Rubtsovsky District, Altai Krai, Russia. The population was 142 as of 2013. There are 5 streets.

== Geography ==
The settlement is located 34 km northeast of Rubtsovsk (the district's administrative centre) by road. Katkovo is the nearest rural locality.
