= Bolshaya Shelkovka =

Bolshaya Shelkovka Большая Шелковка
- Selo
- Location within Altai Krai Location within Russia
- Coordinates: 51°25′N 80°38′E
- Country: Russia
- Region: Altai Krai
- District: Rubtsovsky District
- Time zone: UTC+7:00

Bolshaya Shelkovka (Russian: Большая Шелковка) is a rural locality (a selo) and the administrative center of Bolsheshelkovnikovsky Selsoviet, Rubtsovsky District, Altai Krai, Russia. The population was 384 as of 2013. There are 3 streets.

== Geography ==
Bolshaya Shelkovka is located 44 km southwest of Rubtsovsk (the district's administrative centre) by road. Vtorye Korosteli is the nearest rural locality.
