= Nazarovka, Rubtsovsky District, Altai Krai =

Nazarovka Назаровка
- Settlement
- Location within Altai Krai Location within Russia
- Coordinates: 51°25′N 81°40′E
- Country: Russia
- Region: Altai Krai
- District: Rubtsovsky District
- Time zone: UTC+7:00

Nazarovka (Russian: Назаровка) is a rural locality (a settlement) in Dalny Selsoviet, Rubtsovsky District, Altai Krai, Russia. The population was 150 as of 2013. There are 2 streets.

== Geography ==
Nazarovka is located 36 km east of Rubtsovsk (the district's administrative centre) by road. Saratovka is the nearest rural locality.
