= Yury Kataev =

Russian painter

- Born: Yury Konstantinovich Kataev; 6 January 1932; Rubtsovsk, West Siberian Krai, Soviet Union
- Died: 5 July 2011 (aged 79); Novosibirsk
- Education: Saint Petersburg Art and Industry Academy
- Known for: Painting
- Movement: Realism, Impressionism, Monumental sculpture, Mosaic

Yuri K. Kataev (Russian: Юрий Константинович Катаев) (January 6, 1932 – July 5, 2011) was a Soviet muralist, painter and sculptor, a member of the Union of Russian Artists.

== Biography ==
Kataev was born on January 6, 1932, in Rubtsovsk, West Siberian Region (now Altai Territory).

Kataev was known for his work as a muralist, sculptor, ceramist, designer, and painter. He was a member of the Union of Artists. He is notable in the history of Siberian art primarily as a muralist. He created numerous works in Novosibirsk and the surrounding region, including the relief mural "Novosibirsk" at the Garin-Mikhailovsky metro station (1986), comprehensive interior design for the Novosibirsk Youth Theater (1983), and several architectural decorations, such as the station at Postyshevo (BAM) featuring a bust of P. P. Postyshev and a heraldic composition with a clock on the facade (1982).

Kataev also worked on the design of the suburban banks' pavilion at Novosibirsk-Main station (1980), the architectural decoration of the pioneer camp "Sibtekstilmash" plant (1974), and the interior decoration of the station at Altai (1974). His projects included the interiors of the Tu-144 aircraft, the railway station in Pavlodar, the DC "Manpower Reserves," and a concert hall in Novosibirsk. Since 1963, he participated in provincial, regional, national, and international exhibitions.

Kataev received his education from the Almaty Art School, graduating with honors in the 1950s, and later from the Leningrad Higher Industrial Art School. In 1961, he moved to Novosibirsk at the invitation of the Union of Artists of Novosibirsk, where he spent his entire creative life. A pupil of the Russian classical school of realism, he incorporated its best traditions into his work.

For many years, Kataev was elected to the governing bodies of the Novosibirsk Union of Artists, the board of the Union of Artists, and the exhibition committee.

== Achievements ==
Kataev received several awards and honors:

- Diploma of Honour from the Executive Committee of the Novosibirsk City Council of People's Deputies for participation in the I Zonal Exhibition "Siberia Socialist" (1964)
- Certificate of Merit from the Novosibirsk branch of the Art Fund of the RSFSR
- Letter of the Secretariat of the Board of the Union of Artists of the USSR (1967)
- Certificate of Merit from the Secretariat of the Board of the RSFSR Union of Artists (1967)
- Badge of the Ministry of Culture of the RSFSR "For active participation in the cultural service of the builders of BAM"
- Diploma of 1st degree from the RSFSR Union of Architects (1984)
- Diploma of the Siberian Second Contest in the field of urban planning, architecture, and design "Golden Capital" (1997)
- First place in the competition for the best project of the monument to architect A. D. Kryachkov
- Winner of the Governor of the Novosibirsk Region's award in the field of literature and art (2003)

The Novosibirsk Art Museum holds a permanent exhibition of Kataev's works, including "Workaholic-Ob," "Ob Gave," "Stoker Rechflot," "Buoy Keeper on the Ob," "A Irtysh," "Berth," and "Village Marina," as well as a sculptural portrait of the artist Chernobrovtseva and an outdoor decorative vase "Rooster" (ceramics, chamotte).
