= Rubtsovsk Airport =

- IATA: none; ICAO: UNBR

Summary
- Airport type: Public
- Location: Rubtsovsk
- Elevation AMSL: 709 ft / 216 m
- Coordinates: 51°35′0″N 81°12′0″E
- Interactive map of Rubtsovsk Airport

Runways
| Direction | Length | | Surface |
| Direction | ft | m | Surface |
|---|---|---|---|
| 03/21 | 5,249 | 1,600 | Asphalt |

Rubtsovsk Airport (Russian: Аэропорт Рубцовск) (ICAO: UNBR) is an airport in Russia located 6 km north of Rubtsovsk.

The airport was purchased in the late nineties by a private individual primarily for the purpose of obtaining access to fuel stores at the airport for resale. The airport is currently inoperable and is used mainly by youth for drag racing.

The 1,600m (5249 ft) singular runway that was operative could only land smaller turboprops and regional jets due to its shorter than average length.

== See also ==
- List of airports in Russia
