= Elektrozavodskaya (Arbatsko-Pokrovskaya line) =

Moscow Metro station

Elektrozavodskaya Электрозаводская
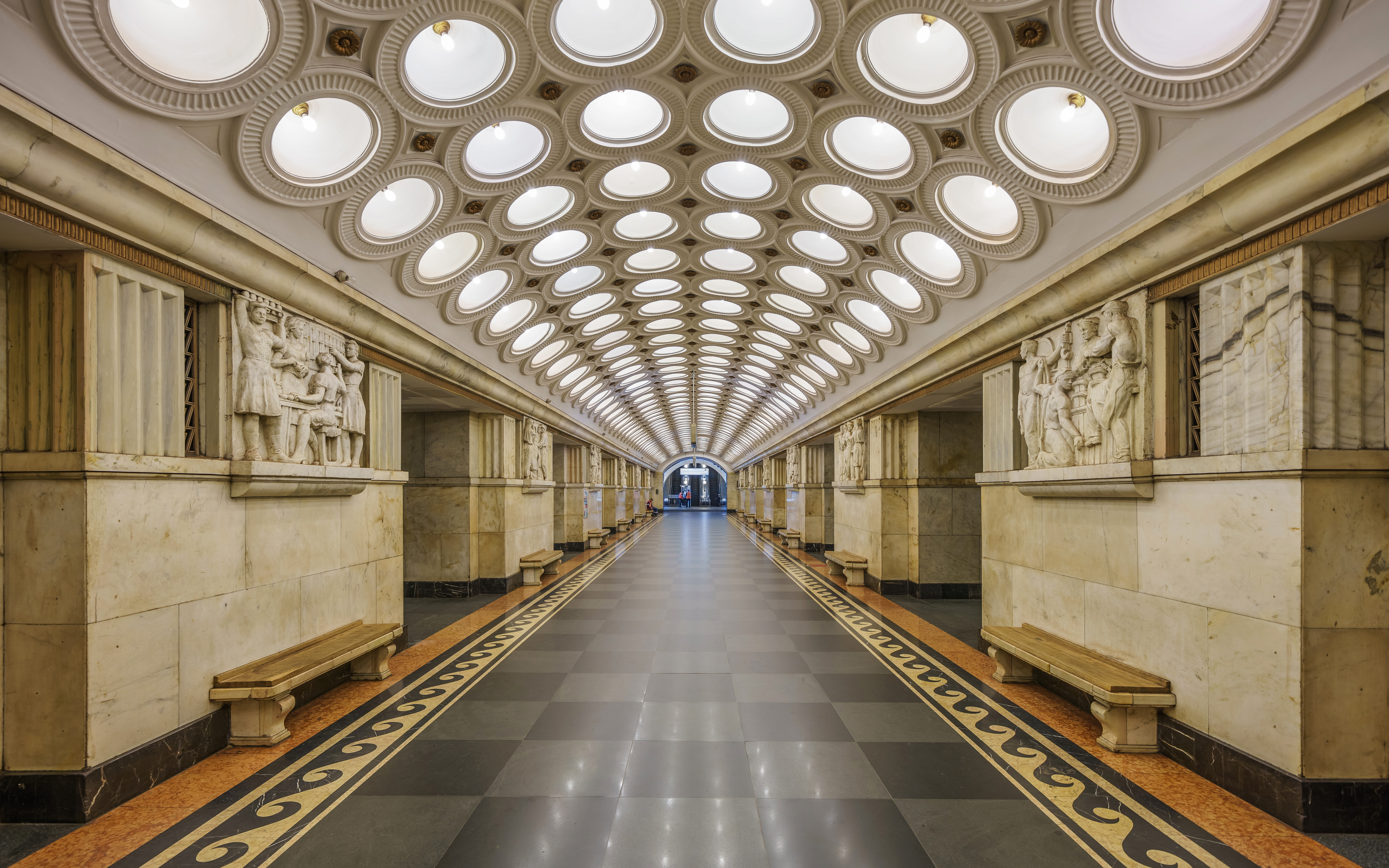

General information
- Location: Sokolinaya Gora District; Eastern Administrative Okrug; Moscow; Russia
- Coordinates: 55.7817°N 37.7037°E
- System: Moscow Metro station
- Owner: Moskovsky Metropoliten
- Line: Arbatsko-Pokrovskaya line
- Platforms: 1
- Tracks: 2

Construction
- Depth: 31.5 metres (103 ft)
- Platform levels: 1
- Parking: No

Other information
- Station code: 048
- Website: https://elektrozavodskaya.net/

History
- Opened: 15 May 1944; 82 years ago

Passengers
- 2002: 16,516,250

Services
Preceding station	Moscow Metro	Following station
Baumanskaya towards Pyatnitskoye Shosse	Arbatsko-Pokrovskaya line	Semyonovskaya towards Shchyolkovskaya
Sokolniki anticlockwise / outer	Bolshaya Koltsevaya line transfer at Elektrozavodskaya	Lefortovo clockwise / inner
Route map
Location
- Location within Moscow Metro

Elektrozavodskaya (Russian: Электрозаво́дская) is a Moscow Metro station on the Arbatsko-Pokrovskaya Line in the Russian capital Moscow. It is one of the better-known stations of the system. Built as part of the third stage of the Moscow Metro and opened on 15 May 1944 during World War II, the station is one of the iconic symbols of the system, famous for its architectural decoration which is work of architects Vladimir Shchuko (who died whilst working on the station's project in 1939) and Vladimir Gelfreich, along with participation of his student Igor Rozhin.

The station serves the Basmanny district and is located on the Bolshaya Semyonovskaya Street, next to the Yauza River. The railway station Elektrazavodskaya of the Kazan direction is also located nearby. In May 2007, the station was closed for a year during which the escalators were completely replaced, along with the floor panels. Most of the details and finishes including Motovilov's bas-reliefs were refurbished. The station was reopened on 28 November 2008. On 30 December 2024, the station opened a transfer to go to the Bolshaya Koltsevaya line named Elektrozavodskaya.

== Station Design ==
Named after the electric light bulb factory nearby, the preliminary layout included Schuko's idea of making the ceiling covered with six rows of circular incandescent inset lamps (of which there were 318 in total). However, the outbreak of World War II halted all works until 1943 when construction resumed. Gelfreich and Rozhin finished the design by adding an addition theme to the station the struggle of the home front during the war, which is highlighted by the 12 marble bas-reliefs on the pylons done by Georgiy Motovilov. The rest of the station's interior features most of the 1930s plans including powder-ballada marble on the rectangular pylons (the outside faces have sconces and decorative gilded grilles depicting the hammer and sickle), red salietti marble on the station walls, a dark olive duvalu marble on the socle and a chessboard layout on the main platform floor of granite and labradorite.

The station's hexagonal shaped vestibule, features a domed structure on a low drum, on the corner niches of which are six medallions with bas-reliefs of main pioneers in electricity and electrical engineering: William Gilbert, Benjamin Franklin, Mikhail Lomonosov, Michael Faraday, Pavel Yablochkov, and Alexander Popov along with their pioneering apparatus. The interior of the vestibule is further punctuated by the same bright red salietti marble. Outside the vestibule in the archway there is a sculpture to the metro-builders by Matvey Manizer.

The station's legacy was that it serves as a bridge between the pre-war Art Deco-influenced Stalinist architecture as seen on the second stage stations and their post-war counterparts on the Koltsevaya Line. Both Gelfreich and Rozhin were awarded the Stalin Prize in 1946 for their work.

== Gallery ==
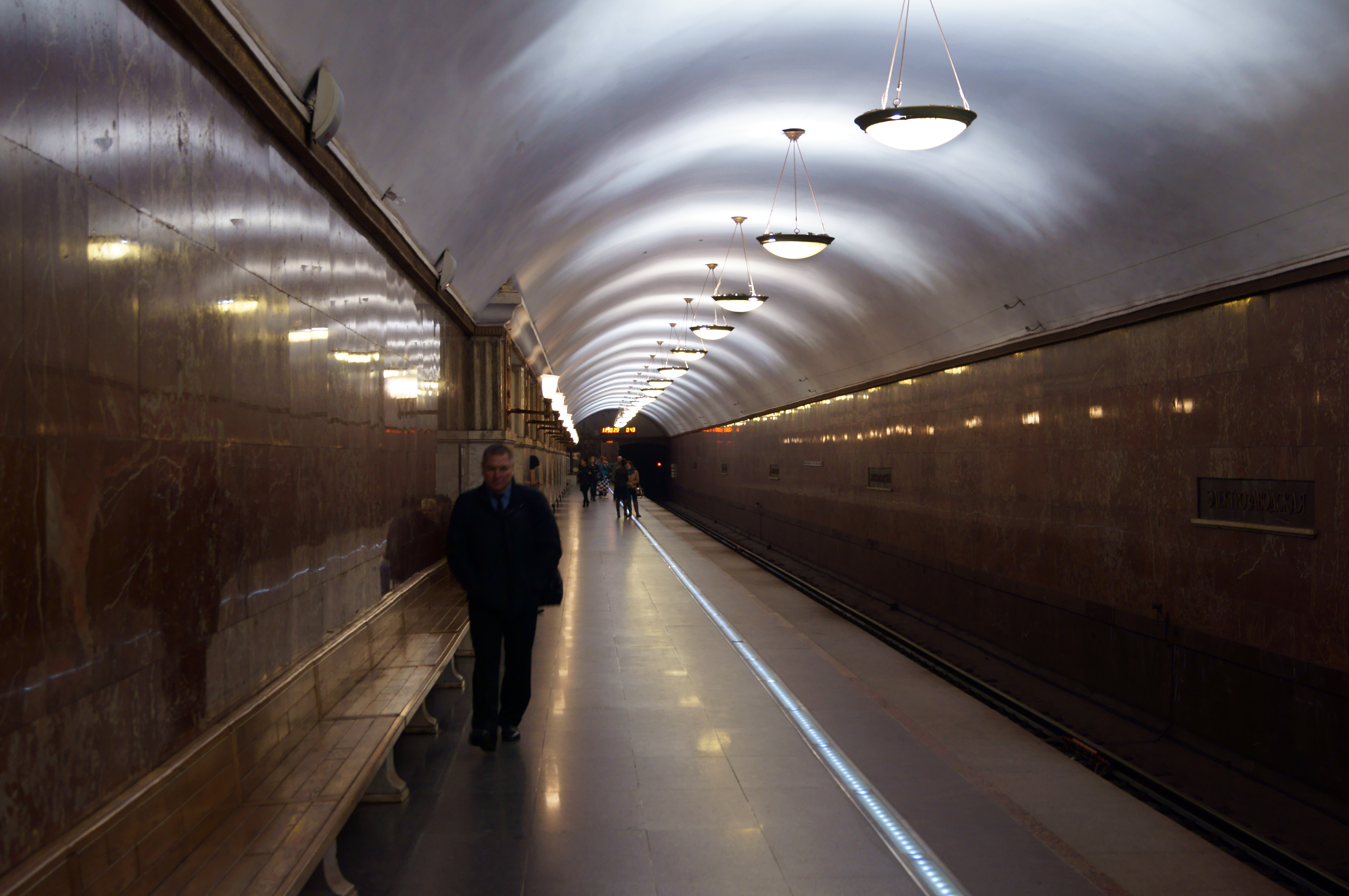
Station platform

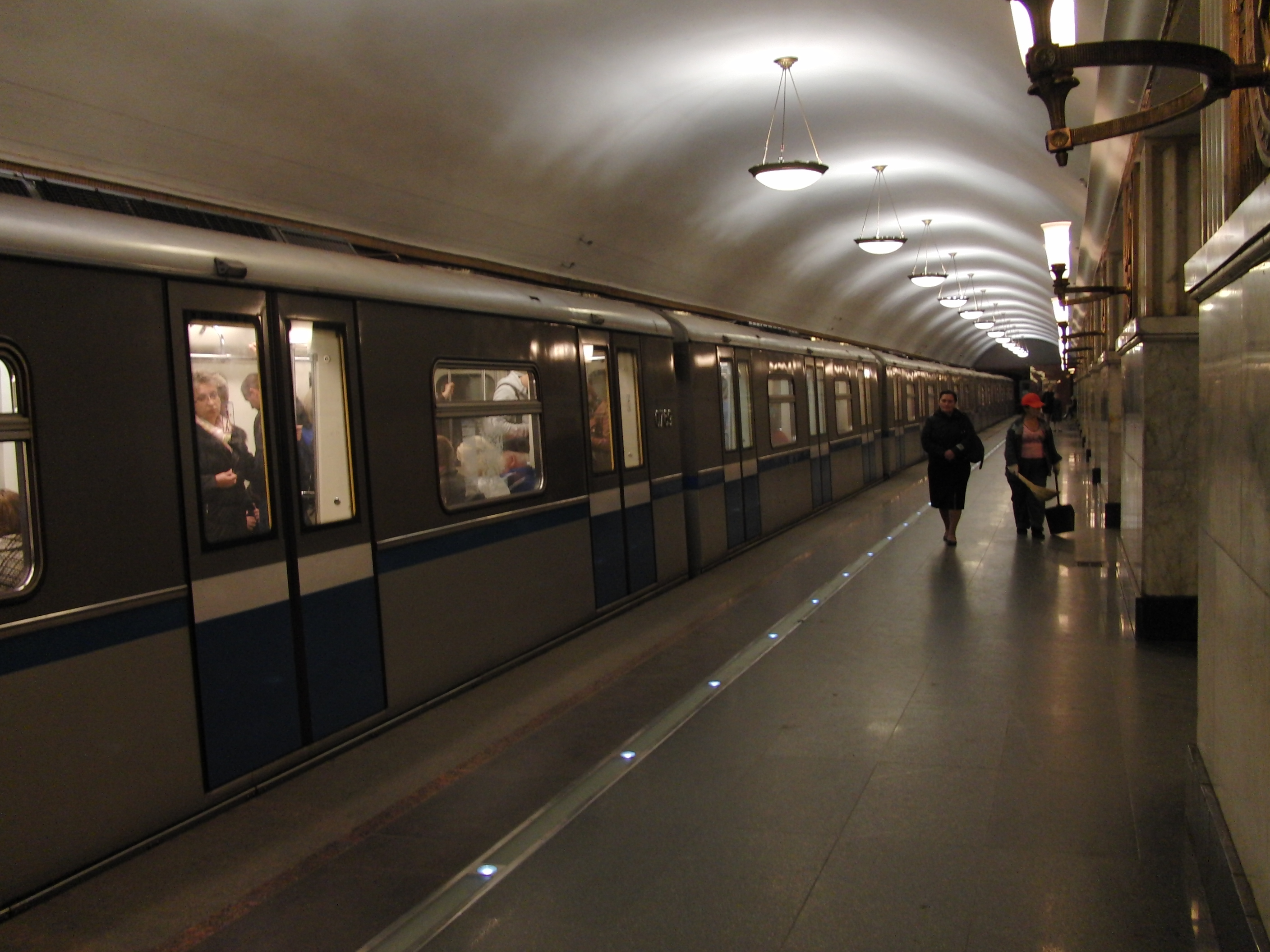
Station platform with a Rusich train (81-740/741)

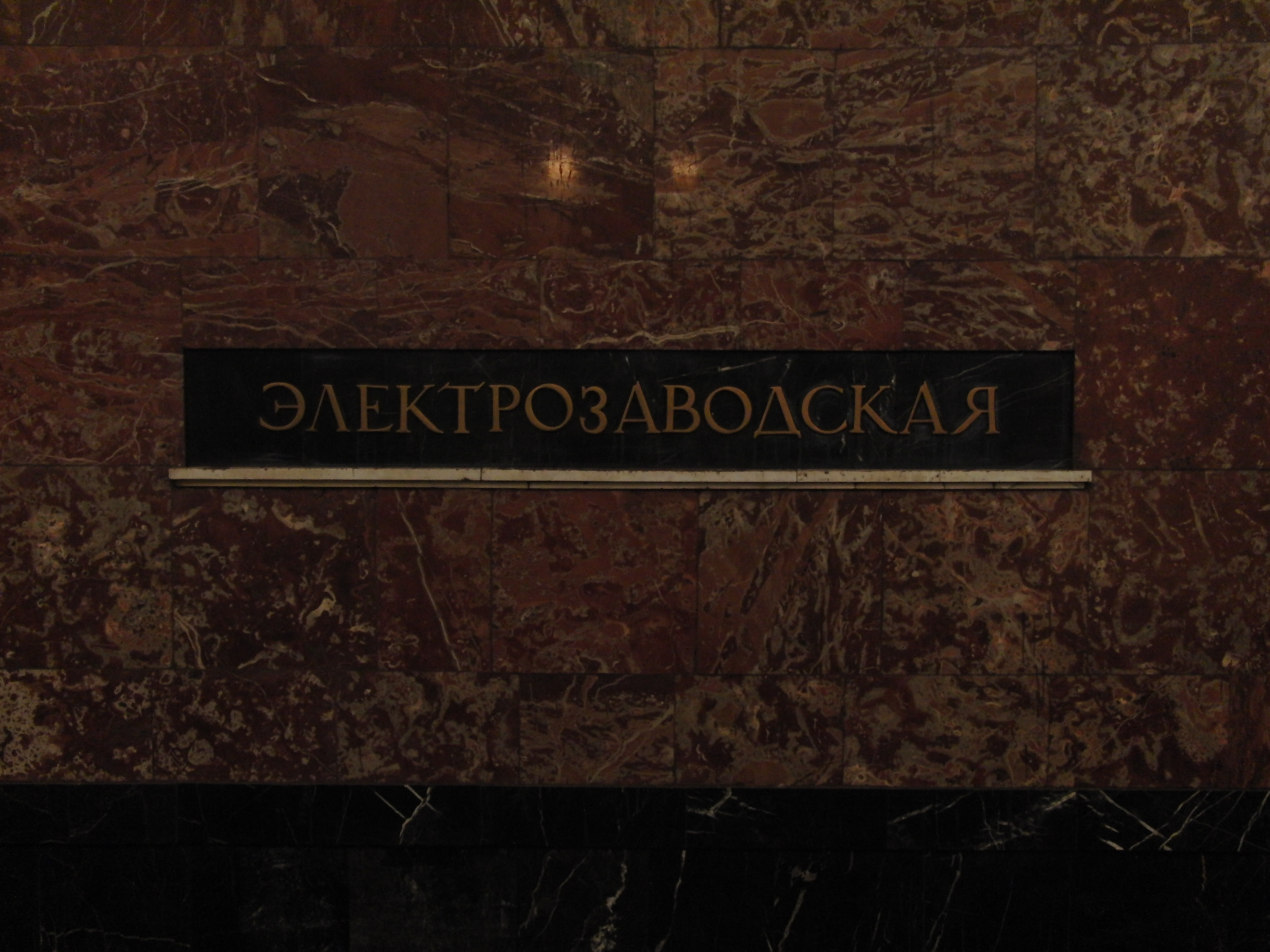
Wall artwork on the platform

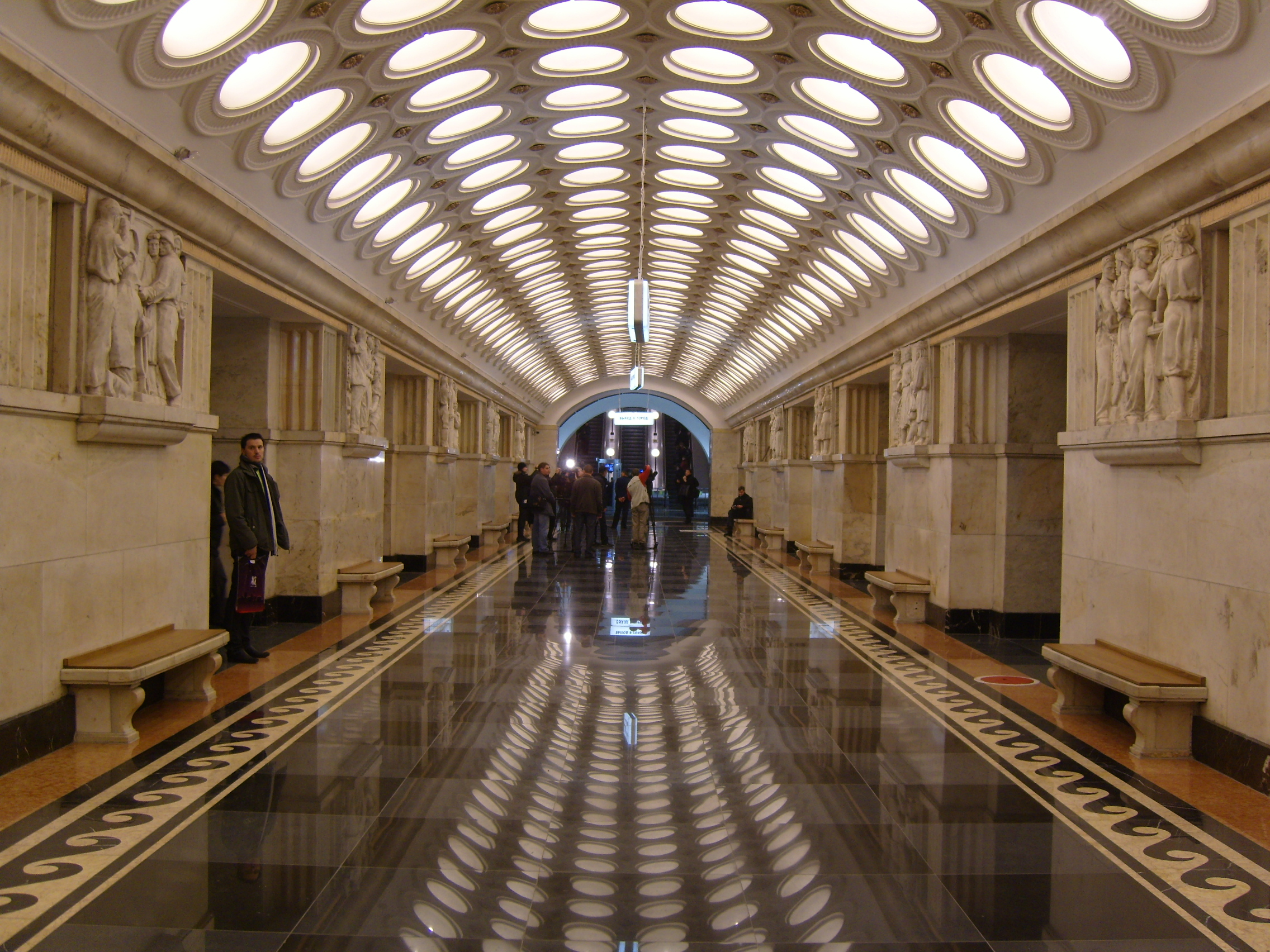
Central hall just after the 2007/2008 renovation

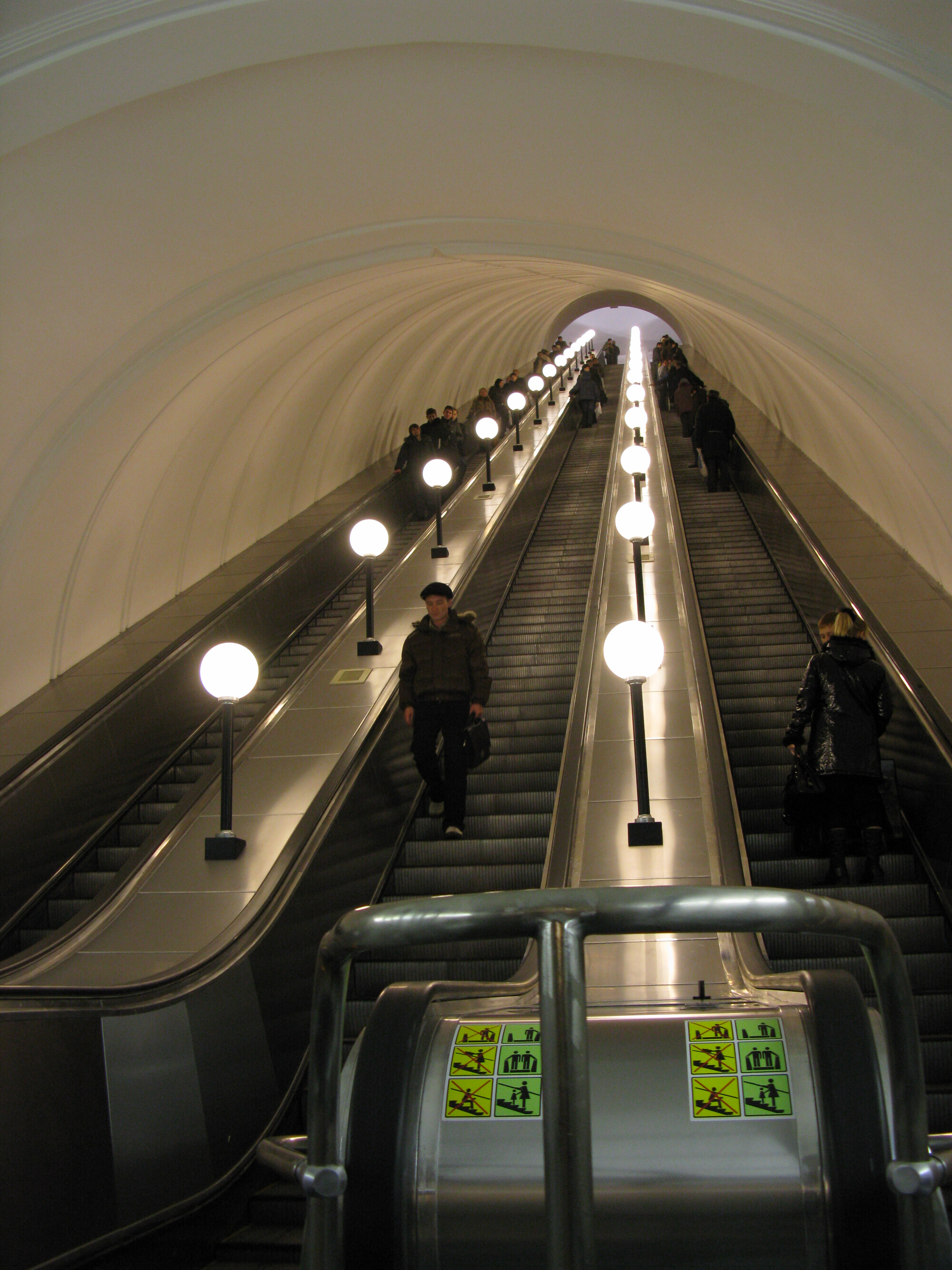
Escalators

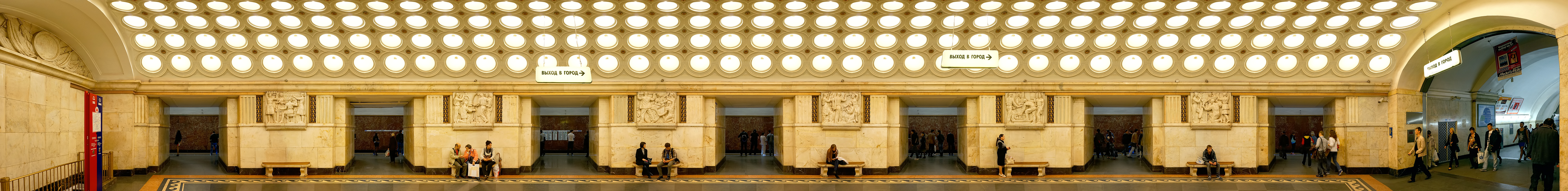
This station has 7 accesses from the central hall to platform

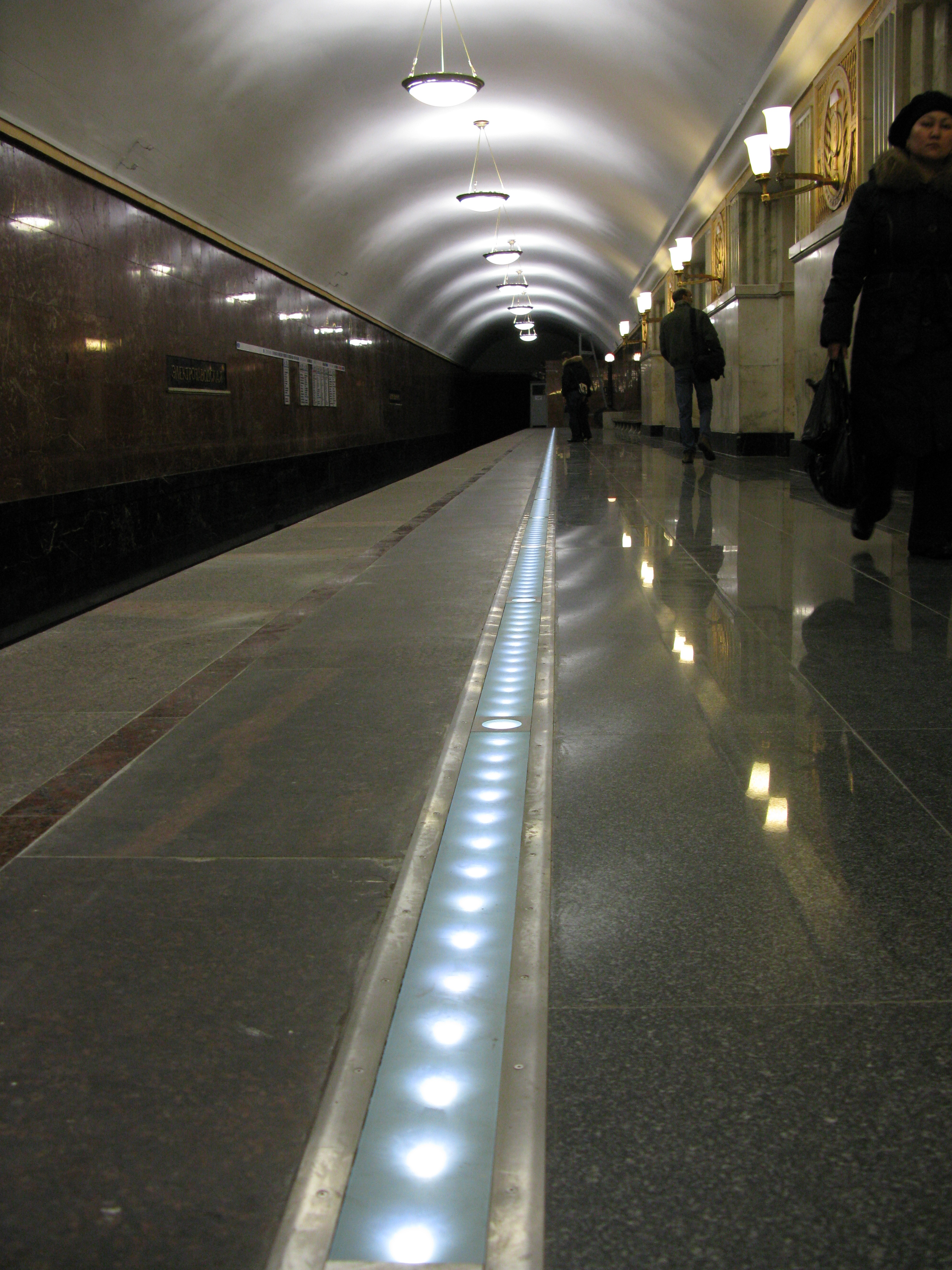
After reconstruction

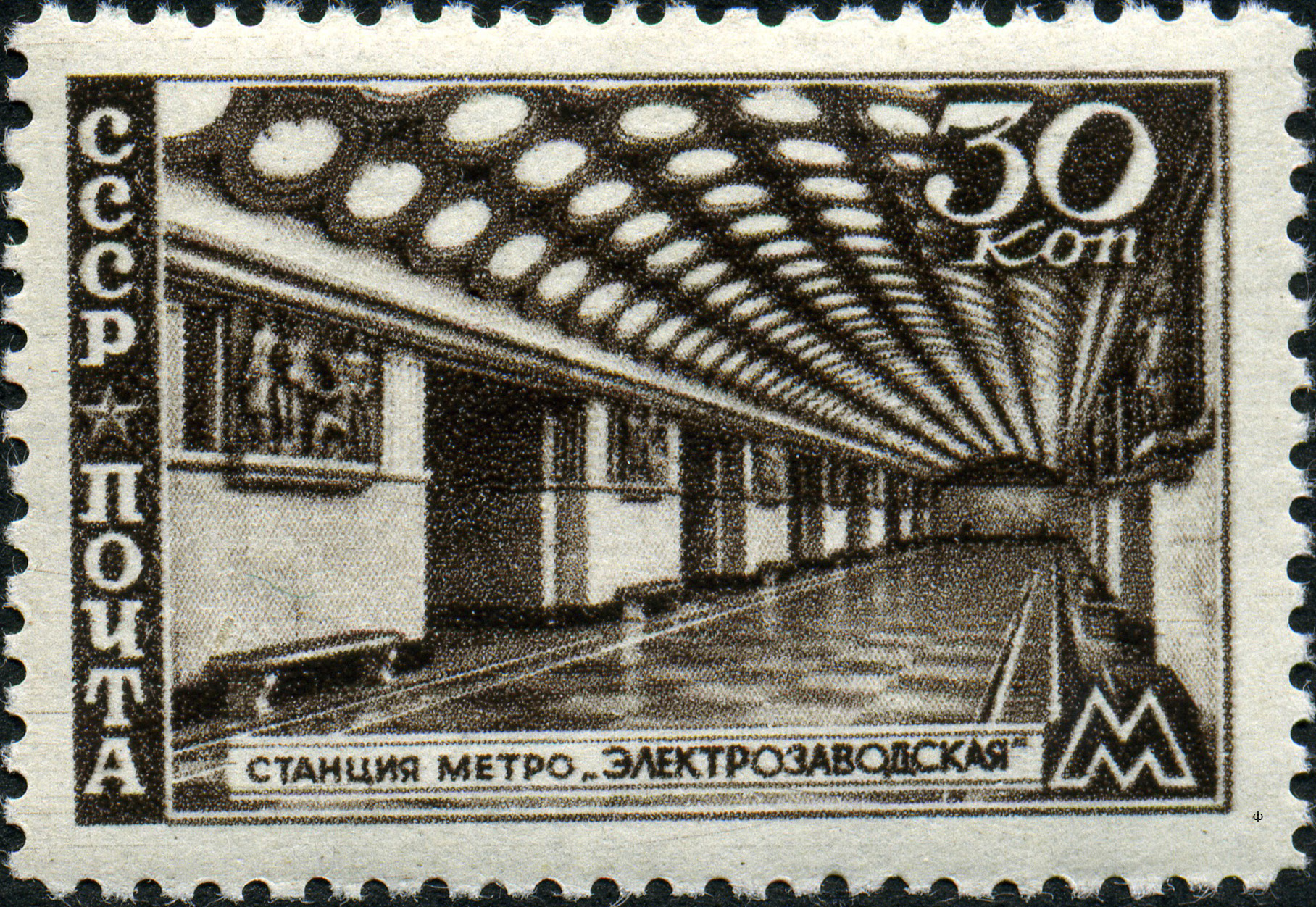
Stamp of the soviet union in 1947

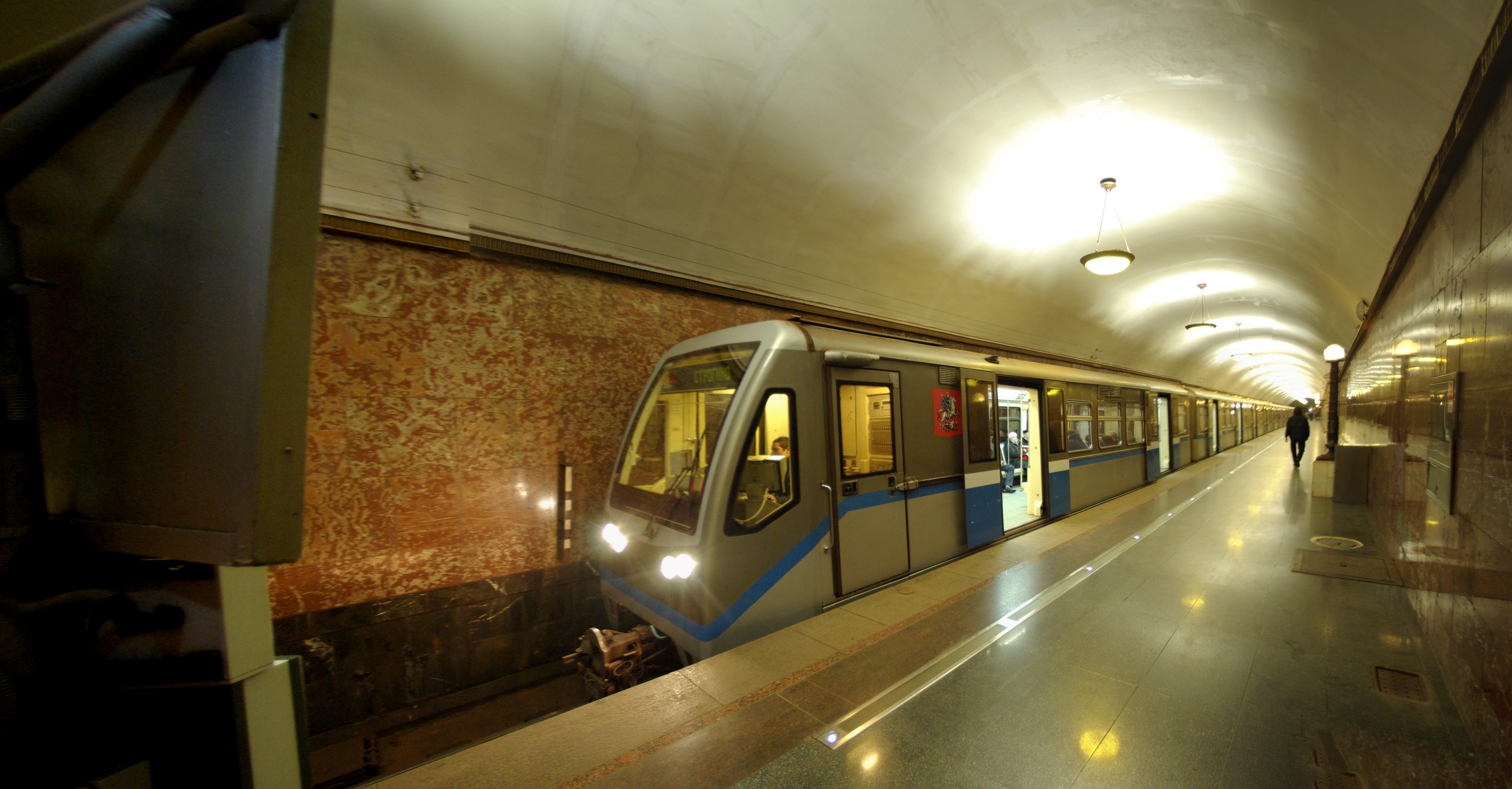
Station platform with a Rusich train (81-740/741)
