= Yevgeni Kryukov =

Russian footballer and coach (1963–2024)

Personal information
- Full name: Yevgeni Vladimirovich Kryukov
- Date of birth: 3 August 1963
- Place of birth: Rubtsovsk, Altai Krai, Russian SFSR, USSR
- Date of death: 2 December 2024 (aged 61)
- Place of death: Sochi, Krasnodar Krai, Russia
- Height: 1.84 m (6 ft 0 in)
- Position: Goalkeeper

Senior career*
Years	Team	Apps	(Gls)
1981–1982	FC Torpedo Rubtsovsk	42	(0)
1983–1987	FC Kuzbass Kemerovo	134	(0)
1988	FC Torpedo Moscow	0	(0)
1988–1990	FC Kuzbass Kemerovo	113	(0)
1991–1993	FC Rostselmash Rostov-on-Don	100	(0)
1994–1998	FC Zhemchuzhina Sochi	137	(0)
1999	FC Kristall Smolensk	7	(0)

Managerial career
- 2000–2005: FC Zhemchuzhina Sochi (youth teams)
- 2006–2007: FC Rostov (reserves assistant)
- 2008: FC Adler
- 2009–2010: FC Zhemchuzhina Sochi (youth teams)
- 2016–2017: FC Sochi (GK coach)
- * Club domestic league appearances and goals

Yevgeni Vladimirovich Kryukov (Russian: Евгений Владимирович Крюков; 3 August 1963 – 2 December 2024) was a Russian professional football coach and a player. He died in Sochi on 2 December 2024, at the age of 61.

== Career ==
Kryukov made his professional debut in the Soviet Second League in 1981 for FC Torpedo Rubtsovsk.
