= Deborah Hautzig =

American author

Deborah Hautzig (born 1956 in New York) is an American author of several children's books, including the Little Witch series along with young adult targeted books.

== Biography ==
=== Family and education ===
She is the daughter of Walter Hautzig and Esther Hautzig, who wrote the book The Endless Steppe. She graduated from the Chapin School in New York. She published her first novel while still a student at Sarah Lawrence College.

=== Working on literature ===
In addition to the Little Witch series, Deborah has written over 35 Sesame Street books. She has written modern-day versions of children's classics such as The Secret Garden, The Little Mermaid, and The Nutcracker.

She has also written two young adult targeted books, Hey Dollface! and Second Star to the Right, which was loosely based on her own battle with anorexia, a battle she did not win until after finishing writing it.
