= The Endless Steppe =

1968 memoir by Esther Hautzig

- Author: Esther Hautzig
- Cover artist: Caroline Binch
- Language: English
- Genre: Autobiography
- Publisher: Harper Collins
- Publication date: 1968
- Publication place: United States
- Media type: Print Hardcover, Hardback & Paperback

The Endless Steppe (1968) is a memoir of survival by Esther Hautzig, describing her exile with her immediate family to Siberia during World War II. Kirkus Reviews granted it a Kirkus Star, which "marks books of exceptional merit".

== Summary ==
The Endless Steppe is about Esther Hautzig's childhood. When Esther is 10 years old, she and her family, along with other Jews, are taken from their home in Vilnius (that time known as Wilno), Poland by the Russians. She and her family are sent on a long train ride to Siberia, are separated from one another, and are forced to work in horrible conditions in a gypsum mine. After some time her family is allowed to live in a hut in the nearby town of Rubtsovsk, but they do not have much money and need to find creative ways to make a small income. They also have trouble with the Russian language and the fact that Esther's father is conscripted to the front lines of the Russian army. After several years and the war's conclusion, Esther's father returns, and the exiled Jews are returned to Poland. Esther and her family come home to Vilnius, where they find that none of the people they knew before remain; all died in the Holocaust. They encounter unwelcome responses from the new inhabitants; this illustrates post-war anti-semitism in Poland. They also discover the irony that their exile to Siberia kept them safe from the Holocaust.

== Plot ==
In 1941, young Esther Rudomin (as she was then called) lives a charmed existence in the pretty town of Vilnius (Wilno) in northeast Poland (now the capital of Lithuania). She is a somewhat spoiled only child living with her large extended family in a manor house owned by her grandparents, and her parents are wealthy and well-respected members of the Jewish community, largely due to her father's skilled trade as an electrical engineer. Despite the Nazi invasion and the Soviet occupation of their region, to 10-year-old Esther, the war is something that ends at her garden gate. One June day, Soviet soldiers arrive at their house declaring the Rudomins to be "capitalists and enemies of the people." Their house and valuables are seized, and Esther, her parents, and her paternal grandparents are packed into cattle cars and exiled to another part of the Soviet Union, which turns out to be a forced labour camp in Siberia. Three events happen during the move that would be revisited later: Esther is ordered by her mother to take her jewelry to the nearby home of her own mother, where Esther receives the darkest vision of her life; to never see her maternal grandmother again. When given a very brief amount of time to pack for the trip. Esther attempts to include a family photo album in her luggage, only to be overruled by her mother, who warns her they need to salvage as much as their wardrobe as they can for Siberia. During the arrest, Esther's uncle, who had planned a casual visit with her mother, runs out the door. The soldiers demand he be identified, but Esther's mother lies about him being a stranger to prevent association with the Rudomins and his likely arrest as well.

This first half of the book, Esther recalls the horrors of this world: the customary division of the healthy and weak, so that Esther, her parents, and her grandmother are separated from her grandfather; the nightmarish two month train journey with nothing more than watery soup (and an occasional meal of bread and cheese from one of the shops at the train stations they sometimes stop to refuel); the disorienting arrival in the camp; and the backbreaking work in a gypsum mine that they are forced to do. She also describes the unexpected mercies that exist alongside it: the local children who smuggle food to the slave labourers at considerable danger to themselves; the amnesty, requested by Britain, that allows the Poles to be released from the camp and to move to Rubtsovsk, a nearby village; and the kindness of the villagers, people with almost as little as the Rudomins, who enable them to survive their exile.

== Themes ==
The Rudomins go from privileged complacency, in which they rely on servants to do everything for them, to a world where the growth of a potato plant can mean the difference between life and death. Esther is also forced to rely on making clothes for the few rich people of the village—the sort of people they had been in Poland—for the price of a bit of bread and milk. She almost absorbs the harsh Soviet message of their exile, feeling a perverse pride that "the little rich girl of Vilnius survived poverty as well as anyone else." She also recalls the baracholka (flea market) in Siberia, a weekly swap meet where the people engage in vibrant trade.

Besides the hardships of Siberia, other horrid news comes, first that Esther's paternal grandfather was transported to a logging camp in another part of the country where he soon fell ill. His problems are overlooked, not losing sight of the "big picture", as "there were trees that needed to be cut down", and he soon died from pneumonia and bronchitis. Much later in the story, she learns that all her matrilineal family members perished in the Holocaust. Her patrilineal family members were also sent to the concentration camps, although a scant number survived. Her father, who flees Rubtsovsk and eventually finds his way back to Vilnius, writes that he visited their former house one last time (now in possession of an NKVD chief in the city), but failed to find photographs or like family mementos, the house having been totally looted by the Germans. For Esther, this represents crushing news that her past is gone forever. She remarks how her maternal grandmother, her aunts and uncles and beloved cousins are all dead, and the deportation ironically saved her parents, paternal grandmother and herself. Esther's mother is distraught at the news as well, wishing now she had said Esther's uncle was a blood relative on their last morning in Vilnius as he would have been taken with them.

Esther marvels at the irony of a "little capitalist" singing the Internationale, learning Russian, and eventually falling in love with the unique, unspoiled beauty of the steppe, so much so that when the war ends and the Rudomins are abruptly informed that they are to be returned to Poland, Esther doesn't want to leave. She thinks of herself as belonging there: she's a Sibiryak, a Siberian. Nearly five years into her exile, the trains return them to Poland in the city of Łódź, where they are reunited with her father.
