= Esther Hautzig =

American writer

Esther R. Hautzig (Hebrew: אסתר האוציג, October 18, 1930 – November 1, 2009, in America) was a Polish-born American writer, best known for her award-winning book The Endless Steppe (1968).

== Biography ==
Esther Hautzig (previously known as Esther Rudomin) was born in Vilna, Poland (present-day Vilnius, Lithuania). Her childhood was gravely interrupted by the beginning of World War II and the conquest in 1941 of eastern Poland by Soviet troops. Her family was uprooted and deported to Rubtsovsk, Siberia, where Esther spent the next five years in harsh exile. Her award-winning novel The Endless Steppe is an autobiographical account of those years in Siberia. After the war, when she was 15, she and her family moved back to Poland, although in her heart, Esther wanted to stay. Hautzig reportedly wrote The Endless Steppe at the prompting of Presidential candidate Adlai Stevenson, to whom she had written after reading his articles about his visit to Rubtsovsk.

== Personal life and death ==
Rudomin met Walter Hautzig, a concert pianist, while en route to America on a student visa in 1947. They married in 1950, and had two children, Deborah, a children's author, and David. She died on November 1, 2009, aged 79, from a combination of congestive heart failure and complications from Alzheimer's disease.

Hautzig helped to discover and eventually publish the master's thesis in mathematics written by her uncle Ela-Chaim Cunzer (1914–1943/44) at the University of Wilno in 1937. Cunzer was taught, among others, by Antoni Zygmund. Cunzer died in a concentration camp.

== Works ==
Many of Hautzig's works are books about everyday life for pre-adolescent and early adolescent children. They encourage exploration and activity. Her Four languages books are written in English, Spanish, French, and Russian.

She maintained deep connections with the expatriate Yiddish literary community. She corresponded with Chaim Potok and wrote the introduction for a new edition of Israel Cohen's cultural history of Vilna (Vilnius). Hautzig's book The Endless Steppe has appeared in dozens of editions and has been translated into many languages, including Catalan, Dutch, Danish, English (Braille), French, German, Greek, Indonesian, Japanese, Sinhalese, and Swedish.

=== Everyday life ===
- Let's cook without cooking. New York: Crowell, 1955.
- Let's make presents. 100 gifts for less than $1.00. New York: Crowell, 1962.
- At home: A visit in four languages. Illustrated by Aliki Brandenberg. New York: Macmillan, 1968.
- In the park: An excursion in four languages. Illustrated by Ezra Jack Keats. New York: Macmillan, 1968.
- In school: Learning in four languages. Illustrated by Nonny Hogrogian. New York: Macmillan, 1969.
- Let's make more presents: Easy and inexpensive gifts for every occasion. Illustrated by Ray Skibinski. New York: Macmillan, 1973.
- Cool cooking: 16 recipes without a stove. Illustrated by Beth Peck. New York: Lothrop, Lee & Shepard Company, 1973
- Life with working parents: Practical hints for everyday situations. Illustrated by Roy Doty. New York: Macmillan, 1976.
- A gift for mama. Illustrated by Donna Diamond. New York: Puffin Books, 1981.
- Holiday treats. Illustrated by Yaroslava. New York: Macmillan, 1983.
- Make it special: cards, decorations, and party favors for holidays and other special occasions. Illustrated by Martha Weston. New York: Macmillan, 1986.
- On the air: Behind the scenes at a TV newscast. Photographs by David Hautzig. New York: Macmillan, 1991. Also available in Braille.

=== Culture and history ===
- The endless steppe: A girl in exile. New York: Scholastic Book Services, 1968.
- Peretz, Isaac Leib. The case against the wind, and other stories. Translated (from Yiddish). With Leon Steinmetz. New York: Macmillan, 1975.
- Peretz, Isaac Leib. The seven good years and other stories. Translated. Philadelphia: Jewish Publication Society of America, 1984.
- Remember who you are: Stories about being Jewish. New York: Crown Publishers, 1990.
- Riches. Illustrated by Donna Diamond. New York: HarperCollins, 1992. Also available in Braille.
- A picture of grandmother. Illustrated by Beth Peck. New York: Farrar Straus and Giroux, 2002. Also available in French.
