= Elektrozavodskaya (Bolshaya Koltsevaya line) =

Metro station in Moscow, Russia

Elektrozavodskaya Электрозаводская
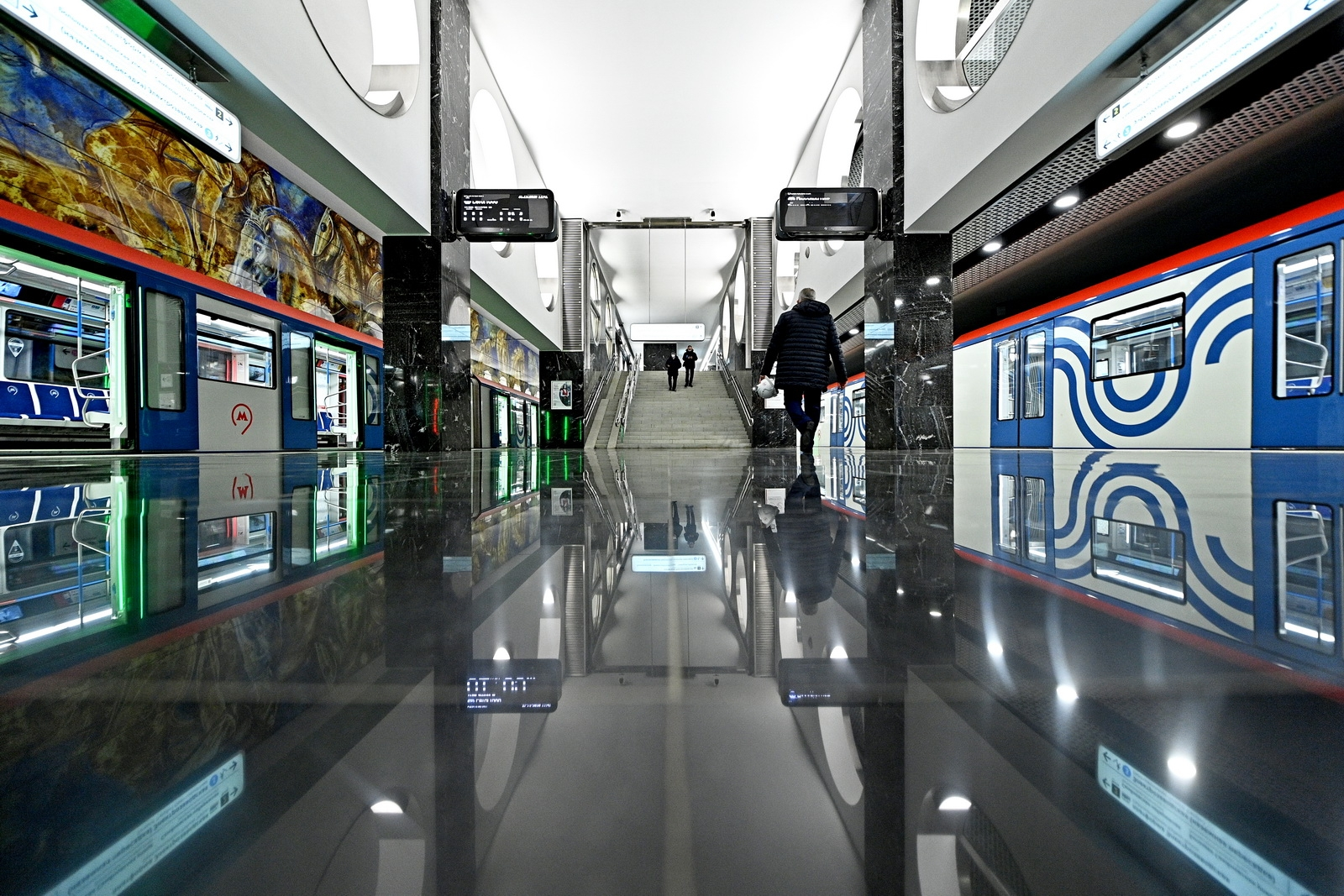

General information
- Location: Basmanny District, Central Administrative Okrug; Moscow; Russia
- Coordinates: 55.780833°N 37.702777°E
- System: Moscow Metro station
- Owner: Moskovsky Metropoliten
- Line: Bolshaya Koltsevaya line
- Platforms: 1 island platform

Construction
- Structure type: Three-span shallow-column station
- Platform levels: 1
- Parking: No

History
- Opening: 31 December 2020

Services
Preceding station	Moscow Metro	Following station
Sokolniki anticlockwise / outer	Bolshaya Koltsevaya line	Lefortovo clockwise / inner
Baumanskaya towards Pyatnitskoye Shosse	Arbatsko-Pokrovskaya line transfer at Elektrozavodskaya	Semyonovskaya towards Shchyolkovskaya
Route map
Bolshaya Koltsevaya line
Location
- Location within Moscow Metro

Elektrozavodskaya (Russian: Электрозаводская) is a station on the Bolshaya Koltsevaya line of the Moscow Metro. The station was opened on 31 December 2020 as a one-station extension from Lefortovo and provisionally functions as part of Nekrasovskaya line. The station serves as a transfer point to the Arbatsko-Pokrovskaya line since 30 December 2024.

== Name ==
During planning, the station was named Elektrozavodskaya; then in June 2015, it was officially renamed Rubtsovskaya. The name comes from the Rubtsovskaya Bank of the Yauza River. In November 2019, the station was renamed back to Elektrozavodskaya.

== Gallery ==
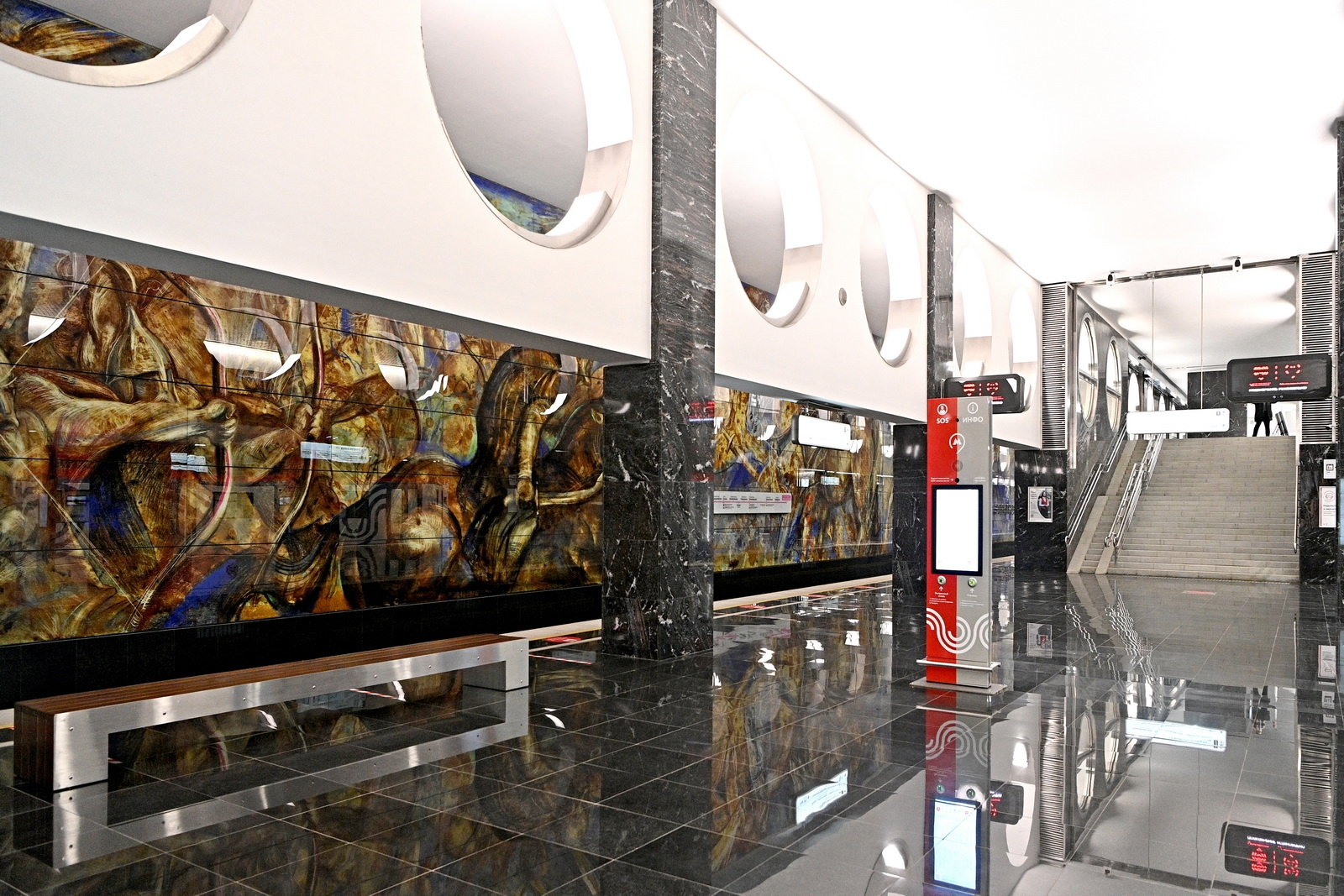
Platform

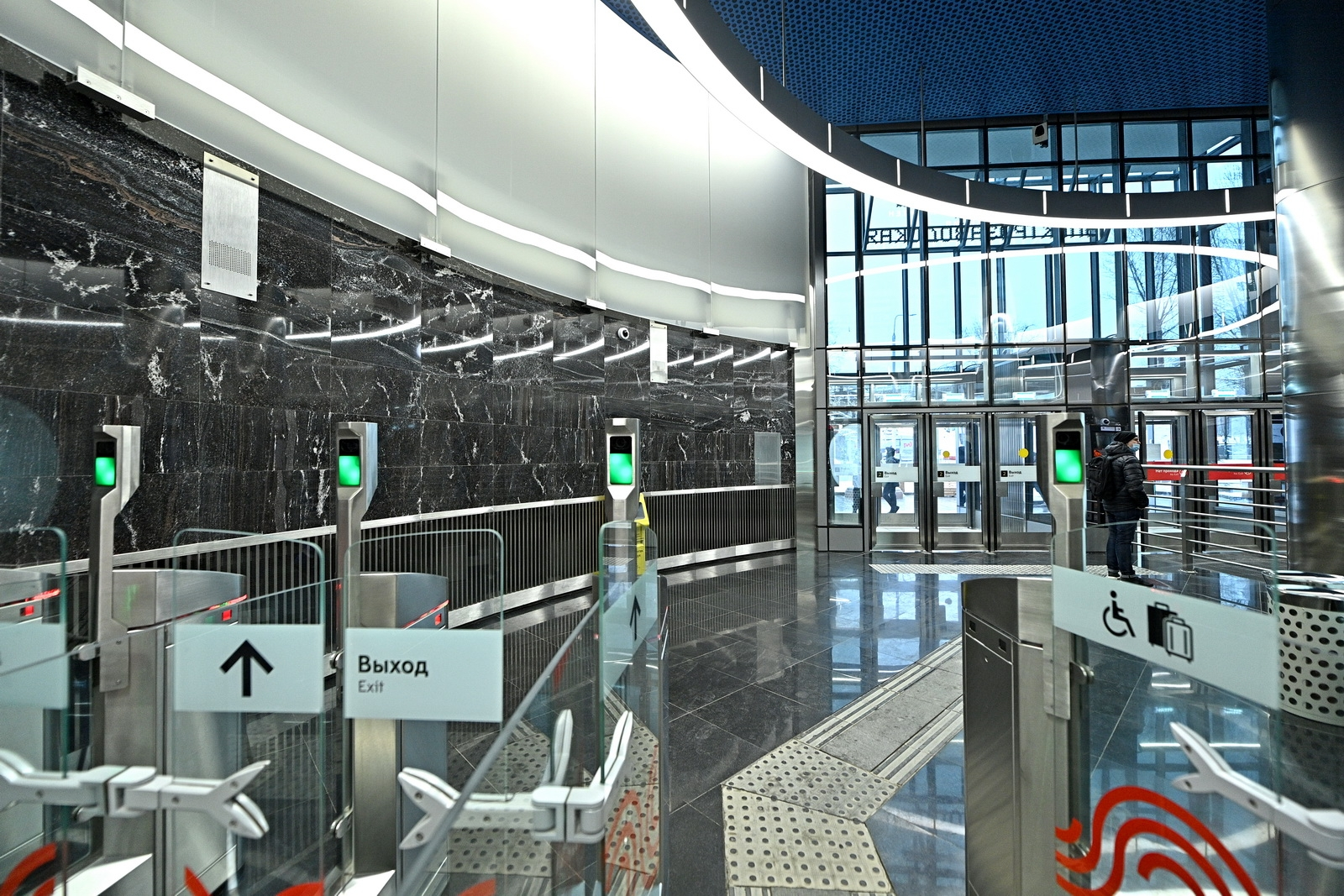
Turnstile hall with facial recognition system

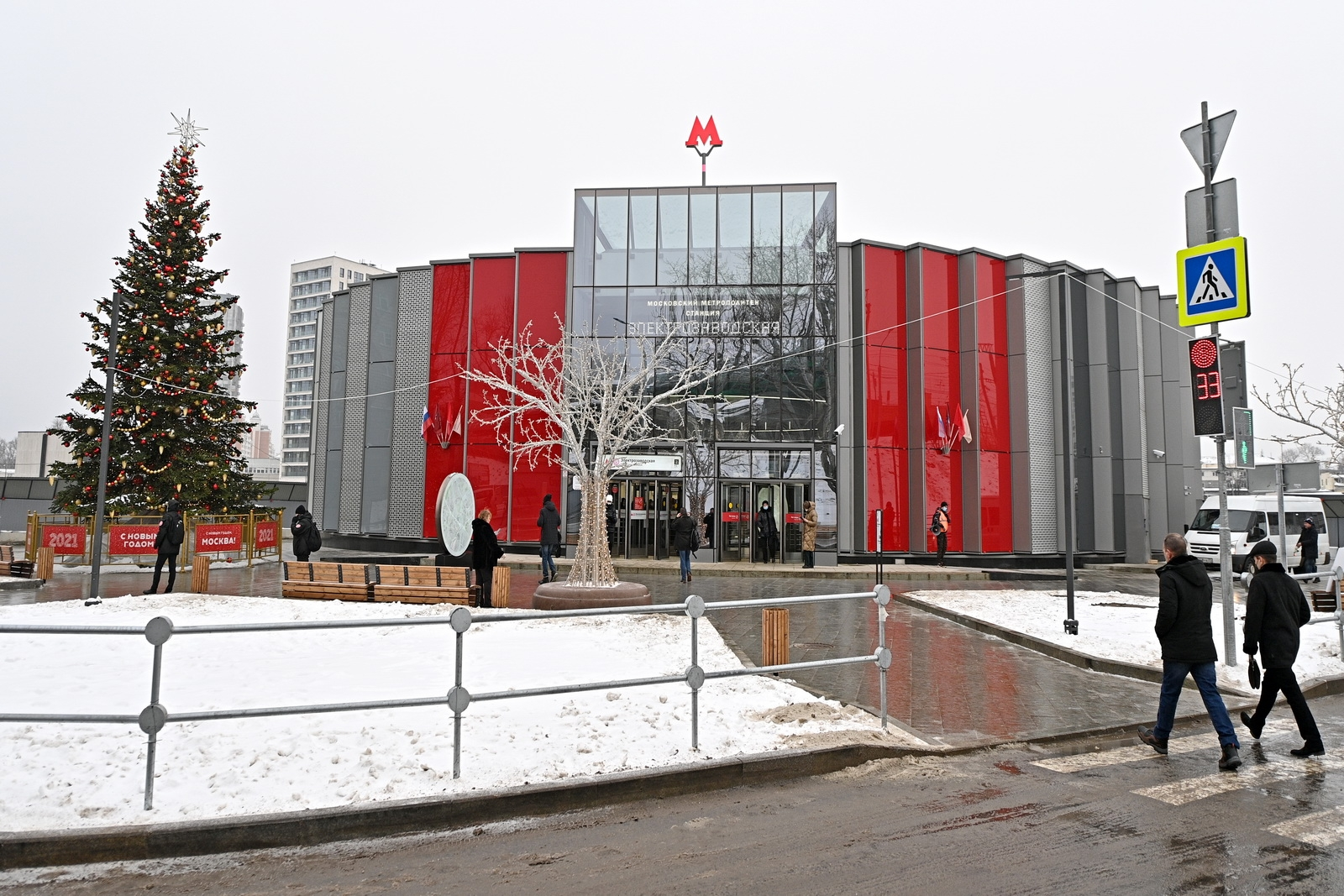
Entrance pavilion

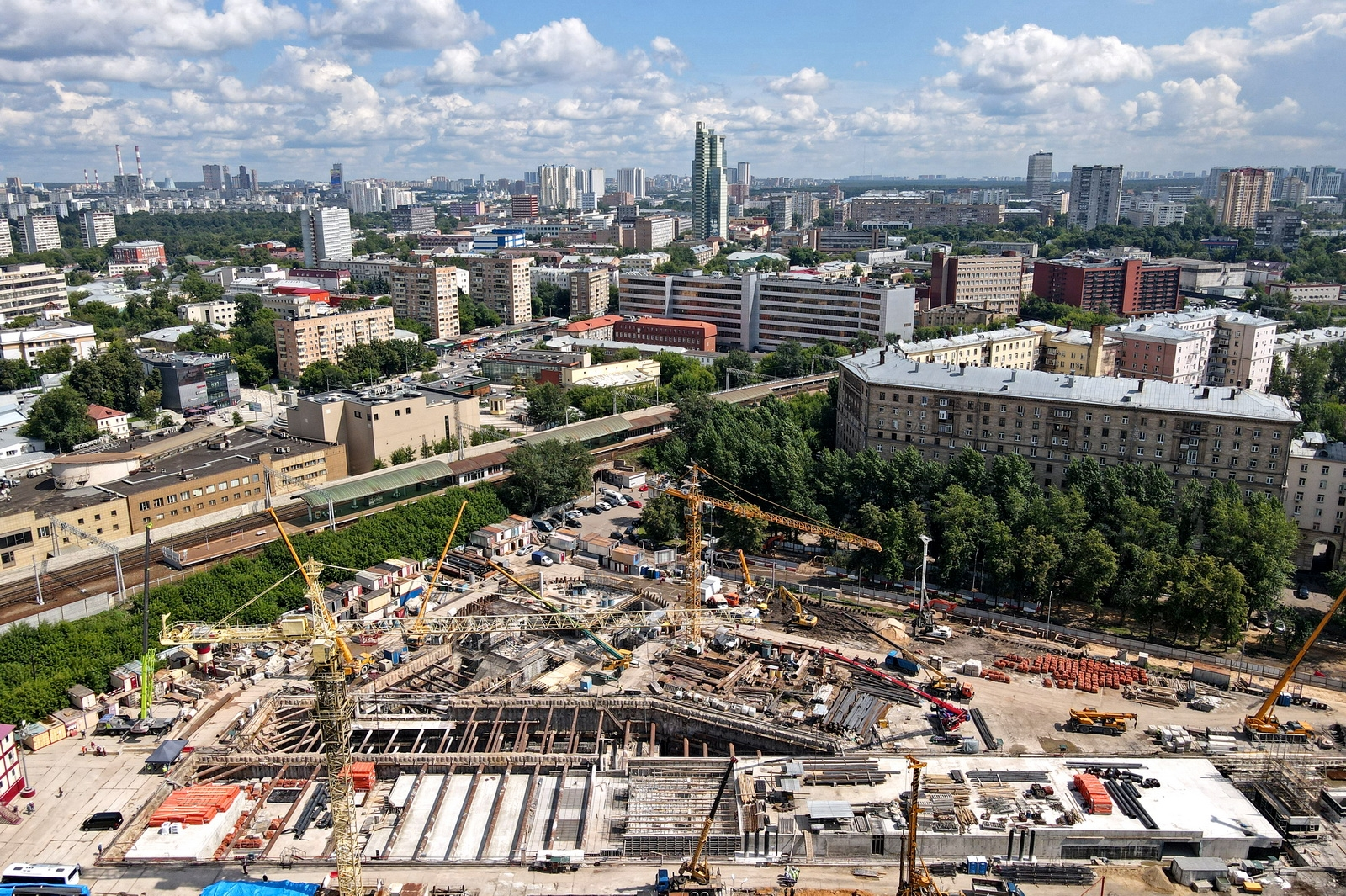
Station under construction in July 2020

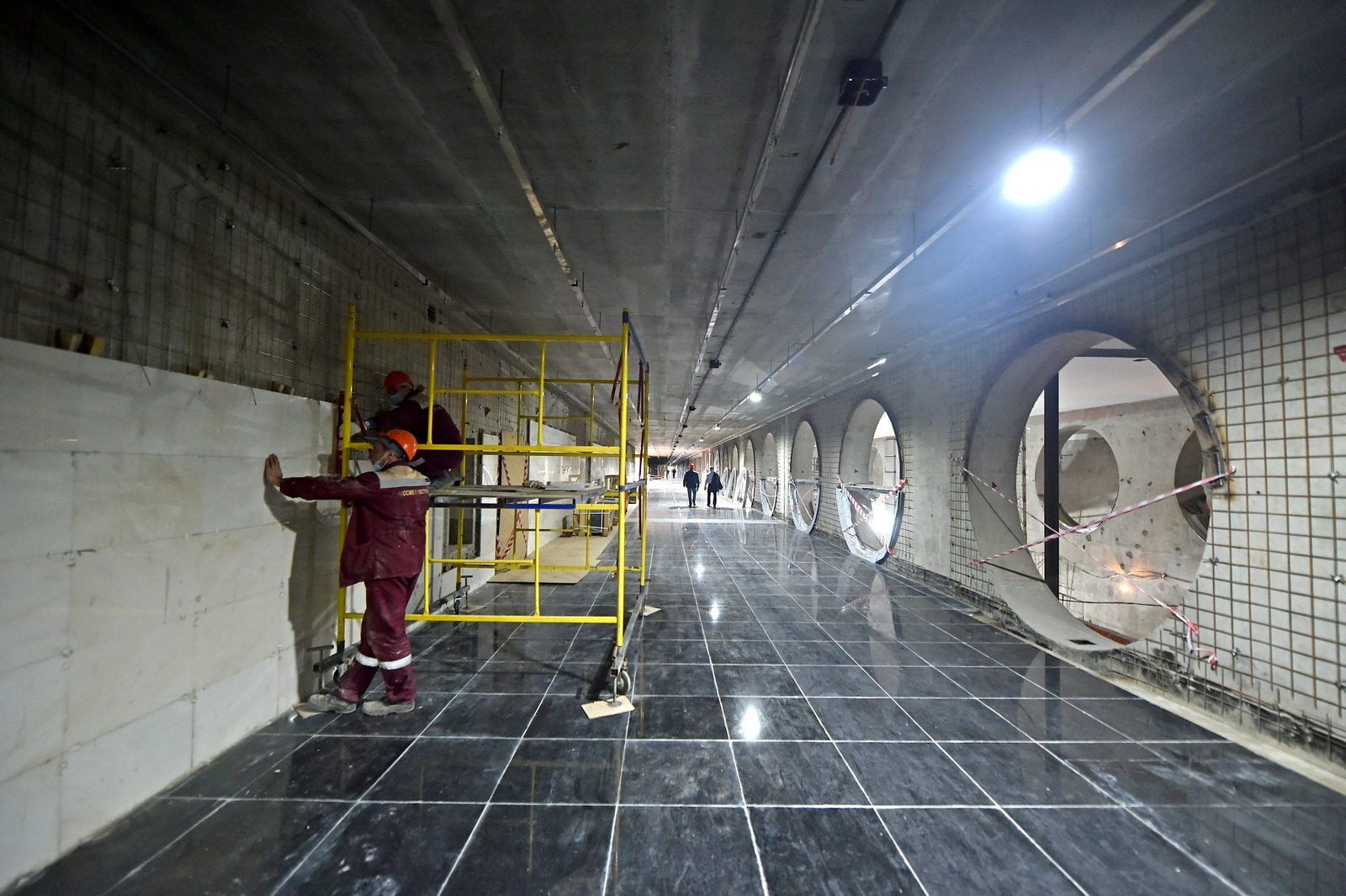
Platform under construction

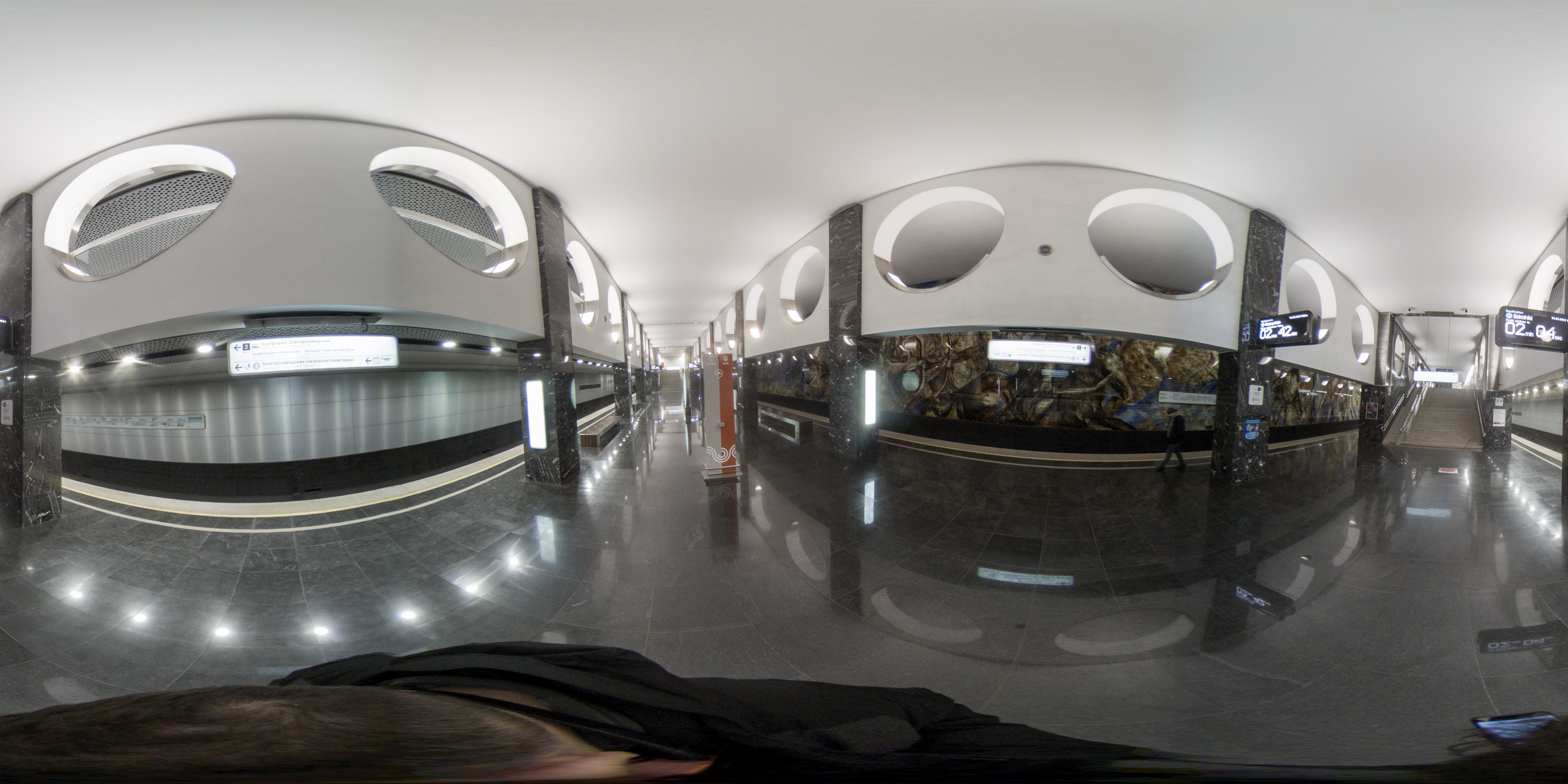
Station hall (view as a 360° interactive panorama)

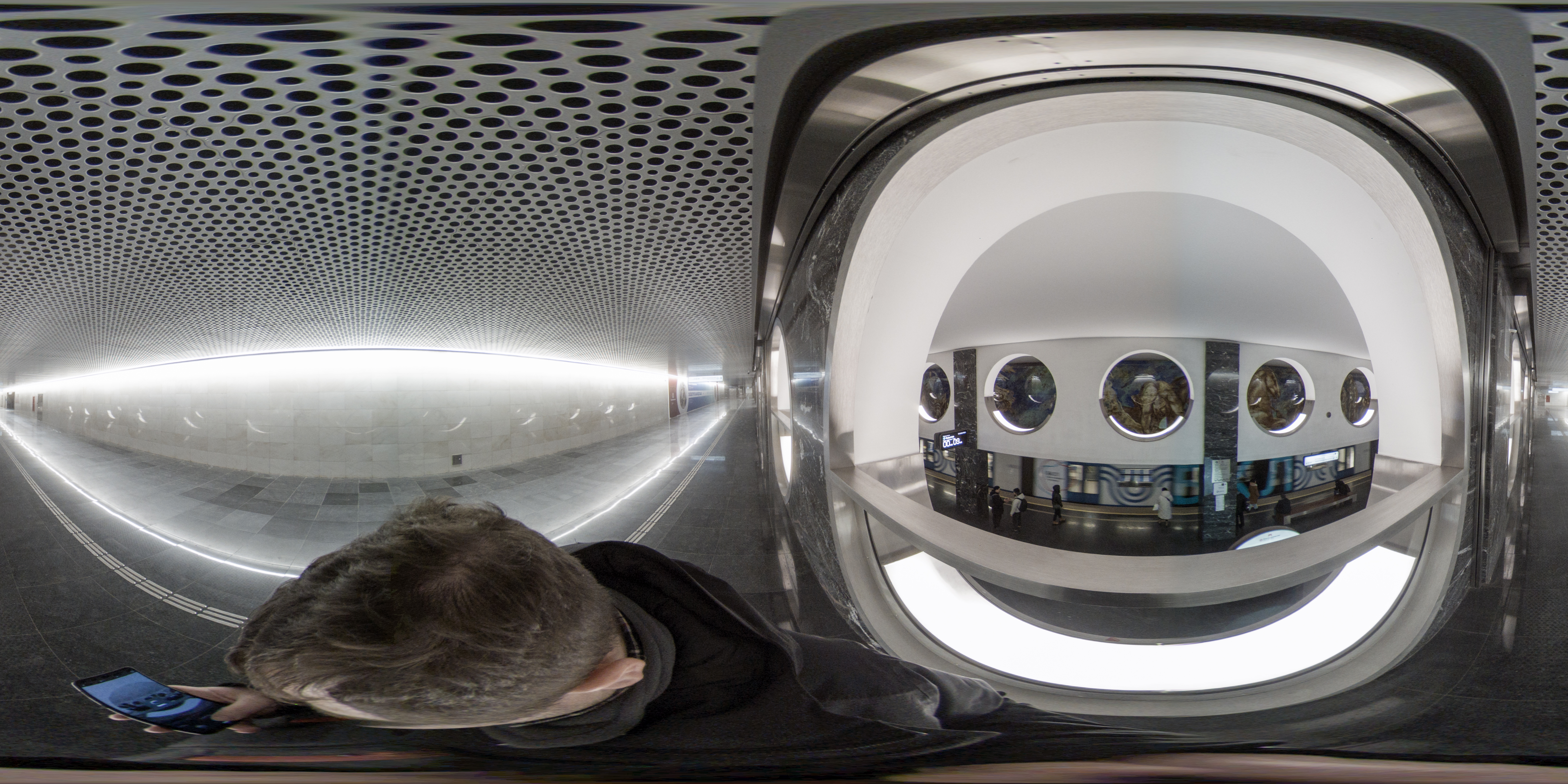
Upper level corridor in station hall (view as a 360° interactive panorama)
