= Walter Hautzig =

Walter Hautzig (Hebrew: ולטר האוציג; September 28, 1921 – January 30, 2017) was a pianist born in Vienna, Austria.

== Biography ==
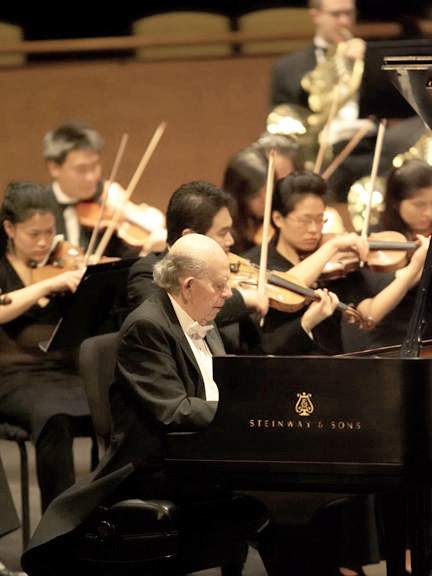
Walter Hautzig playing Grieg's Piano Concerto in A minor with the Asian Orchestra, Atsushi Yamada, conductor, on September 20, 2008 in the Rose Theater at Lincoln Center in New York City.

The Austrian-born American pianist and teacher, Walter Hautzig, studied at Public and High School in Vienna, and the Vienna Academy of Music. He left Austria after the rise of the Nazis to power, and went to Jerusalem and studied at the Conservatory there. In 1939 he came to the United States, continued his musical education at the Curtis Institute of Music in Philadelphia with Harry Kaufmann and Mieczysław Munz, graduating with honors. He also studied privately in New York with Artur Schnabel. In 1943 he won the Town Hall Endowment Award in New York.

Walter Hautzig made his debut at Town Hall in New York in October 1943. He became a naturalized American Citizen in 1945. After World War II, he made tours all over the world, met with brilliant successes in the United States, Latin America, Europe and throughout the Far East and the Near East. During his long career as a concert pianist he has given recitals and orchestral appearances in over 50 countries, earning particular acclaim in Japan, where he has also recorded extensively. He was soloist with Berliner Philharmoniker, Orchestra National Belgique, Oslo, Stockholm, Copenhagen, and Helsinki. Zürich, New York, Baltimore, St Louis, Buffalo, Vancouver, Honolulu, Tokyo, Sydney, Melbourne, Auckland. Wellington, Mexico, Bogota, Jerusalem and Tel Aviv, etc. He has played for BBC, Australian, New Zealand, Japanese, American and Canadian Radio. In 1979 he was selected by US State Department to represent the United States in the first visit of an American pianist to the People's Republic of China since the Cultural Revolution.

Walter Hautzig's extensive repertoire has emphasized the Viennese classicists, as well as Frédéric Chopin, Robert Schumann, Johannes Brahmss and various Russian and Latin-American composers. He also formed a long-term musical partnership with cellist Paul Olefsky, with whom he has often played sonatas of L.v. Beethoven, J. Brahms and Schubert.

Walter Hautzig was Professor of Piano at Peabody Conservatory of the Johns Hopkins University in Baltimore from 1960 to 1988. He is a member of the American Association University Professors, and President of Mieczyslaw Munz Scholarship Fund.

Walter Hautzig's playing is known to record collectors through numerous discs issued by RCA, Monitor, Vox, Turnabout, Musical Heritage Society, Haydn Society, United Artists, Connoisseur Society and Americus. He has also donated to International Piano Archives at Maryland (IPAM) a substantial number of private recordings of his concert and recital appearances. He was contributor to Musical America, American Record Guide.

In October 1950 Walter Hautzig married author Esther Rudomin. They had two children, David Hautzig and Deborah Hautzig.

Walter Hautzig died on January 30, 2017, at the age of 95.

== Pupils ==
- Martin Berkofsky
- Yaron Kohlberg
- Ananda Sukarlan
- Lynn Rice-See
- Andrew Cooperstock
- Allan Sternfield
- Robin Zemp
- Dr. Barry Goldsmith
- Dr. Daniel Paul Horn
- Christine Niehaus
- Keith (Tristan) Rhodes
- Ruth Rose
- Riko (Kohazame) Weimer
- Iravati Mangunkusumo Sudiarso
- Hong-Yi Hiroki Hon
- Barbara English Maris
