= Lefortovo (Moscow Metro) =

Moscow metro station

Lefortovo Лефортово
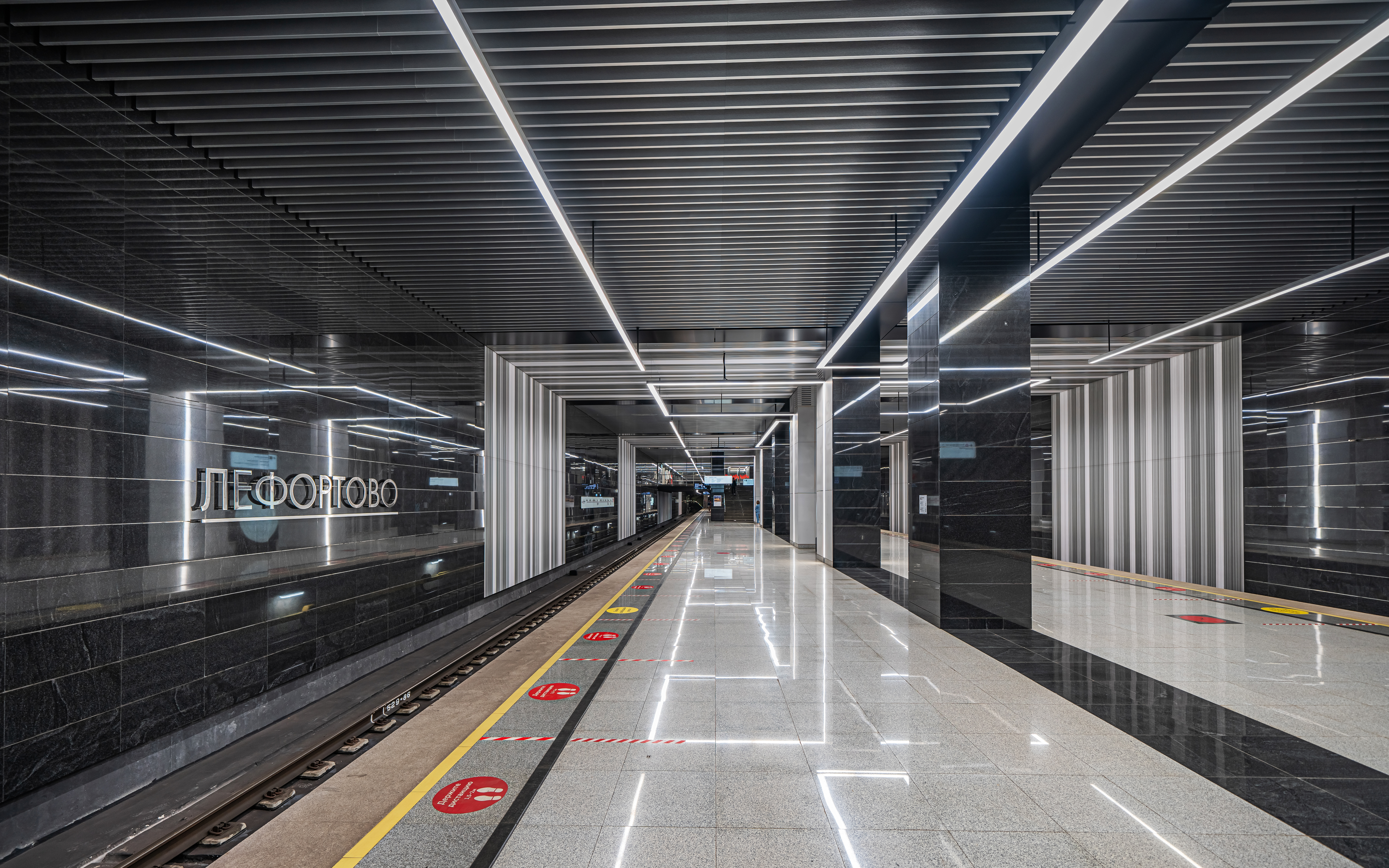

General information
- Location: Lefortovo District, South-Eastern Administrative Okrug; Moscow; Russia
- Coordinates: 55.764444°N 37.702777°E
- System: Moscow Metro station
- Owner: Moskovsky Metropoliten
- Line: Bolshaya Koltsevaya line
- Platforms: 2 side platforms

Construction
- Structure type: Two-span shallow-column station
- Depth: 23 meters (75 ft)
- Platform levels: 1
- Parking: No

History
- Opened: 27 March 2020

Services
Preceding station	Moscow Metro	Following station
Elektrozavodskaya anticlockwise / outer	Bolshaya Koltsevaya line	Aviamotornaya clockwise / inner
Route map
Bolshaya Koltsevaya line
Location
- Location within Moscow Metro

Lefortovo (Russian: Лефортово) is a station on the Bolshaya Koltsevaya line of the Moscow Metro. The station was opened on 27 March 2020 as part of Nekrasovskaya line extension.

== Name ==
The Station is named for the Lefortovo District of Moscow. The district's name comes from Franz Lefort, a Russian military officer and confidant of Peter the Great.

== Construction ==
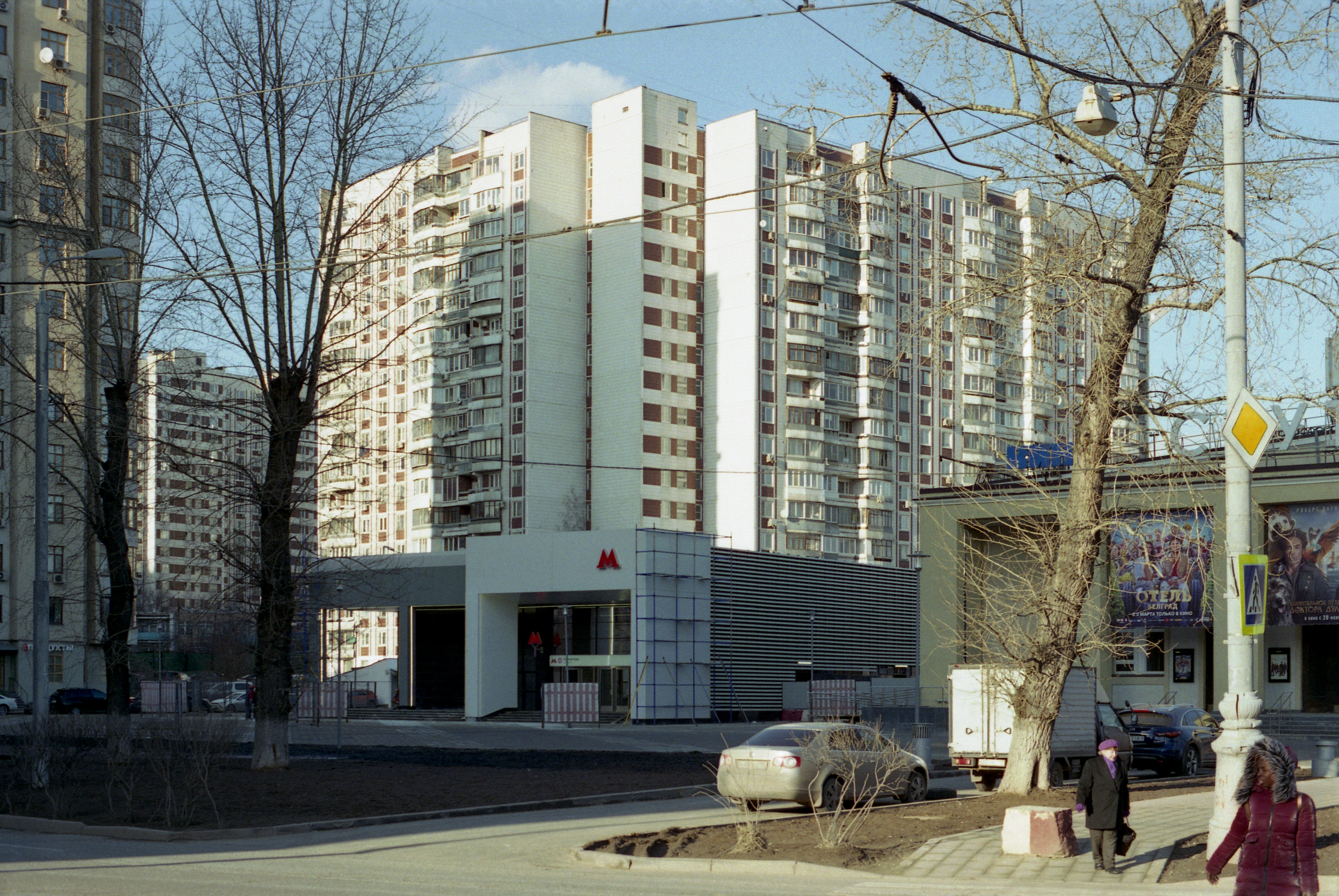
Vestibule of Lefortovo station (2020)

Construction on the tunnels began in August 2016. The tunneling equipment reached Lefortovo in August 2017. The second tunnel reached the station in October 2017.
