= Semyonovskaya (Moscow Metro) =

Moscow Metro station

Semyonovskaya Семёновская
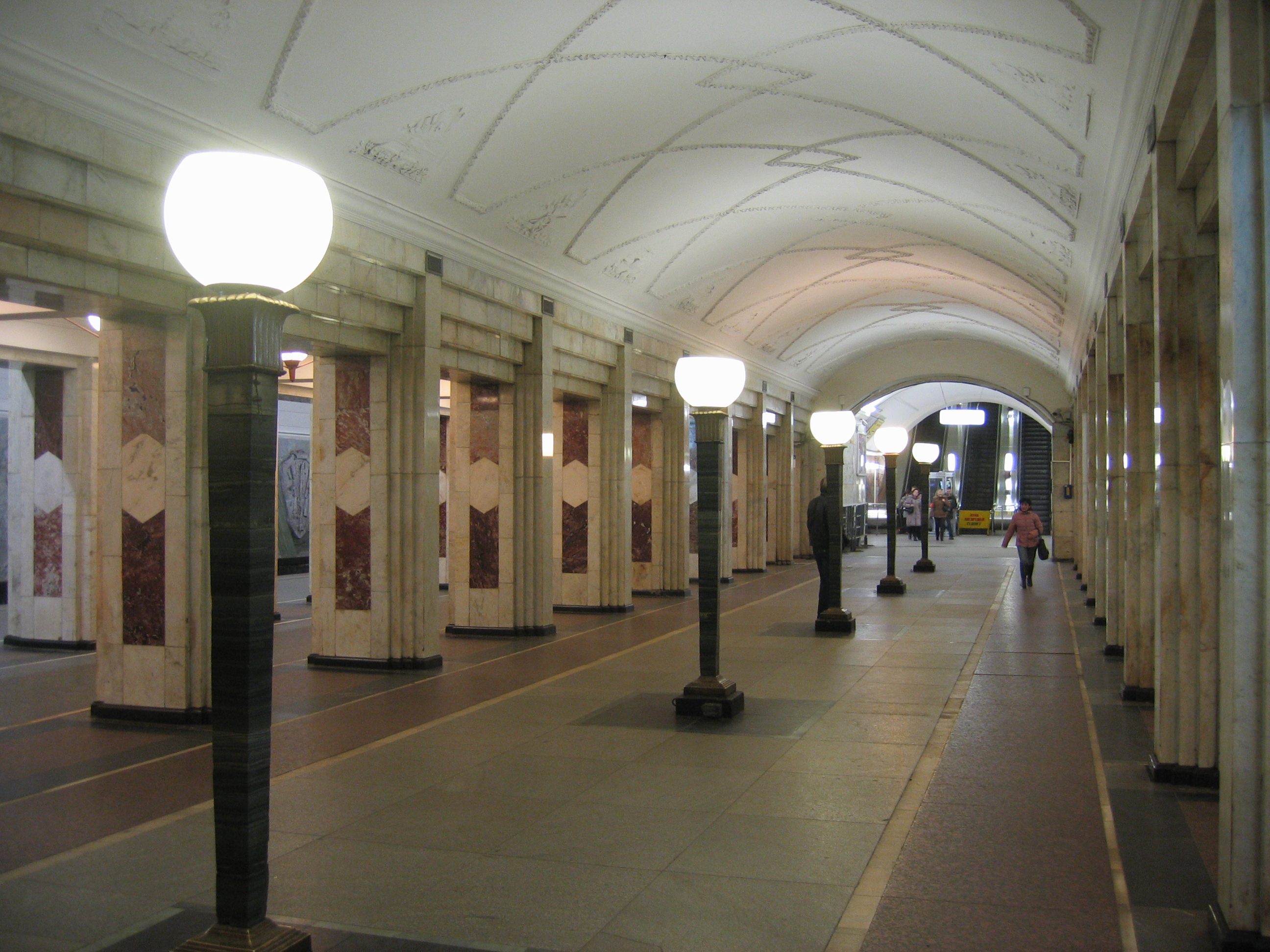

General information
- Location: Semyonovskaya square Sokolinaya Gora District; Eastern Administrative Okrug; Moscow; Russia
- Coordinates: 55.7833°N 37.7208°E
- System: Moscow Metro station
- Owner: Moskovsky Metropoliten
- Line: Arbatsko-Pokrovskaya line
- Platforms: 1
- Tracks: 2
- Connections: Bus: 36, 83, 141, 254, 702, 730; Trolleybus: 22, 87; Tram: 2, 11, 12, 32, 34, 36, 43, 46

Construction
- Structure type: Deep tri-vault column-pylon
- Depth: 40 metres (130 ft)
- Platform levels: 1
- Parking: No

Other information
- Station code: 049

History
- Opened: 18 January 1944; 82 years ago

Services
| Preceding station | Moscow Metro | Following station |
|---|---|---|
| Elektrozavodskaya towards Pyatnitskoye Shosse | Arbatsko-Pokrovskaya line | Partizanskaya towards Shchyolkovskaya |
Route map
Location
- Location within Moscow Metro

Semyonovskaya (Russian: Семёновская) is a station of the Moscow Metro in the Sokolinaya Gora District, Eastern Administrative Okrug, Moscow. It is on the Arbatsko-Pokrovskaya line, between Elektrozavodskaya and Partizanskaya stations. Semyonovskaya opened in 1944.

Originally, the station was called Stalinskaya, as it was built under Stalinskaya Ploshchad. As part of De-Stalinization, the station was renamed in 1961 to Semyonovskaya for the settlement from which the Semyonovsky Regiment took its name.

It was the deepest station in Moscow Metro from 1944 until 1950.

== Design ==
Built concurrently with Partizanskaya, it too is war-themed, sporting plaques along the outer walls depicting a variety of Soviet weapons used in the war, including swords, sniper rifles, and machine guns. A much larger plaque at the end of the platform includes an image of the Order of Victory and the words "Our Red Army- Glory!".

Semyonovskaya is an unusual design, with a double-width platform and four rows of pillars instead of the usual two. This was because the station was built as a pylon type, but was later changed in design and the pylons were transformed into pillars. The pillars are faced with red and white marble. The outer walls are grey marble. There is a row of square-pedestaled, green marble floor lamps along the center of the platform. The architects of the station were S. Kravets and V.Akhmetev.

Stereo image
Left frame
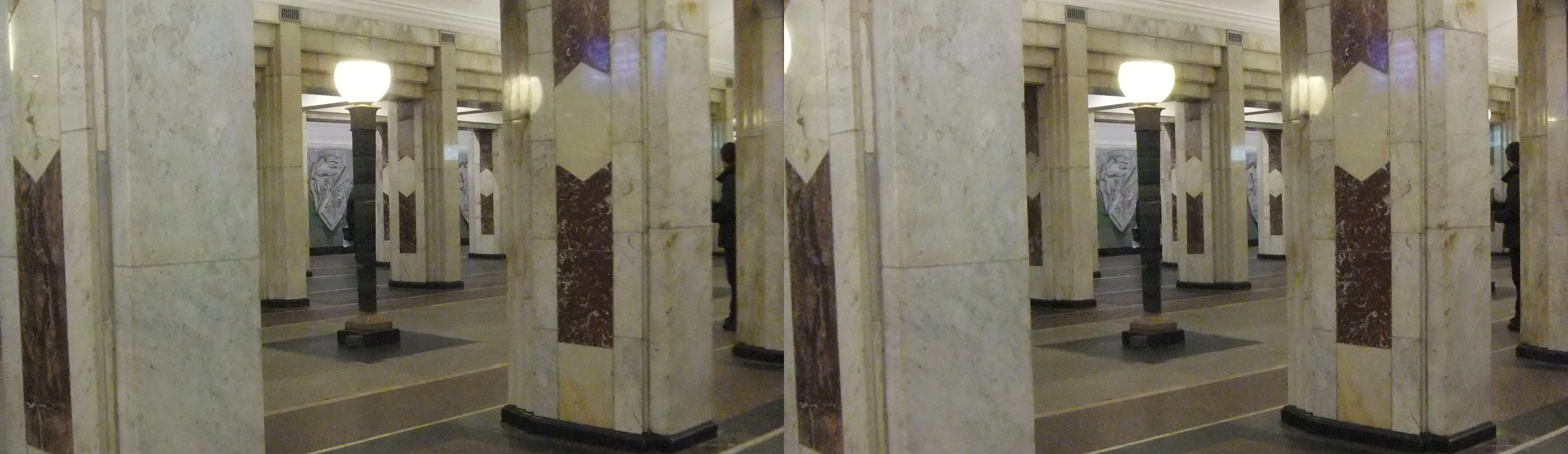
Right frame
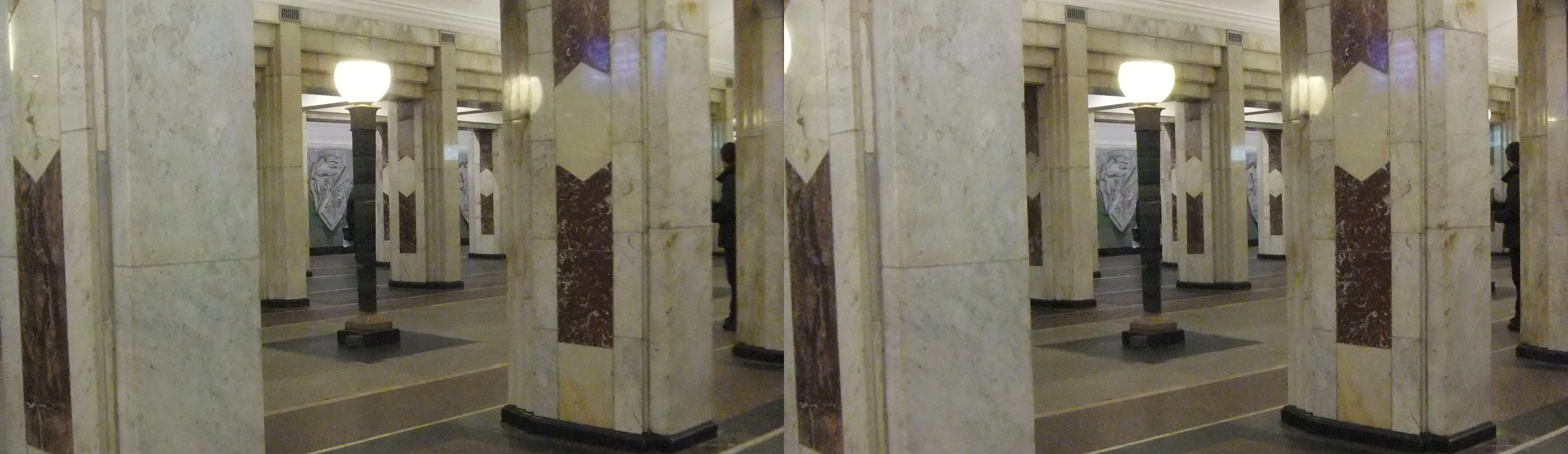
Parallel view
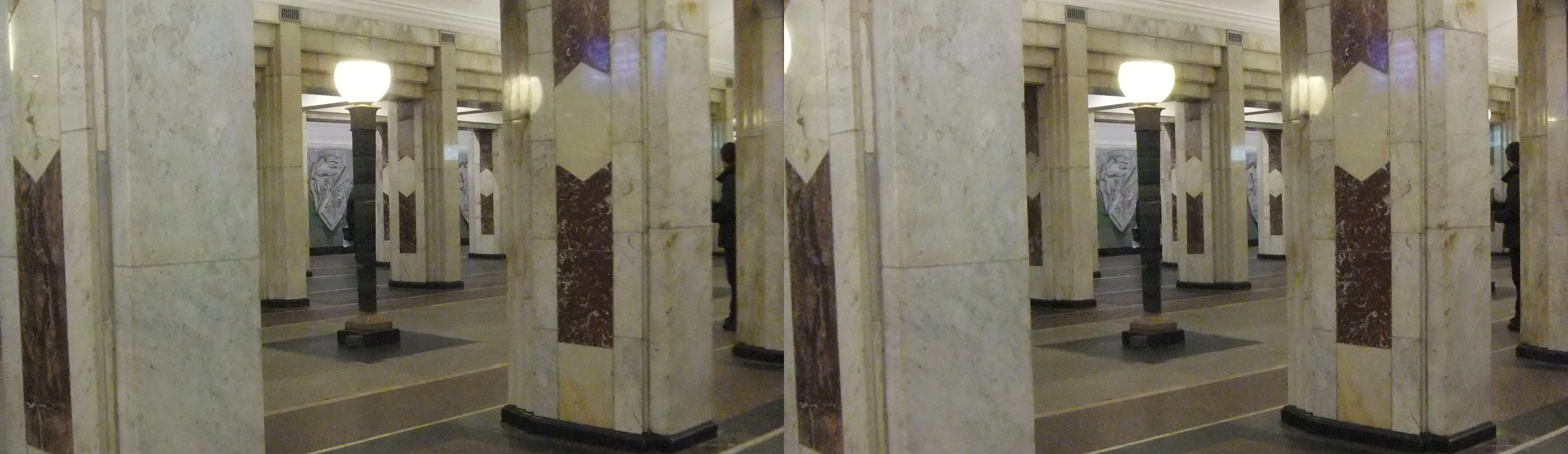
Cross-eye view
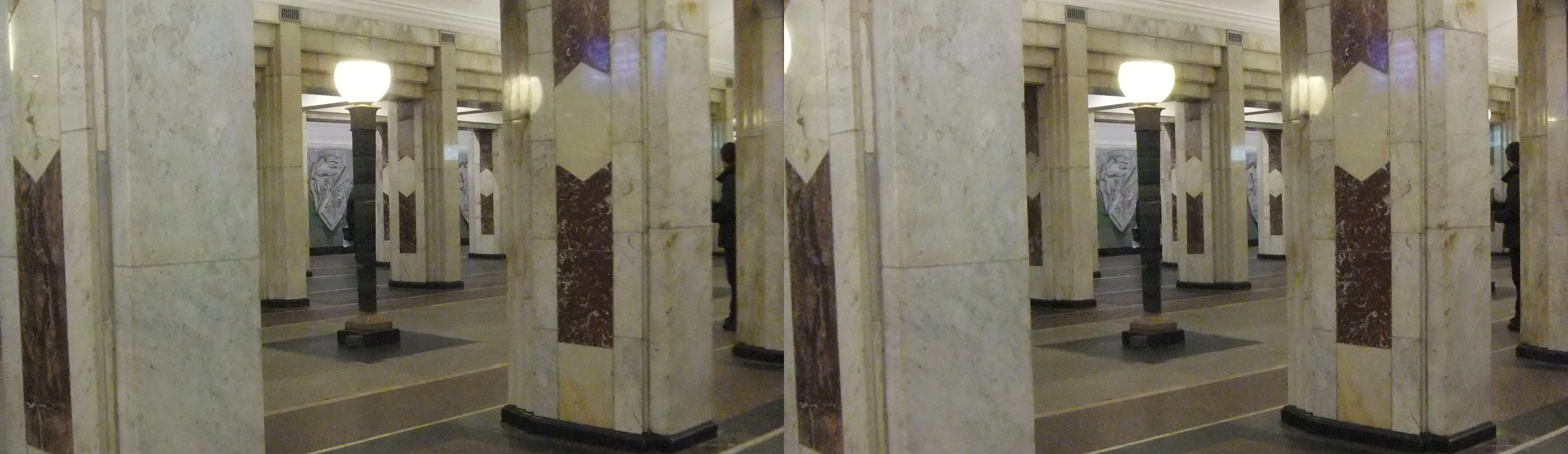

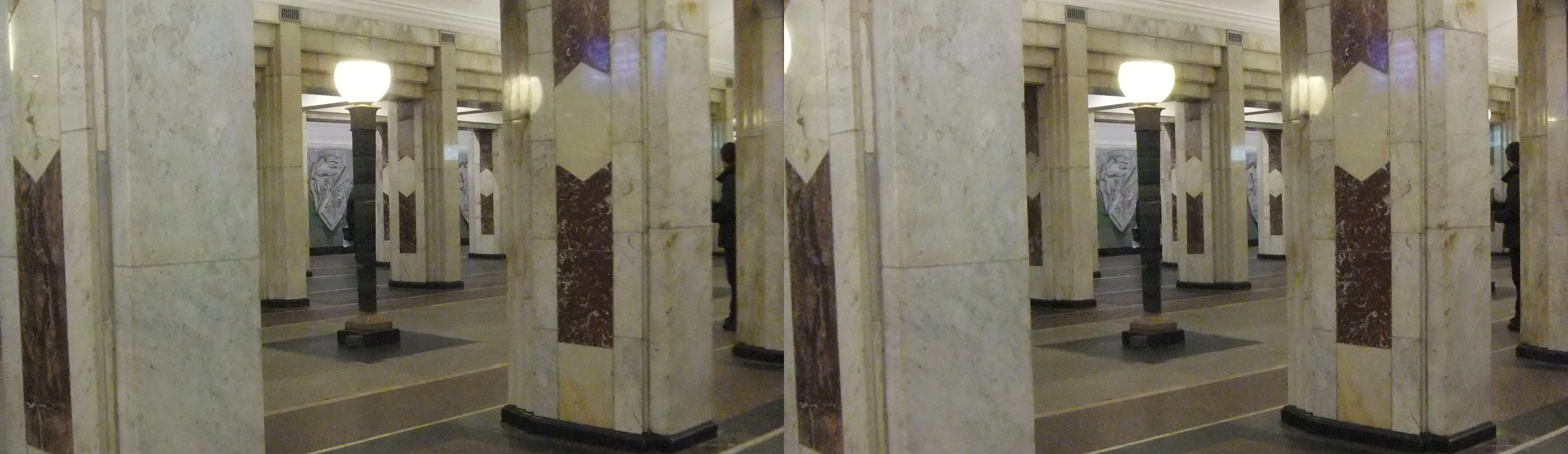
- Central hall of Semyonovskaya station.

The station was closed for escalator replacement and general renovation on the 70th anniversary of the first Metro line, May 15, 2005. It reopened on April 28, 2006, with new escalator machinery and new interior and exterior finishes for the surface vestibule.

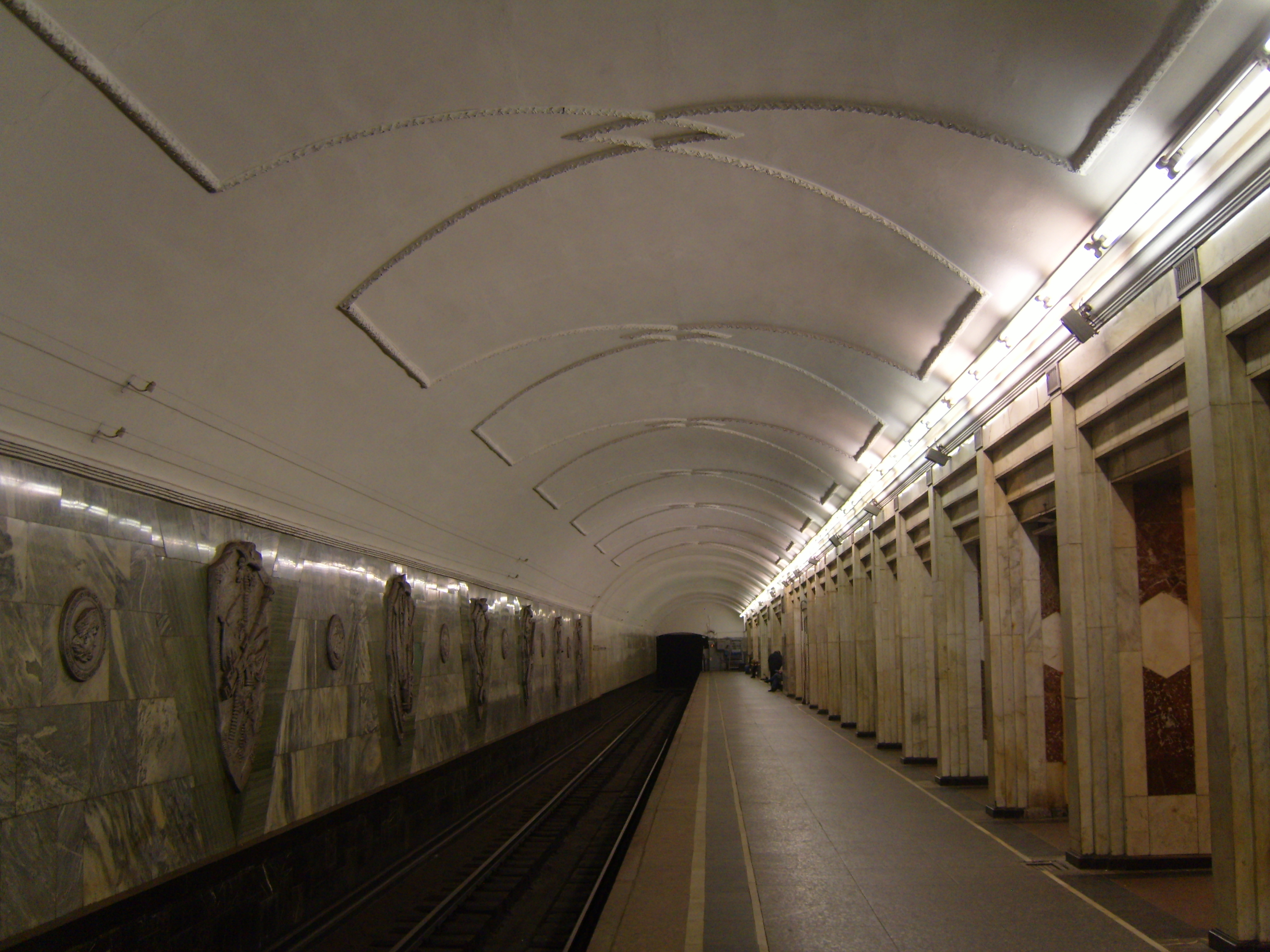
Station platform
