= Rubtsovsk =

City in Altai Krai, Russia

Rubtsovsk Рубцовск
- City
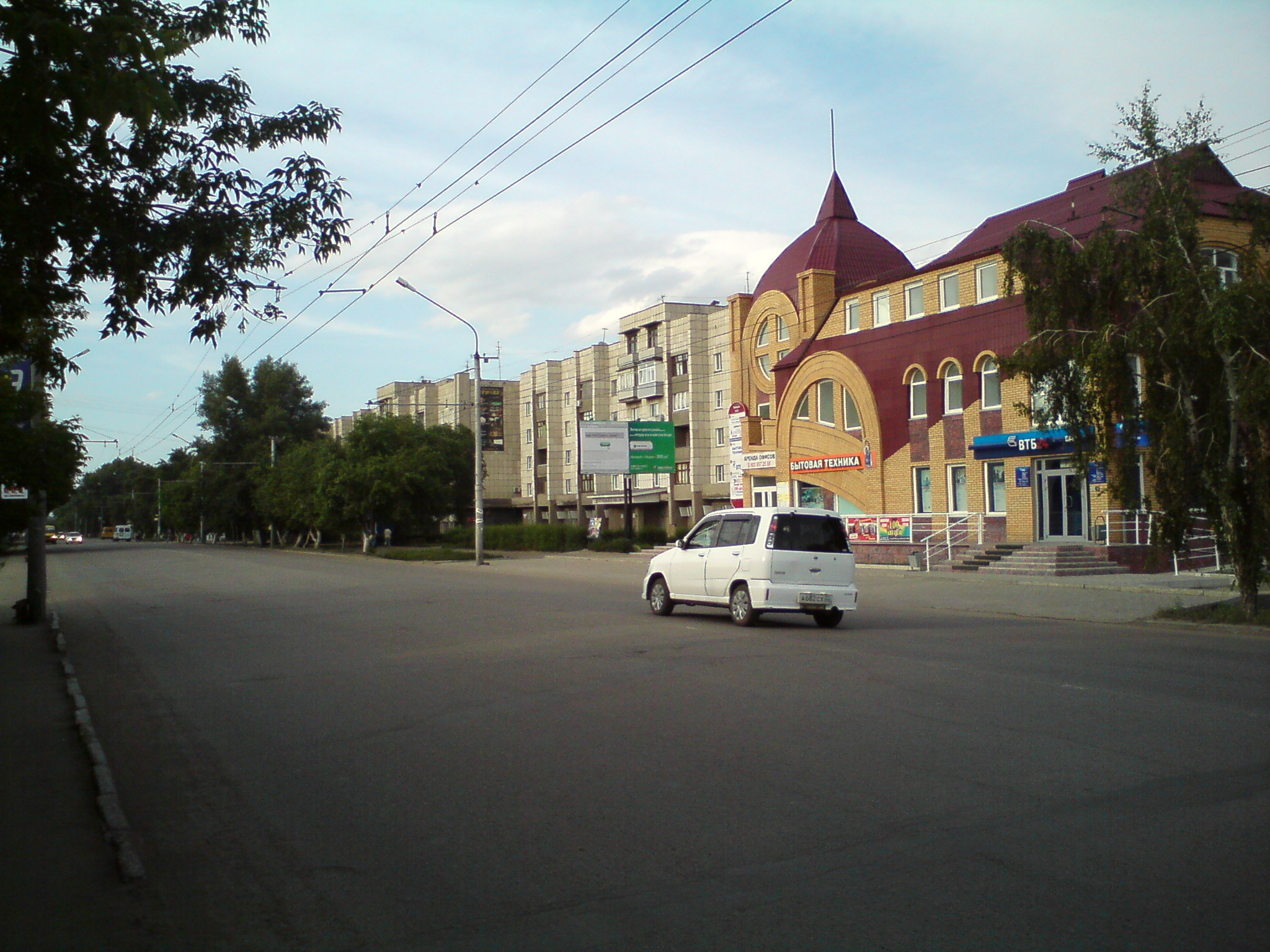
- Lenin prospekt in Rubtsovsk

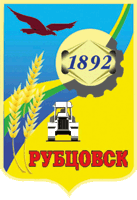
- Coat of arms
- Interactive map of Rubtsovsk
- Location of Rubtsovsk Rubtsovsk (Altai Krai)
- Coordinates: 51°31′N 81°12′E
- Country: Russia
- Federal subject: Altai Krai
- Founded: 1892
- City status since: 1927

Government
  - Head: Dmitry Feldman

Area
  - Total: 84 km^{2} (32 sq mi)
- Elevation: 215 m (705 ft)

Population (2010 Census)
  - Total: 147,002
  - Estimate (2025): 121,698 (−17.2%)
  - Rank: 116th in 2010
  - Density: 1,800/km^{2} (4,500/sq mi)

Administrative status
  - Subordinated to: city of krai significance of Rubtsovsk
  - Capital of: city of krai significance of Rubtsovsk, Rubtsovsky District

Municipal status
  - Urban okrug: Rubtsovsk Urban Okrug
  - Capital of: Rubtsovsk Urban Okrug, Rubtsovsky Municipal District
- Time zone: UTC+7 (MSK+4)
- Postal code: 658200
- Dialing code: +7 38557
- OKTMO ID: 01716000001

Rubtsovsk (Russian: Рубцо́вск, pronounced [rʊpˈtsofsk]) is a city in Altai Krai, Russia, located on the Aley River (Ob's tributary) 281 kilometres (175 mi) southwest of Barnaul. Population: 147,002 (2010 census); 163,063 (2002 census); 171,792 (1989 Soviet census); 167,000 (1975); 111,000 (1959); 75,334 (1939).

Rubtsovsk is the industrial center of Western Siberia. In particular, mechanical engineering. The city-forming enterprises are the Altai Tractor Plant, the Altai Agricultural Engineering Plant, and the Altai Tractor Electrical Equipment Plant.

Later, other large enterprises were put into operation: Rubtsovsk Machine-Building Plant, Rubtsovsk Tractor Spare Parts Plant.

== History ==
It was founded in 1892.

A number of anti-Semitic incidents took place in the city in 1945.

== Administrative and municipal status ==
Within the framework of administrative divisions, Rubtsovsk serves as the administrative center of Rubtsovsky District, even though it is not a part of it. As an administrative division, it is incorporated separately as the city of krai significance of Rubtsovsk—an administrative unit with the status equal to that of the districts. As a municipal division, the city of krai significance of Rubtsovsk is incorporated as Rubtsovsk Urban Okrug.

== Transportation ==
The Rubtsovsk Airport is a derelict airfield which is used most commonly by local youth for drag racing.

== Geography ==
The city is located on the Aley River 281 kilometers (175 mi) southwest of Barnaul, the largest city and administrative centre of Altai Krai.

=== Climate ===
Climate data for Rubtsovsk (1991-2020, extremes 1924–present)
Month	Jan	Feb	Mar	Apr	May	Jun	Jul	Aug	Sep	Oct	Nov	Dec	Year
Record high °C (°F)	4.7 (40.5)	5.2 (41.4)	20.4 (68.7)	31.2 (88.2)	37.3 (99.1)	39.5 (103.1)	40.7 (105.3)	39.6 (103.3)	35.6 (96.1)	27.2 (81.0)	17.1 (62.8)	7.0 (44.6)	40.7 (105.3)
Mean daily maximum °C (°F)	−11.2 (11.8)	−8.4 (16.9)	−0.6 (30.9)	13.0 (55.4)	21.7 (71.1)	26.7 (80.1)	27.7 (81.9)	26.2 (79.2)	19.6 (67.3)	11.0 (51.8)	−0.8 (30.6)	−8.1 (17.4)	9.7 (49.5)
Daily mean °C (°F)	−16.1 (3.0)	−14.2 (6.4)	−6.4 (20.5)	5.8 (42.4)	13.8 (56.8)	19.3 (66.7)	20.7 (69.3)	18.6 (65.5)	12.0 (53.6)	4.7 (40.5)	−5.3 (22.5)	−12.6 (9.3)	3.4 (38.0)
Mean daily minimum °C (°F)	−20.6 (−5.1)	−19.2 (−2.6)	−11.5 (11.3)	−0.3 (31.5)	6.8 (44.2)	12.5 (54.5)	14.7 (58.5)	12.0 (53.6)	5.8 (42.4)	0.0 (32.0)	−9.0 (15.8)	−17.0 (1.4)	−2.1 (28.1)
Record low °C (°F)	−46.9 (−52.4)	−44.7 (−48.5)	−38.4 (−37.1)	−28.2 (−18.8)	−7.4 (18.7)	−1.6 (29.1)	2.6 (36.7)	−1.0 (30.2)	−7.5 (18.5)	−19.5 (−3.1)	−42.0 (−43.6)	−48.7 (−55.7)	−48.7 (−55.7)
Average precipitation mm (inches)	13 (0.5)	14 (0.6)	17 (0.7)	22 (0.9)	33 (1.3)	41 (1.6)	60 (2.4)	39 (1.5)	25 (1.0)	28 (1.1)	27 (1.1)	18 (0.7)	337 (13.4)
Average precipitation days	11.7	9.7	9.7	8.3	9.6	10.0	11.2	9.4	8.1	11.0	12.7	13.2	124.6
Source 1: Pogoda.ru.net
Source 2: climatebase.ru (precipitation days 1936-2012)

== Notable people ==
- Raisa Gorbachyova, activist and wife of former Soviet leader Mikhail Gorbachev
- Yevgeni Kryukov, association football player
- Boris Eifman, ballet choreographer
- Vladimir Ryzhkov, politician
- Aleksei Tishchenko, boxer
- Yekaterina Lobaznyuk, gymnast
- Vladimir Galouzine, tenor
- Yury Kataev, painter and sculptor

== Cultural references ==
Novelist Esther Hautzig recounts her experiences in Rubtsovsk during World War II in The Endless Steppe.

== Twin towns and sister cities ==
- Grants Pass, Oregon, United States
- Changji, China
- Semey, Kazakhstan
