= Rubtsovsky District =

Rubtsovsky District Рубцовский район (Russian)
- District
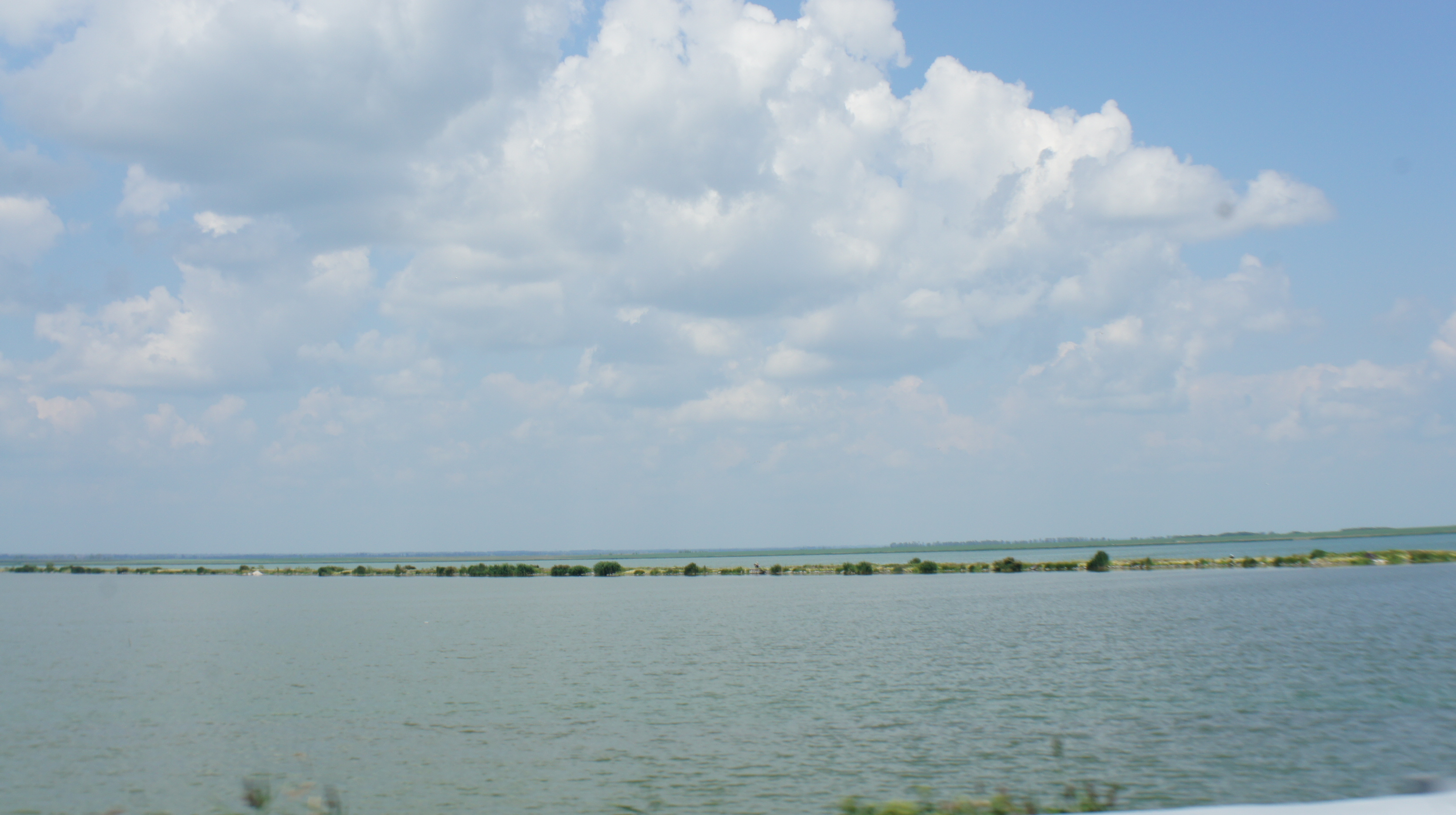

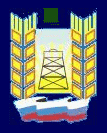
- Coat of arms
- Location of Rubtsovsky District in Altai Krai
- Coordinates: 51°31′N 81°12′E
- Country: Russia
- Federal subject: Altai Krai
- Established: 27 May 1924
- Administrative center: Rubtsovsk

Area
  - Total: 3,339 km^{2} (1,289 sq mi)

Population (2010 Census)
  - Total: 24,556
  - Density: 7.354/km^{2} (19.05/sq mi)
  - Urban: 0%
  - Rural: 100%

Administrative structure
  - Administrative divisions: 17 selsoviet
  - Inhabited localities: 51 rural localities

Municipal structure
  - Municipally incorporated as: Rubtsovsky Municipal District
  - Municipal divisions: 0 urban settlements, 17 rural settlements
- Time zone: UTC+7 (MSK+4)
- OKTMO ID: 01638000
- Website: http://www.radmin.rubtsovsk.ru/

Rubtsovsky District (Russian: Рубцо́вский райо́н) is an administrative and municipal district (raion), one of the fifty-nine in Altai Krai, Russia. It is located in the southwest of the krai. The area of the district is 3,339 square kilometers (1,289 sq mi). Its administrative center is the city of Rubtsovsk (which is not administratively a part of the district). Population: 24,556 (2010 census); 26,407 (2002 census); 26,060 (1989 Soviet census).

== Administrative and municipal status ==
Within the framework of administrative divisions, Rubtsovsky District is one of the fifty-nine in the krai. The city of Rubtsovsk serves as its administrative center, despite being incorporated separately as a city of krai significance—an administrative unit with the status equal to that of the districts.

As a municipal division, the district is incorporated as Rubtsovsky Municipal District. The city of krai significance of Rubtsovsk is incorporated separately from the district as Rubtsovsk Urban Okrug.
