= Kuntsevskaya (Bolshaya Koltsevaya line) =

Moscow Metro station

Kuntsevskaya Кунцевская
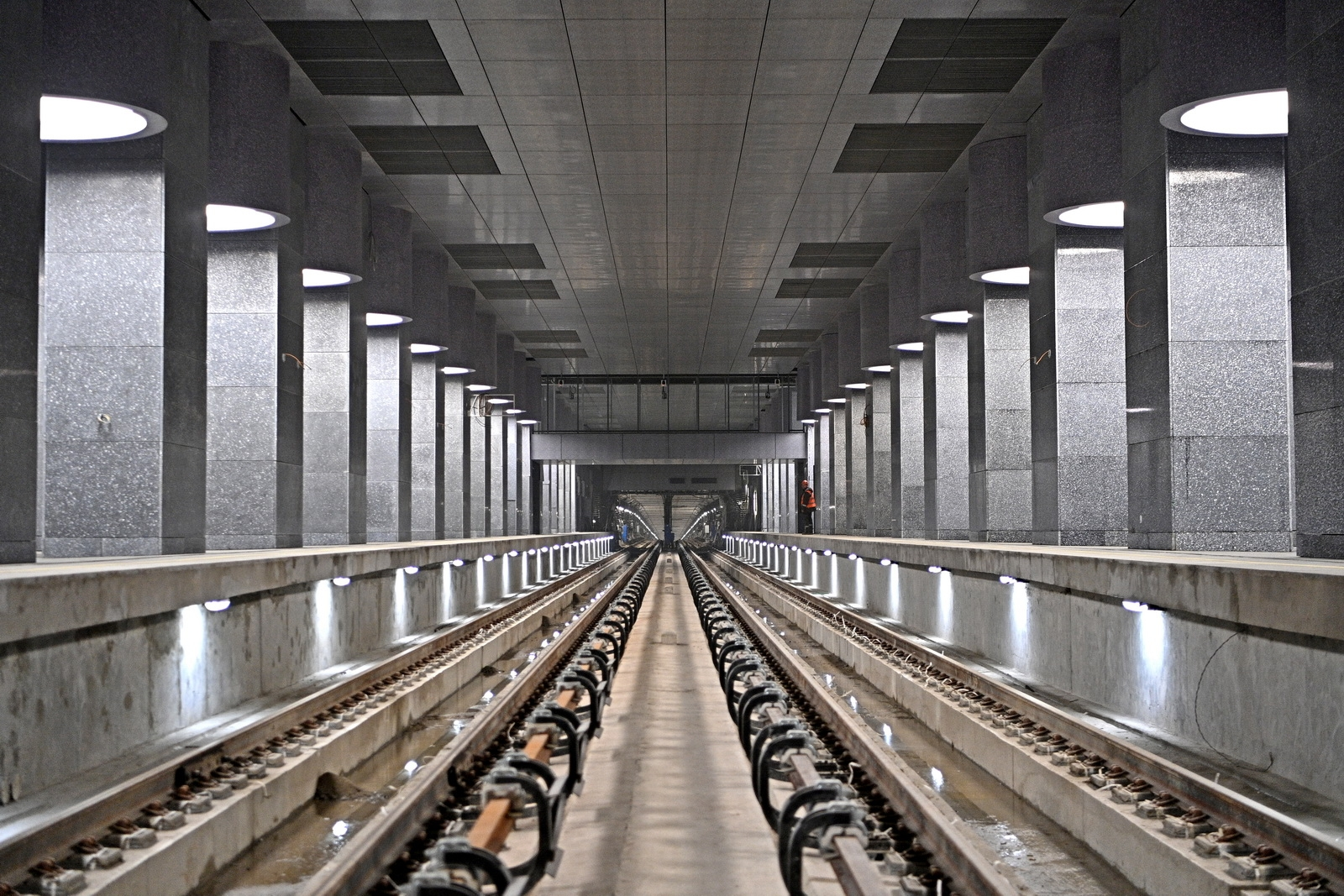

General information
- Location: Moscow; Russia
- System: Moscow Metro station
- Owner: Moskovsky Metropoliten
- Line: Bolshaya Koltsevaya line

Construction
- Architect: Ivan Kolmanok, Alexander Tomashenko (AI-Architects)

History
- Opened: 7 December 2021; 4 years ago

Services
Preceding station	Moscow Metro	Following station
Davydkovo anticlockwise / outer	Bolshaya Koltsevaya line	Terekhovo clockwise / inner
Molodyozhnaya towards Pyatnitskoye Shosse	Arbatsko-Pokrovskaya line transfer at Kuntsevskaya	Slavyansky Bulvar towards Shchyolkovskaya
Terminus	Filyovskaya line transfer at Kuntsevskaya	Pionerskaya towards Aleksandrovsky Sad
Route map
Location
- Location within Moscow Metro

Kuntsevskaya (Russian: Кунцевская) a station on the Bolshaya Koltsevaya line of the Moscow Metro. It was opened on 7 December 2021 as part of the section between Mnyovniki and Kakhovskaya. It includes transfer to Kuntsevskaya. However, the station is widely criticised for its long transfer tunnels, as well as for narrow platforms.

== Gallery ==
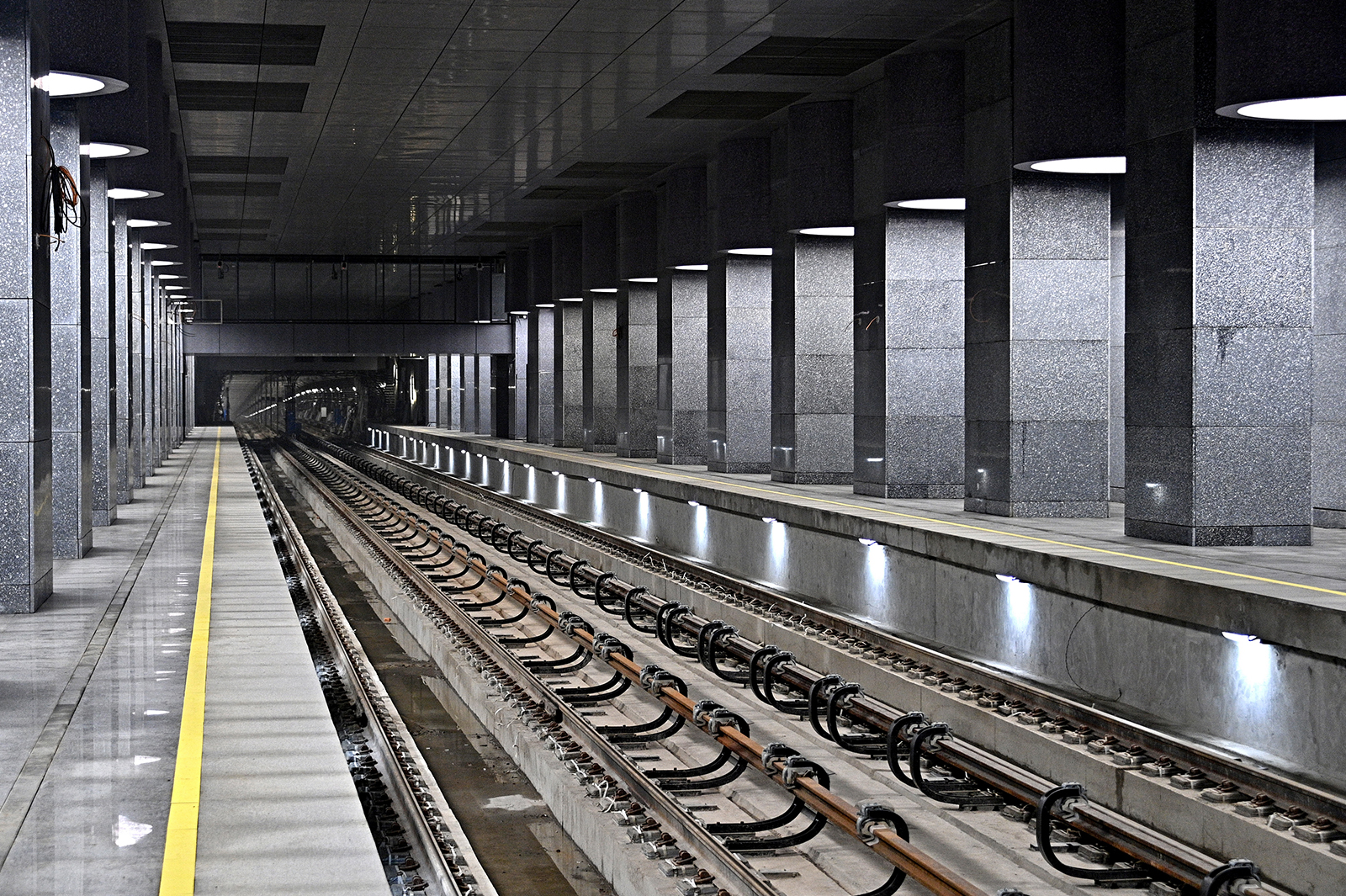
Station hall and platform

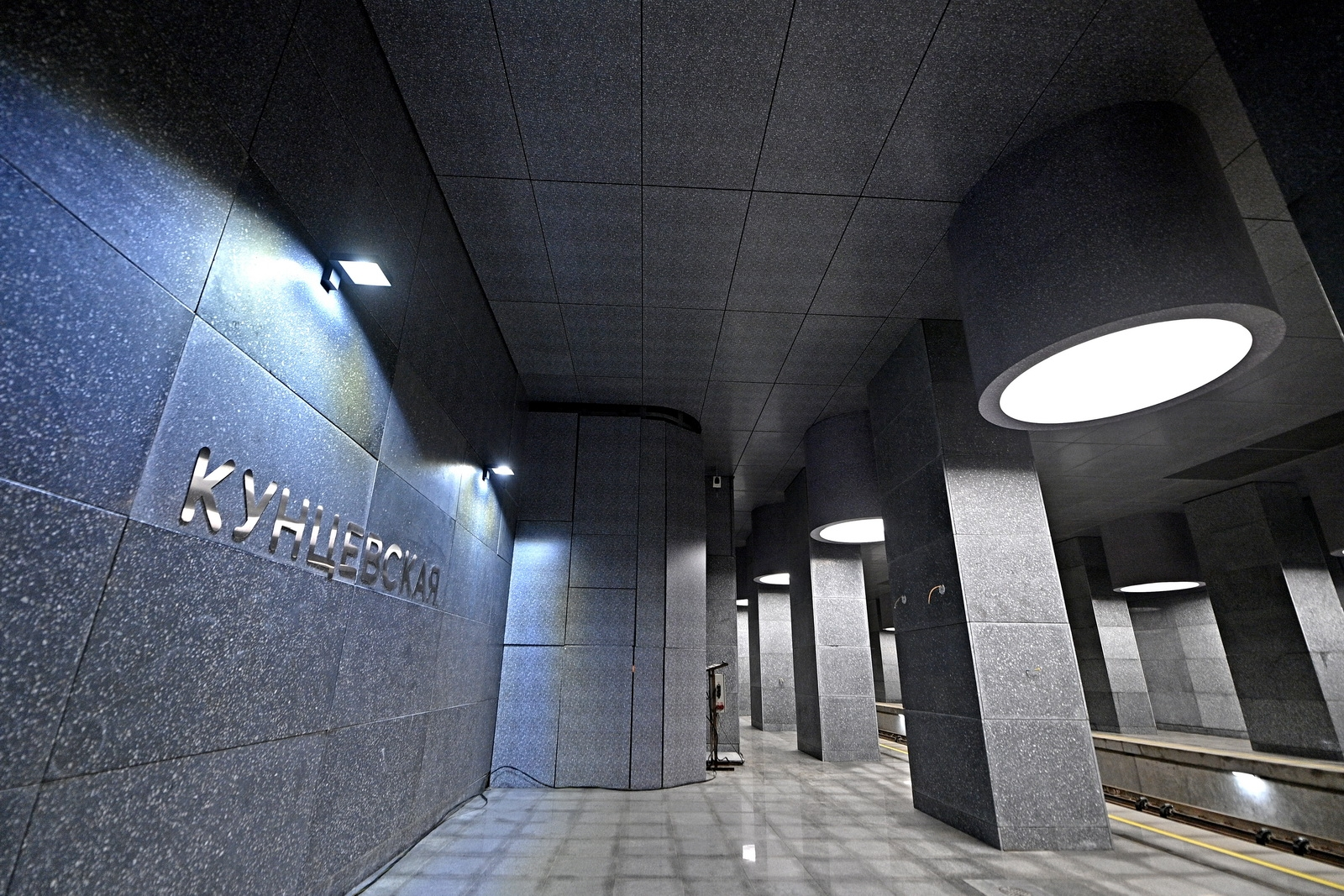
Column and wall with name of the station

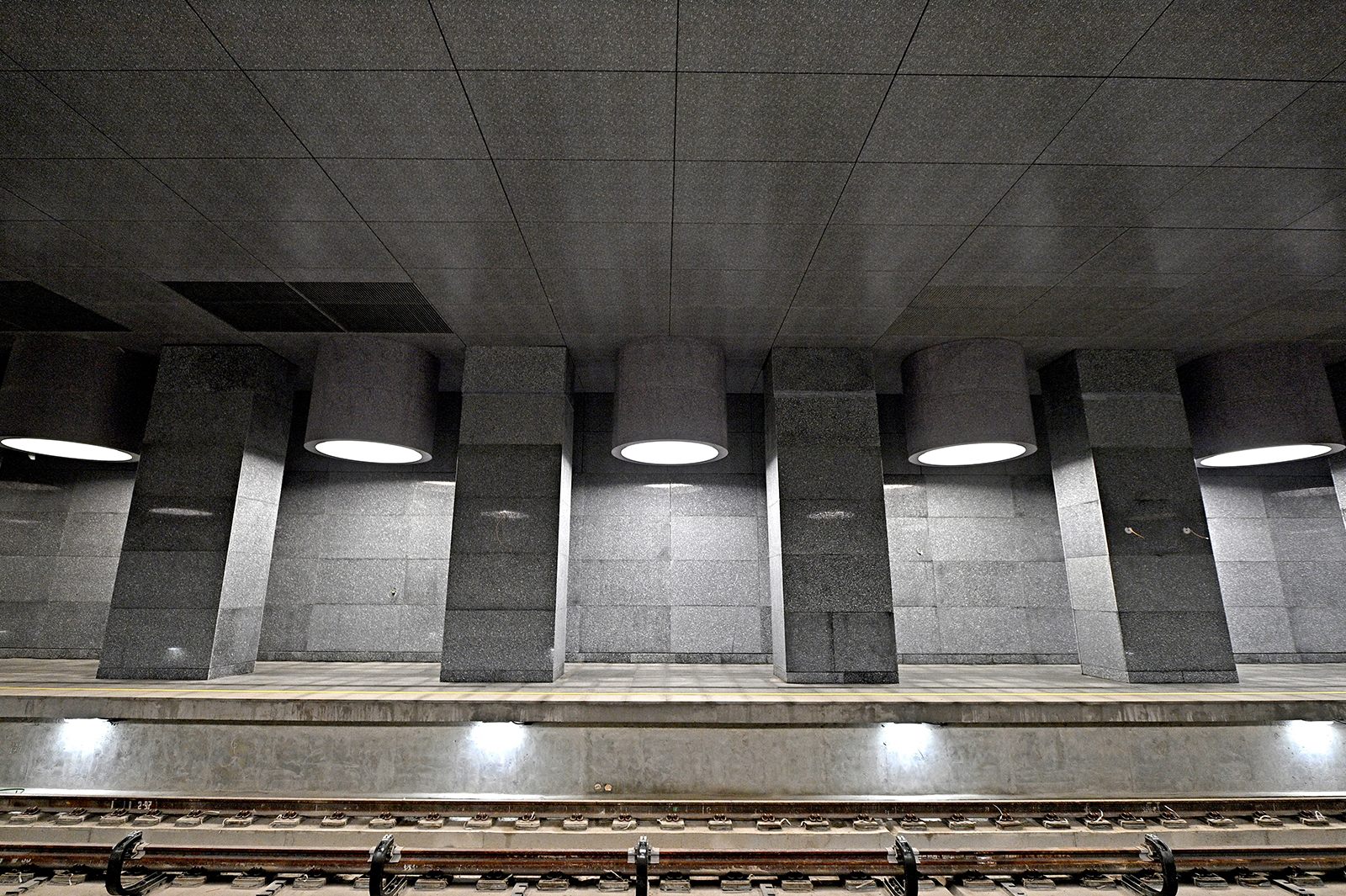
Side view of station columns

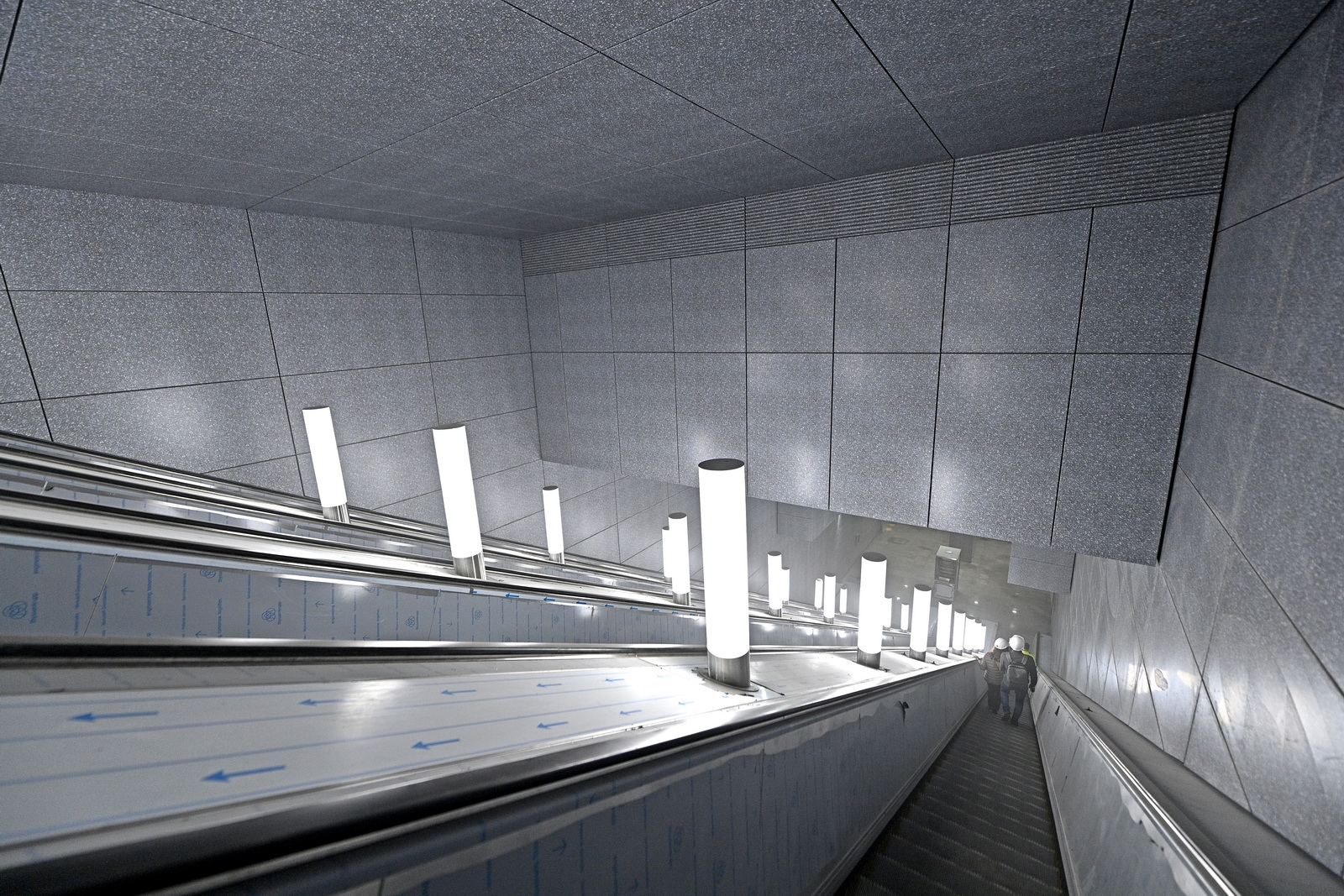
Escalators
