= Kuntsevskaya =

Kuntsevskaya may refer to:

- Kuntsevskaya (Arbatsko-Pokrovskaya and Filyovskaya lines), a station of the Arbatsko-Pokrovskaya and Filyovskaya lines, Moscow Metro, Russia
- Kuntsevskaya (Bolshaya Koltsevaya line), a station of the Bolshaya Koltsevaya line, Moscow Metro, Russia
