= 2014 Moscow Metro derailment =

Train accident in Russia

- The crashed train 81-740/741 in a tunnel

Details
- Date: 15 July 2014
- Location: Moscow
- Coordinates: 55°44′11″N 37°30′56″E
- Country: Russia
- Line: Arbatsko-Pokrovskaya line
- Operator: Moscow Metro
- Incident type: Derailment
- Cause: Incorrectly installed switch.

Statistics
- Deaths: 24
- Injured: 160 (estimated)
Track diagram

On 15 July 2014, at around 8:40 am MSK (UTC+03:00), an outbound Moscow Metro train derailed between Park Pobedy and Slavyansky Bulvar stations of the Arbatsko-Pokrovskaya Line. Casualties reported include 24 dead and 160 injured. Early reports suggested a power surge or a terrorist attack to be the cause of the derailment, but both were soon dismissed.

This accident was the deadliest ever recorded in the history of the Moscow metro system, and the second to occur due to a technical failure (after the 1982 Aviamotornaya escalator accident).

== Background ==
Site of derailment

The Moscow Metro, one of the busiest in the world and serving up to nine million passengers daily, covered 325.4 kilometres (202.2 mi) of route and included 194 stations at the time of the derailment. Despite having a reputation for reliability, the system has been increasingly suffering from mismanagement, cost-cutting practices, poor maintenance, and outages in recent years.

According to several media reports, a Facebook user announced that two weeks before the disaster, he filed an official request to the head of the underground system reporting "problems with the tracks." The user quoted from the reply received in his e-mail: "The tracks are maintained in conformity with the technical standards and tolerances. Problems with mechanical switches in the joints have not been detected, being that the size of the gaps correspond to the technical regulations."

== Derailment ==
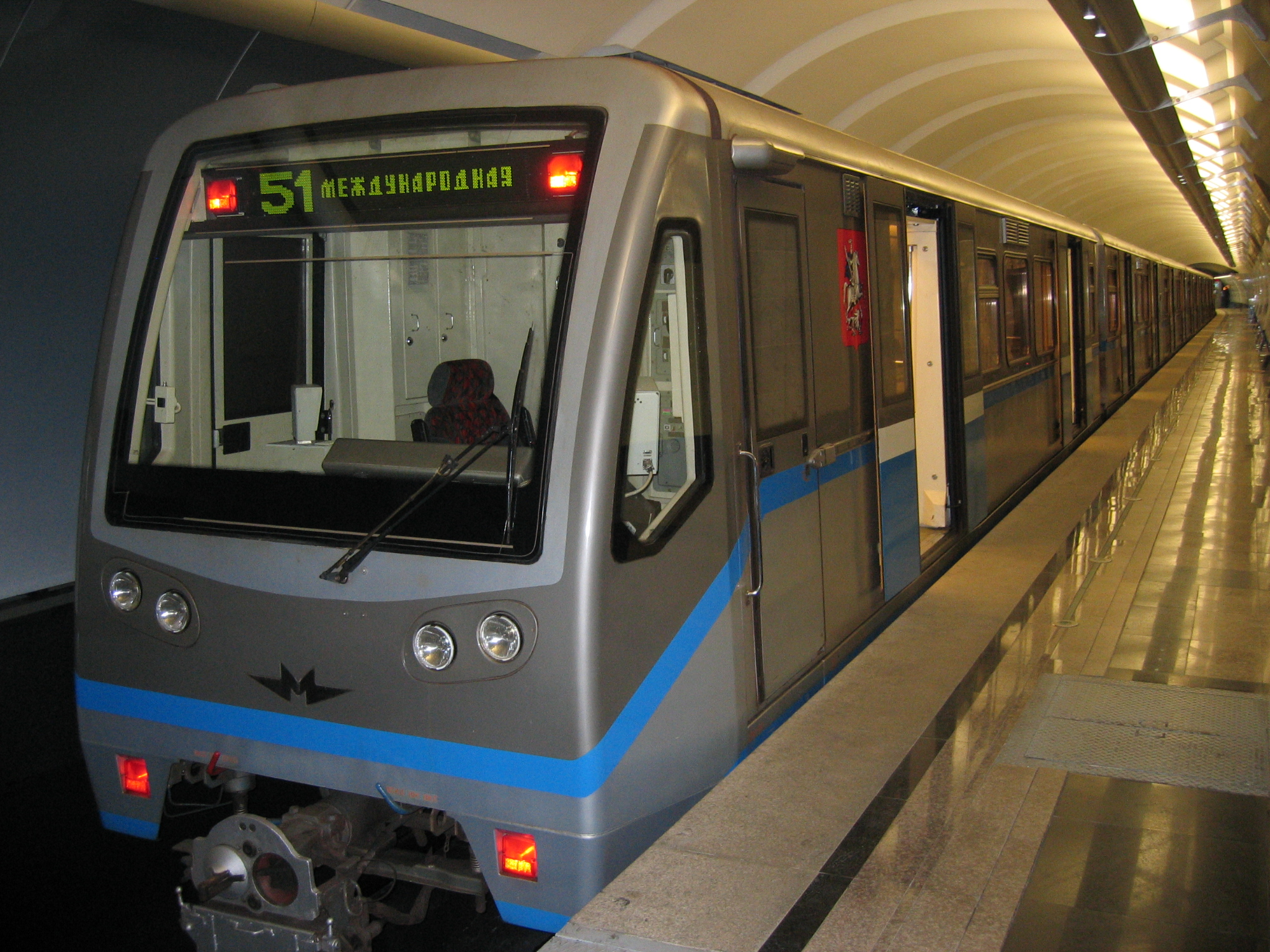
An 81-740/741 series train, similar to that involved in the accident

The derailment occurred 300 metres (980 ft) away from the Park Pobedy station outbound towards the Slavyansky Bulvar station, near the railroad switch to a then-unused track for the western section of the Kalininskaya Line. The switch was installed a few weeks before the accident, as part of a construction project initiated in 2013 that was working to extend the Kalininskaya Line to the western part of Solntsevo District. Surviving passengers who were unable to cross the debris were evacuated through several construction drifts leading to the surface shaft.

The derailment also caused a massive power outage on the line; another train, which was located in the tunnel at the time of the accident some 200 metres (660 ft) from Slavyansky Bulvar, was also stuck, and passengers had to be evacuated. There were no injuries reported on that train.

Early reports cited a power surge as the cause of the derailment, but this has not been confirmed and remains under investigation. Passengers on the train described cars striking one another, with most of the impact occurring at the front of the train. The first car, where all of the deaths reportedly occurred, had jackknifed in on itself, and the cars behind it piled up on each other. The final two cars remained on the tracks and were only slightly damaged.

== Victims ==
There were 24 killed in the accident (22 initially, two in hospital), and about 118 were hospitalized. Seventeen of the victims were Russian citizens, and the remaining victims included two citizens of Tajikistan, 2 citizens of China, and one person each from Ukraine, Moldova and Kyrgyzstan. About 42 people remained in "serious condition". Another 200 people were evacuated from the Metro; those with injuries were attended to outside the station. Initial reports stated that an additional 20 passengers remained underground, trapped in one of the cars. The train operator, a 29-year-old man, survived the crash, but was badly injured and had to undergo cranial surgery.

A witness reported to a news agency:

The train derailed right in front of our carriage. The carriage that was across the tracks had a small fire in it and was full of smoke. We took the fire extinguishers and started to extinguish the fire. We then broke down the door into the next tunnel and some of the people who were able to move started to walk from the next carriage towards Metro workers, who led them towards the tunnel, which led upstairs. It had an elevator, but it wasn't very big, so first of all we put the injured in the elevator.

— Passenger Andrey Zenin, a survivor of the derailment.

A spokesperson for the transport commission indicated that all passengers were "evacuated from the affected stations by midday". Terrorist threat was suspected, but quickly dismissed in this case. In the early morning of 17 July, personnel finished clearing away the debris and reported another casualty. In total, 17 corpses were removed from the debris, with the remainder of the victims succumbing to critical injuries within 24 hours of rescue. The tunnel was reportedly ready for repairs and night time maintenance as of 1:00 a.m. local time on 18 July and restored to full functionality around 6:00 am.

== Investigation ==
On 15 July 2014, the Investigative Committee of Russia opened a criminal investigation of the accident, according to part 3 of Article 263.1 of the Criminal Code (violation of the requirements of transport safety). Supervising examination of the accident site, investigators interviewed witnesses and employees. Vladimir Markin, the Committee's official representative, said that several causes for the accident were being considered, but that all were technical, there being no connection with terrorist attacks. He stated that certain people would be investigated and suspects would be identified.

On 16 July 2014, a senior track master and his assistant, who had worked on the installation of the new switch, were detained on a charge of negligence. According to investigators, they installed it incorrectly two months previously using a 3 mm (0.12 in) wire instead of special equipment to forcibly lock the switch, as it led to a yet incomplete tunnel. This wire could have failed and got the switch stuck in an intermediate position, derailing the train. Unprofessional operation of the train was said to have been another contributing factor, as the previous train that had passed over the switch three to four minutes before the accident had been traveling at a lower speed, and thus had not derailed.

On 22 July 2014, Ivan Besedin, chief executive of the Moscow Metro, was removed from office by Mayor Sergey Sobyanin. Besedin was replaced by the former chief executive of the high-speed railway branch of Russian Railways, Dmitry Pegov, to restore Muscovites' faith in the metro safety.

== Verdicts ==
The first trial on the matter ended and the verdicts were announced on 9 November 2015. Track master assistant Yuri Gordov was sentenced to 6 years of imprisonment, track repair deputy director Aleksei Trofimov, senior track master Valeri Bashkatov, and deputy director of the subcontractor company "Spetstekhrekonstruktsiya" Anatoli Kruglov each were sentenced to 5.5 years of imprisonment. There is a separate investigation involving six additional defendants that was still ongoing at the time of the conclusion of the first trial.
