= Mnyovniki =

Mnyovniki or Mnevniki (Russian: Мнёвники)

- Mnyovniki (village), abandoned village in Moscow Oblast
- Mnyovniki (Moscow Metro)
- Mnyovniki Street, Moscow

== See also ==
- Khoroshyovo-Mnyovniki District
