= Filyovsky Park =

Filyovsky Park may refer to:

- Filyovsky park District, a district in Western Administrative Okrug of Moscow, Russia
- Filyovsky Park (Moscow Metro), a station of the Moscow Metro, Moscow, Russia
