= Bagrationovsky =

Bagrationovsky (masculine), Bagrationovskaya (feminine), or Bagrationovskoye (neuter) may refer to:

- Bagrationovsky District, a district of Kaliningrad Oblast, Russia
- Bagrationovskoye Urban Settlement, a municipal formation which the town of district significance of Bagrationovsk in Bagrationovsky District of Kaliningrad Oblast, Russia is incorporated as
- Bagrationovskaya, a station of the Moscow Metro, Moscow, Russia
