= Daniel Sysoev =

Russian Orthodox priest (1974–2009)

- Даниил Сысоев
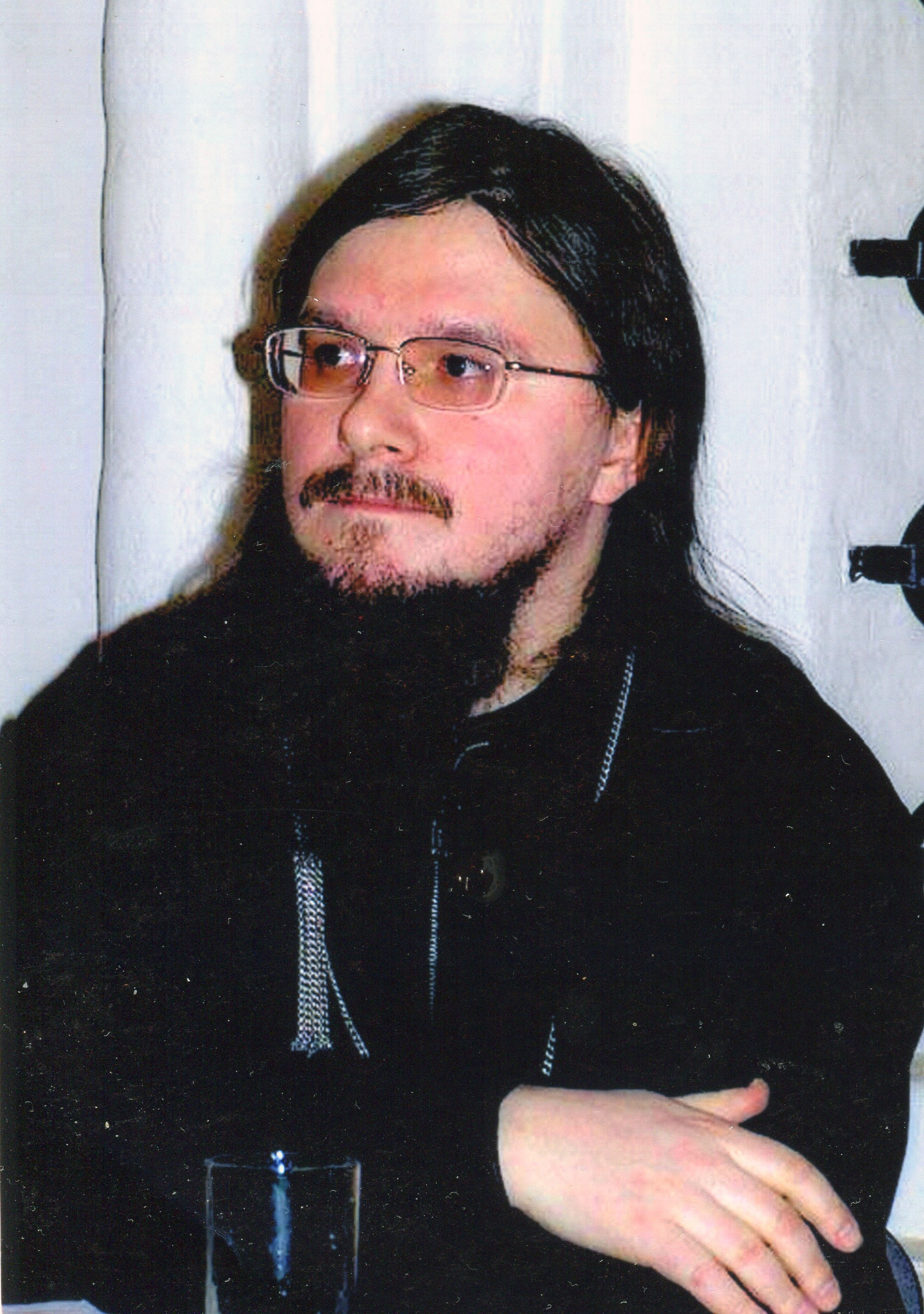

Personal life
- Born: 12 January 1974 Moscow, Russian SFSR, Soviet Union
- Died: 20 November 2009 (aged 35) Moscow, Russia
- Notable idea: Uranopolitism
- Education: Moscow Theological Seminary; Moscow Theological Academy (PhD)

Religious life
- Religion: Eastern Orthodoxy
- Church: Russian Orthodox Church

Daniel Alexeyevich Sysoev (Russian: Даниил Алексеевич Сысоев; 12 January 1974 – 20 November 2009) was a Russian Orthodox priest, rector of the Moscow Church of the Holy Apostle Thomas on Kantemirovskaya, and a prominent missionary.

Sysoev was known for his active missionary work, including among Russia's Muslims, neo-Pagans, and Protestants.

Sysoev was killed in his church in Moscow by a masked gunman on 19 November 2009. According to investigators, the killer was Beksultan Karybekov, born in 1987, a native of the city of Osh, Kyrgyzstan. Some Orthodox Christians revere Daniil Sysoyev as a martyr and expect his canonization in the future.

== Biography ==
Sysoev was born in 1974 into a family of Soviet dissidents. His father was Alexey Nikolayevich Sysoev, cleric of the Church of Peter and Paul in Yasenevo. His great-grandfather on his mother's side was a mullah.

He enrolled in the Moscow Theological Seminary in 1991. While studying there, according to the memoirs of Hieromonk Job (Gumerov), "[Sysoev] was imbued with a fervent conviction that only Orthodoxy contains the saving truth. Possessing excellent abilities, he already knew the church canons in his student years and heatedly argued with students and teachers when they allowed the slightest compromises." He graduated in 1995, and was soon after ordained as a deacon.

Sysoev later became a PhD student at the Moscow Theological Academy. In 2000, he completed his dissertation there, which was titled Anthropology and Analysis of the Seventh-Day Adventists and the Watchtower Society. In 2001, he began to work as a priest.

Sysoev's sermons were published in a series of books. Explaining the teaching of the Orthodox Church, Sysoev used the term 'Uranopolitism'.

In 2008, Sysoev took an active part in a missionary trip to Kyrgyzstan, in which he held several talks both in local Orthodox parishes and with local residents and performed several baptisms of local residents. Part of the missionary group made a trip to the Muslim region near the city of Osh.

== Murder ==
On 19 November 2009, Sysoev was fatally wounded in the Church of the Apostle Thomas by shots from a pistol. The shooter (non-Russian, as noted by eyewitnesses "by his characteristic accent"), who was wearing a medical mask, also shot twice at the choir director who greeted him at the exit and fled.

The funeral service on 23 November 2009 in the Church of Sts. Peter and Paul in Yasenevo was led by Archbishop Arseny (Epifanov) (237 priests and about a thousand laymen were present); after the funeral service, Patriarch Kirill of Moscow performed a requiem lity at the coffin of the deceased. In his farewell speech, the Patriarch said, in particular:

Father Daniel did much to establish God's truth […] But, perhaps, the most powerful word he uttered is the one we are witnessing today. If a person is killed for God's truth, it means that this truth strikes down people who do not accept it, and has enormous power.

Sysoev was buried on the territory of the Church of the Savior Not Made by Hands on Setun at the Diocesan Cemetery (part of the Kuntsevo Cemetery).

=== Investigation ===
Sysoev spoke about repeated death threats over his statements about Islam in the fall of 2009.

According to the main initial version of the criminal investigation, the murder was committed on religious grounds: Sysoev had previously been repeatedly threatened by representatives of an extremist group.

In December 2009, responsibility for the murder was claimed by a militant Islamic group based in the North Caucasus. According to a statement made by Russian Islamists and released on kavkazcenter.com:

One of our brothers who has never been to the Caucasus took up the oath of (former independent Chechen president Dokka Umarov) and expressed his desire to execute the damned Sysoyev.

An investment holding company announced a reward of 1 million rubles for help in catching the killer. Later, some information about the killer was provided by militants of the "Caucasian resistance", but the promised reward was never paid.

On 16 March 2010, Vladimir Markin, a representative of the Investigative Committee, stated that on 1 December 2009, law enforcement officers shot and killed Beksultan Karybekov, a native of Kyrgyzstan, who had offered armed resistance during an arrest in Makhachkala, and confiscated the pistol with which Sysoyev was killed in November 2009. On the same day, Vladimir Vigilyansky, the head of the Patriarchate's press service, stated: "We are, of course, satisfied that there is some clarity regarding this high-profile crime. However, I have some doubts about whether the murder of Father Daniel has been fully solved."

The next day, Kyrgyz journalists, citing Karybekov's mother, stated that the man killed on 1 December 2009 in Makhachkala might not have been Beksultan Karybekov.

== Public activity and views ==
Sysoev was known for his active missionary work among Muslim migrants in Moscow, conversion of Tatars and Chechens to Orthodoxy, discussions on creationism, disputes with Muslims, and multi-page polemics and articles on patriotism and "uranopolitism". Some media outlets described his assessments of Islam and Muslims as "radical". He was also criticized by Orthodox clergy for his harsh statements about Islam. In connection with these statements, Sysoyev repeatedly received threats against himself.

Sysoev spoke out on the topics of preaching Orthodoxy and performing missionary work among various groups, including skinheads, Old Believers, and Muslims. From August 1996, he held talks with people who have suffered from the activities of sects and occultists. He took a conservative position on yoga, karate, Latin dance, and belly dancing, calling on Christians not to attend such activities.

Sysoev had a negative attitude towards communism, considering it an infection, the root of whose evil was the feeling of envy. On July 17, 2007, he took part in a prayer service for the renaming of the Voykovskaya metro station, which took place in the Church of All Saints on Sokol, during which he called the liquidation of Lenin's Mausoleum and monuments to Bolshevik figures a necessary act of repentance.

Sysoev believed that education should only be church-based and that non-Christian education is destructive.

Sysoev was an opponent of abortion and personally took part in anti-abortion actions. At a picket on 1 June 2009, he said: "We are here to try to defend the rights of the most defenseless citizens of our country — children killed in the womb of their mothers. We advocate a complete and unconditional legislative ban on abortion. Doctors and medical institutions that practice infanticide must be subject to universal public censure."

Sysoev adhered to Uranopolitism which recognizes kinship in Christ as above blood or country of origin. He said that since in Christ Jesus "there is neither Greek nor Jew," nationalism, as a feeling of superiority of one's nationality over others, is a departure from true Christianity. However, he believed that only Christianity can ensure true national identity, saying: "So which of the religions ensures true national self-identity? Obviously, only Christianity, which does not destroy peoples, but indicates its place of love for the nation in the general chorus of the truly universal Faith."

== Legacy ==
Hieromonk Job Gumerov and many other leaders and clergy consider the murder of Sysoev to be martyrdom. Many Orthodox Christians hold him in high esteem, venerating him in iconography, liturgy, and prayer although he has not yet been formally canonized by an Orthodox synod.
