= Filyovsky Park (Moscow Metro) =

Moscow Metro station

Filyovsky Park Филёвский парк
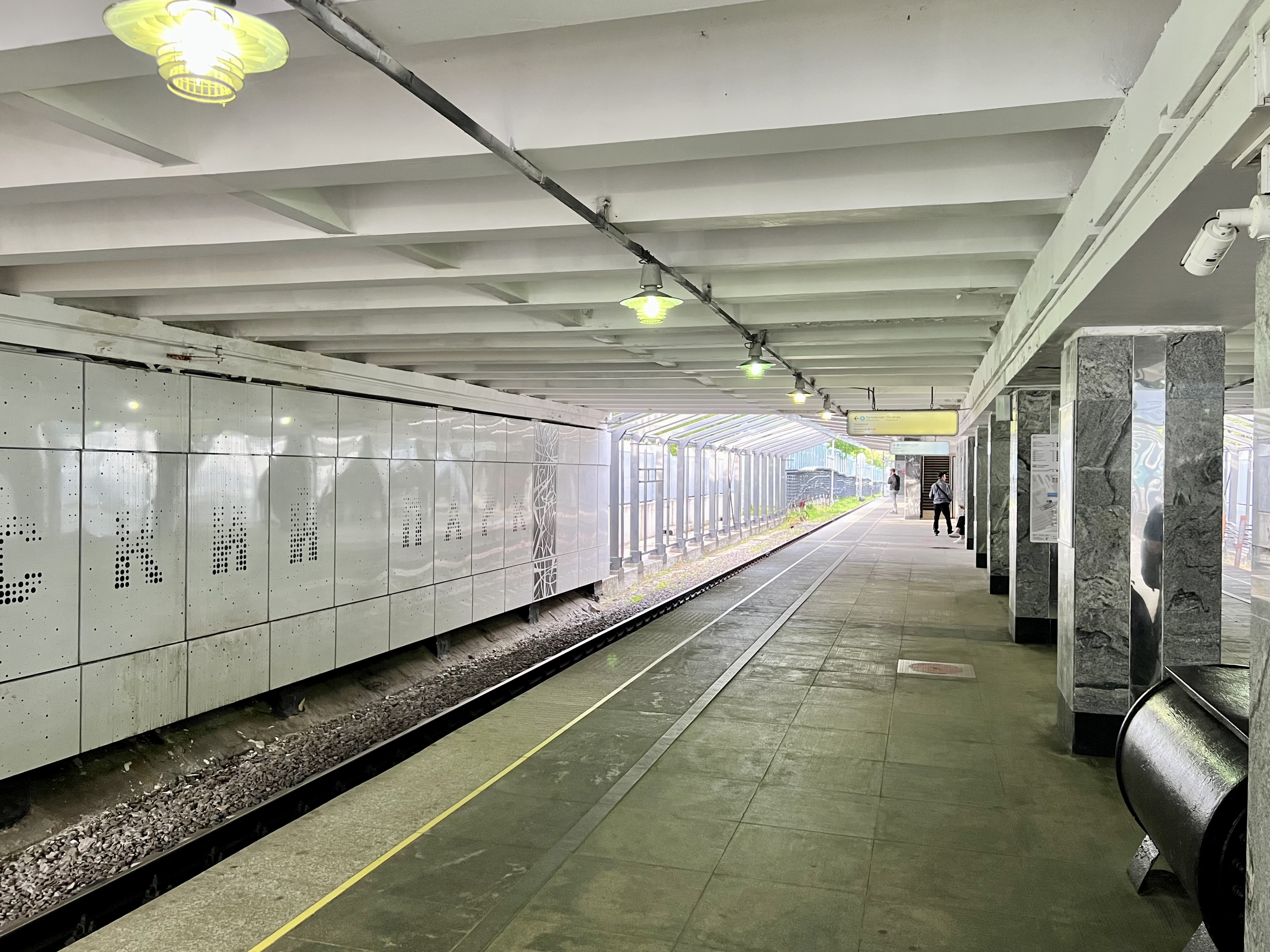

General information
- Location: Filyovsky Park District; Fili-Davydkovo District; Western Administrative Okrug; Moscow; Russia
- Coordinates: 55.7396°N 37.4833°E
- System: Moscow Metro station
- Owner: Moskovsky Metropoliten
- Line: Filyovskaya line
- Platforms: 1 island platform
- Tracks: 2

Construction
- Structure type: Ground-level, open
- Platform levels: 1
- Parking: No

Other information
- Station code: 062

History
- Opened: 13 October 1961; 64 years ago

Services
Preceding station	Moscow Metro	Following station
Pionerskaya towards Kuntsevskaya	Filyovskaya line	Bagrationovskaya towards Aleksandrovsky Sad
Route map
Location
- Location within Moscow Metro

Filyovsky Park (Russian: Филёвский парк) is a station on the Filyovskaya Line of the Moscow Metro. It opened in 1961 as part of the western extension of the Filyovsky radius.

== Building ==
The station sits in a shallow cut, with the lower-level platform beneath (and perpendicular to) Minskaya street, which crosses it on an overpass. Two entrance vestibules (one opened in 2005 after a renovation) are on the upper level, providing access to the street. Most of the wall surfaces on the platform are faced with gray marble, though the overall appearance is spartan. The station was designed by Robert Pogrebnoi and Cheremin. Filyovsky Park is the most badly deteriorated of the surface stations and as a result is undergoing extensive renovations to repair four decades of damage caused by harsh weather, vibrations, and neglect.
