= Bagrationovskaya =

Moscow Metro station

Bagrationovskaya Багратионовская
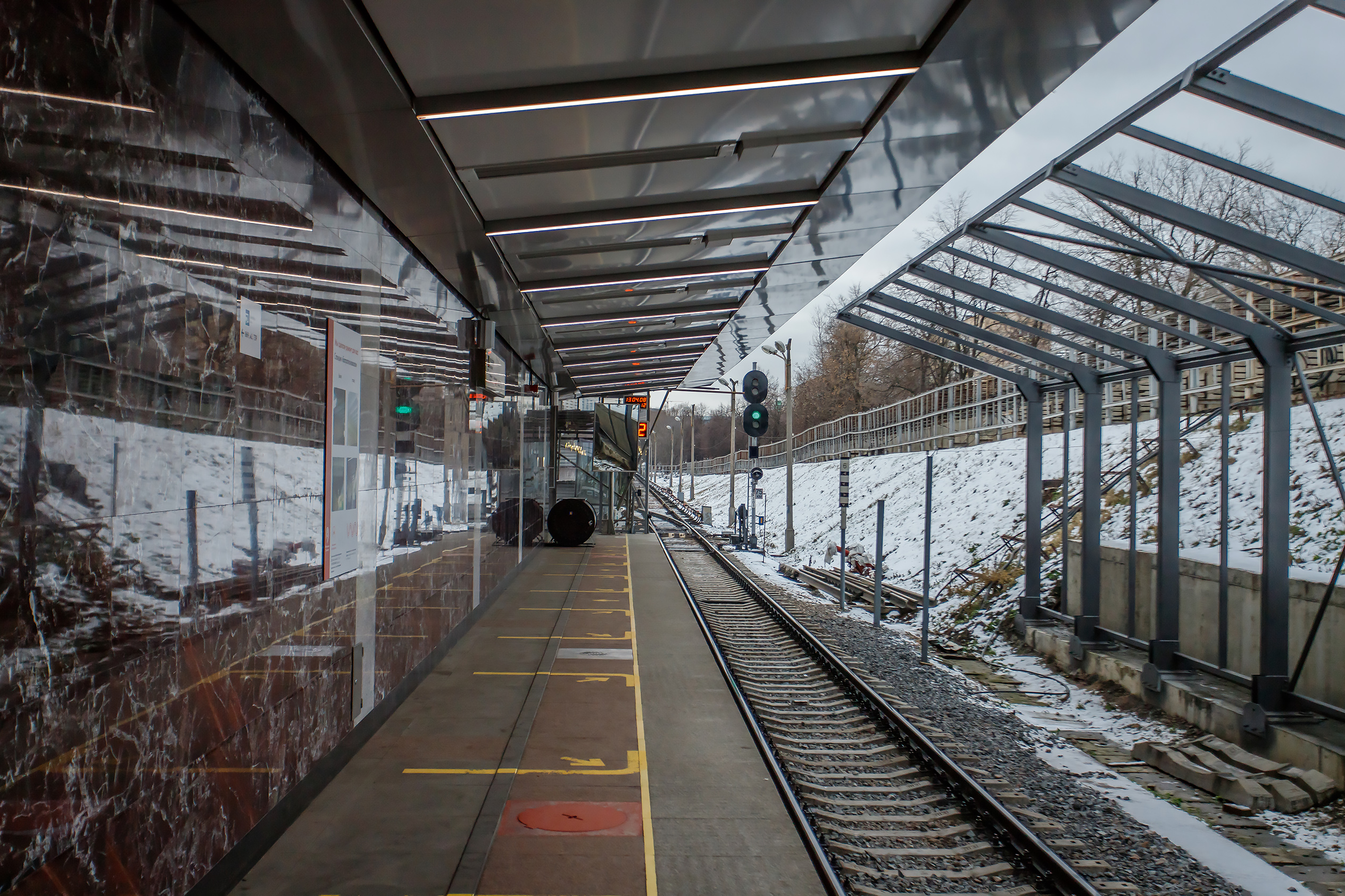

General information
- Location: Filyovsky Park District; Western Administrative Okrug; Moscow; Russia
- Coordinates: 55.7438°N 37.4977°E
- System: Moscow Metro station
- Owner: Moskovsky Metropoliten
- Line: Filyovskaya line
- Platforms: 1 island platform
- Tracks: 2

Construction
- Structure type: Ground-level, open
- Platform levels: 1
- Parking: No

Other information
- Station code: 061

History
- Opened: 13 October 1961; 64 years ago

Services
Preceding station	Moscow Metro	Following station
Filyovsky Park towards Kuntsevskaya	Filyovskaya line	Fili towards Aleksandrovsky Sad
Route map
Location
- Location within Moscow Metro

Bagrationovskaya (Russian: Багратионовская) is a Moscow Metro station, located on the surface portion of the Filyovskaya Line. Designed by Rimidalv Pogrebnoy and Cheremin and opened in 1961 as part of the western extension of the Filyovsky radius, the station unlike the other three coming from the centre, features a more functional design innovation.

== Name ==
It is named after Prince and General Pyotr Bagration.

== Building ==
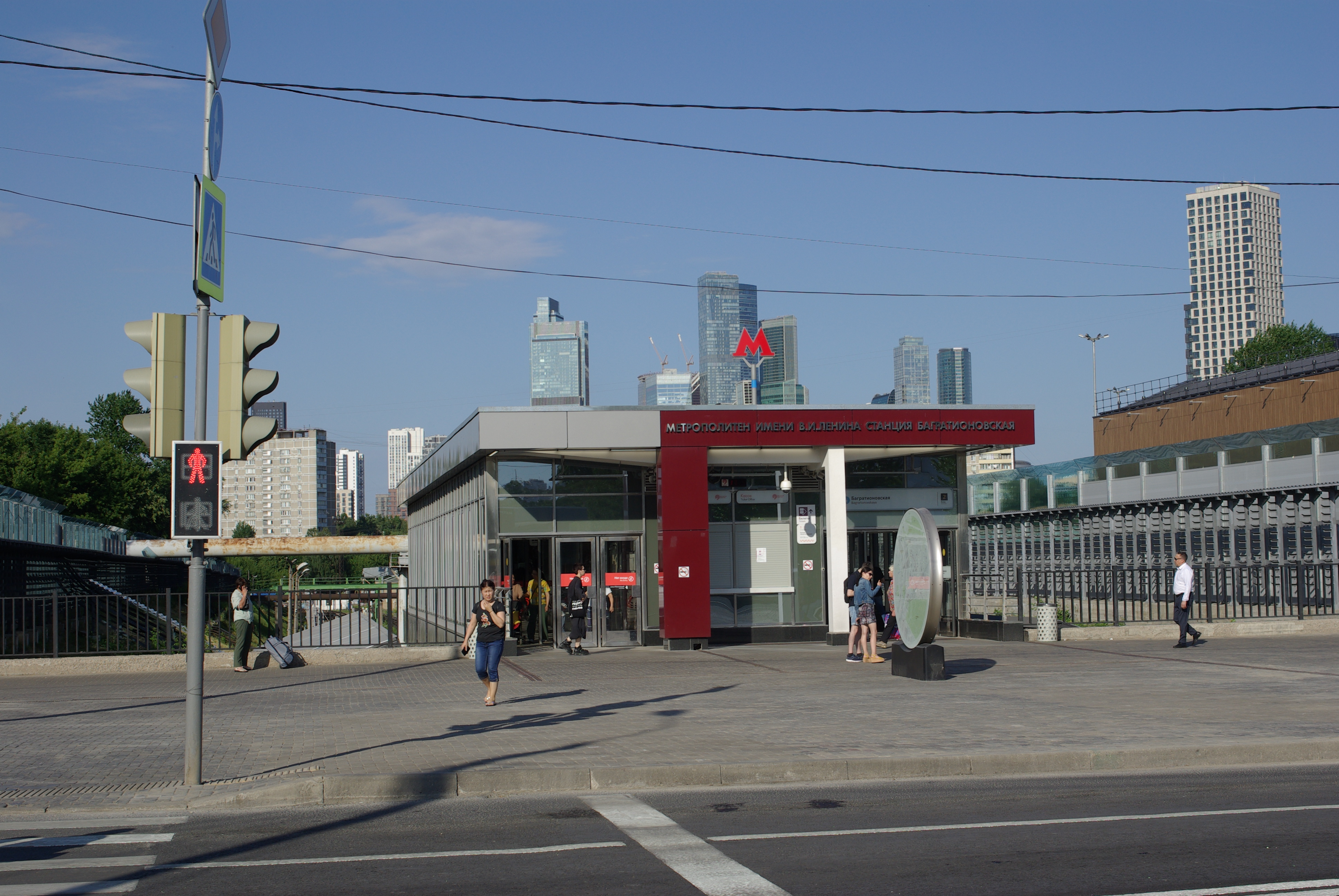
East vestibule of Bagrationovskaya (2022)

The station is located at the Metro line's intersection with Barklaya Street, which crosses the platform on an overpass. Entrance vestibules are located on the upper level, above the platform. Canopies (supported by white marble pillars) and the road overpass provide some shelter to waiting passengers, but constant exposure to the elements has left the station in a state of disrepair. A project that involves renovating and enclosing the station is currently under way.

== Traffic ==
Today the station is one of the busiest, due to the proximity of the Gorbushka shopping centre.

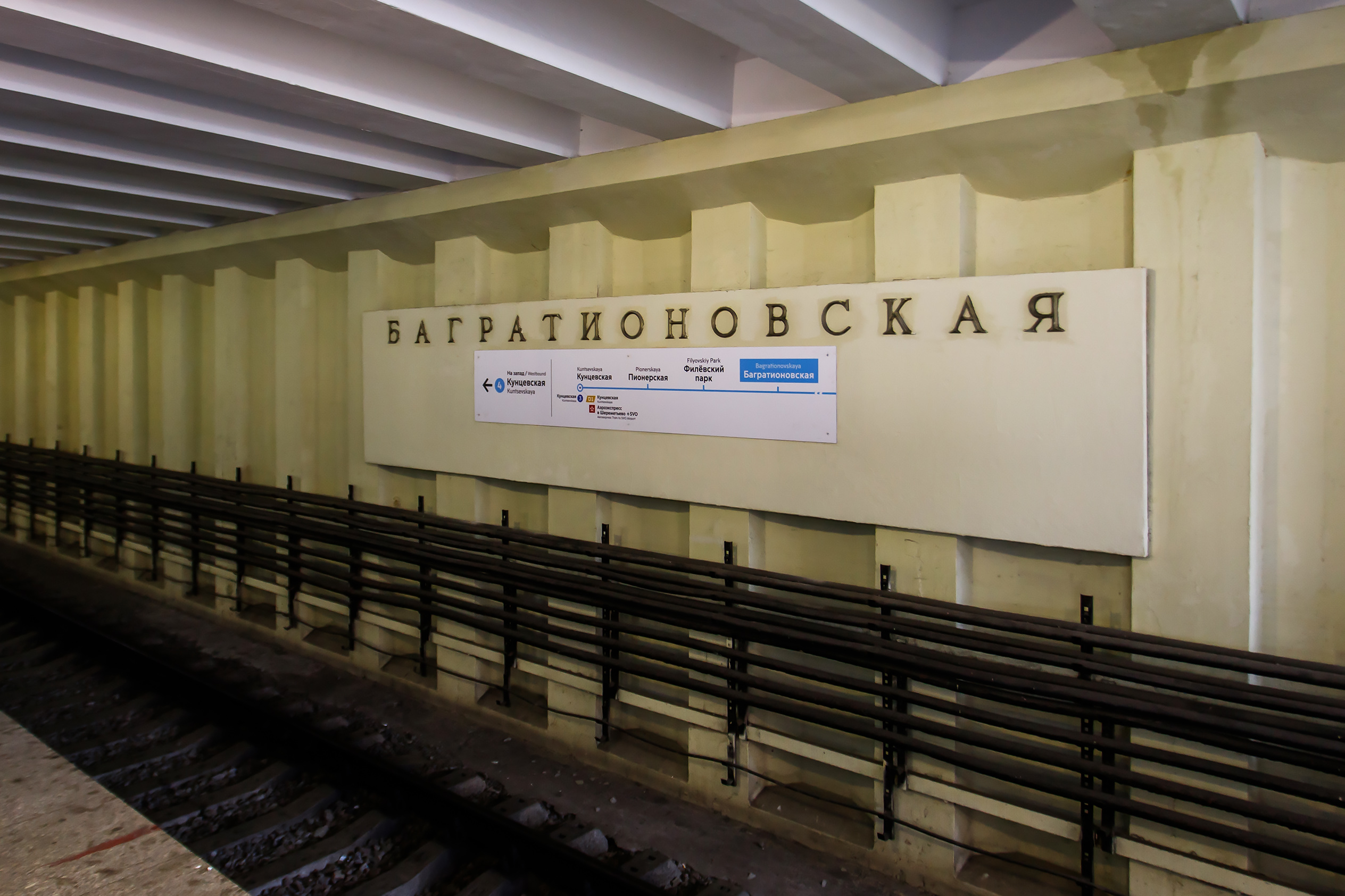
Station wall under the overpass.
