= Caesaropapism =

System with state control of the Church

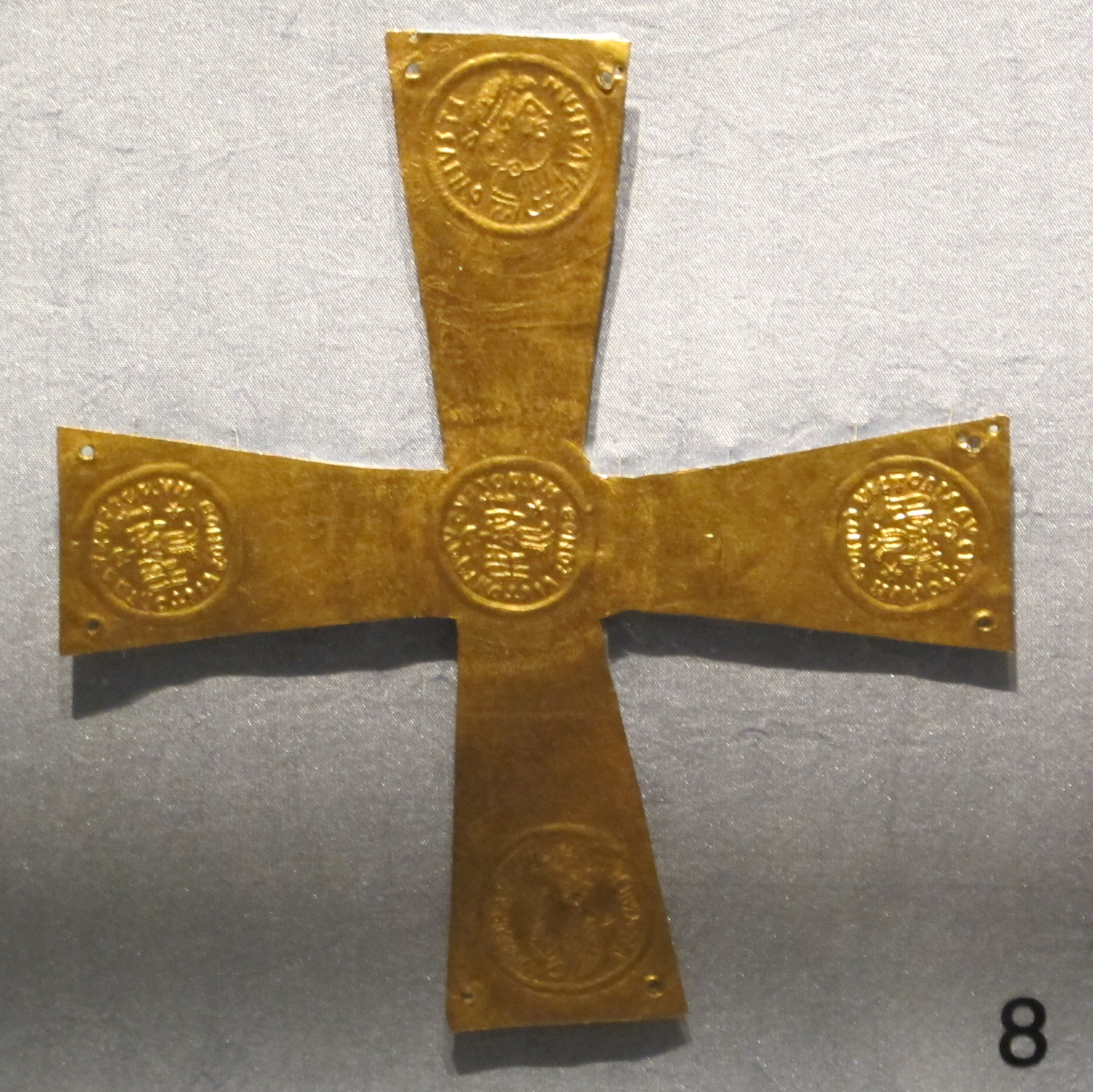
A small cross of gold sheet, with rubbings of coins of Justin II (emperor in 565–574) and holes for nails or thread, Italian, 6th century

Caesaropapism /ˌsiːzəroʊˈpeɪpɪzəm/ is the idea of blending the social and political power of secular government with religious power, or of making secular authority superior to the spiritual authority of the Church, especially concerning the connection of the Church with government. Although Justus Henning Böhmer (1674–1749) may have originally coined the term caesaropapism (Cäsaropapismus), it was Max Weber (1864–1920) who wrote that "a secular, caesaropapist ruler ... exercises supreme authority in ecclesiastic matters by virtue of his autonomous legitimacy." According to Weber, caesaropapism entails "the complete subordination of priests to secular power."

In an extreme form, caesaropapism is where the head of state is also the supreme head of the church (pope or analogous religious leader). Both caesaropapism and theocracy are systems in which there is no separation of church and state and in which the two form parts of a single power-structure.

== Eastern Church ==
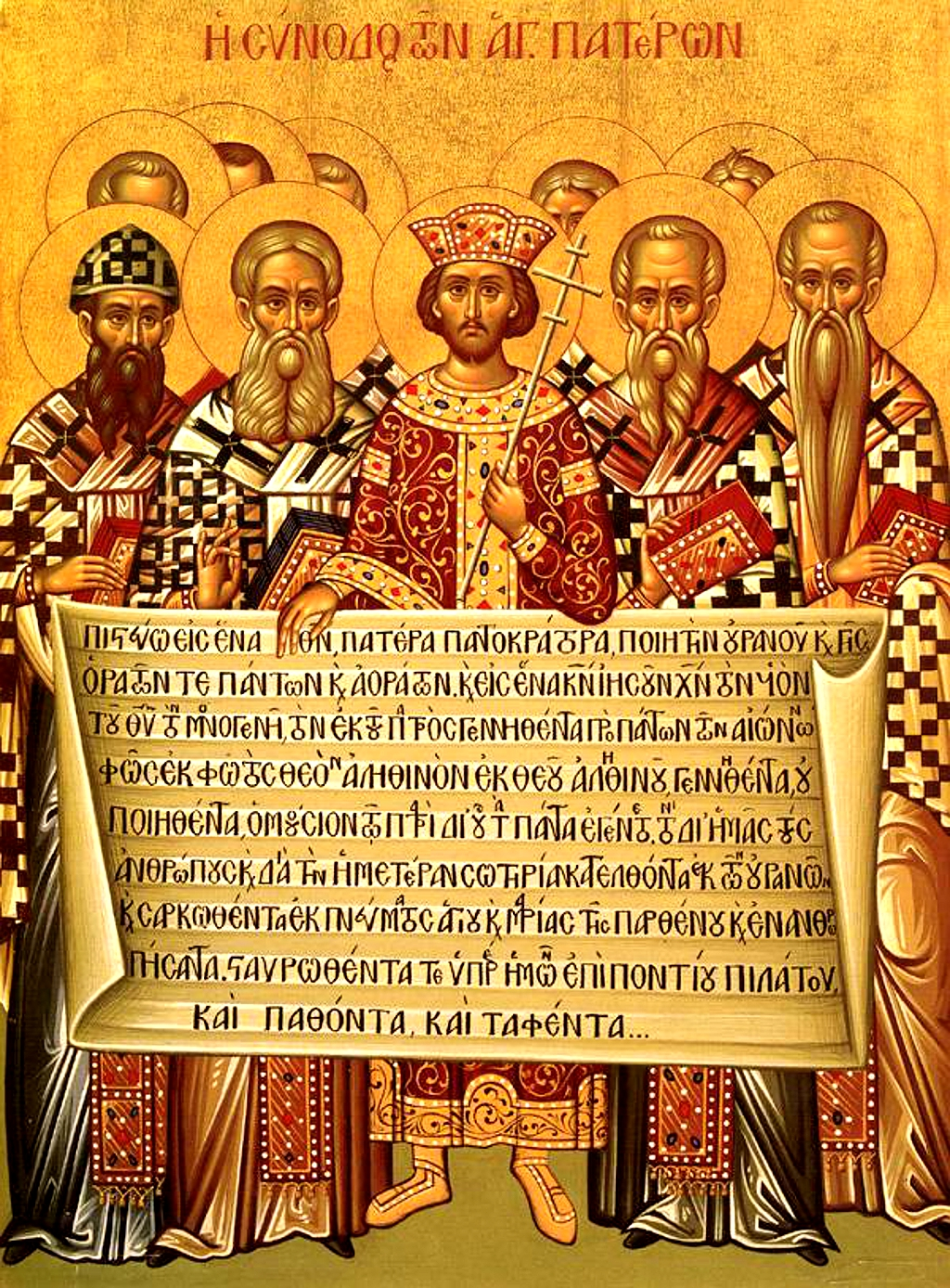
Icon depicting the Roman Emperor Constantine the Great (centre) and the bishops of the First Council of Nicaea (325) holding the Niceno–Constantinopolitan Creed of 381.

Caesaropapism's chief example is the authority that the Byzantine (East Roman) emperors had over the Church of Constantinople and Eastern Christianity from the 330 consecration of Constantinople through the tenth century. The Byzantine emperor would typically protect the Eastern Church and manage its administration by presiding over ecumenical councils and appointing Patriarchs and setting territorial boundaries for their jurisdiction. The emperor exercised a strong control over the ecclesiastical hierarchy, and the Patriarch of Constantinople could not hold office if he did not have the emperor's approval. Such emperors as Basiliscus, Zeno, Justinian I, Heraclius, and Constans II published several strictly ecclesiastical edicts either on their own without the mediation of church councils, or they exercised their own political influence on the councils to issue the edicts. According to Metropolitan Kallistos Ware, the historical reality of caesaropapism stems from the confusion of the Byzantine Empire with the Kingdom of God and the zeal of the Byzantines "to establish here on earth a living icon of God's government in heaven."

However, Caesaropapism "never became an accepted principle in Byzantium." Several Eastern churchmen such as John Chrysostom, Patriarch of Constantinople and Athanasius, Patriarch of Alexandria, strongly opposed imperial control over the Church, as did Western theologians like Hilary of Poitiers and Hosius, Bishop of Córdoba. Saints, such as Maximus the Confessor, resisted the imperial power as a consequence of their witness to orthodoxy. In addition, at several occasions imperial decrees had to be withdrawn as the people of the Church, both lay people, monks and priests, refused to accept inventions at variance with the Church's customs and beliefs. These events show that power over the Church really was in the hands of the Church itself – not solely with the emperor.

During a speech at the St. Procopius Unionistic Congress in 1959, John Dvornik stated, "...the attitude of all Orthodox Churches toward the State, especially the Russian Church is dictated by a very old tradition which has its roots in early Christian political philosophy... the Christian Emperor was regarded as the representative of God in the Christian commonwealth, whose duty was to watch not only over the material, but also the spiritual welfare of his Christian subjects. Because of that, his interference in Church affairs was regarded as his duty." The regional church was elevated by the rivals of the Byzantine Empire, namely the Serbian and Bulgarian empires, to patriarchate according to a prevailing theory during the time the status of the church had to be equal to the state.

Following the Fall of Constantinople in 1453, the sultans of the Ottoman Empire took control of appointing the Patriarch of Constantinople and all Byzantine Rite Bishops within their dominions. According to historian Charles A. Frazee, the Greek Hierarchs appointed by the sultan and his advisors were almost invariably opposed to the reunification decrees at the Council of Florence and rejected the authority of the Papacy.

At the same time, however, the subordination of the Church to the Sublime Porte attracted criticism during subsequent periods such as in the February 14, 1908 Papal allocution Ringraziamo Vivamente, where Pope Pius X accused the Greek Orthodox Church under Turkish rule of having preferred, "a harsh yoke (that of Islam) to the tenderness of their mother."

Caesaropapism was most notorious in the Tsardom of Russia when Ivan the Terrible assumed the title Tsar in 1547 and subordinated the Russian Orthodox Church to the state. In defiance of the Tsar's absolute power, Philip, the Metropolitan of Moscow, preached sermons in Tsar Ivan's presence that condemned his indiscriminate use of state terror against real and imagined traitors and their families by the Oprichnina. Metropolitan Philip also withheld the traditional blessing of the Tsar during the Divine Liturgy. In response, the Tsar convened a Church Council, whose bishops obediently declared Metropolitan Philip deposed on false charges of moral offenses and imprisoned him in a monastery. When the former Metropolitan refused a request from the Tsar to bless the 1570 Massacre of Novgorod, the Tsar allegedly sent Malyuta Skuratov to smother the former Bishop inside his cell. Metropolitan Philip was canonized in 1636 and is still commemorated within the Orthodox Church as a, "pillar of orthodoxy, fighter for the truth, shepherd who laid down his life for his flock."

Tsar Ivan's level of caesaropapism far exceeded that of the Byzantine Empire but was taken to a new level in 1721, when Peter the Great and Theophan Prokopovich, as part of their Church reforms, replaced the Patriarch of Moscow with a department of the civil service headed by an Ober-Procurator and called the Most Holy Synod, which oversaw the running of the church as an extension of the Tsar's government.

The Patriarchate was only restored on November 10 (October 28 O.S.), 1917, 3 days after the Bolshevik Revolution, by decision of the All-Russian Local Council. On 5 November 1917, after his election by vote as one of the three candidates for the restored Patriarchate of Moscow, Metropolitan Vladimir of Kiev announced that Metropolitan Tikhon had been selected for the position after a drawing of lots as the new Patriarch of Moscow and All Russia.

Seeking to convince Soviet authorities to stop the campaign of terror and persecution against the Church, Metropolitan Sergius, acting as patriarchal locum tenens, tried to look for ways of peaceful reconciliation with the government. On July 29, 1927, he issued his famous declaration: an encyclical letter where he professed the absolute loyalty of the Russian Orthodox Church to the Soviet Union and to its government's interests.

The declaration sparked an immediate controversy among the Russian Eastern Orthodox, many of whom (including many notable and respected bishops in prisons and exile) broke communion with Sergius. This attitude of submission to the Soviet Government is sometimes derogatorily called "Sergianism", after Metropolitan Sergius and his declaration, and is to this day deemed by some Eastern Orthodox Christians, especially True Orthodox, as a heresy.

Later, some of these bishops reconciled with Sergius, but many still remained in opposition to the "official Church" until the election of Patriarch Alexius I in 1945.

== Western Church ==
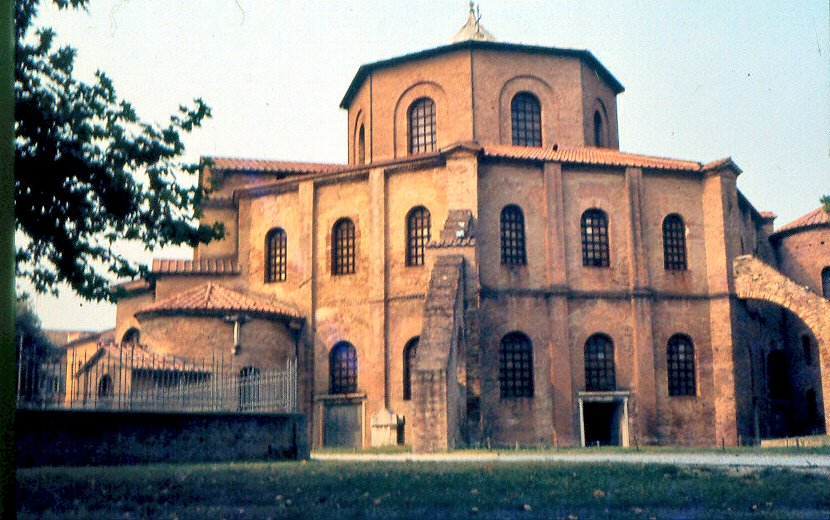
The Basilica of San Vitale in Ravenna, Italy combines Western and Byzantine elements.

Justinian I conquered the Italian peninsula in the Gothic War (535–554) and appointed the next three popes, a practice that would be continued by his successors and would later be delegated to the Exarchate of Ravenna. The Byzantine Papacy was a period of Byzantine domination of the papacy from 537 to 752, when popes required the approval of the Byzantine Emperor for episcopal consecration, and many popes were chosen from the apocrisiarii (diplomatic envoys from the pope to the emperor) or from the inhabitants of Byzantine Greece, Byzantine Syria, or Byzantine Sicily.

In the Latin West, medieval secular rulers vied with the papacy for overall power, notably in the Investiture Controversy of the 11th and 12th centuries and in the struggles between Guelphs and Ghibellines from the 12th to the 14th centuries, but neither the German Kings nor the Holy Roman Emperors ever succeeded in establishing any long-term dominance over the Vatican. Emperors could at times exert influence over the election of Bishops of Rome, they could claim the right (Latin: jus exclusivae) to veto a papal candidate (last exercised in 1903 by His Imperial and Royal Apostolic Majesty The Emperor of Austria, Apostolic King of Hungary), or they could support rival antipopes. "Conquering kings" (the Theophylacti between the 10th and 12th centuries, Napoleon in 1809, Victor Emmanuel II in 1870, for example) could curb a Pope's political rule, but they could not reliably control the Holy Father, and the papacy generally asserted and maintained its spiritual independence from secular control. In protestant regions in the Holy Roman Empire, the princes acted as the summus episcopus under the sovereign church regiment which remained in control until the introduction of the Weimar Constitution in 1919.

=== Anglican Communion ===
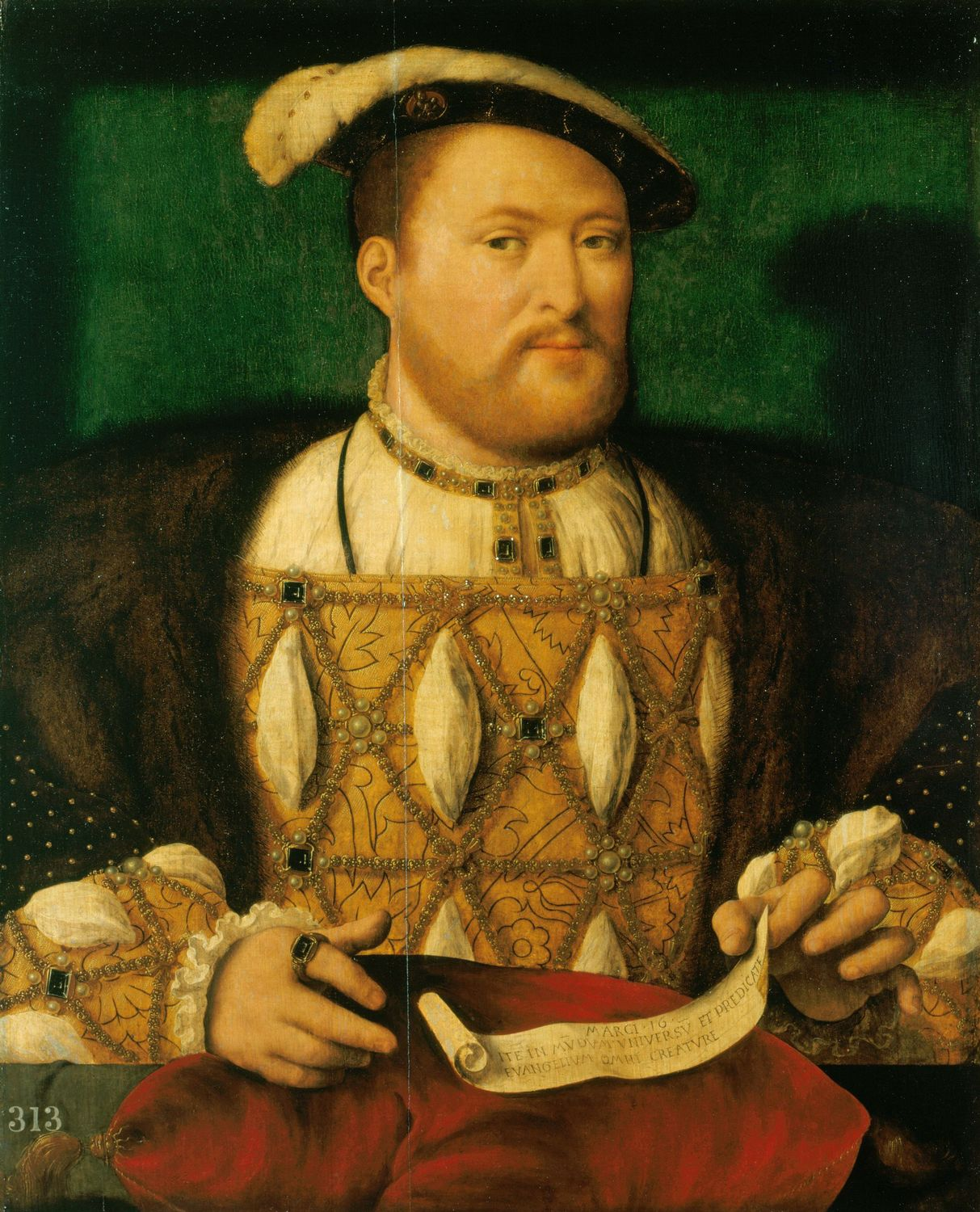
Henry VIII (c. 1531)

During the dispute between King Henry VIII and Pope Clement VII over Henry's wish to have his marriage to Catherine of Aragon annulled, the English Parliament passed the Act in Restraint of Appeals (1533). It stated:

Where by divers sundry old authentic histories and chronicles it is manifestly declared and expressed that this realm of England is an empire, and so hath been accepted in the world, governed by one supreme head and king, having the dignity and royal estate of the imperial crown of the same.

The next year Parliament passed the First Act of Supremacy (1534) that explicitly tied the head of church to the imperial crown of England:

The only supreme head in earth of the Church of England called Anglicana Ecclesia, and shall have and enjoy annexed and united to the imperial crown of this realm.

The Crown of Ireland Act, passed by the Irish Parliament in 1541 (effective 1542), changed the traditional title used by the Monarchs of England for the reign over Ireland, from Lord of Ireland to King of Ireland and named Henry head of the Church of Ireland, for similar reasons.

During the rule of Queen Mary I (r. 1553–1558), the First Act of Supremacy was annulled, but during the reign of Queen Elizabeth I the Second Act of Supremacy, with similar wording to the First Act, was passed in 1559. During the English Interregnum of 1649 to 1660 the laws were annulled, but the acts which caused the laws to be in abeyance were themselves deemed null and void by the Parliaments of the English Restoration from 1660 onwards.

When Elizabeth I restored royal supremacy, she replaced the title "Supreme Head" with that of "Supreme Governor", a conciliatory change designed to mollify English Catholics and the more radical of the English Protestants.

According to Nicholas Sanders (c. 1530 - 1581), however:

"The Queen lays down for her clergy a rule of life, outside of which they dare not move, not only in those things which Protestants call indifferent, but in all matters of Faith, discipline, and doctrine, in virtue of that supreme spiritual power with which she is invested: she suspends her bishops when she pleases, she grants a license to preach, either to those who are ordained according to her rite or to simple laymen, in the same way at her pleasure reduces those whom she will to silence. To show her authority in these things, she occasionally, from her closet, addresses her preacher, and interrupts him in the presence of a large congregation, in some such way as this: 'Mr. Doctor, you are wandering from the text, and talking nonsense. Return to your subject.'"

Since 1559, the royal monarchs of England, of Great Britain, and of the United Kingdom have claimed the "Supreme Governor" status as well as the title of "Defender of the Faith" (which was originally bestowed on Henry VIII by Pope Leo X but later revoked by Pope Paul III, as that was originally an award for Henry VIII's 1521 anti-Lutheran treatise Defence of the Seven Sacraments).

Despite his continued persecution of both Catholic Recusants and English Dissenters, King James I (r. 1603–1625) preferred not to do anything else that might otherwise encourage factional strife within the Anglican Communion. His son and heir, King Charles I (r. 1625–1649), through his insistence upon promoting the High-Church reforms advocated by the Caroline Divines and by Archbishop William Laud, alienated opponents of Anglo-Catholicism and lost his throne in the course of the English Civil War of 1642-1651.

The 1688 overthrow of the House of Stuart was caused by the efforts of King James II (r. 1685–1688) to partially annul the Act of Supremacy by granting Catholic Emancipation more than two hundred years before Daniel O'Connell. As many Anglicans saw James's attempts as in violation of the King's Coronation Oath, Parliament blocked every bill, which caused the King to simply order Catholic Emancipation into effect using his Royal Prerogative. In response, Parliament successfully invited the King's son-in-law, William of Orange to invade England and to take the throne.

Even though King James II and his exiled heirs remained Catholics, their overthrow divided the Anglican Communion in what is now known as the Non-juring schism. Anglican Jacobites, or Non-Jurors, embraced the Anglo-Catholicism advanced by the Stuart monarchs between 1603 and 1688. During each of the Jacobite risings, Non-Juring Anglican chaplains accompanied the Jacobite armies. The schism faded following the 1788 death of Prince Charles Edward Stuart and the inheritance of his claim to the throne by his younger brother, Prince Henry Benedict Stuart, a Catholic priest and Cardinal.

== See also ==
- Christianity and politics
- Constantinianism
- Church and state in medieval Europe
- Dictatus papae
- Dominium mundi
- Gallicanism
- Imperial church system
- Islamic state
- Papal deposing power
- Papal supremacy
- Ultramontanism
- Uranopolitism
