= Davydkovo (Moscow Metro) =

Moscow Metro station

Davydkovo Давыдково
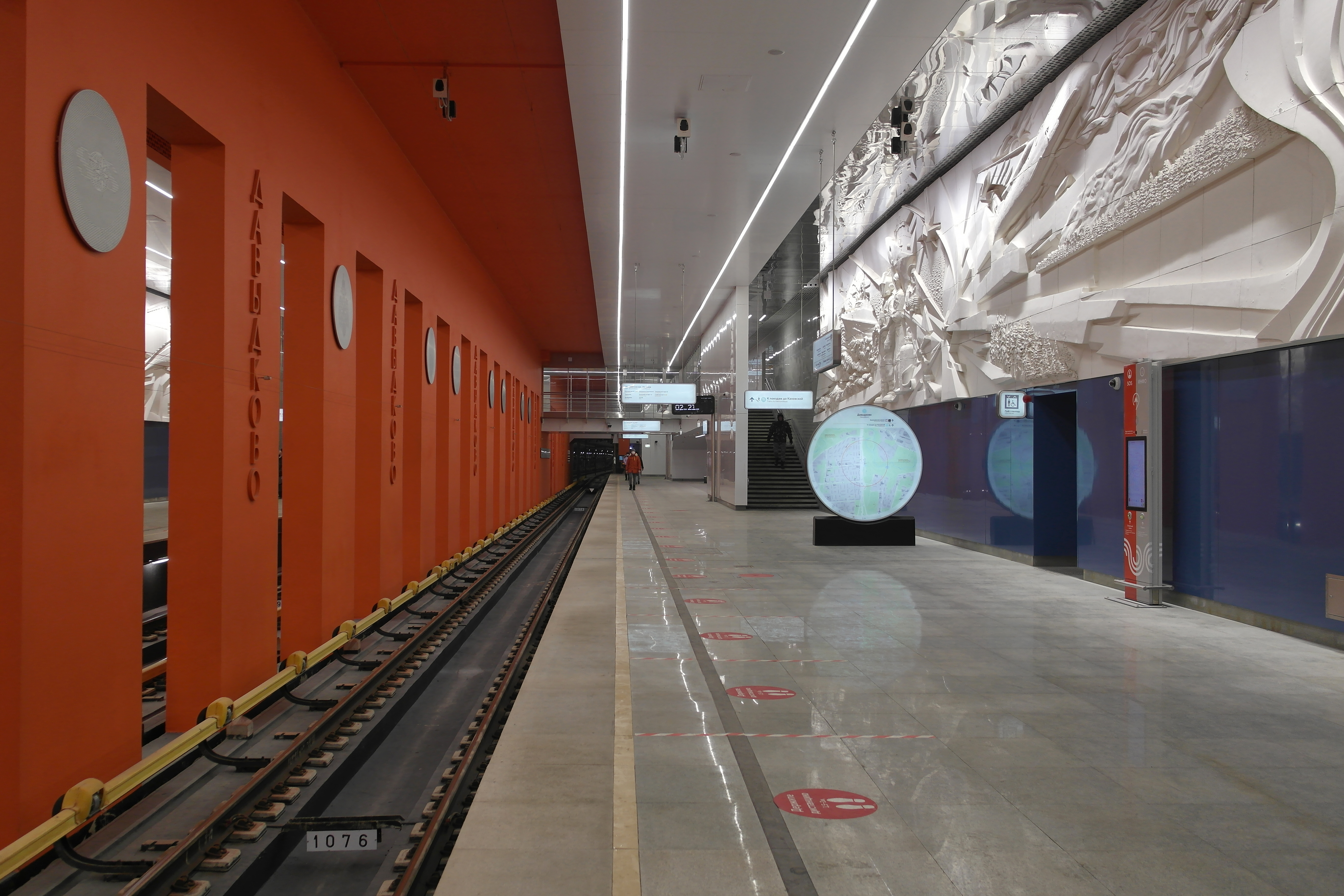

General information
- Location: Fili-Davydkovo and Mozhaysky Districts, Western Administrative Okrug; Moscow; Russia
- Coordinates: 55.7153°N 37.4517°E
- System: Moscow Metro station
- Owner: Moskovsky Metropoliten
- Line: Bolshaya Koltsevaya line
- Platforms: 2 side platforms
- Tracks: 2
- Connections: Bus: 11, 77, 104, 236, 622, 688, 732, 733

Construction
- Structure type: Shallow column station
- Depth: 33 metres (108 ft)
- Platform levels: 1

History
- Opened: 7 December 2021; 4 years ago

Services
Preceding station	Moscow Metro	Following station
Aminyevskaya anticlockwise / outer	Bolshaya Koltsevaya line	Kuntsevskaya clockwise / inner
Route map
Bolshaya Koltsevaya line
Location
- Location within Moscow Metro

Davydkovo (Russian: Давыдково) is a station on the Bolshaya Koltsevaya line of the Moscow Metro. It was opened on 7 December 2021 as part of the section between Mnyovniki and Kakhovskaya.
