= Uranopolitism =

Christian doctrine formulated by Daniel Sysoev (1974–2009)

Uranopolitism (Russian: Уранополитизм, romanized: Uranopolitizm; Greek: Ουρανοπολιτισμός, romanized: Ouranopolitismos, lit. 'Heavenly city-ism') is a Patristic Christian doctrine formulated by Daniel Sysoev (1974–2009), a Russian Orthodox priest, missionary and theologian from Moscow who was murdered whilst hearing a confession. He preached the doctrine throughout his ministry, particularly during the 2000's and his online ministry.

It is the belief that faith in Christ is the ultimate union that people can have between each other, prevailing above union in family, nationality, and ethnicity, as well as that the Law of God is superior to that of human law. It primarily emphasises having 'heavenly citizenship' (cf. Philippians 3:20 and Ephesians 2:19) over having earthly citizenship. It de-emphasises patriotism along with Christian nationalism.

== Description ==
Sysoev defined it in the following way:

Uranopolitism [...] is the doctrine asserting the supremacy of divine laws over earthly ones, the primacy of love for the Heavenly Father and His Kingdom over all natural and sinful human desires. Uranopolitism teaches that the highest kinship is not that of blood or national origin, but kinship in Christ. It holds that Christians have no eternal citizenship here on earth but seek the coming Kingdom of God, and therefore cannot give their hearts to anything earthly. In this mortal world, Christians are but wanderers and strangers, and their true homeland is in Heaven.

== Controversy ==
On 11 February 2025, a video leaked online, recorded during an annual meeting of the clergy of the Eparchy of Moscow, showed Alexei Shliapin, a parish priest serving in Mozhaysk and an ardent follower of Daniel Sysoev's theology, verbally challenging Patriarch Kirill of Moscow, who was chairing the meeting. Shliapin said to him, 'A priest should lead people to the Kingdom of Heaven, not engage in patriotism.' To which the Patriarch remarked, 'How wonderful. This is the first time I’ve heard such a thing. Father, are you by any chance from Western Ukraine? Go sit down and seriously reflect on what you just blurted out.' Shliapin's confrontation was seen as espousing Uranopolitanism, albeit 'not [...] well-phrased'.

== See also ==
- Caesaropapism
- Ethnophyletism
- Galatians 3:28
- The City of God, a book by Saint Augustine of Hippo
