= Pionerskaya (Moscow Metro) =

Moscow Metro station

Pionerskaya Пионерская
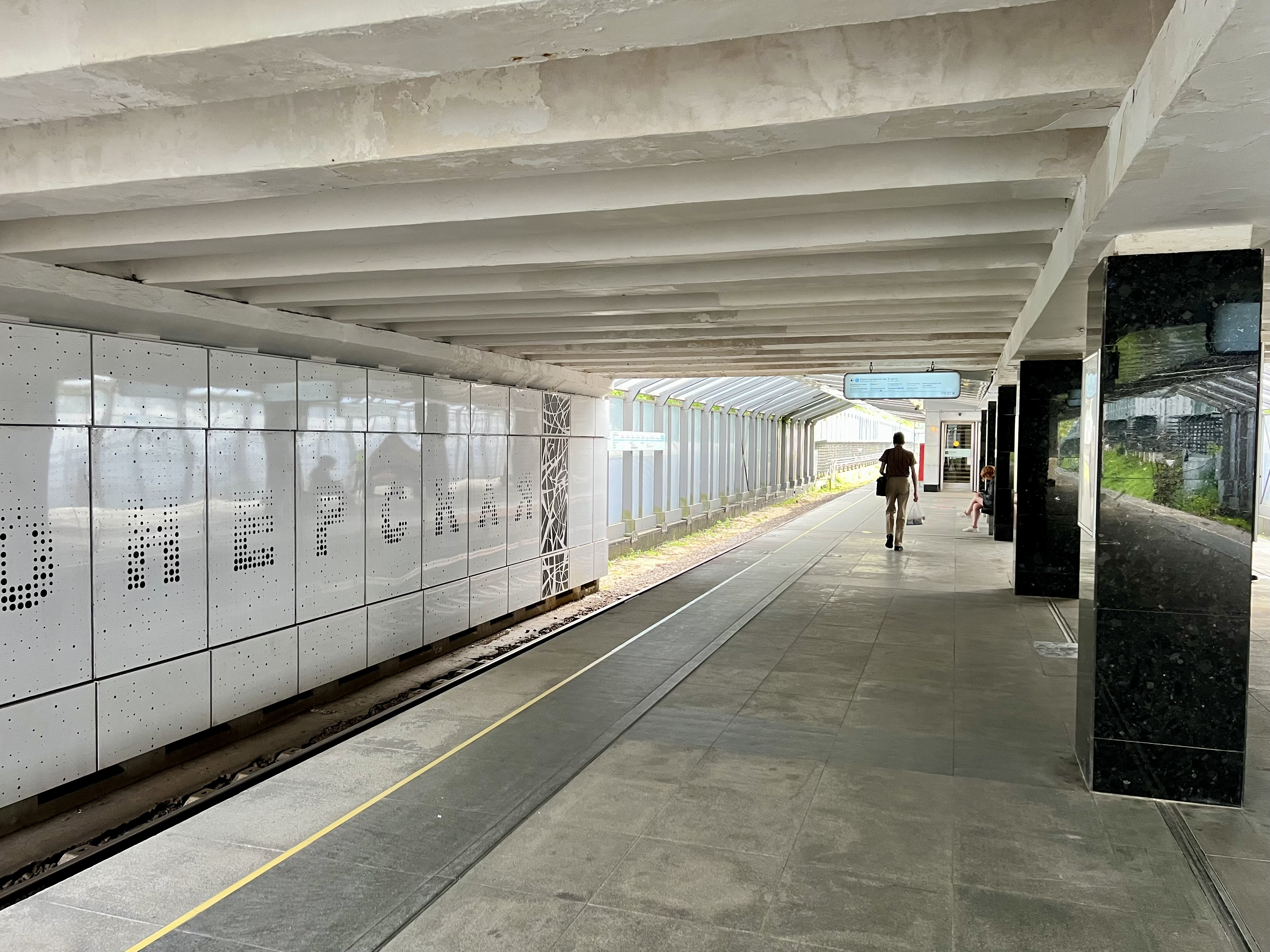

General information
- Location: Malaya Filyovskaya Street, Fili-Davydkovo District, Western Administrative Okrug
- Coordinates: 55.7360°N 37.4671°E
- System: Moscow Metro station
- Owner: Moskovsky Metropoliten
- Line: Filyovskaya line
- Platforms: 1 island platform
- Tracks: 2
- Connections: Bus: 73, 109, 135, 178

Construction
- Structure type: Ground-level, open
- Platform levels: 1
- Parking: No

Other information
- Station code: 063

History
- Opened: 13 October 1961; 64 years ago

Services
| Preceding station | Moscow Metro | Following station |
|---|---|---|
| Kuntsevskaya Terminus | Filyovskaya line | Filyovsky Park towards Aleksandrovsky Sad |
Route map
Location
- Location within Moscow Metro

Pionerskaya (Russian: Пионе́рская) is a Moscow Metro station in the Fili-Davydkovo District, Western Administrative Okrug, Moscow. It is on the Filyovskaya Line between Kuntsevskaya and Filyovsky Park stations. It was built in 1961 in the vicinity of the former village of Mazilovo, and was the terminus of the line until 1965.

== Building ==
The station sits in a shallow cut, with the platform on the lower level and the street-level vestibule above. A road overpass (providing access to the vestibule) covers part of the platform; the rest is protected only by a narrow canopy. The single row of pillars is faced with white marble and the platform is a plain concrete slab. The architect was Rober Pogrebnoi.
