= Terekhovo (Moscow Metro) =

Moscow Metro station

Terekhovo Терехово
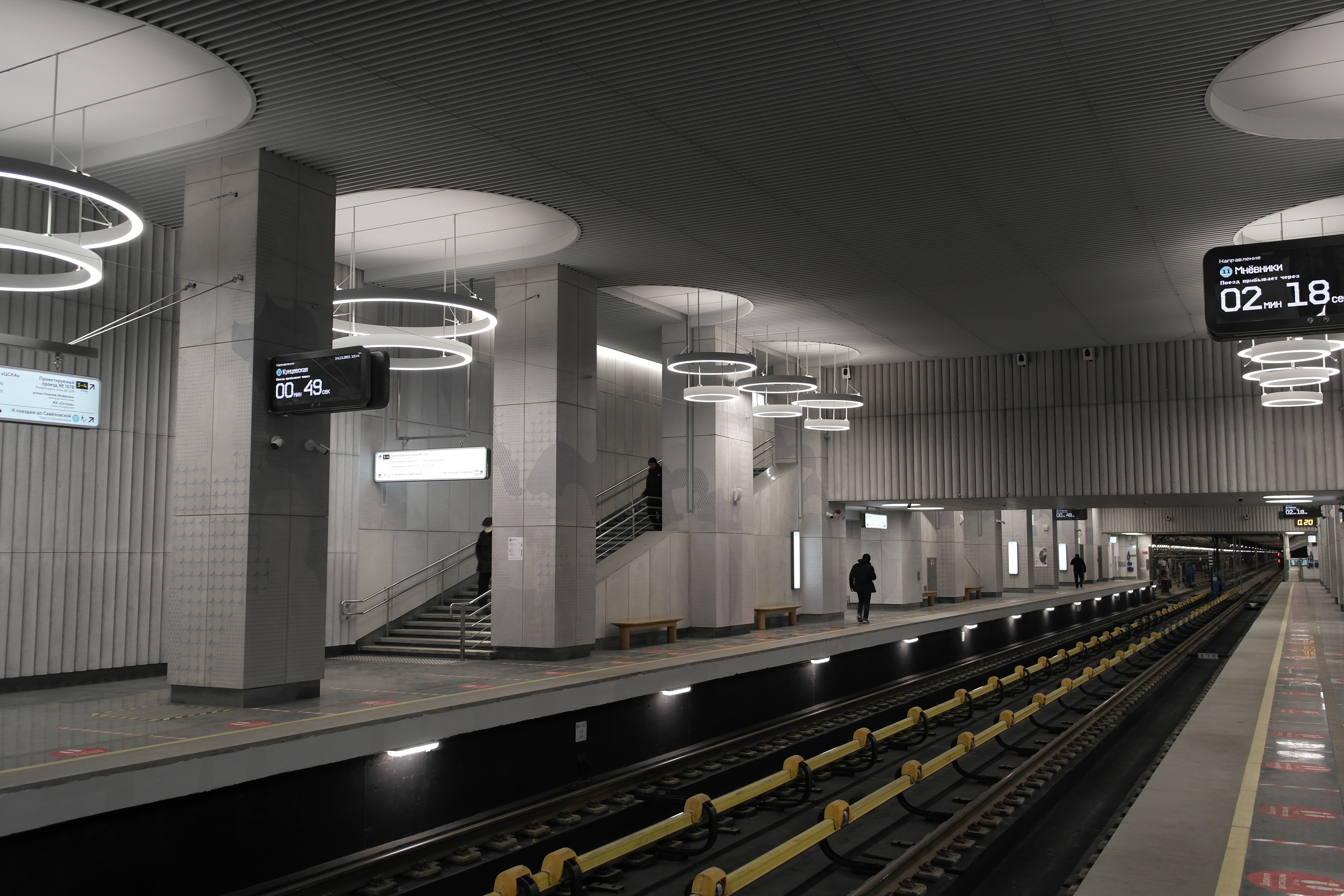

General information
- Location: Khoroshyovo-Mnyovniki District, North-Western Administrative Okrug; Moscow; Russia
- Coordinates: 55.7492°N 37.4606°E
- System: Moscow Metro station
- Owner: Moskovsky Metropoliten
- Line: Bolshaya Koltsevaya line
- Platforms: 2
- Tracks: 2

Construction
- Structure type: Shallow column station
- Depth: 22.5 metres (74 ft)
- Platform levels: 1
- Architect: Olga Aleksakova, Yulia Burdova (BuroMoscow)

History
- Opened: 7 December 2021; 4 years ago

Services
Preceding station	Moscow Metro	Following station
Kuntsevskaya anticlockwise / outer	Bolshaya Koltsevaya line	Mnyovniki clockwise / inner
Route map
Bolshaya Koltsevaya line
Location
- Location within Moscow Metro

Terekhovo (Russian: Терехово) is a station on the Bolshaya Koltsevaya line of the Moscow Metro. It was opened on 7 December 2021 as part of the section between Mnyovniki and Kakhovskaya.

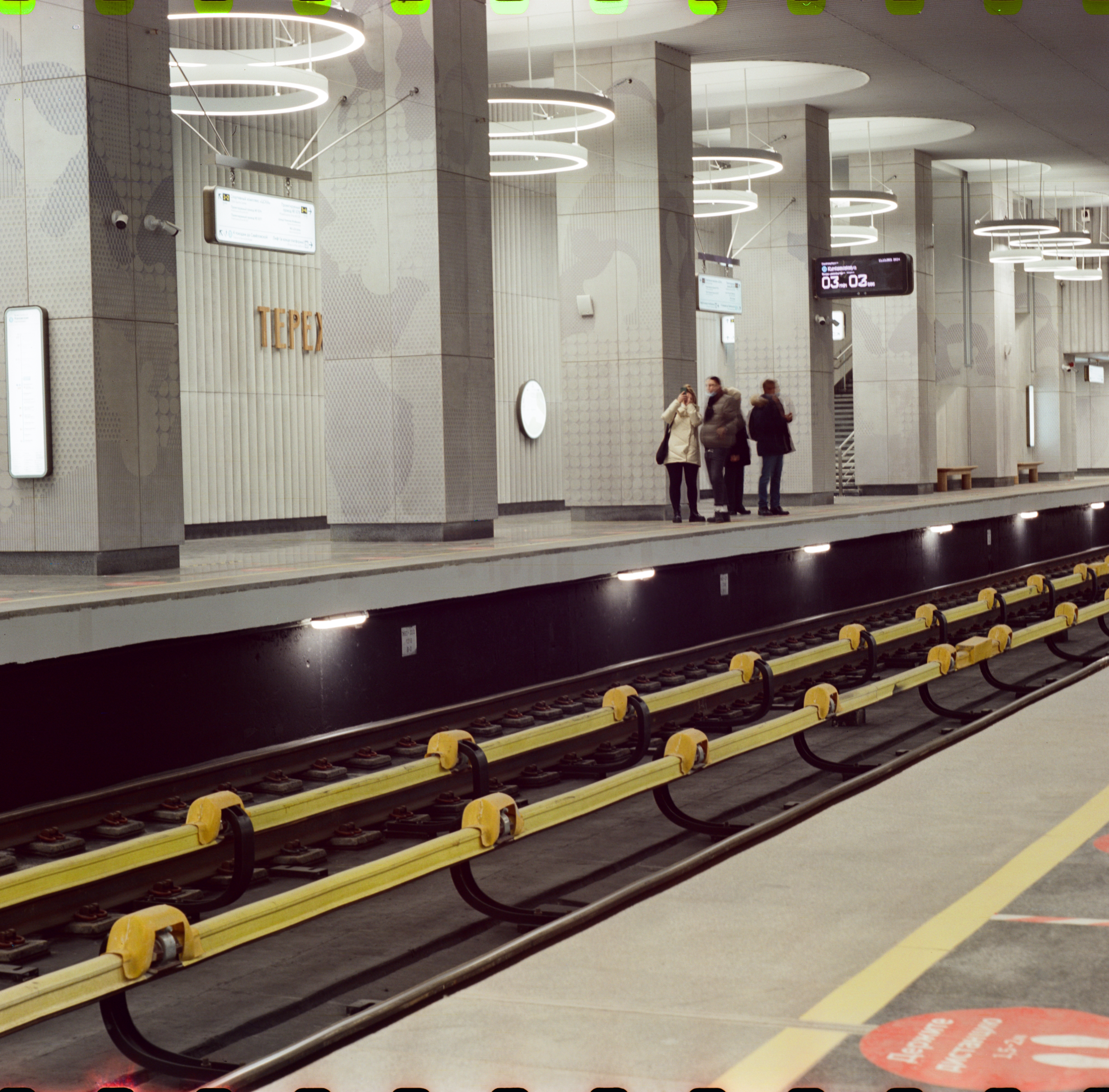
Interior details of Terekhovo station platforms
