= Kuntsevskaya (Arbatsko-Pokrovskaya and Filyovskaya lines) =

Moscow Metro station

Kuntsevskaya Кунцевская
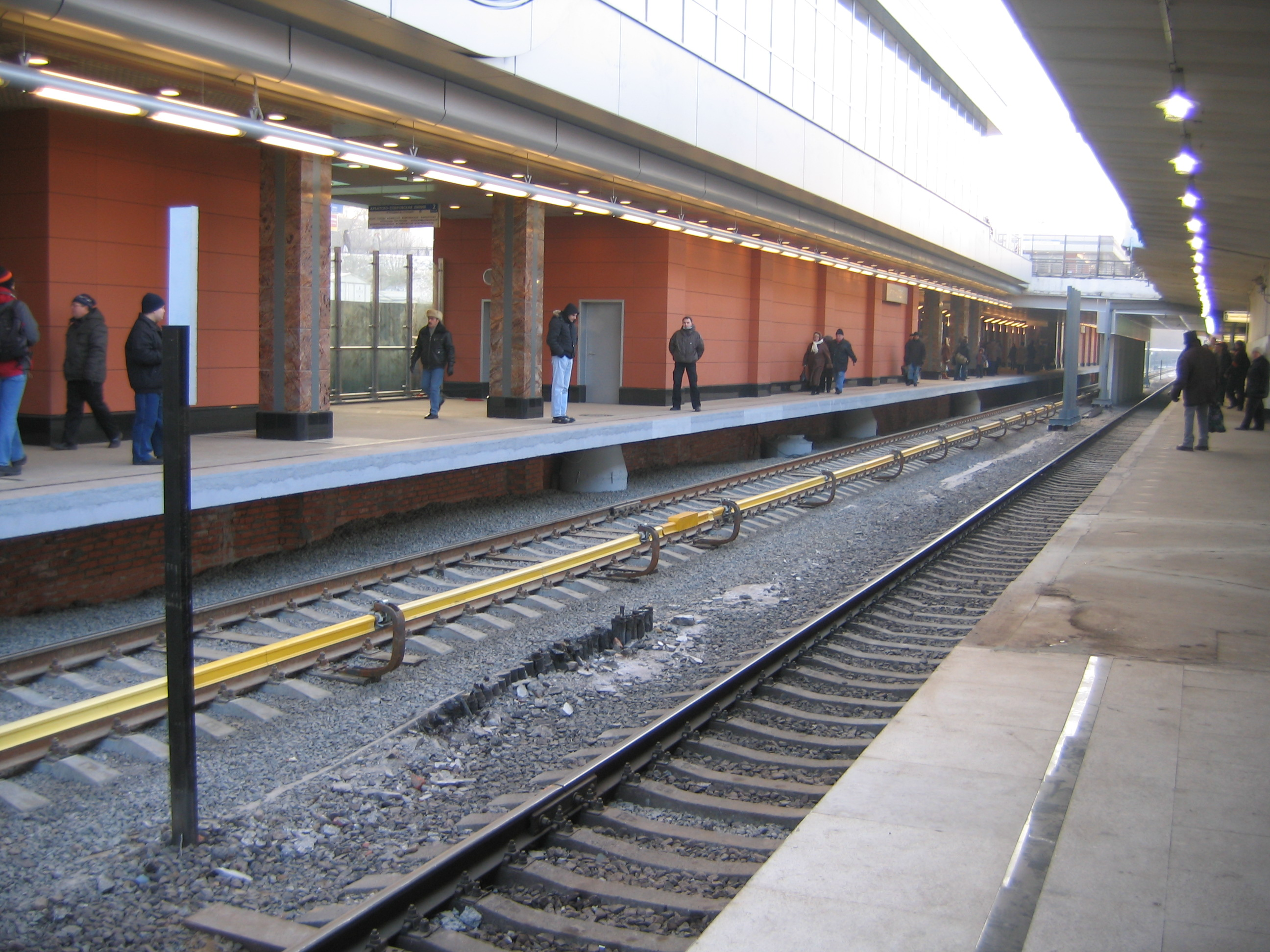

General information
- Location: Rublyovskoye Highway; Kuntsevo District; Western Administrative Okrug; Moscow; Russia
- Coordinates: 55.7307°N 37.4459°E
- System: Moscow Metro station
- Owner: Moskovsky Metropoliten
- Lines: Arbatsko-Pokrovskaya line Filyovskaya line
- Platforms: 1 side platform 1 island platform
- Tracks: 3
- Connections: Bus: 11, 16, 45, 58, 73, 91, 135, 178, 190, 236, 240, 255, 610, 612, 688, 733, 867

Construction
- Structure type: Ground-level, open
- Platform levels: 1
- Parking: No

Other information
- Station code: 064 (northern entrance); 210 (southern entrance)

History
- Opened: 31 August 1965; 60 years ago
- Rebuilt: 7 January 2008; 18 years ago

Services
Preceding station	Moscow Metro	Following station
Molodyozhnaya towards Pyatnitskoye Shosse	Arbatsko-Pokrovskaya line	Slavyansky Bulvar towards Shchyolkovskaya
Terminus	Filyovskaya line	Pionerskaya towards Aleksandrovsky Sad
Davydkovo anticlockwise / outer	Bolshaya Koltsevaya line transfer at Kuntsevskaya	Terekhovo clockwise / inner
Route map
Arbatsko-Pokrovskaya line
Filyovskaya line
Location
- Location within Moscow Metro

Kuntsevskaya (Russian: Кунцевская) is a Moscow Metro station in the Kuntsevo District, Western Administrative Okrug, Moscow, Russia. It is on the Arbatsko-Pokrovskaya and Filyovskaya Lines of Moscow Metro serving as a cross-platform interchange between them and as a terminus of the latter. The station originally opened on 31 August 1965, as part of the extension of the Filyovsky radius, but on 7 January 2008 it was expanded and rebuilt as a part of the Strogino–Mitino extension.

== Description ==
The 1965 construction was designed by Robert Pogrebnoy to a standard design of the 1960s surface level stations, with two identical glazed vestibules on either side of the Rublyovo highway, and two canopies extending over each of the platform ends supported by a single row of marble pillars.

The 2008 reconstruction was designed by architect A. Vigdorov, and added a new longer platform running parallel to the old one, larger modern vestibules, and extending the old platform to provide access over the Arbatsko-Porkovskaya's tracks via a glazed overpass. This was necessary as the old platform length was designed for the Filyovskaya's six-car trains, whilst the Arbatsko-Pokrovskaya presently operates seven-car trains, with likelihood of them being further lengthened to eight cars.

The north platform was closed for reconstruction from October 2017 to March 2019. A transfer to Kuntsevskaya was opened on 7 December 2021.

== Operation ==
Before reconstruction, Kuntsevskaya was operating on a regular basis as did any other station of the Moscow Metro, meaning that trains were passing right-hand side with access through the left door. It was directly connected to the Pionerskaya and Molodyozhnaya stations of the Filyovskaya Line.

The current operation differs in terms of servicing. That is, the new one-track platform gathers trains of Arbatsko-Pokrovskaya arriving from Strogino and dispatches them to Slavyanskiy Bulvar. Arbatsko-Pokrovskaya trains moving in the opposite direction arrive at the southern track of the old platform, while the remaining track is used by Filyovskaya Line (trains coming from Pionerskaya arrive at the track and then head back to Pionerskaya from the same track).

== Station design ==
Architecturally the new platform sufficiently differs from its older neighbour, which was the last of the 1960s surface stations of the Moscow Metro, built at a time when the minimum of resources was spent on architecture and engineering. It includes two vestibules: the western one has its ticket hall outside, whilst the larger eastern one encompasses it into one large structure; marble and granite as well as new metalloplastic materials of orange and brown tones are used.

In the future it is planned that the older platform will also be upgraded with newer technology and decoration similar to its neighbour.

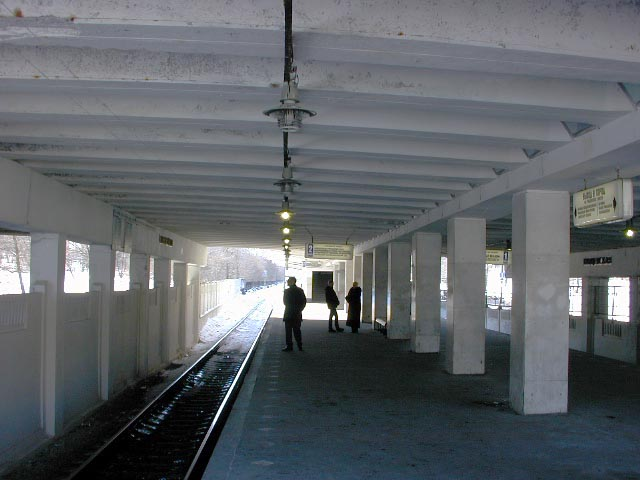
Older 1965 platform
