= Molodyozhnaya (Moscow Metro) =

Moscow Metro station

Molodyozhnaya Молодёжная
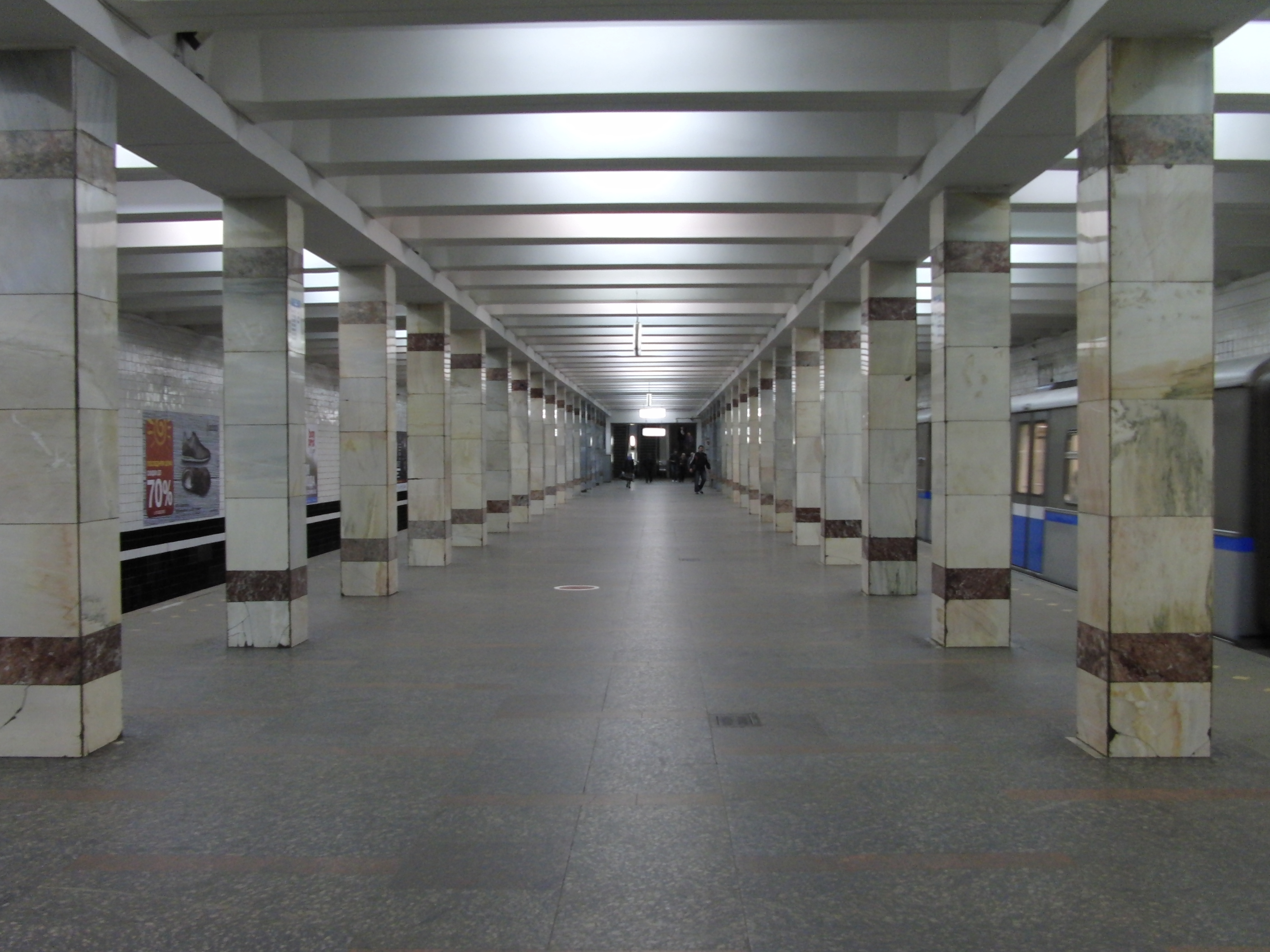

General information
- Location: Yelninskaya Street; Kuntsevo District; Western Administrative Okrug; Moscow; Russia
- Coordinates: 55.7408°N 37.4168°E
- System: Moscow Metro station
- Owner: Moskovsky Metropoliten
- Line: Arbatsko-Pokrovskaya line
- Platforms: 1 island platform
- Tracks: 2
- Connections: Bus: 58, 73, 127, 135, 190, 229, 251, 626, 660, 691, 732, 757, 794, 829

Construction
- Structure type: Shallow column tri-span
- Depth: 6.5 metres (21 ft)
- Platform levels: 1
- Parking: No

Other information
- Station code: 065

History
- Opened: 5 July 1965; 61 years ago

Passengers
- 2009: 22,716,505

Services
Preceding station	Moscow Metro	Following station
Krylatskoye towards Pyatnitskoye Shosse	Arbatsko-Pokrovskaya line	Kuntsevskaya towards Shchyolkovskaya
Route map
Location
- Location within Moscow Metro

Molodyozhnaya (Russian: Молодёжная) is a Moscow Metro station in the Kuntsevo District, Western Administrative Okrug, Moscow. Located between Krylatskoye and Kuntsevskaya stations, it is on the Arbatsko-Pokrovskaya Line. Molodyozhnaya was opened in 1965 as a part of the Filyovskaya Line. On 7 January 2008 the station was detached from the line on which it had been for 42 years.

== Building ==
The station was designed by the architect Rimidalv Pogrebnoy. It has the standard pillar-trispan design. The pillars are white marble with bands of pink marble at the top and bottom. The walls are tiled.

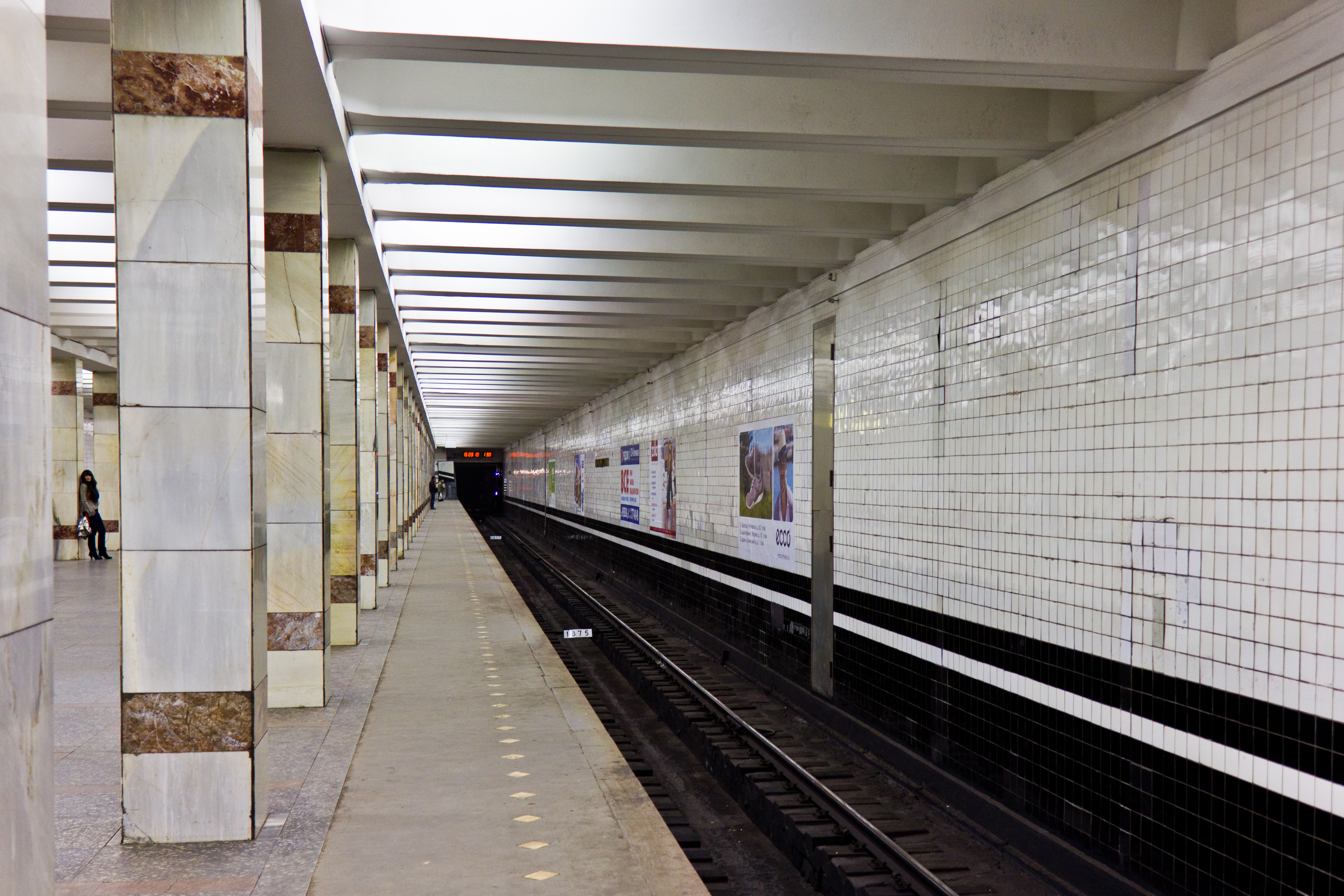
Platform of the station

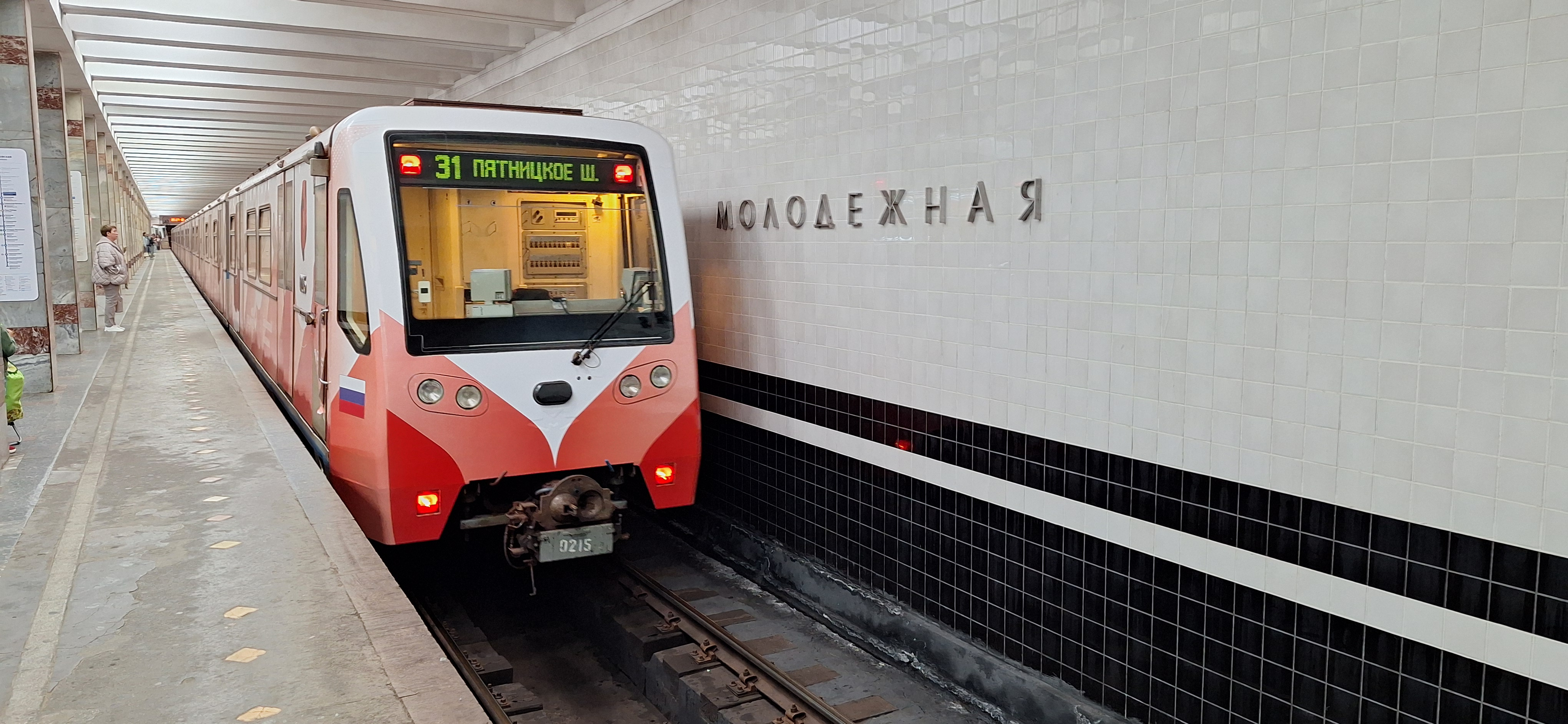
Thematic train
