= Vladimir Markin (journalist) =

Russian journalist and politician (1956–2021)

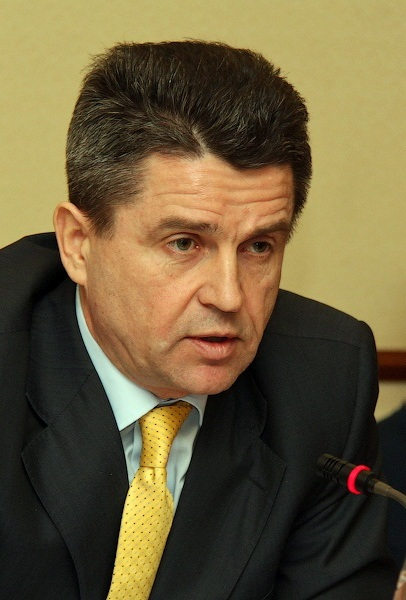
- Markin in 2011

First Deputy Chairman of RusHydro
- In office 12 October 2016 – 19 February 2019

Chairman of the Department for Interaction with Mass Media of the Investigative Committee of Russia
- In office 13 September 2007 – 6 October 2016
- Preceded by: position established
- Succeeded by: Svetlana Petrenko

Personal details
- Born: 23 November 1956 Chelyabinsk, Russian SFSR, Soviet Union
- Died: 12 October 2021 (aged 64) Moscow, Russia
- Vladimir Markin's voice From the Echo of Moscow program, 1 July 2013

Vladimir Ivanovich Markin (Russian: Влади́мир Ива́нович Ма́ркин; 23 November 1956 – 12 October 2021) was a Russian journalist and politician. He served as Chairman of the Department for Interaction with Mass Media of the Investigative Committee of Russia from 2007 to 2016, the first person to hold the position following the committee's founding. He also served as First Deputy Chairman of RusHydro from 2016 to 2019.
