= Slavyansky Bulvar =

Moscow Metro station

Slavyansky Bulvar Славянский бульвар
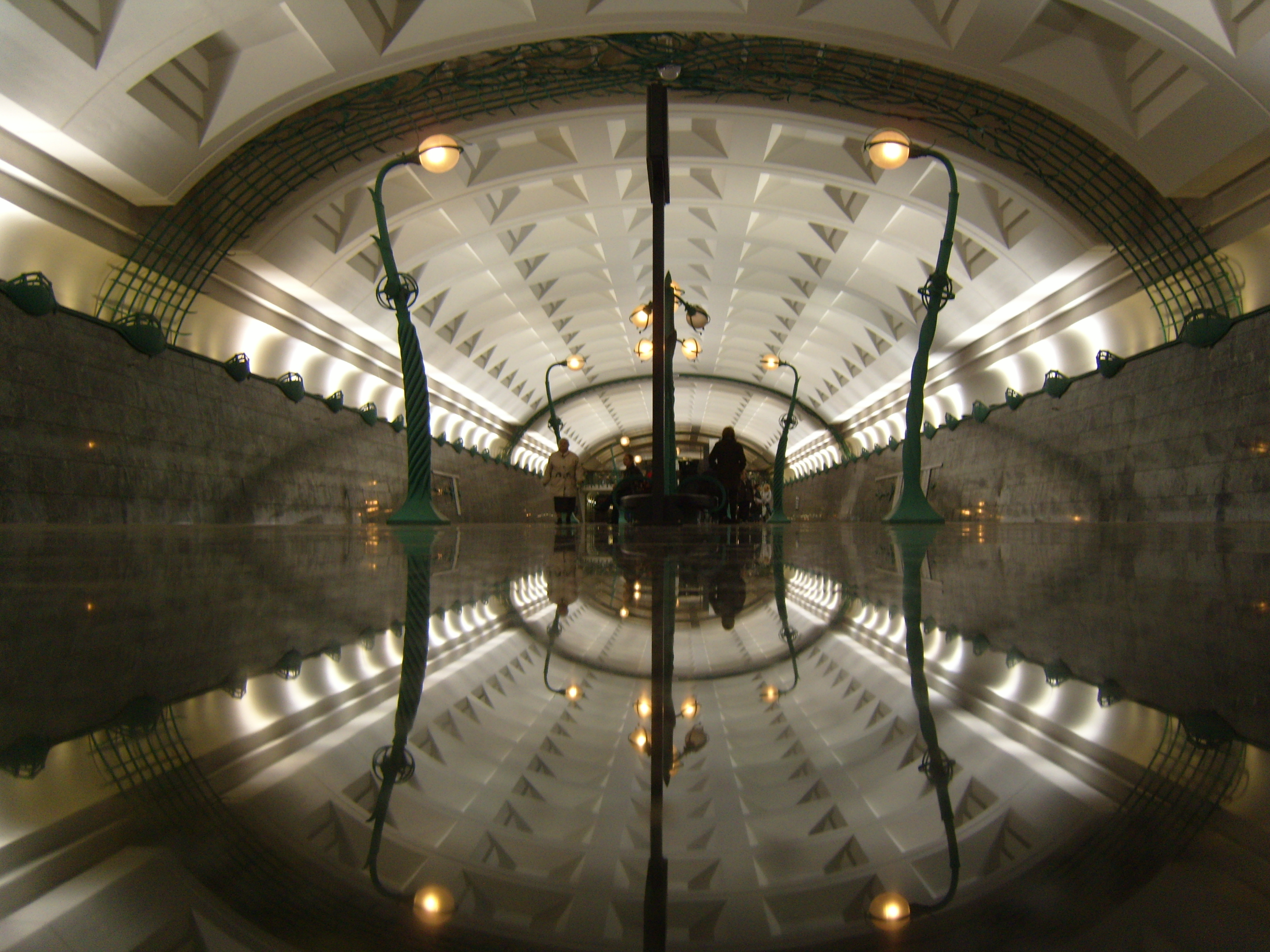

General information
- Location: Rublyovskoye Highway; Fili-Davydkovo District; Western Administrative Okrug; Moscow; Russia
- Coordinates: 55.7296°N 37.4706°E
- System: Moscow Metro station
- Owner: Moskovsky Metropoliten
- Line: Arbatsko-Pokrovskaya line
- Platforms: 1 island platform
- Tracks: 2
- Connections: Bus: 77, 103, 104, 139, 157, 157к, 205, 231, 325, 329, 341, 464, 622, 641, 732, 818, 840, н2 (overnight)

Construction
- Structure type: Shallow single-span
- Depth: 10 metres (33 ft)
- Platform levels: 1
- Parking: Yes
- Accessible: Yes

History
- Opened: 7 September 2008; 17 years ago

Services
Preceding station	Moscow Metro	Following station
Kuntsevskaya towards Pyatnitskoye Shosse	Arbatsko-Pokrovskaya line	Park Pobedy towards Shchyolkovskaya
Route map
Location
- Location within Moscow Metro

Slavyansky Bulvar (Russian: Славянский бульвар) is a Moscow Metro station in the Fili-Davydkovo District, Western Administrative Okrug, Moscow. It is on the Arbatsko-Pokrovskaya Line, between Kuntsevskaya and Park Pobedy stations. Built as part of the stretch that bypasses most of the surface stretch of the Filyovskaya Line, Slavyansky Bulvar serves the residents of the southwestern districts situated between the Fruzensky and Filyovsky radii. The station was opened on 7 September 2008.

== Description ==
Originally the section between Kuntsevskaya and Park Pobedy was to have two stations instead of one. The first one, Minskaya was to be located on the western side of Moscow's Victory Park near the intersection of Minskaya Street and Kutuzovsky Avenue. Whilst the second station, Slavyansky Bulvar, was to be located on the southern side of the same Kutuzovsky prospect in the Fili-Davydkovo District, next to the Slavyansky Boulevard (hence the name), construction of which began to a point where the future pit was ready for the tunnel boring shield. However the prioritisation of constructing a line to Strogino, and the importance of locking the bypass made the Moscow government change its original plan. The curvature of the bypass was reduced (and thus its length by 0.9 km), as was the number of stations to save time. Originally the station Minskaya was more favoured, but under pressure of locals, the location of Minskaya would leave a provision for a station to be built in at a later date, and Slavyansky Bulvar was returned, however the change of the track path meant that the station would now be on the northern side of the avenue, on the intersection with the Starorublyovskoye highway.

The station, designed by architect S.Volovich, is a single-vault design of shallow depth. The vault rests on horizontal walls, due to the favourable hydroisolation conditions that are present there. Internally the walls are revetted with green Cuban marble "Verde Guatemala", topped with aluminium profile onto which lighting elements are fixed. Grey granite "Aleksandorovsky" covers the floor apart from platform edge, which has a darker "Gabbro". In addition the platform has three beech benches.

The station has two underground vestibules and serves as a junction with surface urban traffic.

== December 2017 incident ==
On 25 December 2017, a public bus ploughed into the wide staircase entrance of a pedestrian underpass of the station, 5 people died, and the bus driver was arrested.
