= Mnyovniki (Moscow Metro) =

Moscow Metro station

Mnyovniki Мнёвники
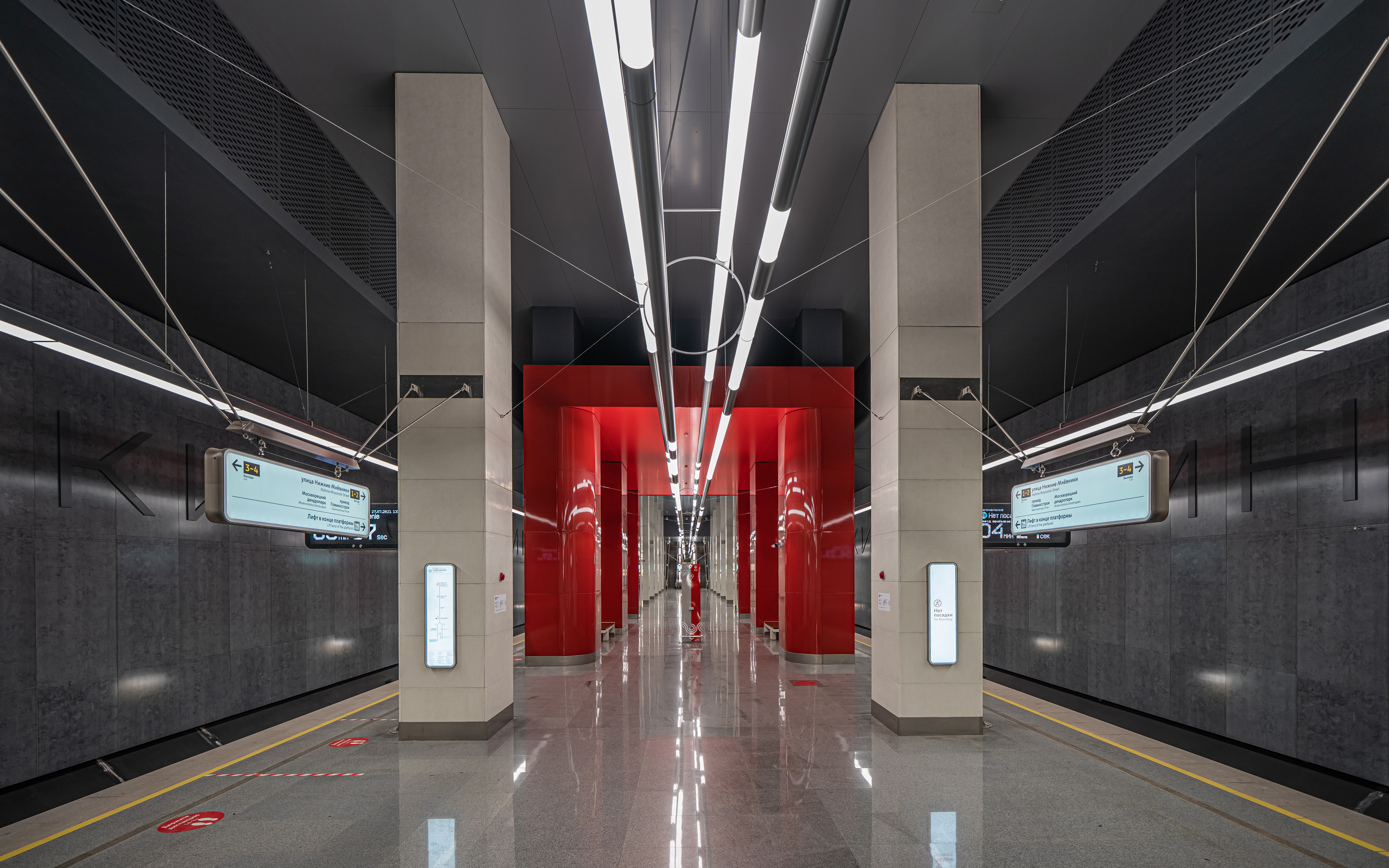

General information
- Location: Khoroshyovo-Mnyovniki District, North-Western Administrative Okrug; Moscow; Russia
- Coordinates: 55.7600°N 37.4708°E
- System: Moscow Metro station
- Owner: Moskovsky Metropoliten
- Line: Bolshaya Koltsevaya line
- Platforms: 1 island platform
- Tracks: 2

Construction
- Structure type: Shallow column station
- Depth: 27 metres (89 ft)
- Platform levels: 1
- Architect: Timur Bashkaev

History
- Opened: 1 April 2021

Services
Preceding station	Moscow Metro	Following station
Terekhovo anticlockwise / outer	Bolshaya Koltsevaya line	Narodnoye Opolcheniye clockwise / inner
Route map
Bolshaya Koltsevaya line
Location
- Location within Moscow Metro

Mnyovniki (Russian: Мнёвники) is a station on the Bolshaya Koltsevaya line of the Moscow Metro. It opened on 1 April 2021. It remained the terminus of the line until on 7 December 2021 an extension to Kakhovskaya opened.
