= Sovremennik Theatre =

Theatre company in Moscow

Sovremennik
- Современник
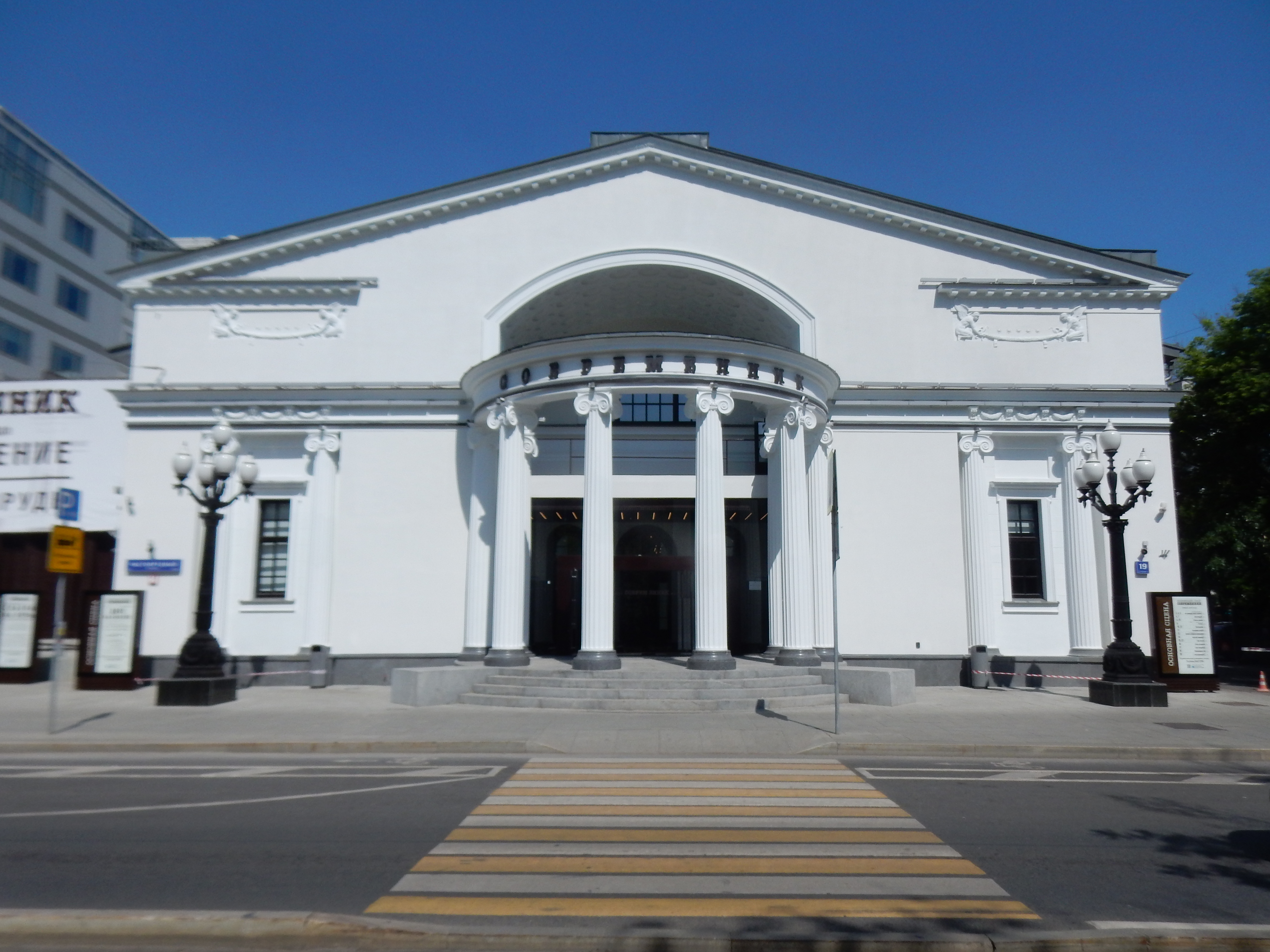
- Sovremennik Theatre, main entrance
- Interactive map of Sovremennik
- Address: Chistoprudny Boulevard 19A; Basmanny District, Moscow; Russia
- Coordinates: 55°45′42″N 37°38′45″E
- Public transit: Chistye Prudy, Turgenevskaya, Sretensky Bulvar (Moscow Metro)

Construction
- Opened: 1956

Website
- www.sovremennik.ru

Moscow Sovremennik Theatre (Russian: Московский театр «Современник») is a theatre company in Moscow founded in 1956. "Sovremennik" means "Contemporary".

== History ==
The Sovremennik Theatre was founded by a group of young Soviet actors during the Khrushchev Thaw. Among the founders, all of whom graduated from Moscow Art Theatre School-Studio, were Oleg Yefremov, Galina Volchek, Igor Kvasha, Liliya Tolmachyova, Yevgeny Yevstigneyev and Oleg Tabakov. The debut production was Victor Rozov's play Forever Alive. The theatre's first artistic director, Oleg Yefremov, left in 1970. It was then led by Galina Volchek until her death.

== Actors ==
- Georgi Burkov (1970−1971)
- Oleg Dahl (1968−1971, 1972−1975)
- Leonid Filatov (1985−1987)
- Valentin Gaft (1969−2019)
- Lyudmila Gurchenko (1964−1966)
- Igor Kvasha (1957−current)
- Andrey Myagkov (1965−1977)
- Marina Neyolova (1974−current)
- Viktor Pavlov (1962−1965)
- Oleg Tabakov (1957−1983)
- Anastasiya Vertinskaya (1968−1980)
- Vladislav Vetrov (2002−2024)
- Galina Volchek (1956−2019)
- Oleg Yefremov (1956−1970)
- Yevgeny Yevstigneyev (1956−1992)
