= Kuznetsky Most (Moscow Metro) =

Moscow Metro station

Kuznetsky Most Кузнецкий мост
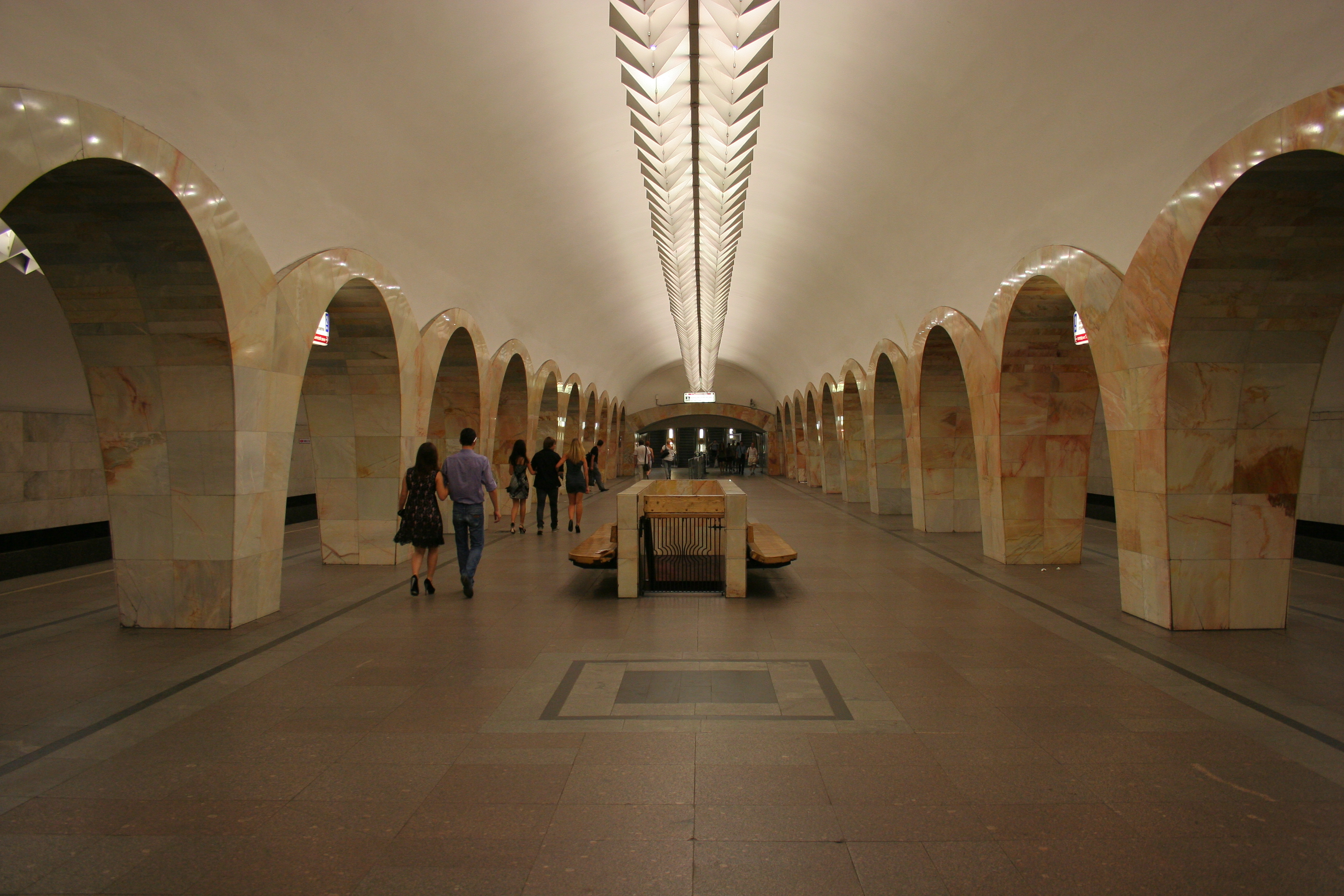

General information
- Location: Rozhdestvenka Street; Meshchansky District; Central Administrative Okrug; Moscow; Russia
- Coordinates: 55.7606°N 37.6259°E
- System: Moscow Metro station
- Owner: Moskovsky Metropoliten
- Line: Tagansko-Krasnopresnenskaya line
- Platforms: 1 island platform
- Tracks: 2

Construction
- Depth: 39.5 metres (130 ft)
- Platform levels: 1
- Parking: No

Other information
- Station code: 118

History
- Opened: 17 December 1975; 50 years ago

Services
Preceding station	Moscow Metro	Following station
Pushkinskaya towards Planernaya	Tagansko-Krasnopresnenskaya line	Kitay-gorod towards Kotelniki
Okhotny Ryad towards Potapovo	Sokolnicheskaya line transfer at Lubyanka	Chistye Prudy towards Bulvar Rokossovskogo
Route map
Location
- Location within Central Moscow

Kuznetsky Most (Russian: Кузне́цкий мост) is a Moscow Metro station in the Meshchansky District, Central Administrative Okrug, Moscow. It is on the Tagansko-Krasnopresnenskaya Line. Designed by Nina Aleshin and N. Samoylova the station was the first column type to be built since the 1950s. It was opened in 1975 as part of the linking segment between the Zhdanovskaya and Krasnopresnenskaya Line. Decoratively the station is a column tri-vault. The columns are faced with "gazgan" marble archways (reminding one of a viaduct). The floor is covered with polarised black granite. The snow-white marble of the walls is decorated with decorative artworks created by M. Alekseyev. The vestibule of the station is located in the courtyard of Rozhdestvenka Street, 6. At the opposite end of the station is a transfer to the Lubyanka station on the Sokolnicheskaya Line.

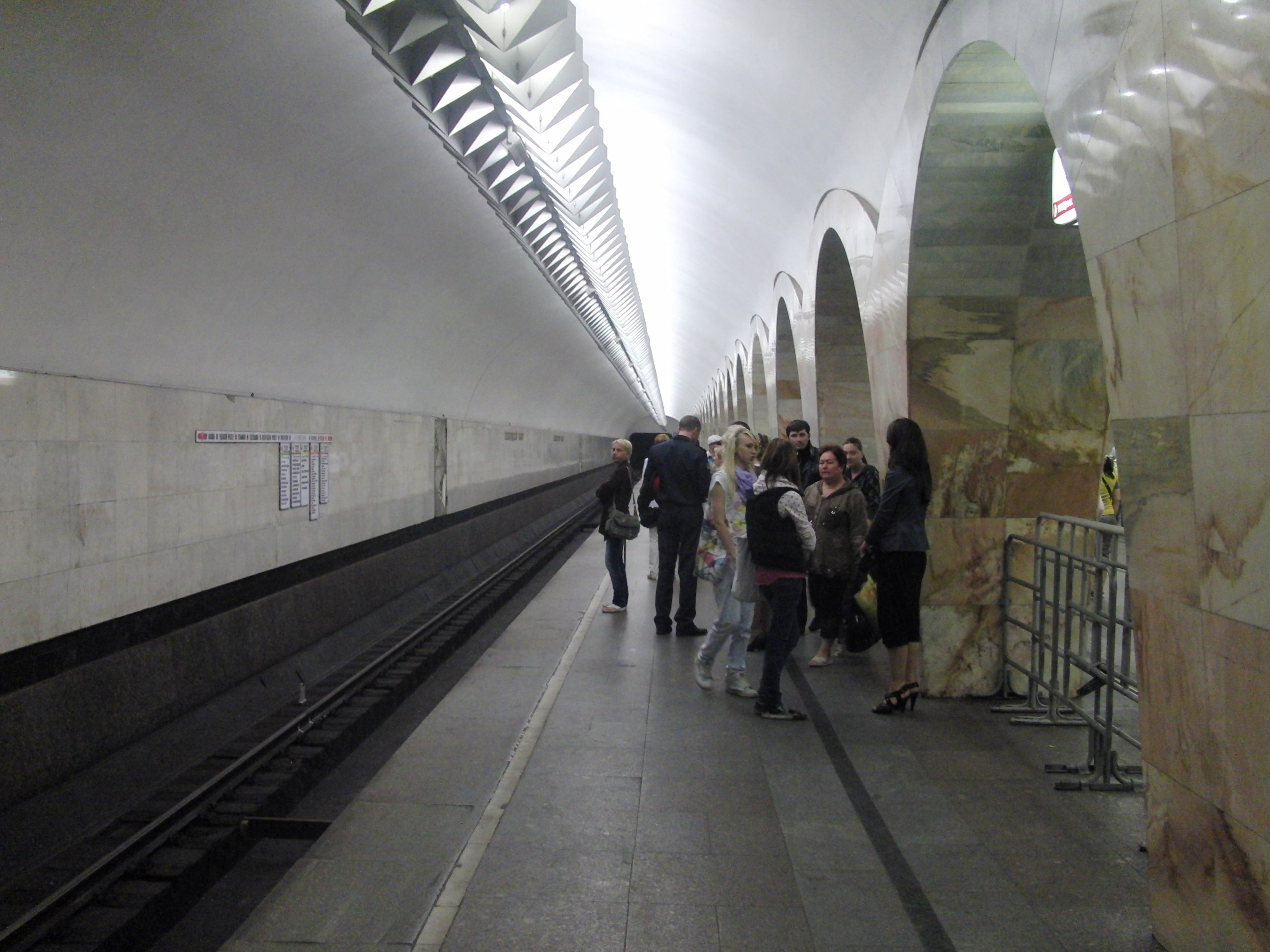
Platform view

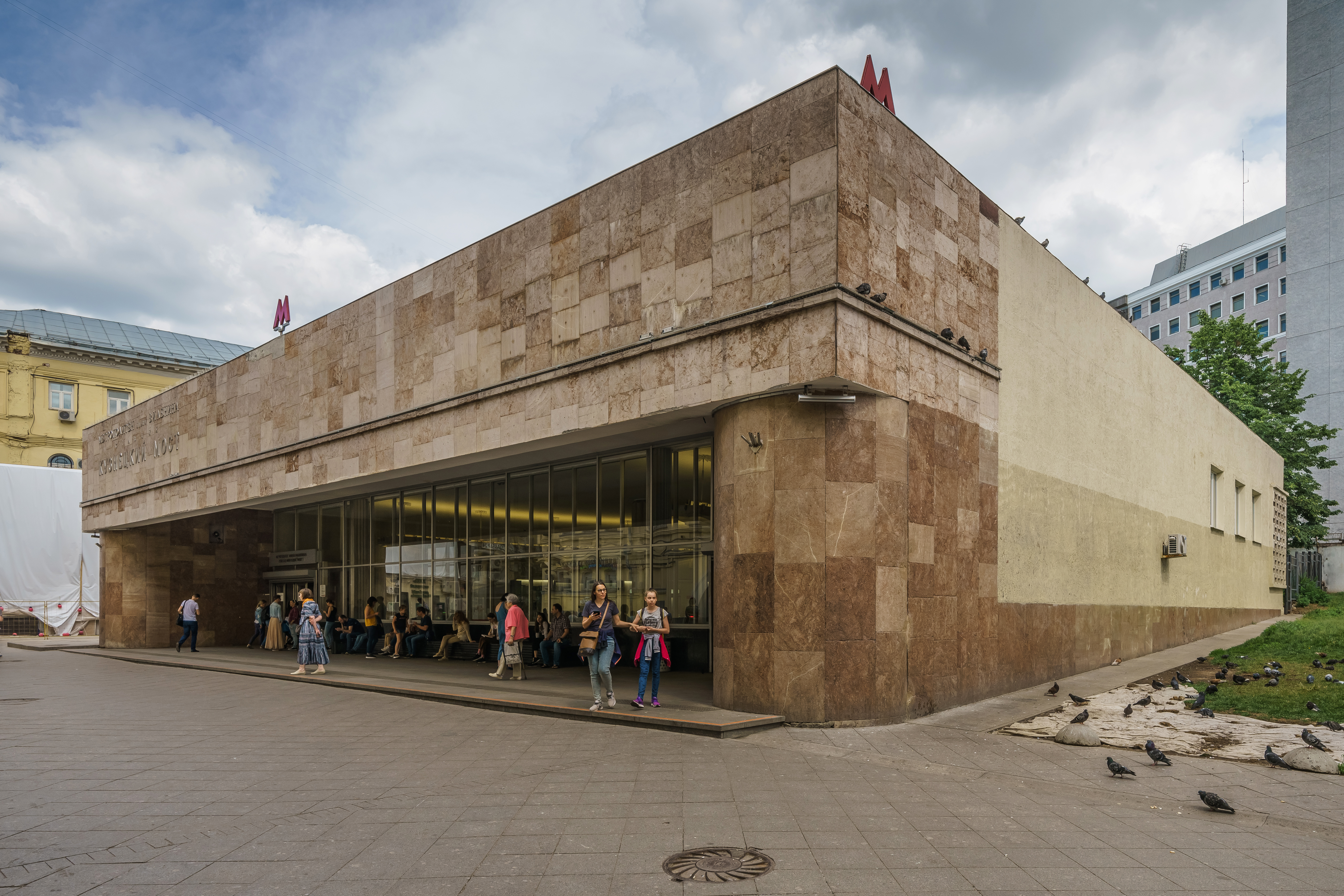
Entrance building
