= Sretensky Bulvar =

Moscow Metro station

Sretensky Bulvar Сретенский бульвар
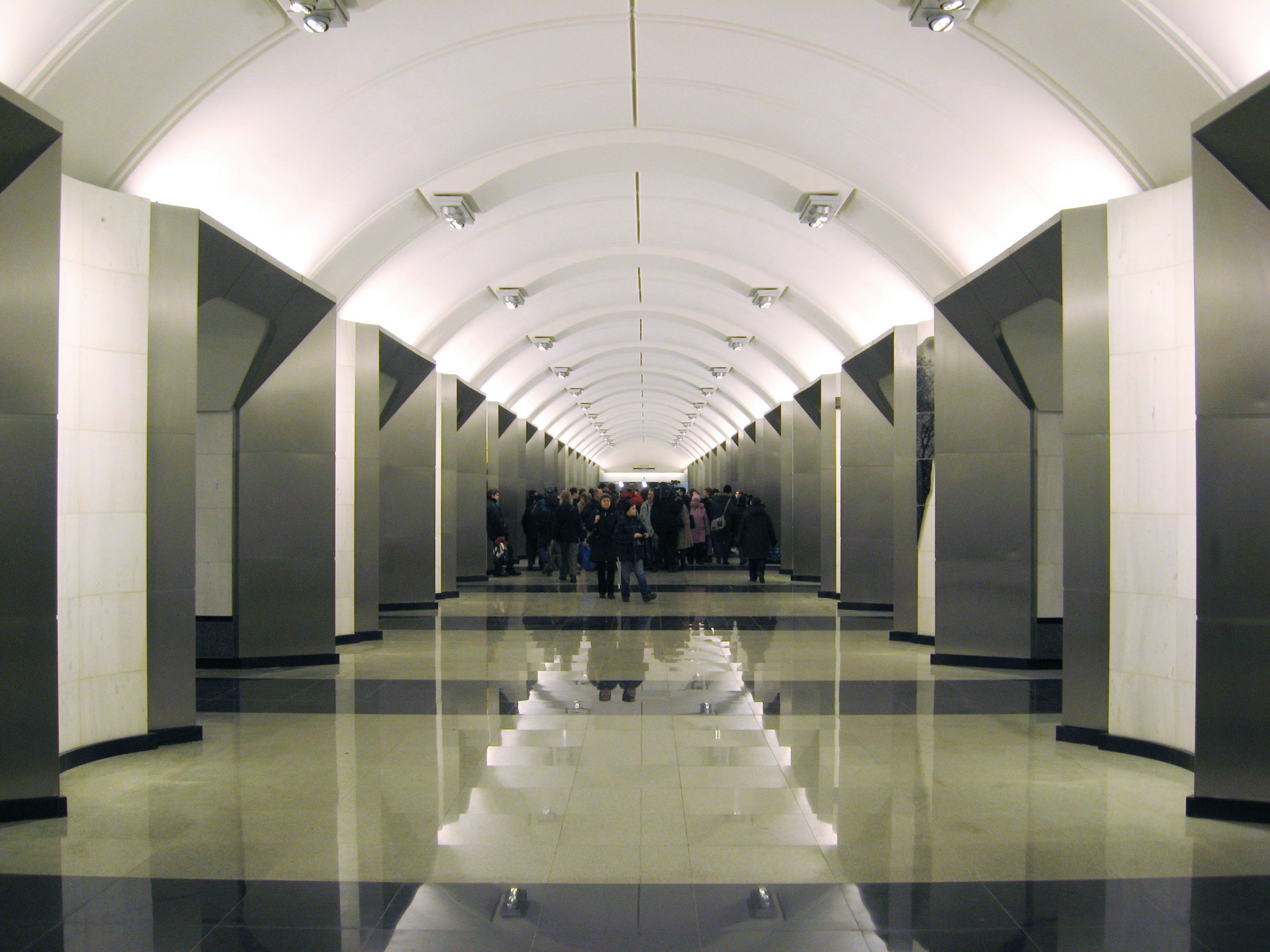

General information
- Location: Meshchansky District, Central Administrative Okrug; Moscow; Russia
- Coordinates: 55.7668°N 37.6392°E
- System: Moscow Metro station
- Owner: Moskovsky Metropoliten
- Line: Lyublinsko-Dmitrovskaya line
- Platforms: 1
- Tracks: 2
- Connections: Trolleybus: 9, 48; Tram: А, 3, 39

Construction
- Depth: 60 metres (200 ft)
- Platform levels: 1
- Parking: No

Other information
- Station code: 166

History
- Opened: 29 December 2007; 18 years ago

Services
Preceding station	Moscow Metro	Following station
Trubnaya towards Fiztekh	Lyublinsko-Dmitrovskaya line	Chkalovskaya towards Zyablikovo
Lubyanka towards Potapovo	Sokolnicheskaya line transfer at Chistye Prudy	Krasnye Vorota towards Bulvar Rokossovskogo
Kitay-gorod towards Novoyasenevskaya	Kaluzhsko-Rizhskaya line transfer at Turgenevskaya	Sukharevskaya towards Medvedkovo
Route map
Location
- Location within Central Moscow

Sretensky Bulvar (Russian: Сре́тенский бульва́р) is a Moscow Metro station in the Meshchansky District, Central Administrative Okrug, Moscow. It is located on the Lyublinsko-Dmitrovskaya Line, between Trubnaya and Chkalovskaya stations.

Sretensky Bulvar opened on 29 December 2007 after more than 25 years since groundbreaking.

== History ==
The construction, which began in the late 1980s, has frequently stalled as a result of continuous lack of funds. Only in 2004 did proper funding resume, which allowed finishing the construction.

The station opening had been long-awaited, as it is an interchange: Chistye Prudy of the Sokolnicheskaya Line and Turgenevskaya of the Kaluzhsko-Rizhskaya Line. The projected passenger dynamics for the station are 10,800 per hour on entry and 20,100 on exit, which allows for a dramatic occupancy decrease on the Koltsevaya Line, particularly on the Komsomolskaya — Kurskaya path.

== Design ==
The station, designed by architects N. Shumakov and G. Mun, features a standard Lyublinskaya pylon-trivault design with the base set as a monolith concrete plate. White fibreglass is used on the vaults of the central (9.5-metre (31.17 foot) diameter) and the platform halls (8.5 metres (28 ft)) as well as the escalator and transfer corridor ceilings, which also doubles the hydroisolation. Initially it was thought that the station's main decorative feature would include a set of three-metre-high (9.8 ft) bronze and rock sculptures in the niches of all 30 pylons. Made by leading Russian sculptors, they would stand on granite pedestals with luminescent lamps lighting down on top of them. However, recently it has emerged that this would be too costly, and hence the pylon design was altered to now include a set of metallic artworks on themes of the Boulevard Ring. White marble covers the floors, whilst flooring are done with granite.

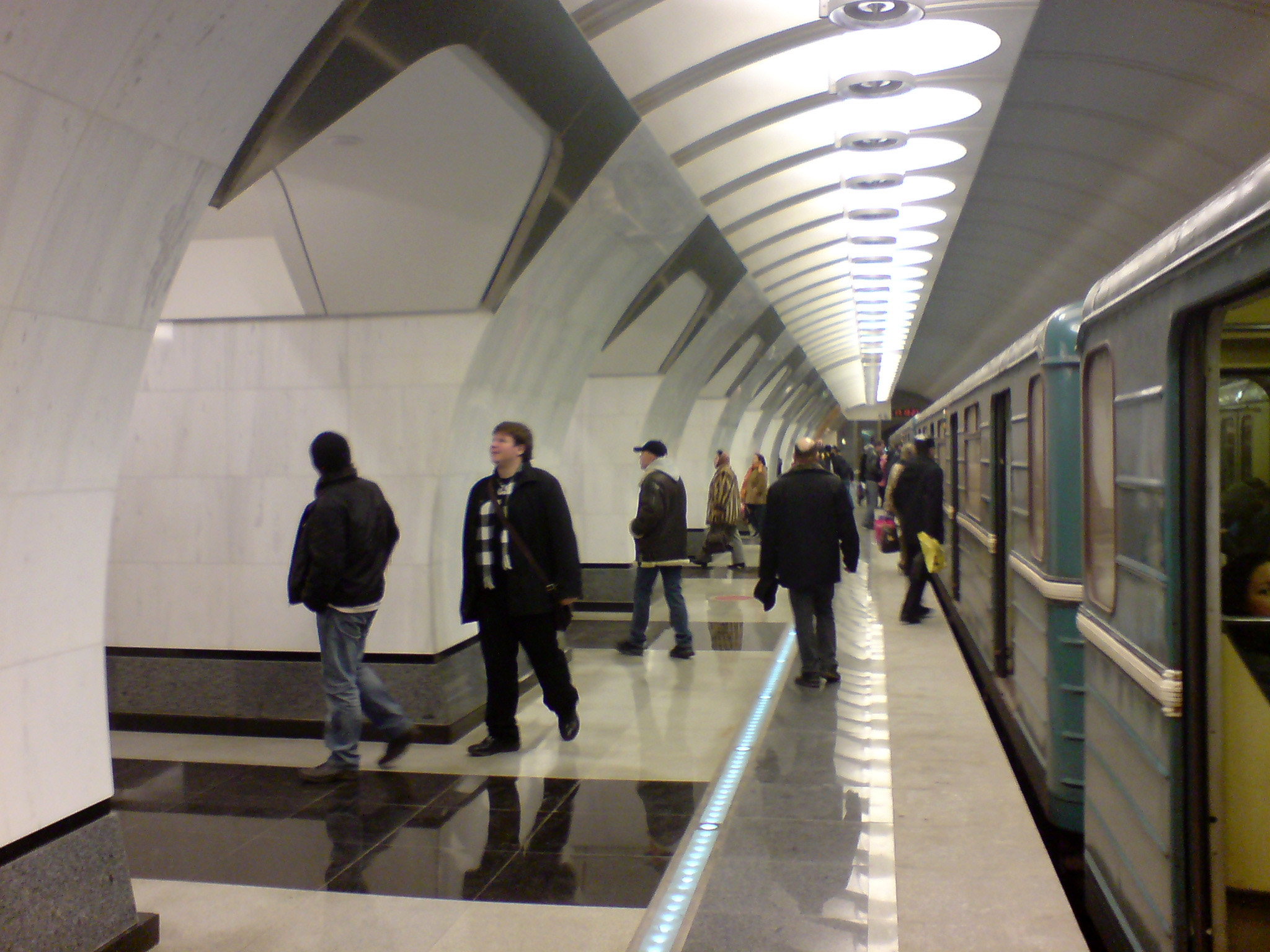
Platform of the station.

There are two escalator tunnels leading from both ends of the station: one directly to Chistye Prudy station, and the other to a combined transfer to Turgenevskaya as well as a diversion to a second escalator tunnel to the surface. The combined vestibule will be located underground the Turgenevskaya Square at the beginning of Academician Sakharov Avenue and next to the Sretensky Boulevard for which the station is named. In an effort to conserve the spendings and time, the vestibule and the escalator tunnel to the surface will open later.
