= Turgenevskaya =

Moscow Metro station

Turgenevskaya Тургеневская
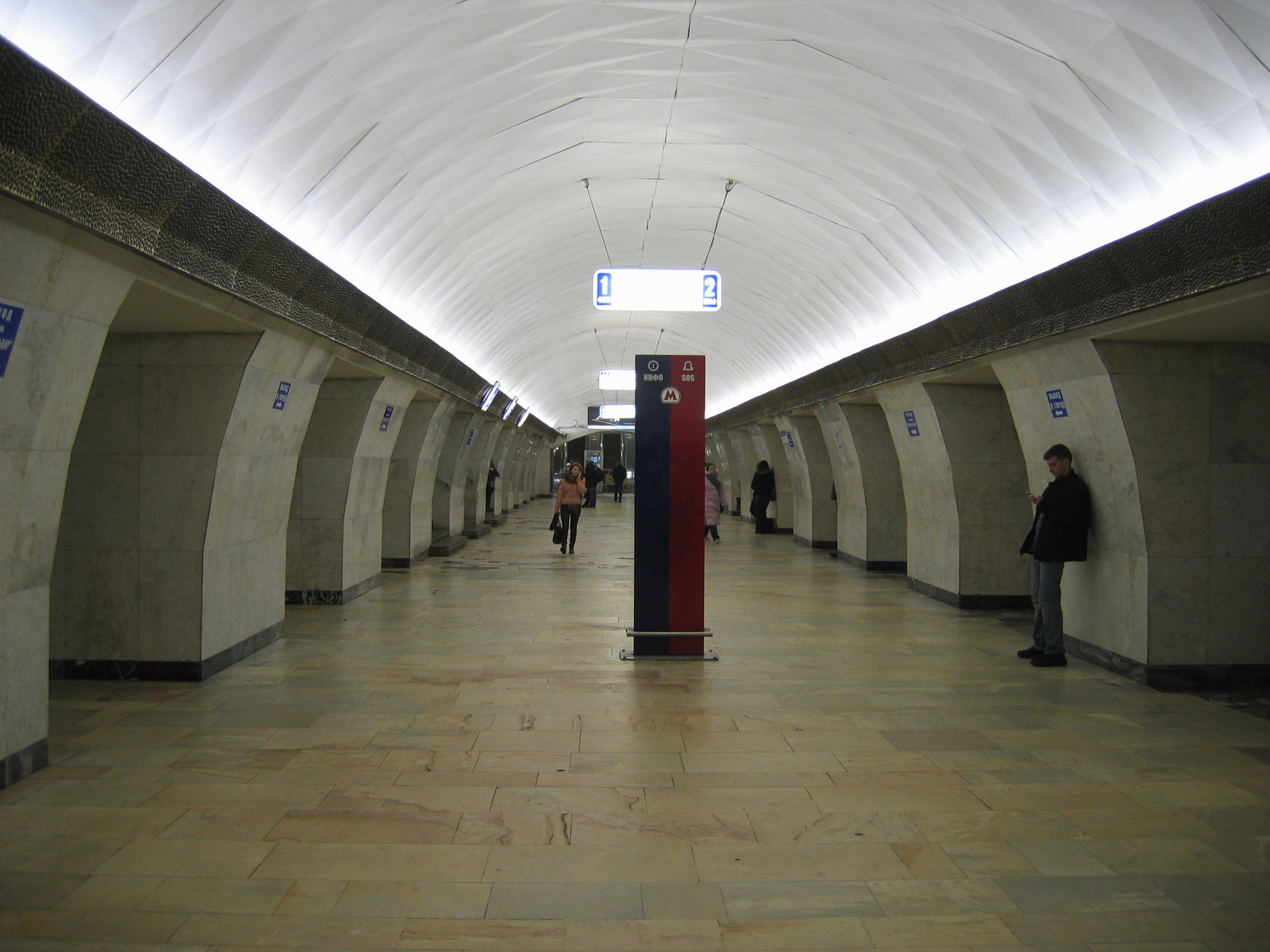

General information
- Location: Krasnoselsky District; Central Administrative Okrug; Moscow; Russia
- Coordinates: 55.7661°N 37.6374°E
- System: Moscow Metro station
- Owner: Moskovsky Metropoliten
- Line: Kaluzhsko-Rizhskaya line
- Platforms: 1
- Tracks: 2
- Connections: Trolleybus: 9, 48; Tram: A, 3, 39

Construction
- Depth: 49 metres (161 ft)
- Platform levels: 1
- Parking: No

Other information
- Station code: 095

History
- Opened: 5 January 1972; 54 years ago

Passengers
- 2002: 18,104,000

Services
Preceding station	Moscow Metro	Following station
Kitay-gorod towards Novoyasenevskaya	Kaluzhsko-Rizhskaya line	Sukharevskaya towards Medvedkovo
Lubyanka towards Potapovo	Sokolnicheskaya line transfer at Chistye Prudy	Krasnye Vorota towards Bulvar Rokossovskogo
Trubnaya towards Fiztekh	Lyublinsko-Dmitrovskaya line transfer at Sretensky Bulvar	Chkalovskaya towards Zyablikovo
Route map
Location
- Location within Central Moscow

Turgenevskaya (Russian: Турге́невская) is a station on the Kaluzhsko-Rizhskaya Line of the Moscow Metro.

== Name ==
It was named after Turgenevskaya Square, to which the entrances to the station lead; the square itself was named after a Russian novelist and playwright Ivan Turgenev.

== Design ==
The station was designed by Ivan Taranov, Yu. Vdovin, and I. Petukhova and opened on 5 January 1972. Turgenevskaya has simple white marble pylons which follow the curve of the station tube and a ceiling composed of reinforced plastic panels. Metal cornices run the length of the station along the base of the ceiling. The walls, which are faced with white and black marble, are decorated with chased brass panels by Kh. Rysin and D. Bodniek.

== Transfers ==
From this station, passengers can transfer to Sokolnicheskaya Line at Chistye Prudy station and to Lyublinsko-Dmitrovskaya Line at Sretensky Bulvar station.

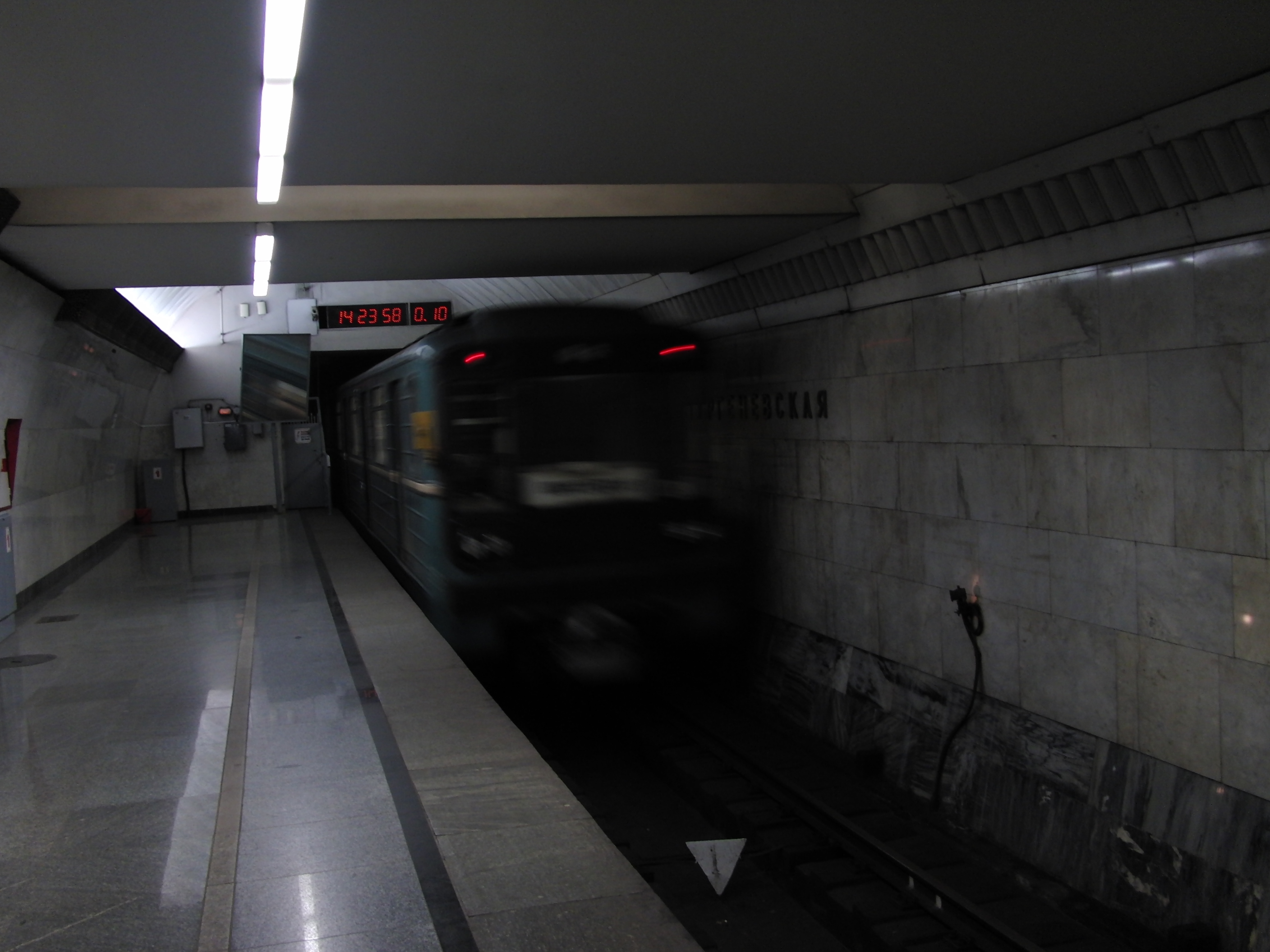
Departing train on the platform
