= Valeriy Lobanovskyi Dynamo Stadium =

Football stadium in Kyiv, Ukraine

Stadion Dynamo imeni Valeria Lobanovskoho
- Стадіон «Динамо» імені Валерія Лобановського
- Interactive map of Stadion Dynamo imeni Valeria Lobanovskoho
- Former names: Stadion Dynamo imeni Vsevoloda Balitskoho (1933–1934); Vse-Ukrayinskyi stadion Dynamo imeni Vsevoloda Balitskoho (1934–1936); Vse-Ukrayinskyi stadion Dynamo imeni Nikolaya Yezhova (1937–1939); Vse-Ukrayinskyi stadion Dynamo (1940–1941); Deutsches Stadion (1941–1943); Stadion Dynamo (1943–2002); Stadion Dynamo imeni Valeria Lobanovskoho (since 2002)
- Location: 3 Hrushevskyy st., Kyiv, Ukraine
- Coordinates: 50°27′01″N 30°32′07″E
- Owner: Dynamo Kyiv
- Capacity: 16,873 (football)
- Surface: Grass
- Field size: 100 m × 75 m (328 ft × 246 ft)

Construction
- Opened: 1933

Tenants
- Dynamo Kyiv (1934–present); Arsenal Kyiv (2005–2008, 2018–2019); Olimpik Donetsk (2015–2022); Ukraine (1992–present); Ukraine U-21 (1992–present)

Immovable Monument of Local Significance of Ukraine
- Official name: Комплекс стадіону "Динамо" ім. Лобановського (Complex of the Dynamo Stadium of Valeriy Lobanovskyi)
- Reference no.: 411-Кв

The Valeriy Lobanovskyi Dynamo Stadium (Ukrainian: Стадіон "Динамо" імені Валерія Лобановського) is a multi-functional stadium in Kyiv, Ukraine that is modified for football use only.

It is the home stadium of Dynamo Kyiv yet not the main stadium, for which Dynamo uses the bigger NSC Olympiyskiy. The Dynamo Stadium is also a major alternative stadium for the Ukraine national football team that often plays its exhibition games. The stadium holds 16,873 people, and was built in 1934 as Vsevolod Balitsky Dynamo Stadium by the project of Vasyl Osmak as the central stadium of the Ukrainian SSR Dynamo sports society associated with OGPU/NKVD. It was built in the park area next to the NKVD building which is today known as the Government building.

== History ==
The Dynamo Stadium was built in 1934 during transferring of the Soviet capital from Kharkiv to Kyiv. It was built near the newly erected building that was initially intended as a republican NKVD headquarters in Kyiv (today building of the Government of Ukraine).

The stadium current name was given in honour of the former Dynamo Kyiv and USSR national football team coach Valeriy Lobanovskyi in 2002, who died on 13 May that year, at age 63.

In January 2014, the square adjoining the stadium's main gate from Hrushevskoho Street became scene of the month-long street battle between attacking activists of the Euromaidan revolution and police. At several moments, the clashes took place immediately on top of the stadium gate, with at least one rioter filmed being thrown down at the pavement by police officers. The square, the entrance colonnade & stadium fence were completely smoked over by prolonged artificial tyres-fed fire, as well as surrounding street buildings. By 2015, the entrance square was completely restored. The only reminder of the revolution events is an amateur monument erected in the middle of the Hrushevskoho Street driveway opposite the stadium gate. In 2017, new seats were installed as the ground was chosen to host the final of the 2017–18 UEFA Women's Champions League.

== Monuments ==
In 1971, near the stadium was installed a monument of the Dynamo players involved in the game known in the Soviet historiography as the Death Match and the players who perished in the World War II. The sculpture is composed of steel, in which figures of four players are carved using high relief. The architects responsible for the sculpture, V. Bogdanovska and I. Maslenkov, are well known for designing stations of the Kyiv Metro. The sculptor was I. Gorovyi. The monument is located by the service entrance to the stadium, so many fans are unable to see it.

On 11 May 2003, before the first anniversary of the death of Valeriy Lobanovskyi, a monument was opened. The famous coach is sitting on the trainer's bench and is watching a match. The pedestal is a large ball. The total weight is about five tonnes. The monument was created by a group of nine people led by the architect Vasil Klimenko and the sculptor Vladimir Filatov. The sculpture is located between the stadium and the main entrance to the stadiums.

== Gallery ==
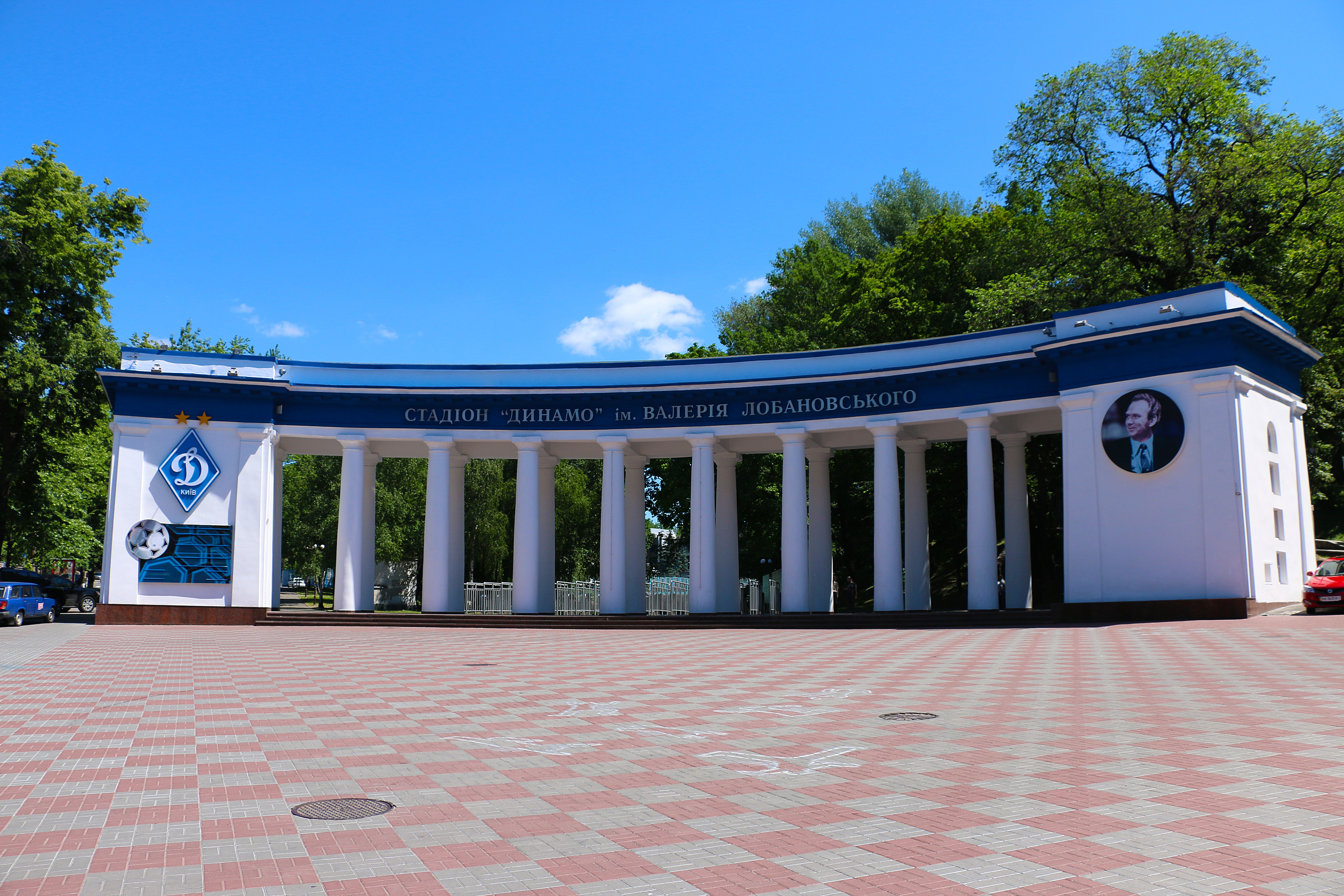
The stadium entrance

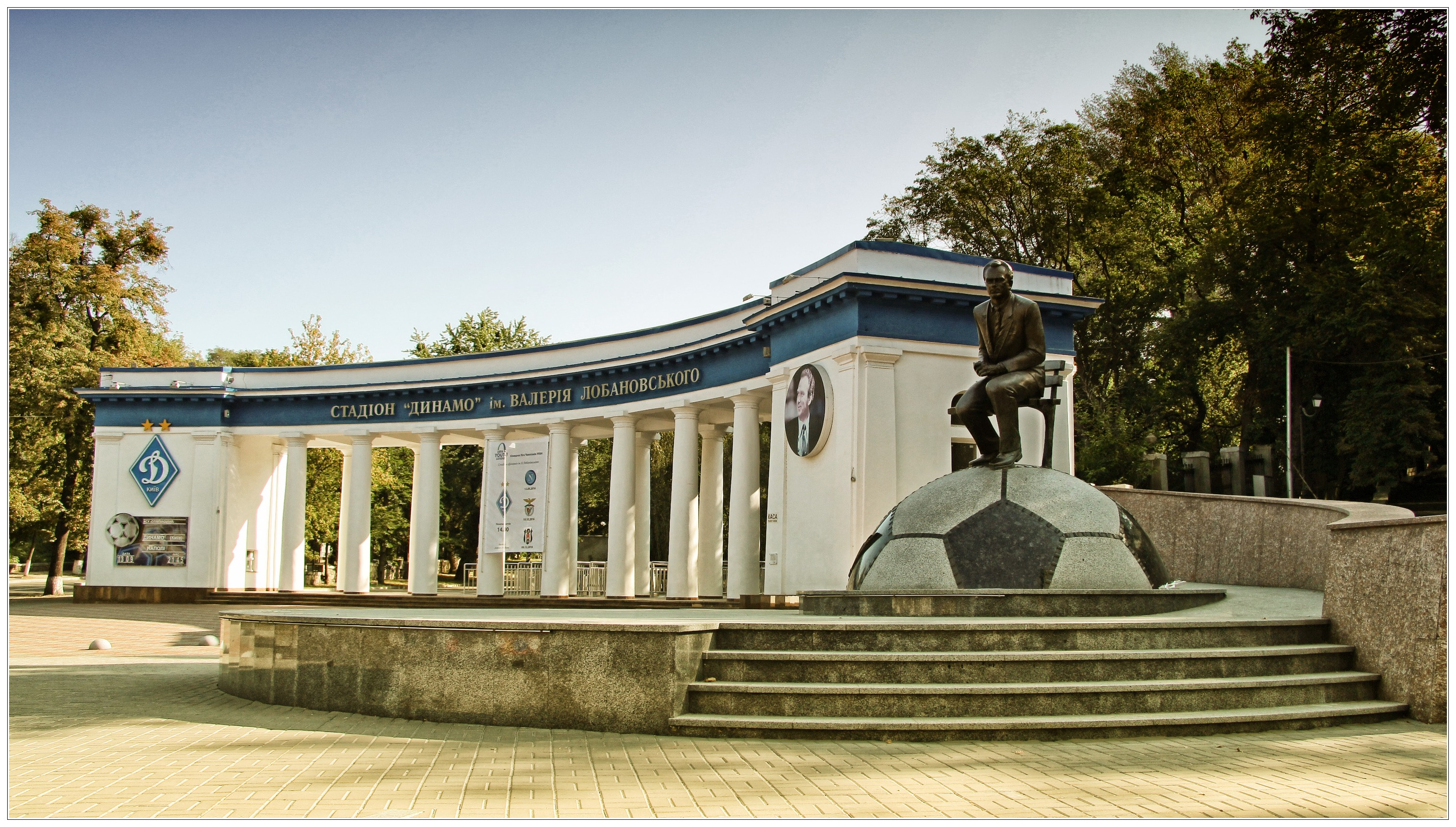
The entrance with a monument to Valeriy Lobanovskyi

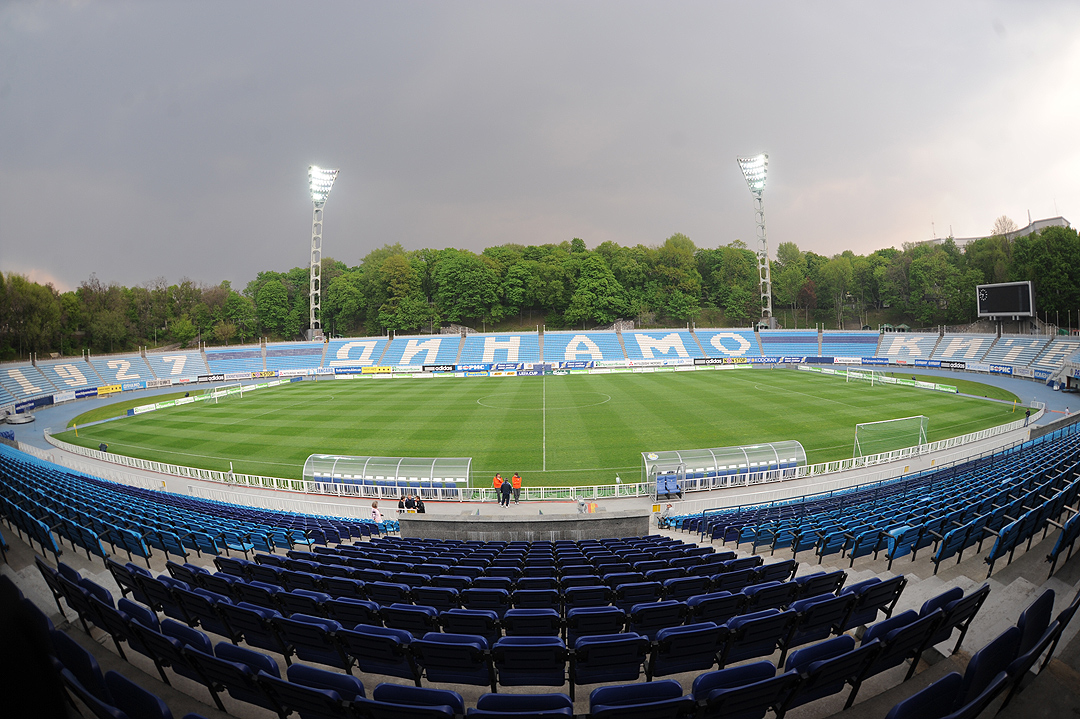
Stadium panorama (day)

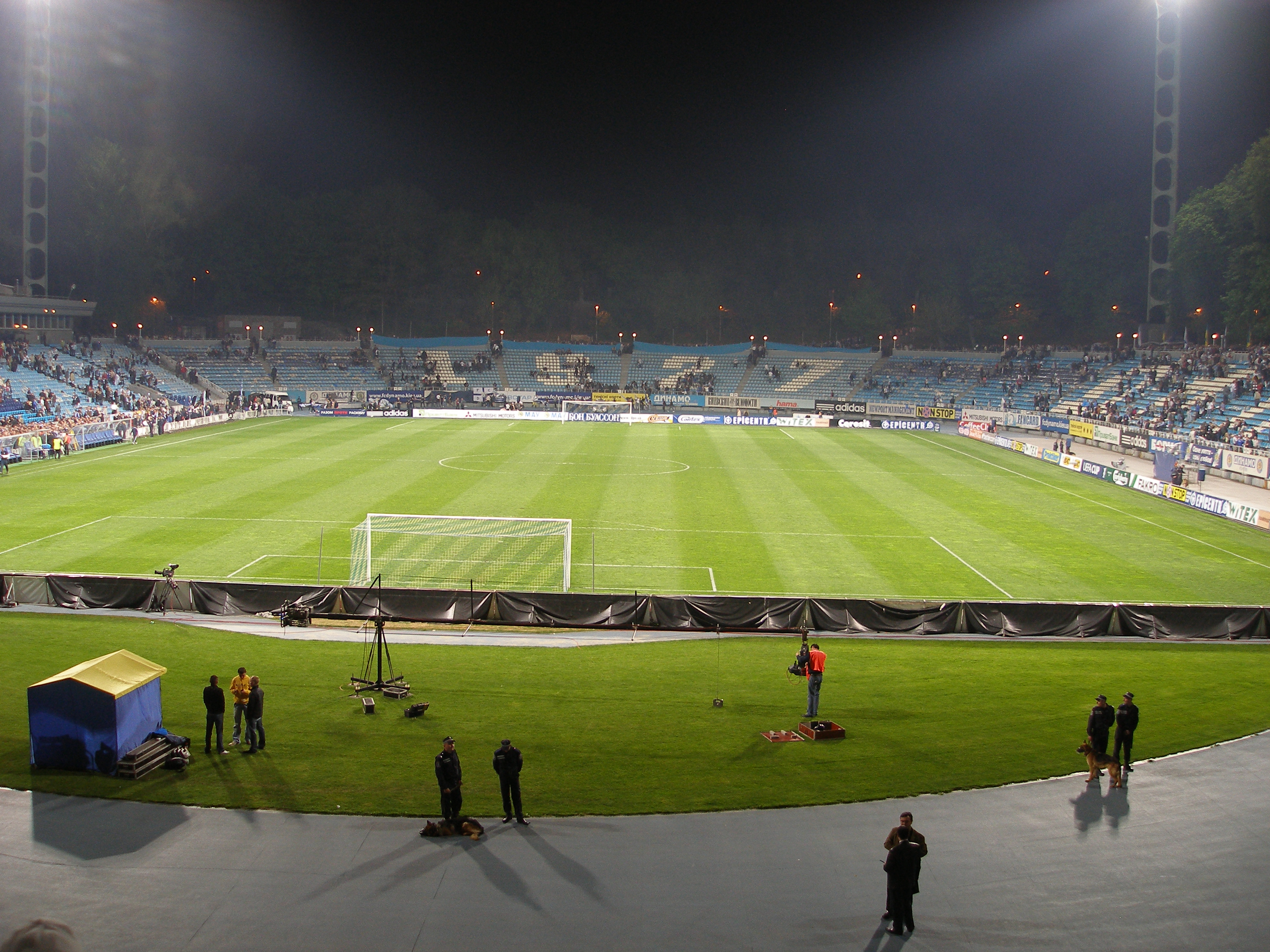
Stadium panorama (night)

== See also ==
- Dynamo FC
- Dynamo (Ukraine), Ukrainian fitness-sports association

Preceded by Cardiff City Stadium; Cardiff	UEFA Women's Champions League; Final venue 2018	Succeeded by Groupama Arena; Budapest
