= Krasnye Vorota =

Krasnye Vorota:

- Red Gate
- Krasnye Vorota square
- Krasnye Vorota (Moscow Metro)
- Krasnye Vorota (Kazan)
- Krasnye Vorota (Altai Krai)
