= Ivan Fomin =

Russian architect and educator

- Иван Фомин
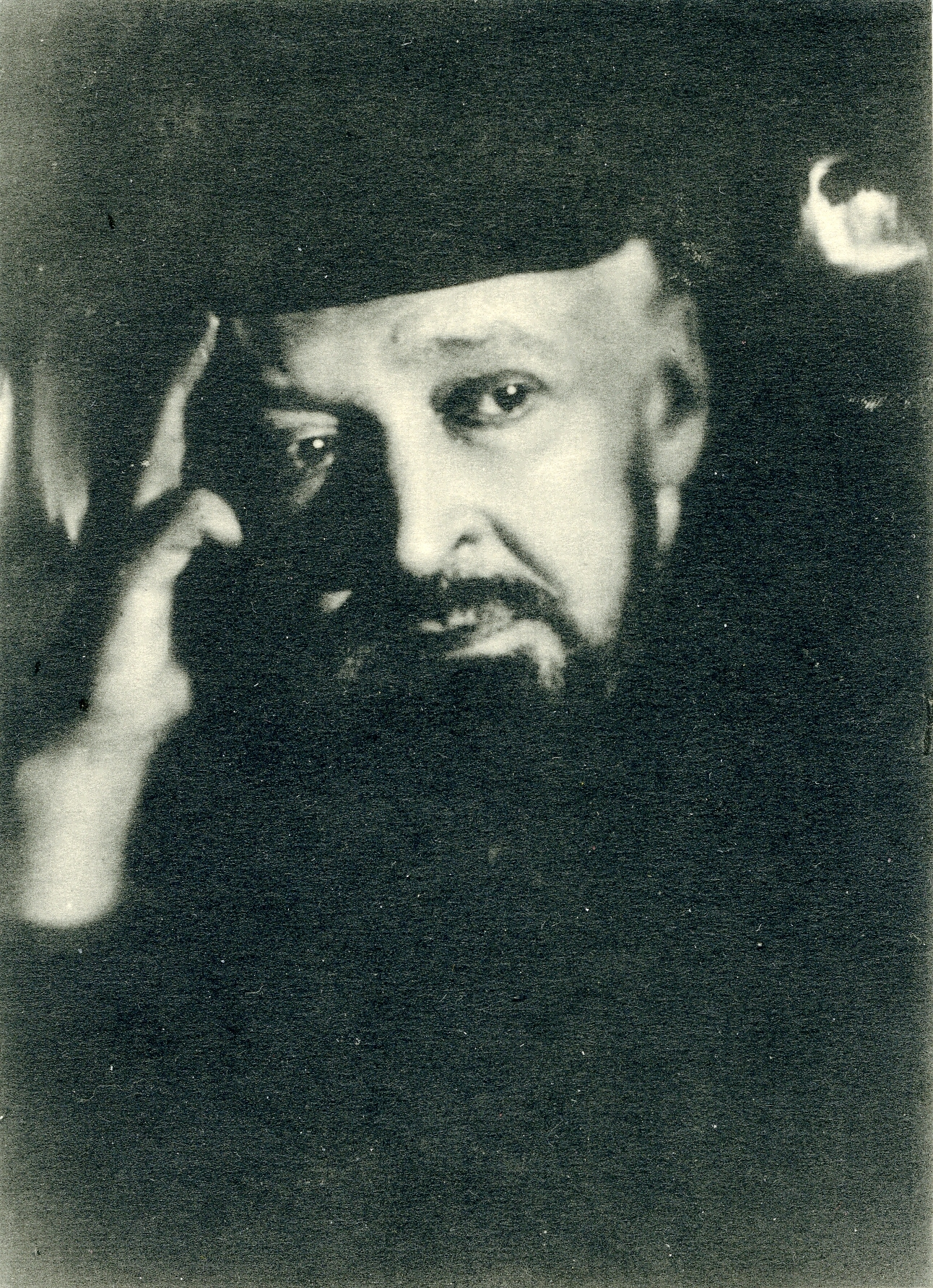
- Fomin in 1935
- Born: 3 February 1872; Oryol, Oryol Governorate, Russian Empire
- Died: 12 June 1936 (aged 64); Moscow, Russian SFSR, Soviet Union
- Occupation: Architect
- Buildings: Government of Ukraine, Kyiv; Krasnye Vorota station, Moscow Metro; Dynamo Building, Moscow
- Projects: Goloday Island redevelopment

Ivan Aleksandrovich Fomin (Russian: Иван Александрович Фомин; 3 February [O.S. 22 January] 1872 – 12 June 1936) was a Russian architect and educator. He began his career in 1899 in Moscow, working in the Art Nouveau style. After relocating to Saint Petersburg in 1905, he became an established master of the Neoclassical Revival movement. Following the Russian Revolution of 1917 Fomin developed a Soviet adaptation of Neoclassicism and became one of the key contributors to an early phase of Stalinist architecture known as postconstructivism.

== Early years ==
Born in Oryol, Fomin received a classical education at a high school in Riga, and studied mathematics at the Moscow University. In 1894, he joined the Imperial Academy of Arts in Saint Petersburg but was expelled in 1896 for political activities. After a year of studies in France, Fomin settled in Moscow and passed the tests for a contractor's license. He worked for Lev Kekushev and Fyodor Schechtel, two leading masters of Art Nouveau. Schechtel assigned him to Moscow Art Theatre project, which exposed Fomin to the public and eventually brought him his first own commissions.

== Art Nouveau (1899–1903) ==
Fomin's early style was related to Schekhtel's and Austrian Jugendstil. His first and most notable work was the Wilhelmina Reck mansion in Skatertny Lane. The building is loosely modeled after the Elvira Studio by August Endell (1896, destroyed 1944); instead of Endell's marine motifs, Fomin decorated his work with plaster flowers and majolica inserts. The same floral motifs were used in the iron gates. The building still stands, albeit rebuilt beyond recognition.

Fomin continued working for the Reck family, who sponsored Art Nouveau. In 1902–1903, he organized the "Exhibition of Art and Architecture of New Style", showcasing his works in interior design. Fomin contracted top-level furniture makers, foundries and ceramic plants for his own designs, but also displayed works by guests like Charles Rennie Mackintosh, Joseph Maria Olbrich, Koloman Moser and Russian artists. Fomin established himself as a promoter of Art Nouveau. However, his attempts to forge the new Architectural Society failed. In 1902, he set up the Construction College in Moscow, with a separate class for women.

== Neoclassicism (1903–1917) ==
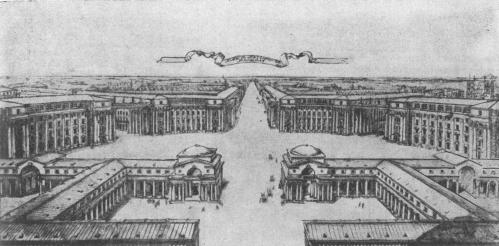
Novy Peterburg, perspective plan, 1912

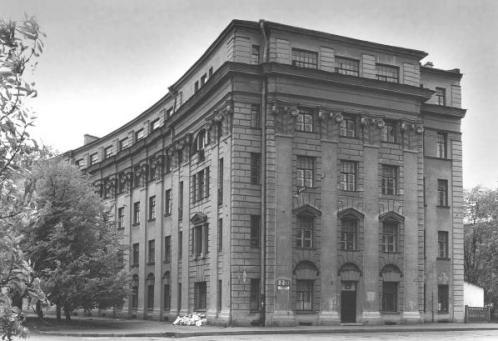
Novy Peterburg, completed building, 1914

Fomin acquired a solid reputation, but did not have an architect's license yet. He returned to St.Petersburg in 1905 and completed Leon Benois' course at the Academy of Arts in 1909, winning a one-year study tour to Greece, Egypt and Italy. At this time, Neoclassical Revival became the leading style in St. Petersburg, and the most technologically advanced. Banks and department stores, who favored the style, could afford a steel frame and concrete slab floors. A combination of money and technology allowed the mix of classical columns and arches with large glass surfaces.

Fomin's turn to Neoclassicism is traced to 1903, when he applied to the contest for Count Volkonsky estate with a neoclassical draft. In 1904, Fomin published his Revival Manifesto in Mir Iskusstva magazine, pledging to architectural legacy of Catherine and Alexander I. "These days, everyone wants to be individual, to invent his own, and in the end we cannot see neither a dominant style, nor a trace of those who can eventually create it". Fomin believed in a universal idea uniting everyone, and in an architectural style that could serve it. He promoted the academy's exhibitions in "History of Russian Art" (1909) and "History of Architecture" (1911), as vigorously as he did his Art Nouveau shows. Fomin was an outspoken advocate for building preservation, leading a campaign against the conversion of historical mansions into rental apartment buildings.

Fomin completed numerous interior renovations, and two new buildings (Polovtsov mansion, and Abamelek-Lazarev mansion ). His greatest urban projects of this time, interrupted by the outbreak of World War I, didn't materialize in full.

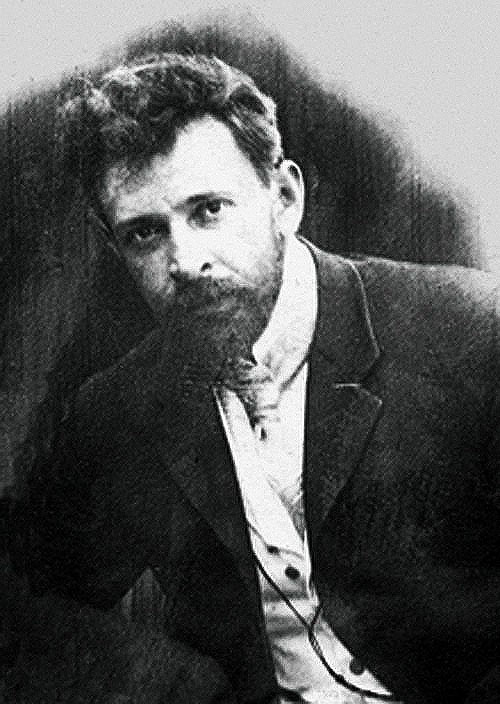
Fomin in 1915

Novy Peterburg (Goloday Island development) was a huge Palladian fantasy. In 1911 a British investment company led by Riccardo Gualino, launched a development project on a 1 square kilometer lot in the western Goloday Island, awarding general planning to Fomin. Building design was split between Fomin and Fyodor Lidval. Fomin wanted to recreate the monumental imperial classics in a middle class community. Only a fraction of his plan materialized before World War I. One building, a school on Kakhovsky Street, stands today.

== Revolutionary years (1918–1926) ==
In 1918, Fyodor Lidval left for Sweden. Fomin stayed in St. Petersburg.

The Russian Civil War stopped all new construction; the few architectural jobs concentrated in monumental propaganda and city planning. Fomin managed to secure the chair of Petrograd (St.Petersburg) Zoning commission, and designed the Field of Mars landscape (1920–1923).

Fomin trained a new generation of architects at VKhUTEMAS/VKhuTEIN, at the same time developing his own concept of proletarian classicism. He asserted that a universal architecture must borrow essential principles from classicism, but the details of classicism are not important. As a result, the new architectural order can be simplified to a laconic set of basic elements, not bound by strict proportions. In practice, like all theories, it worked for good architects (like Fomin himself) but could not help mediocre imitators.

== The last ten years (1926–1936) ==
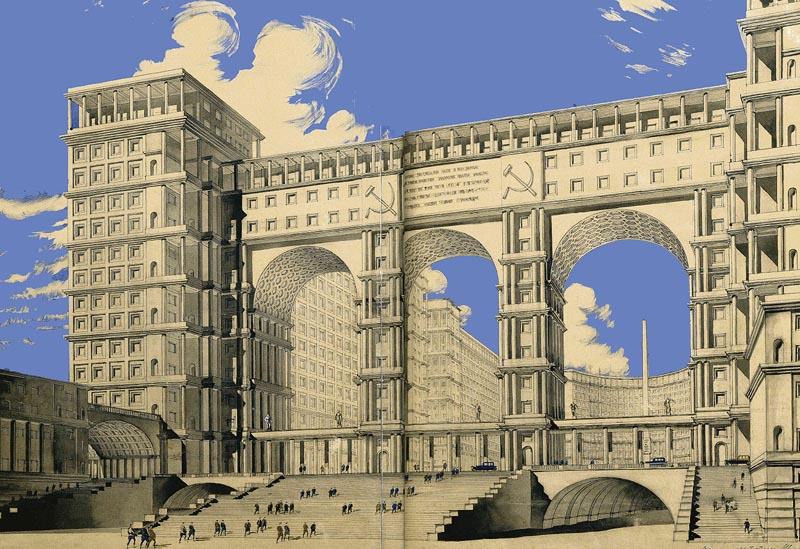
Narkomtiazhprom contest entry, 1934

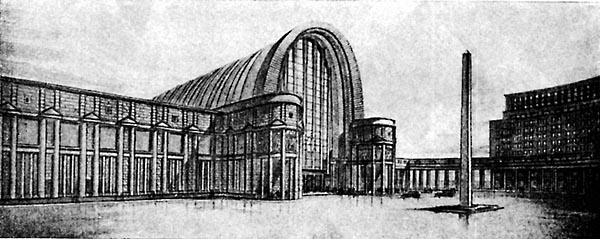
Kursky rail terminal contest entry, 1933

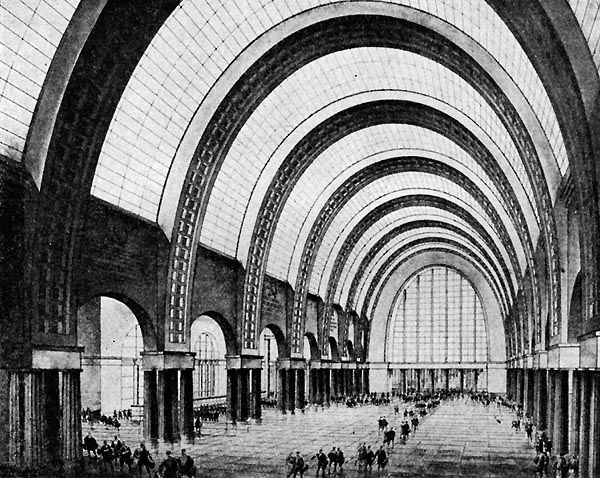
Kursky rail terminal, main concourse – contest entry, 1933

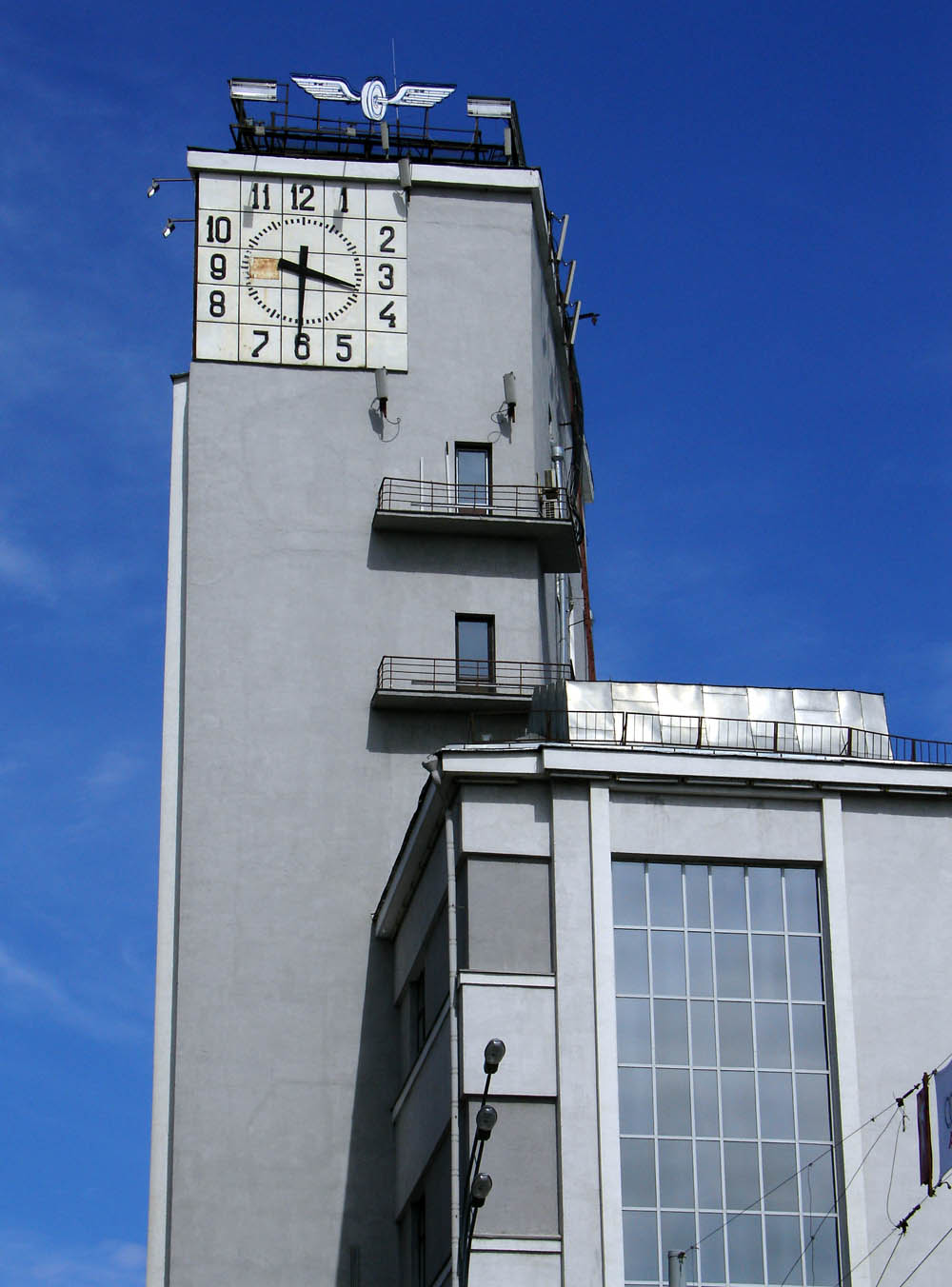
Ministry of Railways (Tank Engine Building) was Fomin's experiment with constructivist architecture, 1930

In 1929, Fomin relocated to Moscow. There, he completed the Dynamo building, an experiment halfway between modern art and his own neoclassicism. The building, using steel frame and concrete slab floors, looks like an industrial object, but the paired columns, Fomin's trademark, give away its classical origin. In 1933, when all Moscow architects were assigned to 20 Mossovet workshops, Fomin is appointed to lead Design Workshop No.3. Here, he designed his three last projects (two will be completed after his death).

According to Selim Khan-Magomedov, Fomin was one of the two forerunners of so-called postconstructivism, an early stage of Stalinist architecture (the other was Ilya Golosov). Postconstructivism is defined as classical shapes without classical details, an attempt to reinvent new styling to replace classical order. Fomin eventually disposed with it in favor of true neoclassicism (as did all Stalinist architecture).

Fomin took part in all of the major architectural contests of his time:

- 1932-1934 Kursky Rail Terminal
- 1932-1933 Palace of Soviets
- 1934 Narkomtiazhprom
- 1934 Moscow Metro first stage.

He did win and completed one of the Metro jobs. Palace of Soviets was won by Boris Iofan, construction began with enormous publicity but was terminated by German attack of 1941. His other two contests did not get beyond concept drafts.

Unlike Ivan Zholtovsky, who abstained from the lowly work on subway stations, Fomin eagerly joined the contest for the Metro. He competed on the Krasniye Vorota (Red Gates) against former constructivist Ilya Golosov, whose entry appeared to be a true Doric Greek classic. Unfortunately for Golosov, extremely hard geological conditions required heavy, wide support pylons. His otherwise fine draft was not feasible for 1935 technology, giving way to Fomin's simple red granite design – a tribute to the old Red Gates, demolished in 1932. This station opened to public in 1935, while Fomin was alive. He designed one more station, Teatralnaya (then Ploschad Sverdlova), which was completed two years after his death.

His last project on the ground, Government of Ukraine building in Kyiv, was approved for construction in 1934. This 10-story building, the earliest example of true Stalin's Empire Style, was hailed as the way to build and spawned numerous imitations. A peculiar feature is the quilt-like ornament on the columns. Fomin knew very well that a 25-meter bare column will look unnatural; the quilt warms up an otherwise dull shape. Column capitals also differ from their Corynthian prototypes: at this height, he reasoned, fine Greek details would be lost, so he simplified and enlarged leaves of his ornament.

== Legacy ==
Fomin died of a sudden stroke in 1936 and was interred at Novodevichye Cemetery; Teatralnaya and Government of Ukraine were completed by other architects. After World War II, the Government of Ukraine building became a staple of Soviet textbooks on architecture, a model of Stalin's Empire.

Fomin's son, Igor Ivanovich Fomin (born 1904) also became an architect, working primarily in Saint Petersburg. A constructivist in his twenties, he later completed various Stalinist projects like Schemilovka residential district and Ploschad Vosstania metro station. Similarity of initials (I.I. Fomin vs. I.A. Fomin) frequently confuses journalists.

Fomin's Moscow studio and museum (at the back alley of Prospect Mira, 52, where he had lived in apartment 43) was slated for demolition by the City of Moscow in summer of 2006; preservationists are struggling to save the memorial building.

== Buildings ==
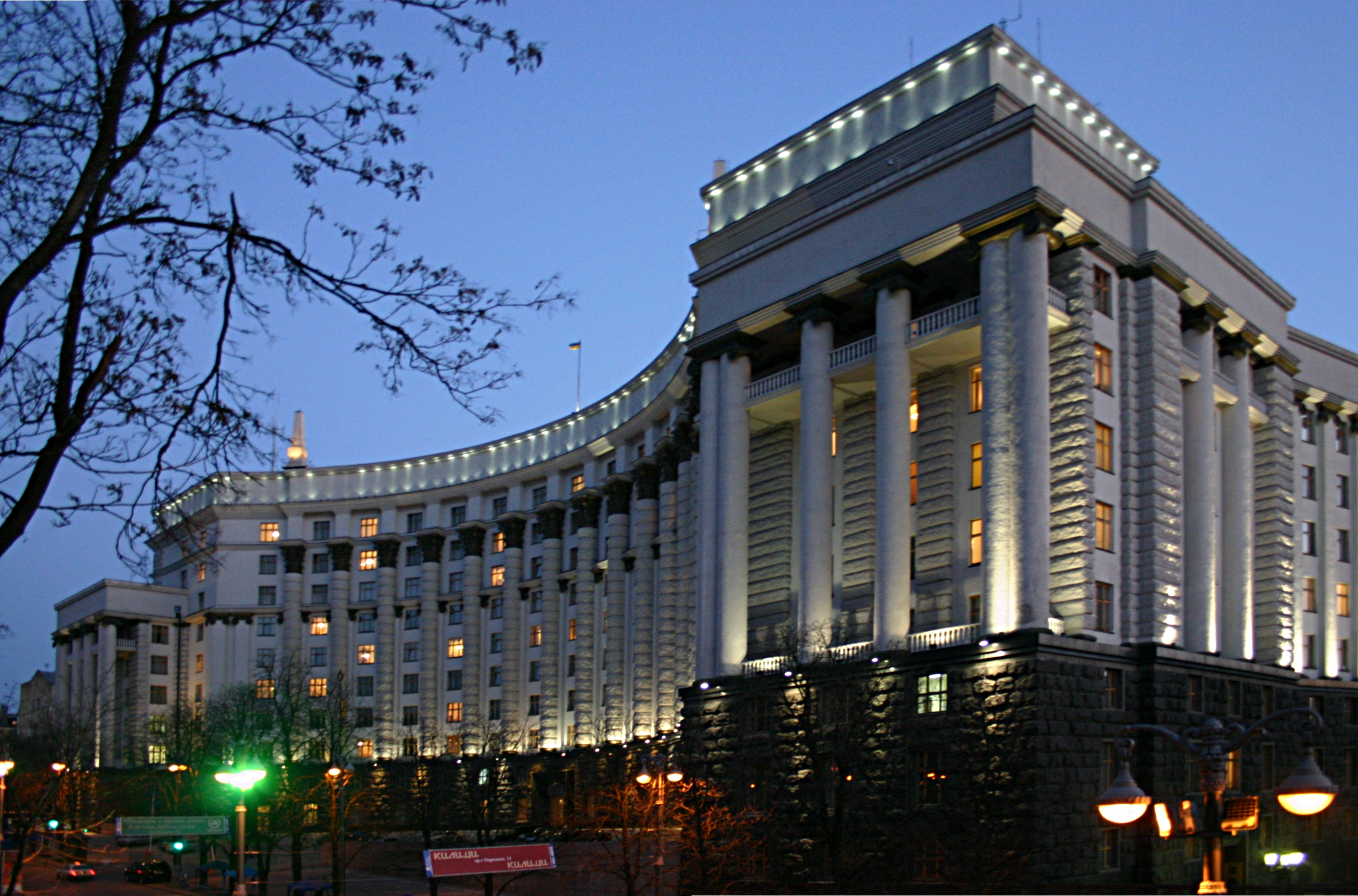
Government of Ukraine, Kyiv

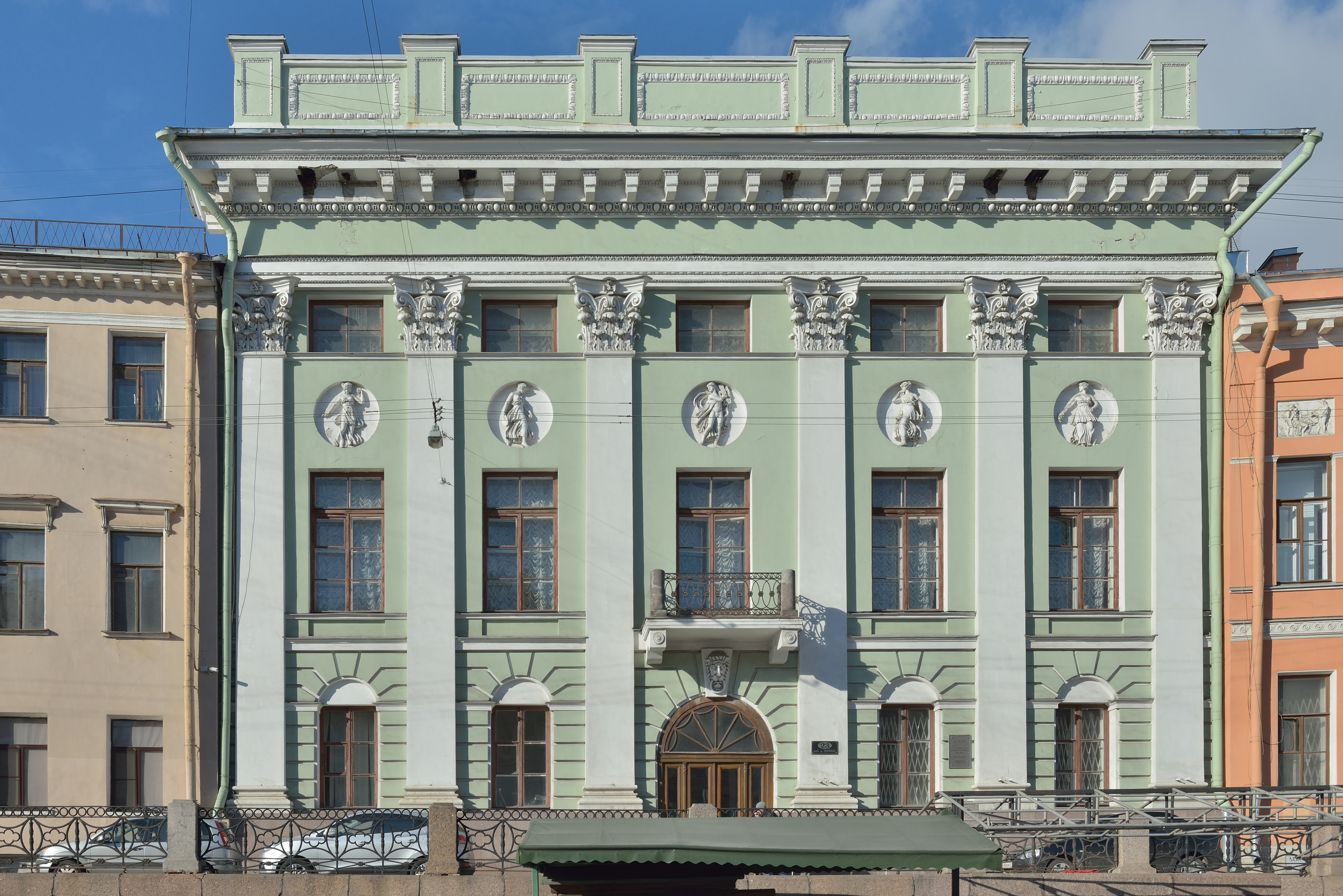
House of Prince S. Abamelek-Lazarev View from the Moyka River in Saint Petersburg.

- 1900 Wilhelmina Reck Mansion (Moscow, Skatertny Lane, 25)
- 1900-1902 Moscow Art Theater (Apprentice under Schekhtel)
- 1909-1911 Shakhovskaya Mansion, interiors (Saint Petersburg, Fontanka embankment, 27)
- 1910 Gagarin family Kholomki estate, Pskov Oblast
- 1911-1913 Polovtzov Mansion (Saint Petersburg, Srednei Nevki Embankment, 6)
- 1911-1914 Novy Peterburg (Golodai Island development), concept, planning, lead architect
- 1912 Novy Peterburg apartment building (Kakhovsky Lane, 10)
- 1912-1914 Novy Peterburg apartment building (Kakhovsky Lane, 2, completed 1927)
- 1912 Leonid Matsievich tomb (Saint Petersburg, Alexander Nevsky Lavra)
- 1912 Ratkov-Rozhnov building, interiors (Saint Petersburg, Dvortzovaya Embankment, 8)
- 1912-1913 Ratkov-Rozhnov mansion, interiors (Saint Petersburg, Moika Embankment, 86)
- 1912-1913 Golubev mansion, interiors (Saint Petersburg, Bolshoy Prospect, 10)
- 1913 Neidgardt mansion, interiors (Saint Petersburg, Zacharievskaya, 31)
- 1913-1914 Vorontsov-Dashkov mansion, interiors (Saint Petersburg, Mokhovaya 10)
- 1913-1914 Abamelek-Lazarev mansion (Saint Petersburg, Moika Embankment, 23)
- 1914 Portal, "Cafe de Paris", (Saint Petersburg, Bolshaya Morskaya 16)
- 1913 Obelisks and lanterns, Lomonosov Bridge (Saint Petersburg)
- 1920-1923 Field of Mars garden landscaping, Saint Petersburg
- 1927 Udarnik Sanatorium (Zheleznovodsk)
- 1929 Chemical Institute (Ivanovo, concept, realized by A.I.Pavin 1930–1937, photograph)
- 1928-1930 Dynamo Building (Moscow, Lubyanka Street)
- 1929-1930 Moscow City Hall Building (Tverskaya Street, Moscow)
- 1930 Own studio building (Moscow, Prospect Mira, 52)
- 1930 Commissariat of Railways (Дом МПС, Дом-Паровоз – The Tank Engine Building) (Moscow)
- 1933-1936 Clinic for the Comissarian of Railways (Moscow, Basmannaya, ru_sovarch blog)
- 1935 Krasniye Vorota station, Moscow Metro
- 1934-1936 Government of Ukraine building (Kyiv, completed 1938 by P.V. Abrosimov))
- 1936 Teatralnaya station, Moscow Metro (completed 1938)
