= Government Building, Kyiv =

Administrative building for the Ukrainian government

Government Building
- Будинок Уряду
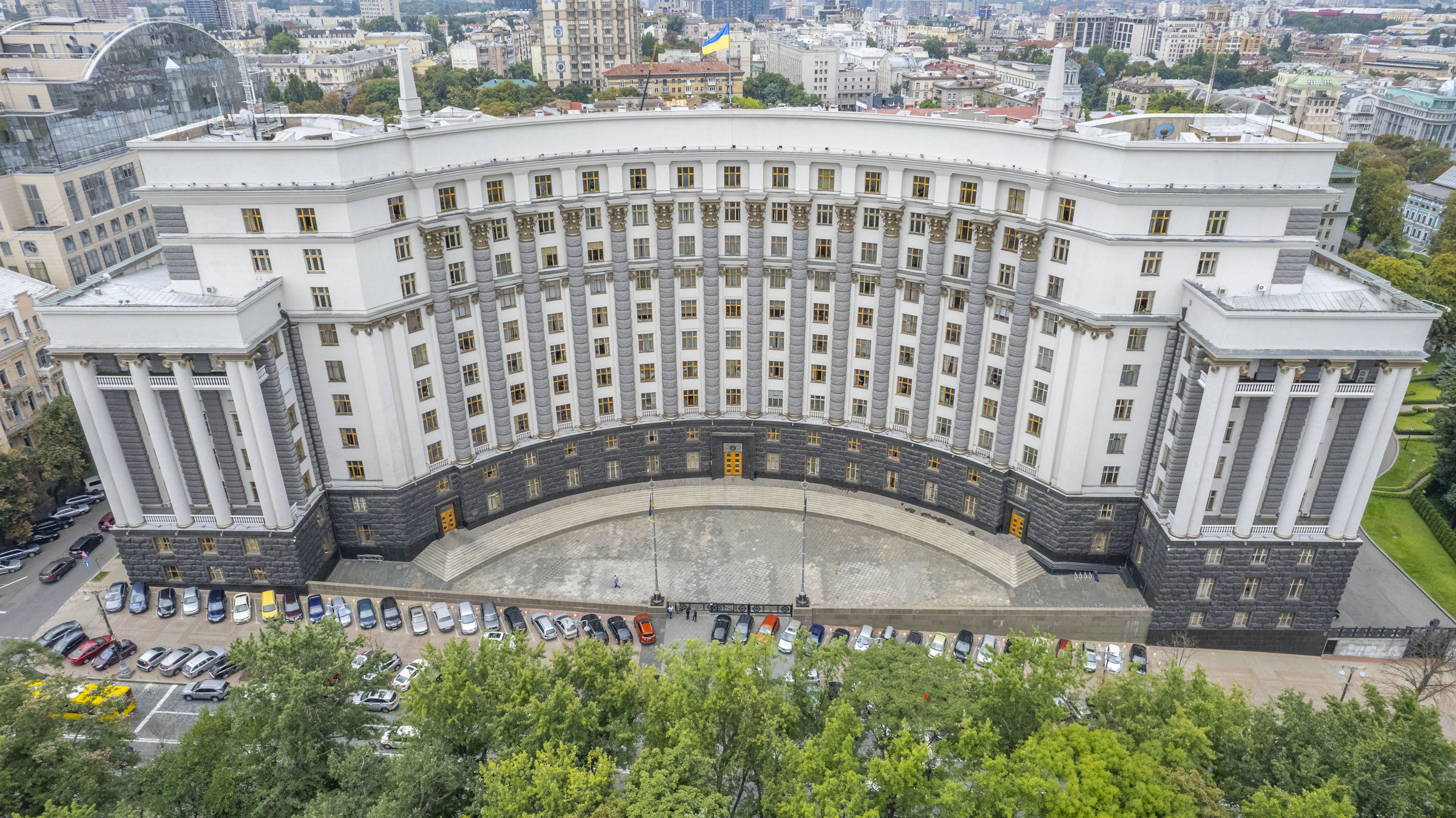
- The main façade
- Interactive map of the Government Building area

General information
- Location: Lypky neighborhood, 12/2 Hrushevsky Street, Kyiv, Ukraine
- Coordinates: 50°26′52.0″N 30°32′1.4″E
- Current tenants: Government of Ukraine
- Construction started: 1936
- Completed: 1938
- Renovated: 2007
- Client: Cabinet of Ministers
- Owner: State, government

Height
- Height: 35 metres (115 ft)

Technical details
- Floor count: 10 (main); 7 or 8 (sides)

Design and construction
- Architects: Ivan Fomin (Pavlo Abrosymov)

Website
- Official website

Ukrainian Government Building (Ukrainian: Будинок Уряду, romanized: Budynok Uriadu) is located in the center of Kyiv on Hrushevsky Street in the vicinity of Verkhovna Rada building. It serves as the administrative building for the Cabinet of Ministers of Ukraine. From 1941 to 1954 the building was the tallest building in the city. On 7 September 2025, the building was hit by a Russian UAV during the Russian invasion of Ukraine.

== Description ==
The structure was built in 1936–1938 based on design of architect Ivan Fomin and—partially—architect Pavel Abrosimov. The main half-circled facade of the building is opened towards Hrushevskyi Street. It is equally partitioned by tall columns of Corinthian order, capitals and bases of which are 2.5 metres (8.2 ft) tall and made out of cast iron. The lower stories of the building are faced with big uncut blocks of a Tulchyn labradorite, while socle and portals with a polished granite. Alloy metal flagpoles and decorated gates were made in 1947.

== Current location ==
The building was first designed on the demand of the People's Commissariat of Internal Affairs (NKVD), while the government was supposed to be located in the building that today is occupied by the Ministry of Foreign Affairs of Ukraine at Saint Michael's Square. However, construction plans were changed and refused for the building to be located in Upper City neighborhood (Old Kyiv). Decision to change location has been made because the Government Building together with National Bank of Ukraine and Cabinet of Ministers Club headquarters compose a shared court with access to Anti-Air Defense safety bunker. Rumors also mention that use of the tunnels may lead to from the Verkhovna Rada building and the building of President's Secretariat. Therefore, all these institutions compactly moved to Lypky neighborhood not accidentally.

== Previous locations ==
- Derzhprom Complex
- Kharkiv Arts Museum
