= Chistye Prudy (Moscow Metro) =

Moscow Metro station

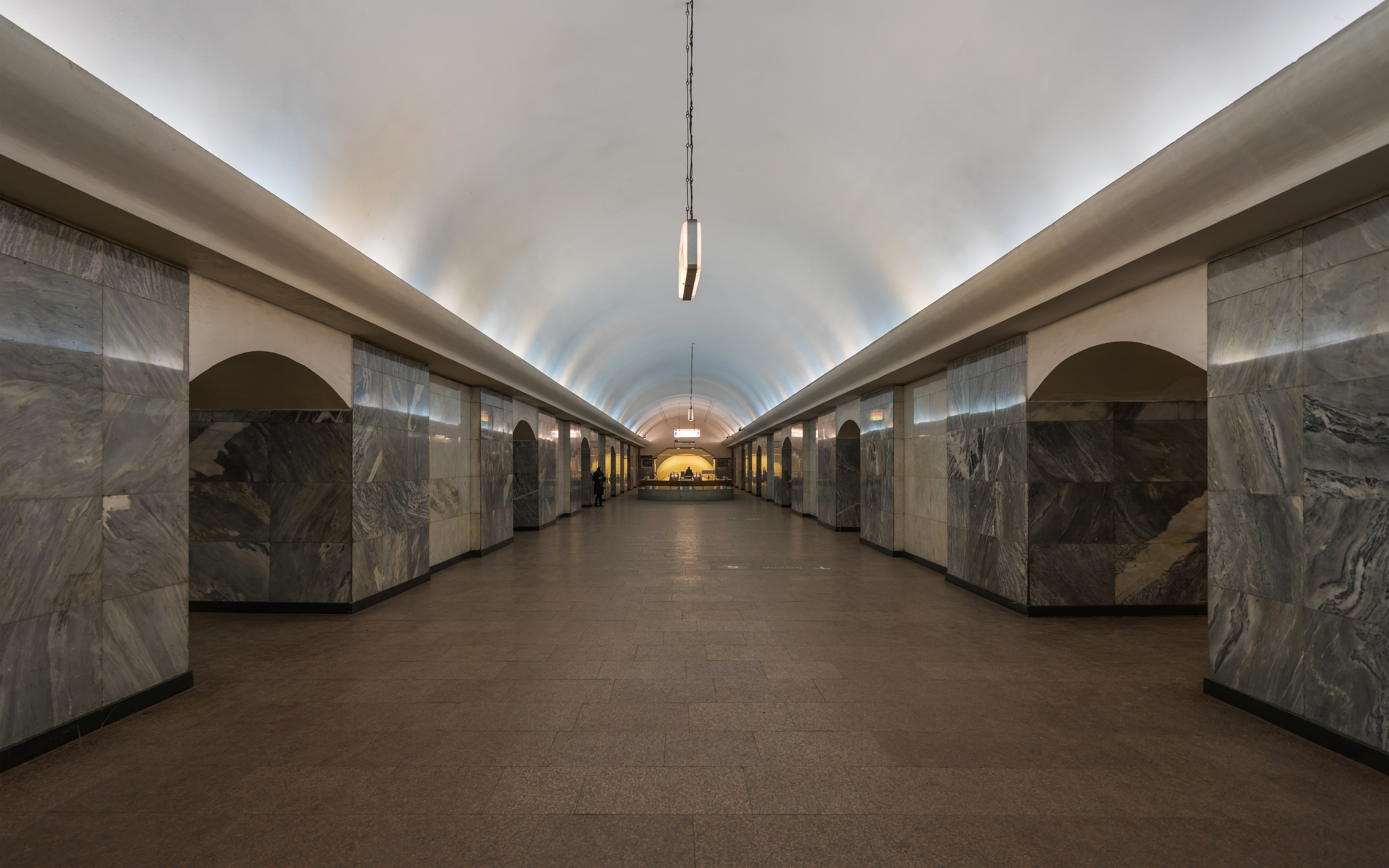

General information
- Location: Basmanny District; Central Administrative Okrug; Moscow; Russia
- Coordinates: 55.7657°N 37.6388°E
- System: Moscow Metro station
- Owner: Moskovsky Metropoliten
- Line: Sokolnicheskaya line
- Platforms: 1 island platform
- Tracks: 2
- Connections: Tram: A, 3, 39, Bus: 122

Construction
- Structure type: Deep pylon tri-vault
- Depth: 35 metres (115 ft)
- Platform levels: 1
- Parking: No
- Cycle facilities: No

Other information
- Station code: 008

History
- Opened: 15 May 1935; 91 years ago
- Former names: Kirovskaya (1935-1990)

Passengers
- 2009: 11,736,210

Services
Preceding station	Moscow Metro	Following station
Lubyanka towards Potapovo	Sokolnicheskaya line	Krasnye Vorota towards Bulvar Rokossovskogo
Kitay-gorod towards Novoyasenevskaya	Kaluzhsko-Rizhskaya line transfer at Turgenevskaya	Sukharevskaya towards Medvedkovo
Trubnaya towards Fiztekh	Lyublinsko-Dmitrovskaya line transfer at Sretensky Bulvar	Chkalovskaya towards Zyablikovo
Route map
Location
- Location within Central Moscow

Chistye Prudy (Russian: Чистые пруды, English: Clean Ponds) is a Moscow Metro station in the Basmanny District, Central Administrative Okrug, Moscow. It is on the Sokolnicheskaya Line, between Lubyanka and Krasnye Vorota stations. Chistye Prudy was opened on 15 May 1935 as a part of the first segment of the Metro. The station lies beneath Myasnitskaya Street, close to Turgenevskaya Square and the Clean Ponds, after which the station was named. It was the deepest station in Moscow Metro from 1935 until 1938.

== History and design ==
Though planned to be a three-vaulted station with a full-length central hall (similar to Krasnye Vorota and Okhotny Ryad), Chistye Prudy was built instead according to a London Underground type design with two passages at either end of the station connecting the platforms. The outer platform vaults were finished to give the impression that a central hall did in fact exist, with what appeared to be a row of dark marble pylons. However, all of the archways except those at either end of the platform were barricaded. The architect of the initial station was Nikolai Kolli who worked with Le Corbusier on the nearby Tsentrosoyuz building.

During World War II the station was closed and its platforms were fenced off with plywood for use as the headquarters of the Joint Staff and PVO Air Defence. All trains bypassed this station. Chistye Prudy's central hall was built in 1971 so that the station could become a transfer point to the Kaluzhsko-Rizhskaya Line. The architects for this project were N. Shukhareva, L. Popov, and A. Fokina. The new portion of the station was finished to resemble the original sections as closely as possible, maintaining its original character. Escalators were built in the centre of the platform to connect to Turgenevskaya.

Chistye Prudy is finished with dark grey Ufalei and white Koelga marble, with a dark granite platform. In 1989 the station's outer walls were refinished with marble rather than ceramic tile to approximate the original design even more closely.

The station was named Kirovskaya from its opening until 1990, and there is still a bronze bust of Sergey Kirov at the end of the platform. In 1992 it was briefly called Myasnitskaya, but renamed a few days later into its current name.

== Entrance and transfers ==
The station retains its original entrance, a glazed art deco pavilion, situated at start of the Chistoprudny boulevard with entrances from both sides: to the ponds on the boulevard and towards the Myasnitskiye Vorota square.

The pavilion links up to the subterranean vestibule and ticket hall. During the reconstruction in 1971, a subway was built directly linking the underground space with the new network of entrances for the Turgenevskaya station, which makes it possible to walk from one station vestibule to the other without descending into the platform halls.

The original 3 N-type escalators were replaced in 1995 by ET-3M models (30 metres high {98 ft}), during which the pavilion and vestibule underwent renovation.

The station's transfer to Turgenevskaya of the Kaluzhsko-Rizhskaya Line is done via a tunnel that begins underneath Chisye Prudy's platform. Access to which is gained by two sets of two 9.4 metre (30 ft) high LT-5 escalators (northern - ascent, southern - descent), opened 5 January 1972. Transfer to the Sretensky Bulvar station of the Lyublinsko-Dmitrovskaya Line, opened on 13 January 2008, is accomplished by 3 E-25T escalators (23.8 metre high {78 ft}) which begin at the northern end of the central hall and descend into the newer station.

== Station surroundings ==
The name "Chistye Prudy" also refers to the neighborhood surrounding the Metro station. This area is sometimes called Chistye Prudy or Pokrovka (referring to the street by the same name). In the 16th century, Pokrovskye Vorota (Pokrov Gates) stood at the current intersection of Pokrovka Street and Chistoprudny Boulevard.

The Chistye Prudy neighborhood is famous for the beautiful Chistoprudny Boulevard and the pond after which the area is called—Chisty Prud (Clean Pond). In medieval times, several ponds stood on the location of the current single pond. They were used as refuse dumps and were fittingly called Griyaznye Prudy (Dirty Ponds). Under Peter the Great's reign, his friend and advisor Menshikov dredged the ponds, unified them into one pond and renamed them Chistye Prudy (Clean Ponds).

There is the only tram line in Moscow Center near there. Namely, route 39 tram starts from Chistye Prudy station's area and allows to ride near several landmarks of Moscow's city centre in one go.

== Gallery ==
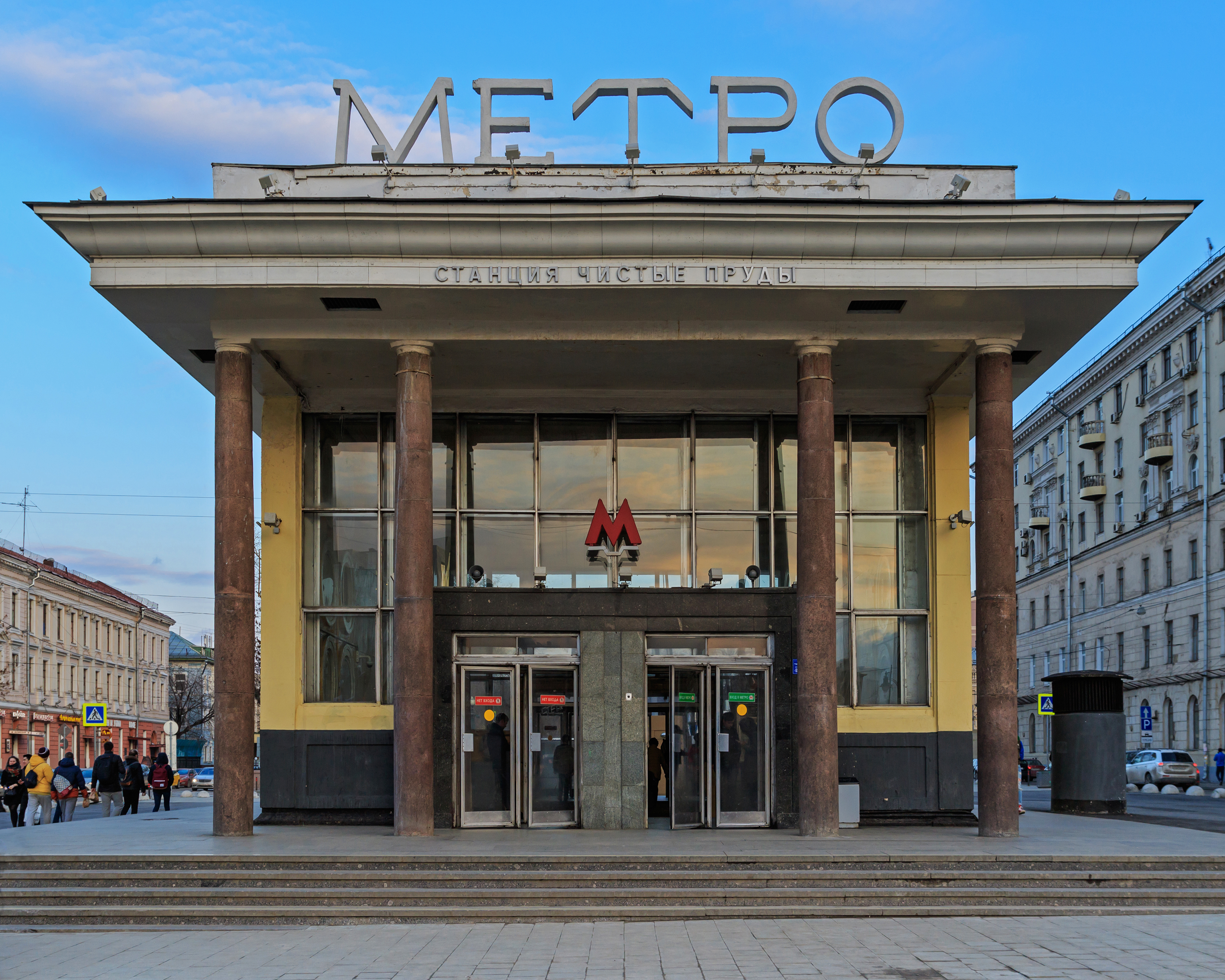
Station vestibule

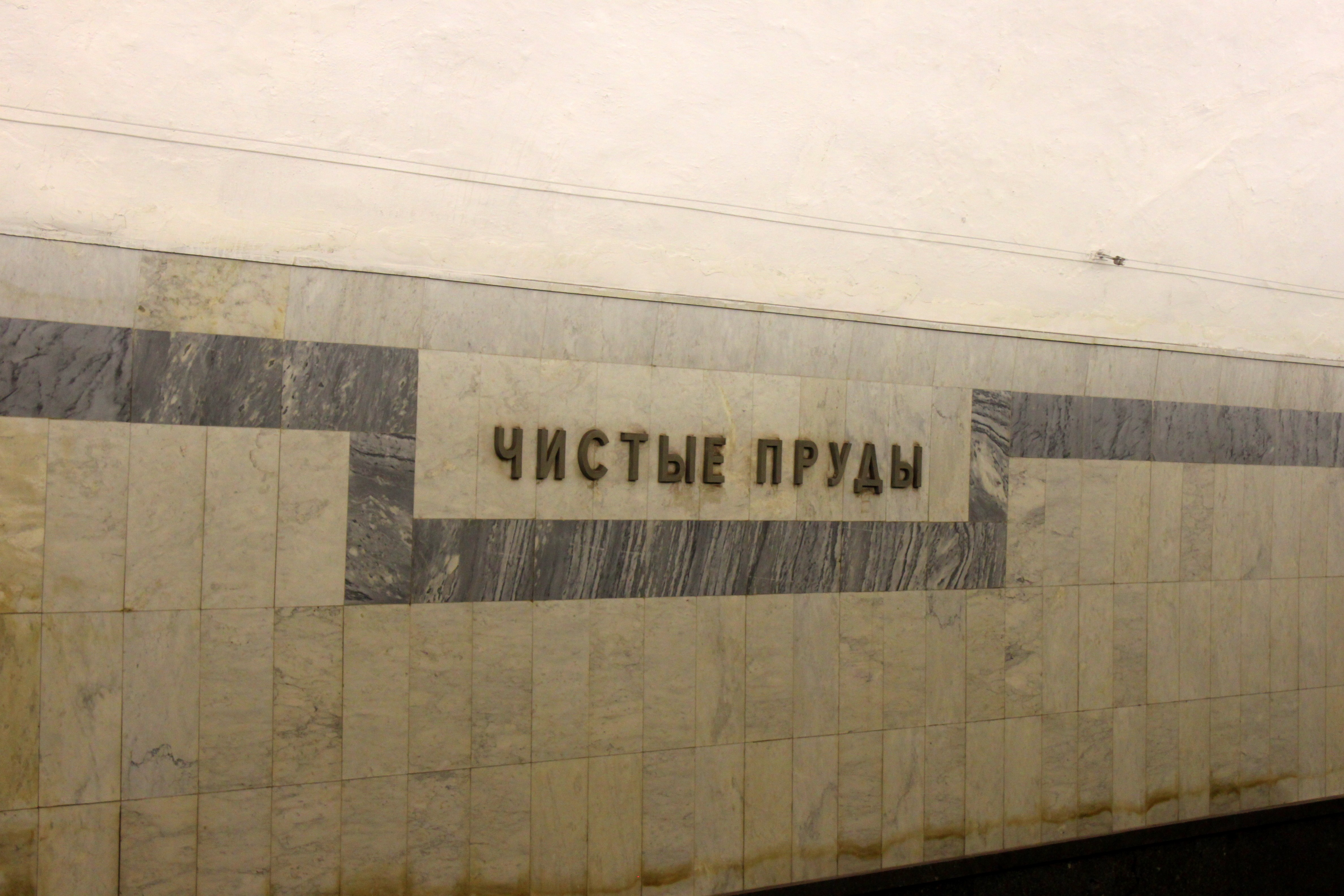
Platform artwork

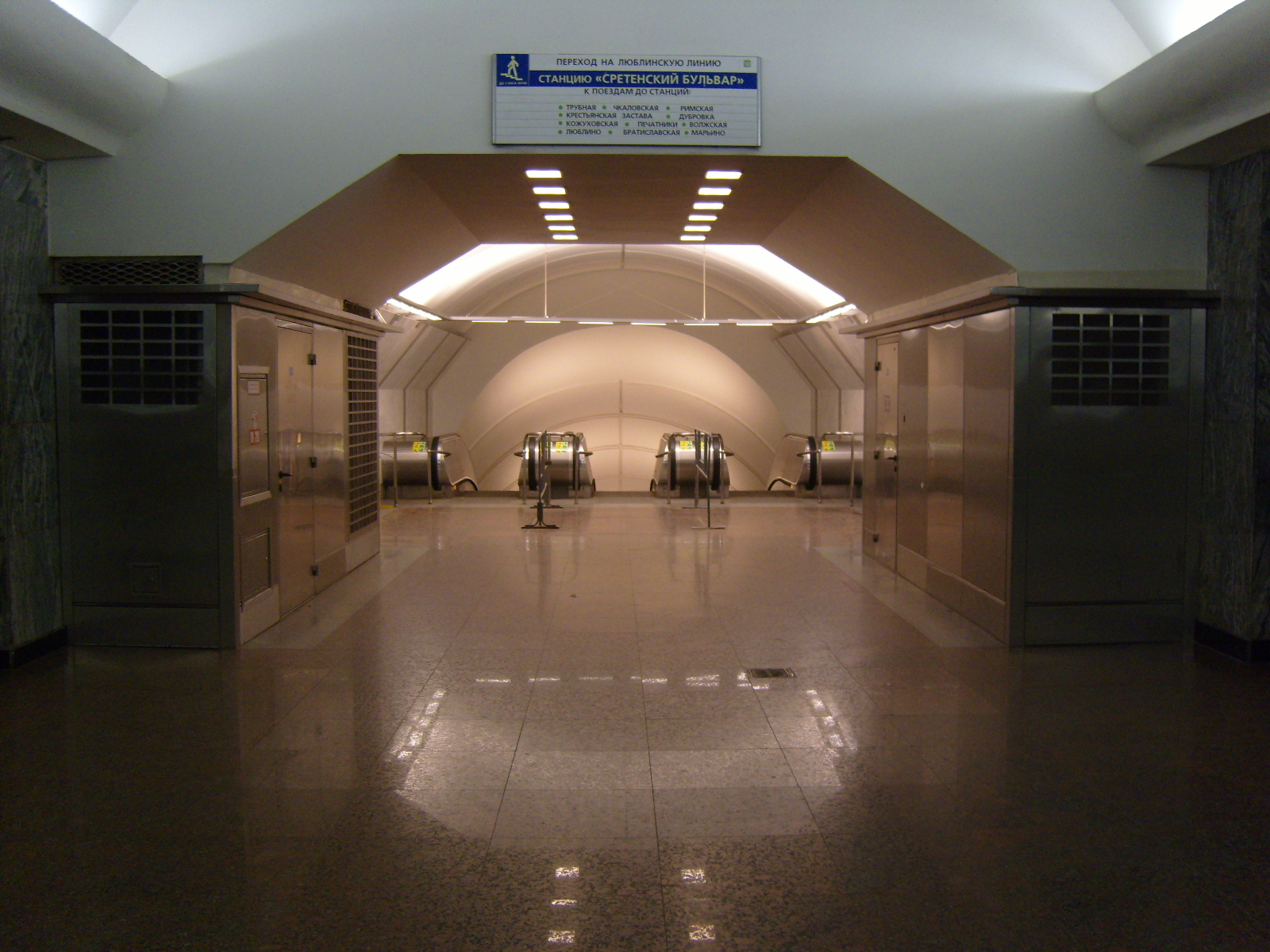
Escalators leading down to Sretensky Bulvar on the Lyublinsko-Dmitrovskaya Line

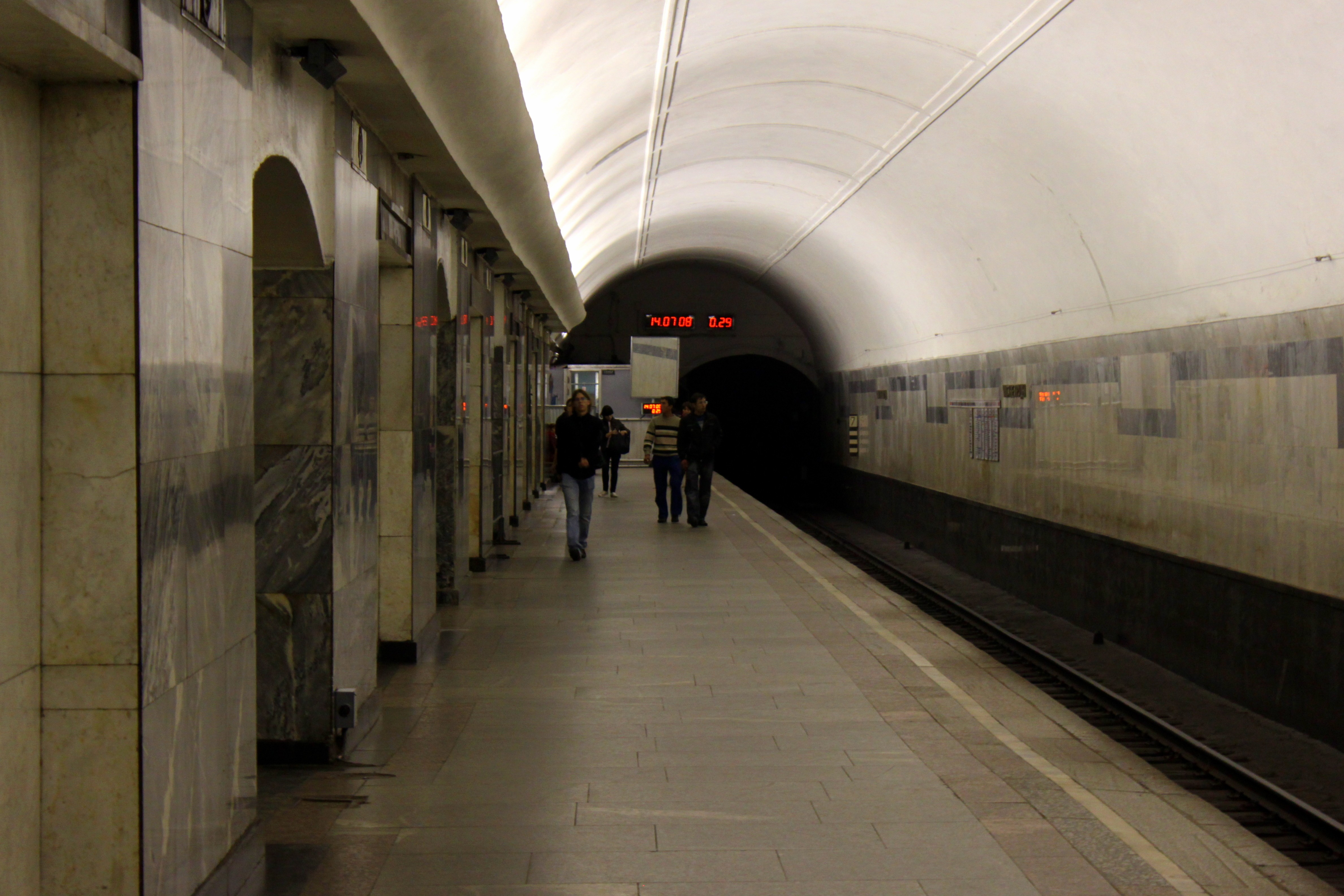
Station platform with clocks
