= Krasnye Vorota (Moscow Metro) =

Moscow Metro station

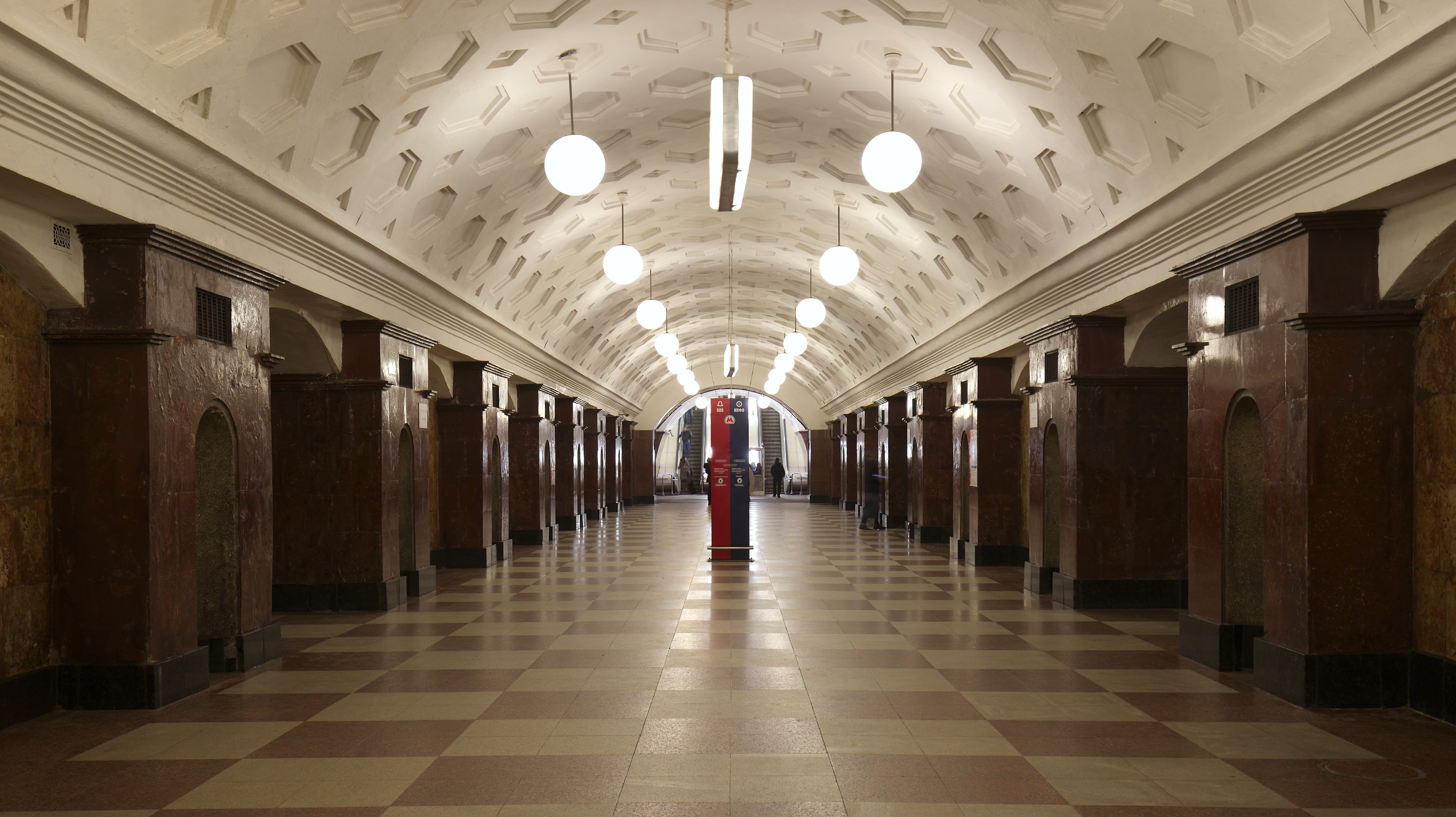

General information
- Location: Krasnoselsky District; Central Administrative Okrug; Moscow; Russia
- Coordinates: 55.7690°N 37.6487°E
- System: Moscow Metro station
- Owner: Moskovsky Metropoliten
- Line: Sokolnicheskaya line
- Platforms: 1 island platform
- Tracks: 2
- Connections: Trolleybus: 10, 24, Б (B)

Construction
- Structure type: Deep pylon tri-vault
- Depth: 31 metres (102 ft)
- Platform levels: 1
- Parking: No
- Cycle facilities: No

Other information
- Station code: 007

History
- Opened: 15 May 1935; 91 years ago
- Former names: Lermontovskaya (1962–1986)

Services
Preceding station	Moscow Metro	Following station
Chistye Prudy towards Potapovo	Sokolnicheskaya line	Komsomolskaya towards Bulvar Rokossovskogo
Route map
Location
- Location within Central Moscow

Krasnye Vorota (Russian: Кра́сные воро́та, English: Red Gate) is a Moscow Metro station in the Krasnoselsky District, Central Administrative Okrug, Moscow, Russia. It opened on 15 May 1935 as one of the initial ten stations of the Metro. It is on the Sokolnicheskaya Line, between Chistye Prudy and Komsomolskaya stations.

== History ==
Work began on Krasnye Vorota in the spring of 1932 and proceeded smoothly despite fears that the untested three-arch design would collapse under the weight of the soil. The station opened without a delay on 15 May 1935.

During planning, there were several working names including Krasnovorotskaya Ploshchad, and Krasnovorotskaya. The station's name means Red Gate in Russian and comes from the square where the famous triumphal archway, Red Gate, once stood. The arch, which celebrated Russia's victory in the Battle of Poltava, was demolished in 1927; but the name of the square remained until 1941.

In 1962, authorities renamed the station Lermontovskaya in honour of the Russian author Mikhail Lermontov. The square was renamed for Lermontov in 1941. There is still a bust of Lermontov at the end of the platform. The name reverted to Krasnye Vorota on 25 August 1986.

In 1952 the first turnstile in the Moscow Metro system was installed at this station.

== Design ==
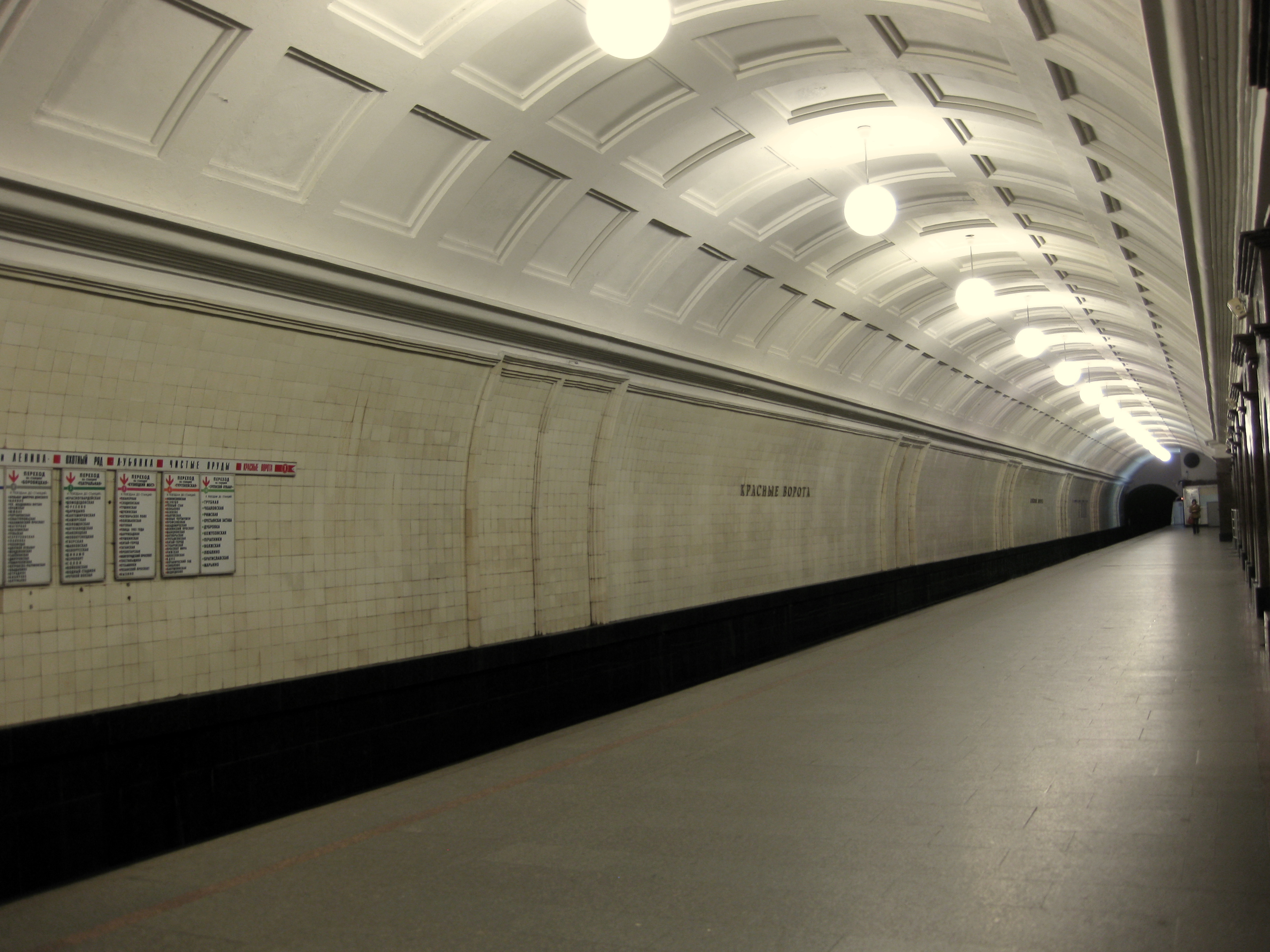
Station platform of Krasnye Vorota

Architects Ivan Fomin and N. Andrikanis designed the station. It was one of Moscow's first four deep-level stations, and one of the first two to employ a three-arched design with three parallel, circular tunnels. In this type of station, the outer tubes (which house the tracks and platforms) are separated from the larger central hall by heavy pylons. This design was planned to be used for the first time on the four central-city stations on the first Metro line, Krasnye Vorota, Chistye Prudy, Lubyanka, and Okhotnyi Ryad. However, due to construction difficulties a simpler two-arched design was implemented at Lubyanka and Chistye Prudy.

Krasnye Vorota has off-white tiled walls and pylons faced with dark red Shrosha marble from Georgia. A model of the station was exhibited at the 1938 World's Fair in Paris, where it was awarded a Grand Prix.

== Entrance ==
Krasnye Vorota has two entrances. The southern is a subterranean vestibule with mezzanine stairwells and a distinctive shell-like pavilion designed by Nikolai Ladovsky, that stands on the south side of the Garden Ring (with an open Red Gates plaza in front of it), on the intersection of Myasnitsky drive, Boyarsky side-street and Khoromny lane. The original three 28.4 metre (93 ft) high N-type escalators were replaced in 1994 by ET-3M models. The works included a renovation of the vestibule.

The second entrance was built into the ground floor of the Red Gate skyscraper, designed by architect Alexey Dushkin and opened on 31 July 1954, the architecture carries resemblance of the more flamboyant Stalinist style. Due to the landscape of the region, it required the escalator tunnels to be split. As a result, there is a small incline that follows the axis of the station (3 x EM-1M escalators, 11.5 metres {37 ft} high) and a great incline that brings commuters to the ground level (3 x EM-4 escalators, 18.5 metres {60 ft}). It is scheduled to close for renovation in January 2014 which would include the replacement of escalators.
