= Lubyanka (Moscow Metro) =

Metro station in Russia

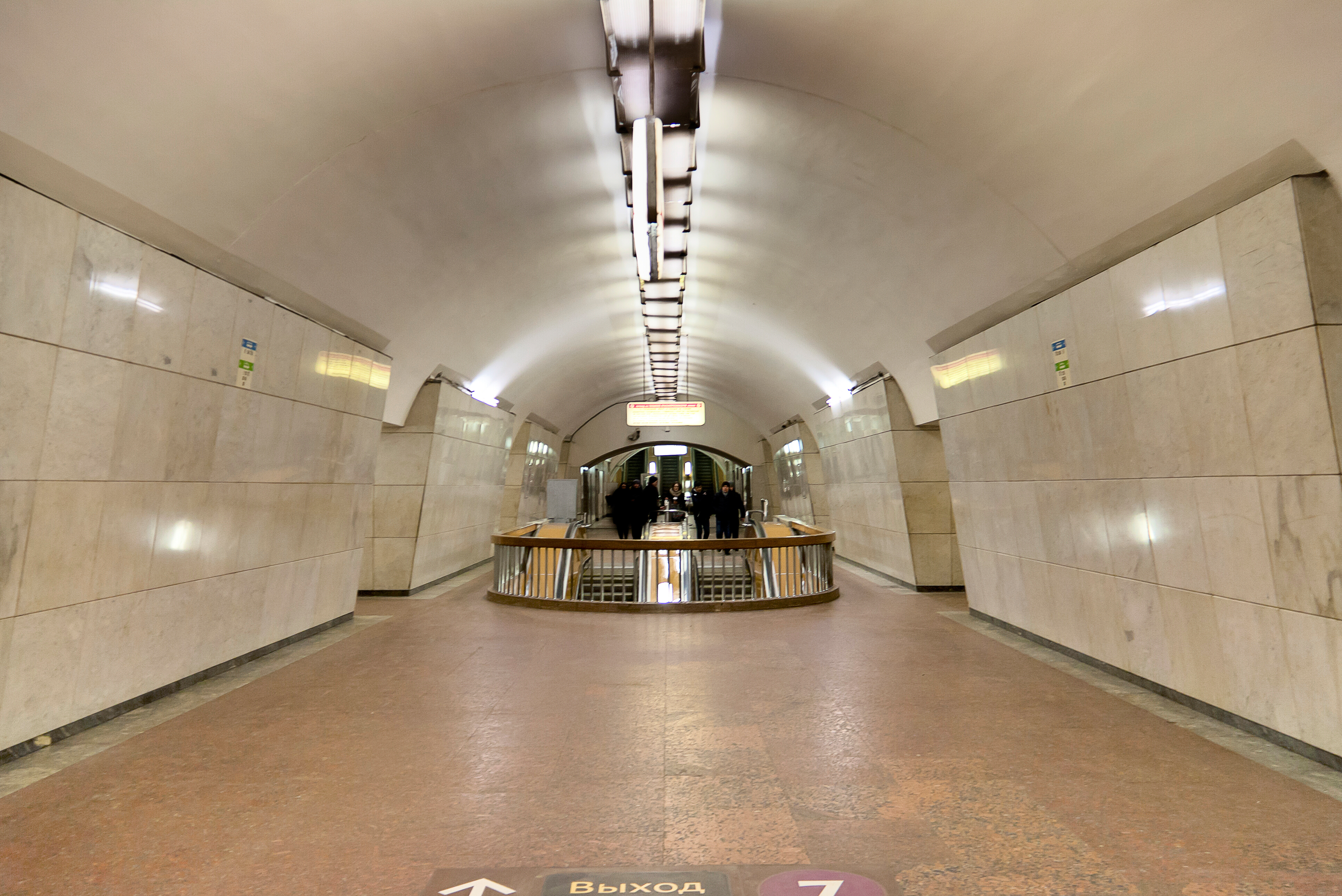

General information
- Location: Tverskoy District; Meshchansky District; Basmanny District; Krasnoselsky District; Central Administrative Okrug; Moscow; Russia
- Coordinates: 55.7597°N 37.6272°E
- System: Moscow Metro station
- Owner: Moskovsky Metropoliten
- Line: Sokolnicheskaya line
- Platforms: 1
- Tracks: 2
- Connections: Bus: К, 12ц, 158; Trolleybus: 2, 9, 12, 25, 33, 45, 48, 63

Construction
- Structure type: Deep pylon triple-vault station
- Depth: 32.5 metres (107 ft)
- Platform levels: 1
- Parking: No
- Cycle facilities: No

Other information
- Station code: 009

History
- Opened: 15 May 1935; 91 years ago
- Former names: Dzerzhinskaya (1935-1990)

Passengers
- 2002: 14,892,000

Services
Preceding station	Moscow Metro	Following station
Okhotny Ryad towards Potapovo	Sokolnicheskaya line	Chistye Prudy towards Bulvar Rokossovskogo
Pushkinskaya towards Planernaya	Tagansko-Krasnopresnenskaya line transfer at Kuznetsky Most	Kitay-gorod towards Kotelniki
Route map
Location
- Location within Central Moscow

Lubyanka (Russian: Лубя́нка) is a station on the Sokolnicheskaya Line of the Moscow Metro, located under Lubyanka Square. The facility, originally called Dzerzhinskaya (Russian: Дзержинская) station, opened in 1935 as part of the first stage of the metro.

== Name ==
The station was originally named Dzerzhinskaya after Dzerzhinsky Square, but it was changed on 5 November 1990 after the square's original name, Lubyanka, was restored. There is still a bust of Felix Dzerzhinsky, who the square was originally named after, in the station vestibule.

== History ==
Construction work on the station began in December 1933, and the engineers were faced with extremely difficult soil conditions from the outset. The area under Lubyanka square is made of Jurassic clay, beneath which are layers of quicksand and Carboniferous clay. The Metro station was planned to rest on top of the Carboniferous clay, which was thought to be firm enough to support its weight. It was quickly discovered, however, that the clay was much softer than anticipated due to the proximity of an underground channel of the Neglinnaya River and also tended to swell greatly when exposed to air. This meant that the tunnels had to be built one section at a time, very quickly, in order to allow the concrete to set before the pressure exerted by the expanding clay increased to the point where the wooden forms could no longer contain it.

Nikolai Ladovsky's initial design had to be significantly modified in order to cope with these problems. In order to minimize the amount of excavation required, the planned full-length central hall was abandoned in favour of a short passage at the end of the station connecting the two platform tubes, similar to many London Underground stations. This simplified the construction of the station while still allowing the planned hall to be built in the future.

Even after the design change, the station's construction was plagued by difficulties. Quicksand from between the two layers of clay began to seep into the construction site almost immediately, and due to the unexpected softness of the Carboniferous clay the station began to slowly sink. Nevertheless, the builders of the station were able to surmount these problems and Lubyanka was opened as planned on 15 May 1935. The heroic efforts of the Metro builders are memorialized in a sculptural composition in the vestibule on Nikolskaya street.

In 1965 it was revealed that Lubyanka was to become a transfer point to the planned Tagansko-Krasnopresnenskaya Line, making it clear that the station would need to be completed. Technology had advanced to the point where the building of the central hall, which had been deemed impossible in the 1930s, could finally be accomplished, though this project still took more than seven years to complete. The first phase of the station's expansion was the construction of a second entrance at the northern end, which was completed in 1968.

The construction of the northern half of the central hall was simplified by using the new technique of soil freezing, but this could not be used on the southern half. Workers were forced to go back to the original method of quickly building one tunnel segment at a time before the expansion of the clay could crush them. Once the central hall was finished passages to the platforms were blown through using explosives. In 1972 the station was finally reopened.

The reconstruction of the station was an engineering triumph, but it was much less impressive aesthetically with blocky white marble pylons and white tiled walls replacing the strikingly patterned dark marble used in the old station. Though the old section of the central hall still exists, the overall effect has been lost. The architects of the expansion were Nina Alexandrovna Aleshin and A.F. Strelkov. In 1975, escalators were added in the centre of the platform for the transfer to the new Kuznetsky Most station.

== Entrances and transfers ==
The station has numerous entrances, but only two vestibules. The original western vestibule is subterranean and its entrance pavilion is built into the ground floor of a building that stands at the start of the Nikolskaya Street on one side and Malyy Cherkassky side street on the other. The distinctive facade, facing the Lubyanka square, with twin arches was designed by architect Iosif Loveyko, to remind the public of the historic Vladimir gates of the Kitay-gorod wall that was demolished a few years prior. In 1957 a subway was built connecting the vestibule and the new Detsky Mir (Children's World) shop, under the Teatralny drive. The original 3 N-type escalators were replaced in 1997 by ET-3M type (21.8 metres/71 ft high), during which the vestibule underwent renovation.

The second entrance was opened in 1968, due to the landscape and the axis of the station platform to vestibule is done via two escalators and an interim mezzanine station that rotates the passenger traffic by 180 degrees. The large incline from platform to the mezzanine retains the three LT-4 21.4 metre (70 ft) high escalators. The 7 metre (23 ft) high smaller incline to the subterranean vestibule originally had three LP-6I escalators, but as this model proved troublesome after long use, it was prematurely replaced throughout the Metro during the 1990s. Lubyanka's turn came in 1995 and three ET-5Ms now soldier in their place.

Building of the vestibule included a reconstruction of the whole square, that feature a long subway under the square's square's eastern and southern perimeter: two entrances on the corner of the FSB headquarters and a service drive along its western facade, two on the corner of FSB's computing centre (Lubyasky drive and Myasnitskaya street), a further two to the small garden before the Polytechnical Museum the containing the Solovetsky Stone memorial (Lubyansky drive and Novaya square) and a final two right in front of the original entrance. From the new subway, a small passageway was added linking the old vestibule underground. It is thus possible to circumvent the whole square underground and walk from one vestibule to the other without descending to the platforms.

In 2008 the Detsky Mir was closed for reconstruction, and the original building that the entrance was built into was demolished in 2010 and a Kempinski hotel is being erected in its place, though the ground floor and facade are retained. Thus the only way to access the original vestibule is via the mentioned passageway.

The station serves as a transfer point to Kuznetsky Most, which linked by a passenger tunnel under the station. Access to which is provided by a pair of tandem escalators in the middle of the central hall. Like on the entrance, the original four LP-6I units, in place since 1975, were replaced in 1993 by ET-5M series.

== 2010 bombing ==
On 29 March 2010 a bomb was reported to have gone off at the Lubyanka station, on the Sokolnicheskaya (Сокольническая), during rush hour, at 7:56 AM local time. Early reports suggest that 40 people have been killed, 14 of whom were in the second train carriage where the explosion is believed to have taken place.

A second explosion was reported at Park Kultury station

== Gallery ==
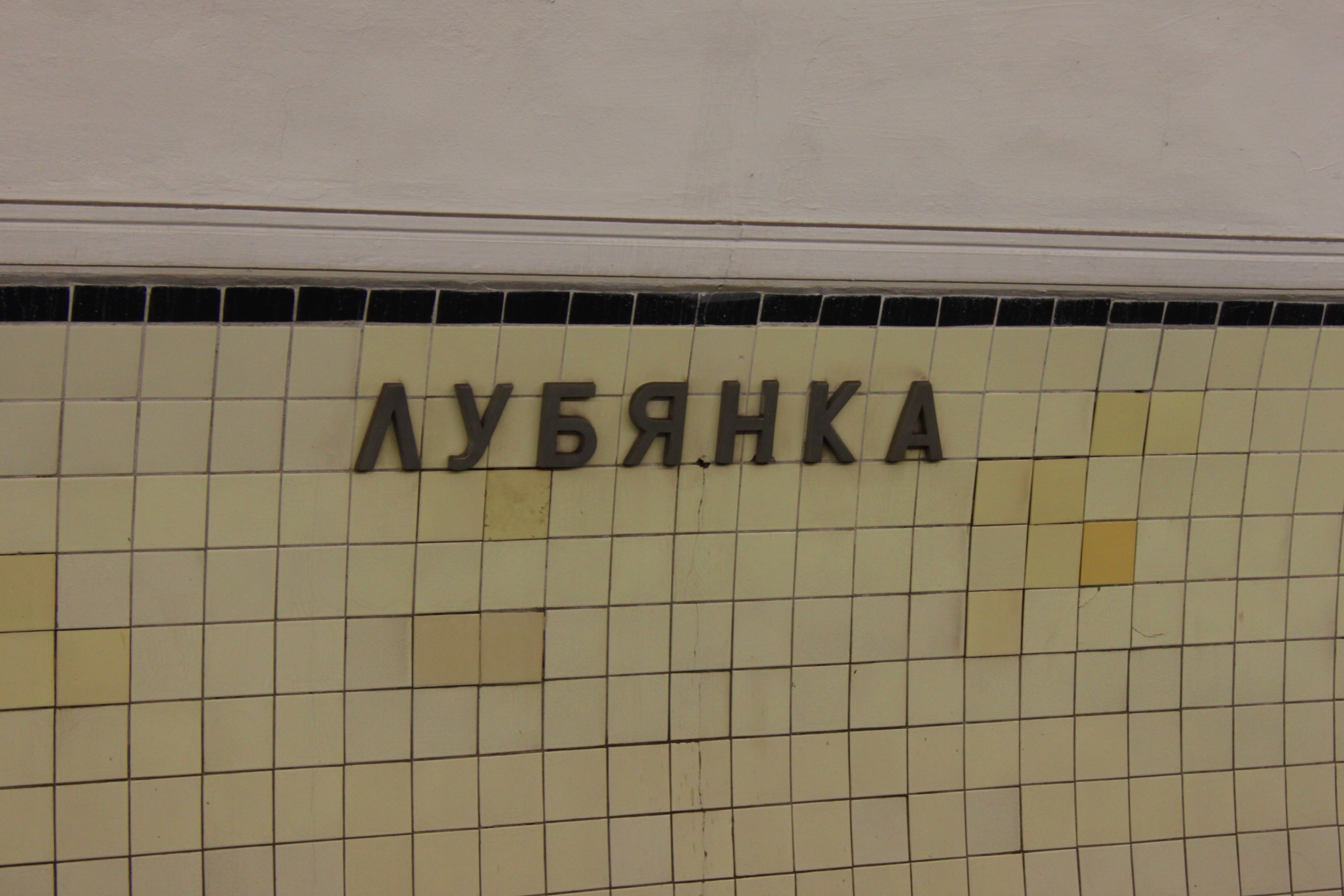
Sign saying Lubyanka, 2009.

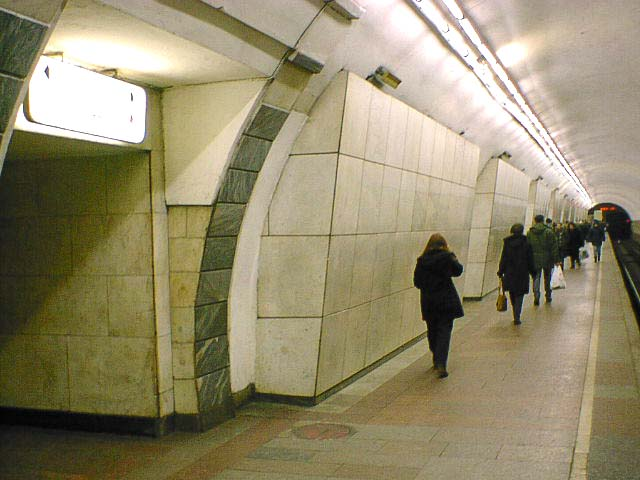
New view of the platform. A segment of the old view is seen. 2000.

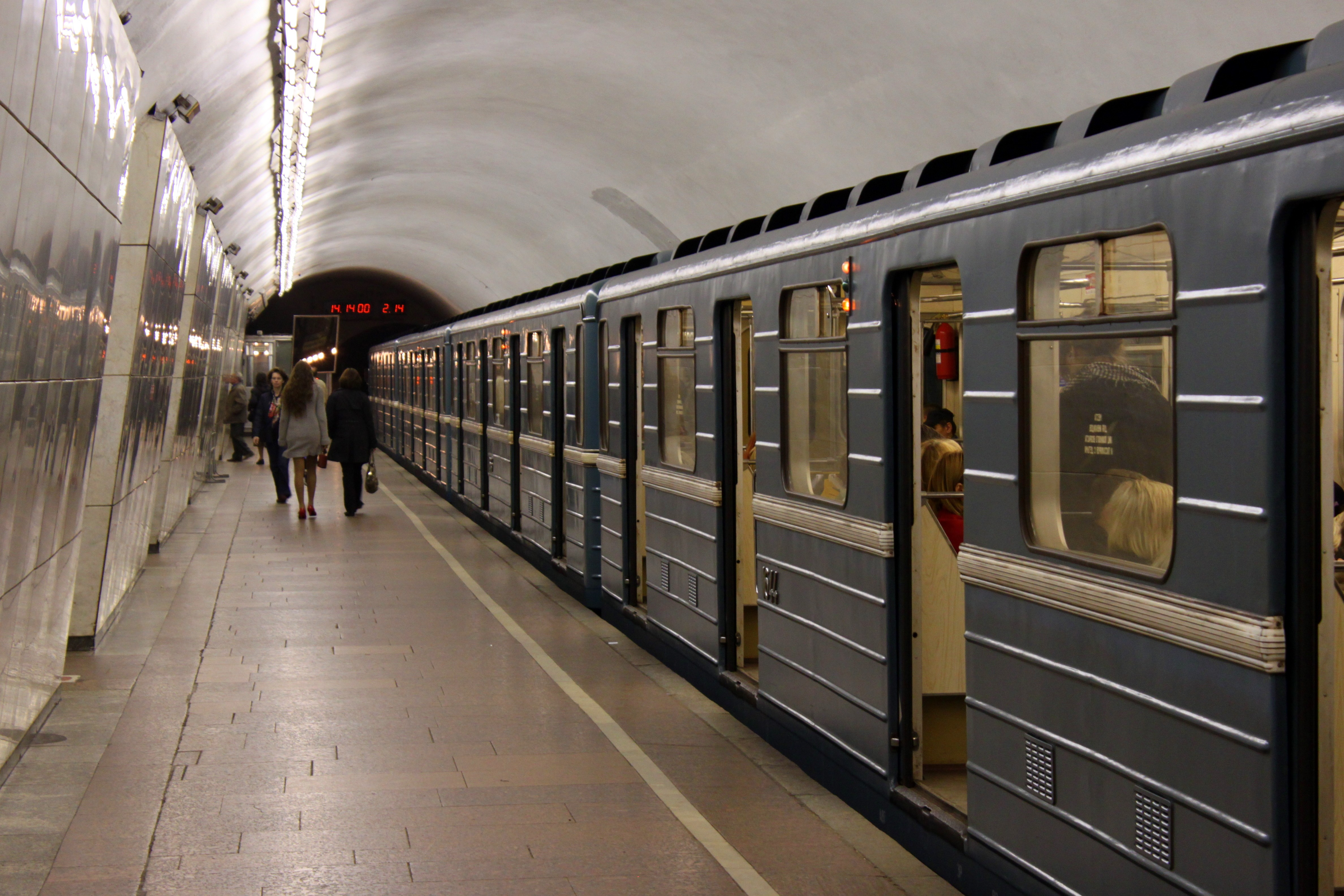
New view of the platform, 2009.

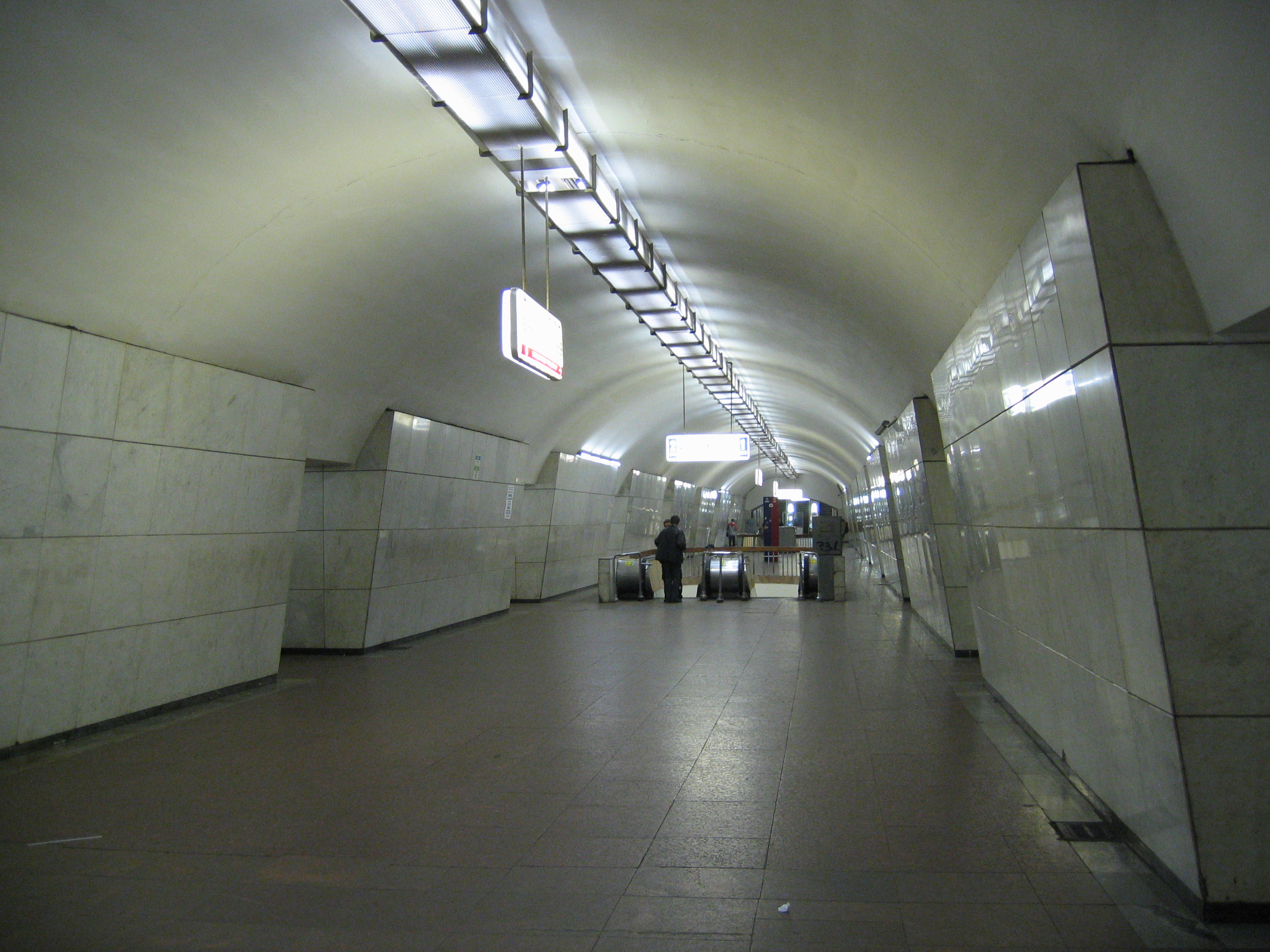
The central hall, 2007.

== Sources ==
- Shvidkovsky, Dmitrii (2007). Russian Architecture and the West. London: Yale University Press. p. 361. ISBN 978-0-300-10912-2.
