= Moscow Museum of Modern Art =

Museum in Moscow, Russia

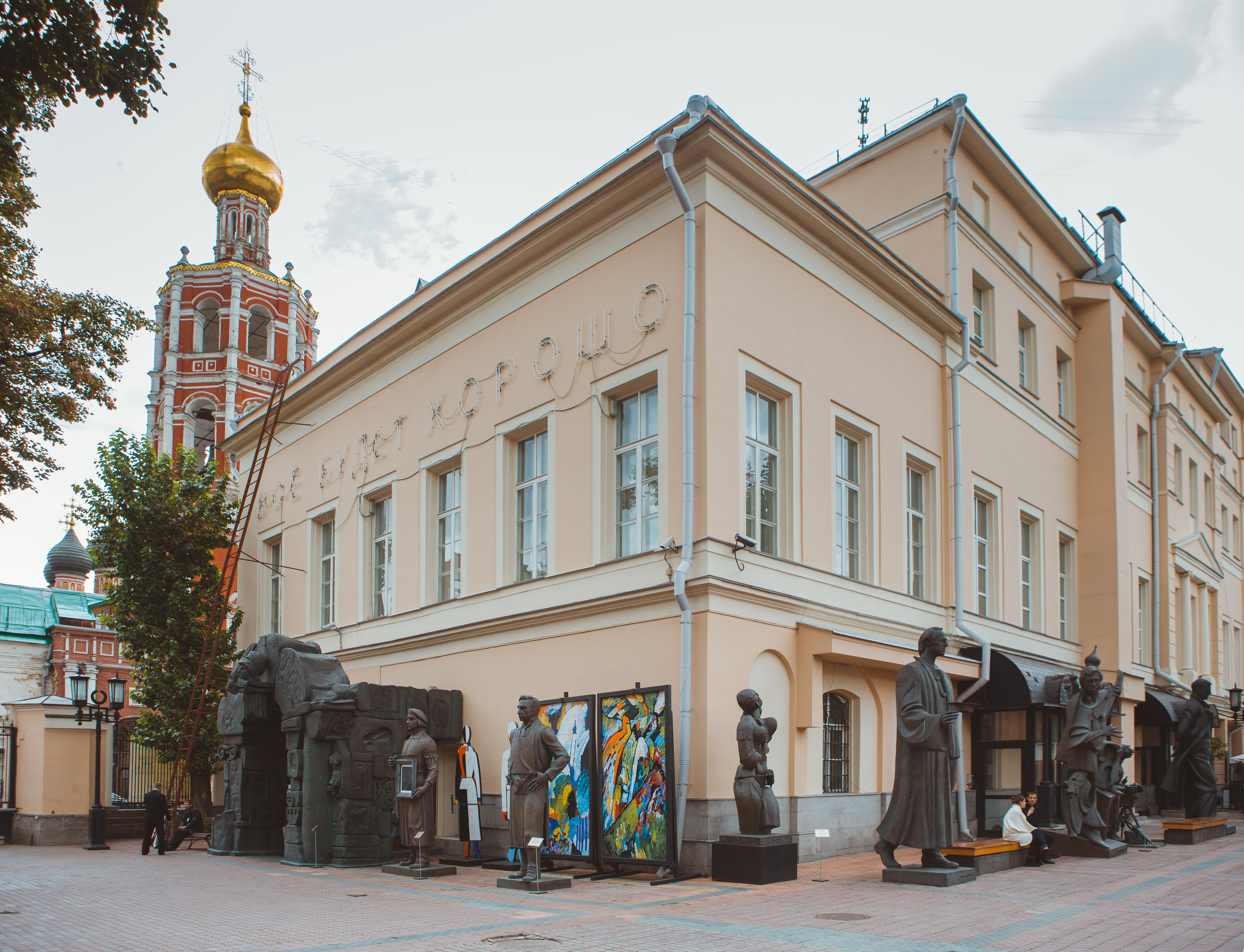
- The main building of the Moscow Museum of Modern Art, Petrovka 25 MMOMA
- Established: December 15, 1999
- Location: 25 Petrovka Street; 17 Ermolaevsky Lane; 9 Tverskoy Boulevard; 10 Gogolevsky Boulevard; 15 Bolshaya Gruzinskaya
- Coordinates: 55.7670°N 37.6142°E
- Website: www.mmoma.ru

The Moscow Museum of Modern Art (Russian: Московский музей современного искусства) is a museum of modern and contemporary art located in Moscow, Russia. It was opened to public in December 1999. The project of the museum was initiated and executed by Zurab Tsereteli, president of the Russian Academy of Arts. In 2018, The Vadim Sidur Museum and Museum-Studio of Dmitry Nalbandyan are branches of the Moscow Museum of Modern Arts.

== Location ==
The Moscow Museum of Modern Art is situated at 25 Petrovka St., near the Petrovsky Boulevard in central Moscow. It is housed in the former Gubin's mansion, designed by the Russian architect Matvei Kazakov.

In December 2003, the museum expanded its galleries to a second location — the exhibition hall at the Ermolayevsky Pereulok, Patriarshiye Ponds area. On February 7, 2007, the Moscow Museum of Modern Art opened its third exhibition venue — Gallery at Tverskoy boulevard, 9.

Building at Gogolevsky Boulevard, 10 is also the creation of the architect Matvey Kazakov. It was built in the late XVIII century. On Bolshaya Gruzinskaya, 15 in Moscow there is a house built at the end of the 19th century. Today there is a museum of the artist Zurab Tsereteli. The Vadim Sidur Museum (Novogireevskaya Street, 37A) is a museum of contemporary sculpture in Moscow housing the collection of artworks by Vadim Sidur, a sculptor, artist and poet. The Museum-Studio of Dmitry Nalbandyan (Tverskaya street, 8/2) is part of the Moscow Museum of Modern Art since 2018.

== Collection ==
The core of the museum's assemblage was constituted from the private collection of Zurab Tsereteli, its founder and director. A special emphasis has been given to the collection of Russian avant-garde art. The museum displays the interesting exposition dedicated to the art of non-conformists of the 1950–70s, whose creative activity was in the opposition to the Soviet ideology. Among them are V. Nemukhin, E. Steinberg, V. Komar, A. Melamid, A. Ney, O. Rabin, A. Zverev, D. Krasnopevtsev, and more. The Moscow Museum of Modern Art contains works of art from the first decades of the 20th century.

To celebrate its 20th birthday, the institution invited 20 celebrities from all walks of life to curate its anniversary exhibition. The guest curators include Russian football star Fedor Smolov, designer Andrei Artemov, writer Vladimir Sorokin, TV showman and art collector Andrey Malakhov, theatre director Kirill Serebrennikov and even Marusya (Mail.ru's voice-controlled personal assistant).

== Education ==
The School of Modern Art (by the name of "Free Studios") works alongside the museum, featuring a two-year program which is realized in concrete practice in creative studiowork. Included in the program are lectures on modern art, the study of contemporary visual art technologies, mastery of a spectrum of intellectual problems surrounding contemporary culture and familiarization with today's art market.

== Research and conservation ==
The research work of the museum revolves around the museum's collection. There is a research library at the museum, with a collection of Russian and international art publications.

== Publishing ==
Publishing is one of the top priorities in MMOMA's educational activities.

Nearest Metro: Gogolevskiy 10 Kropotkinskaya, Ermolaevskiy 17 Mayakovskaya, Petrovka 25, Tverskoy 9 Chekhovskaya, Pushkinskaya, Tverskaya
