= Tverskaya Street =

Thoroughfare in Moscow, Russia

Coordinates: 55°45′26″N 37°36′53″E

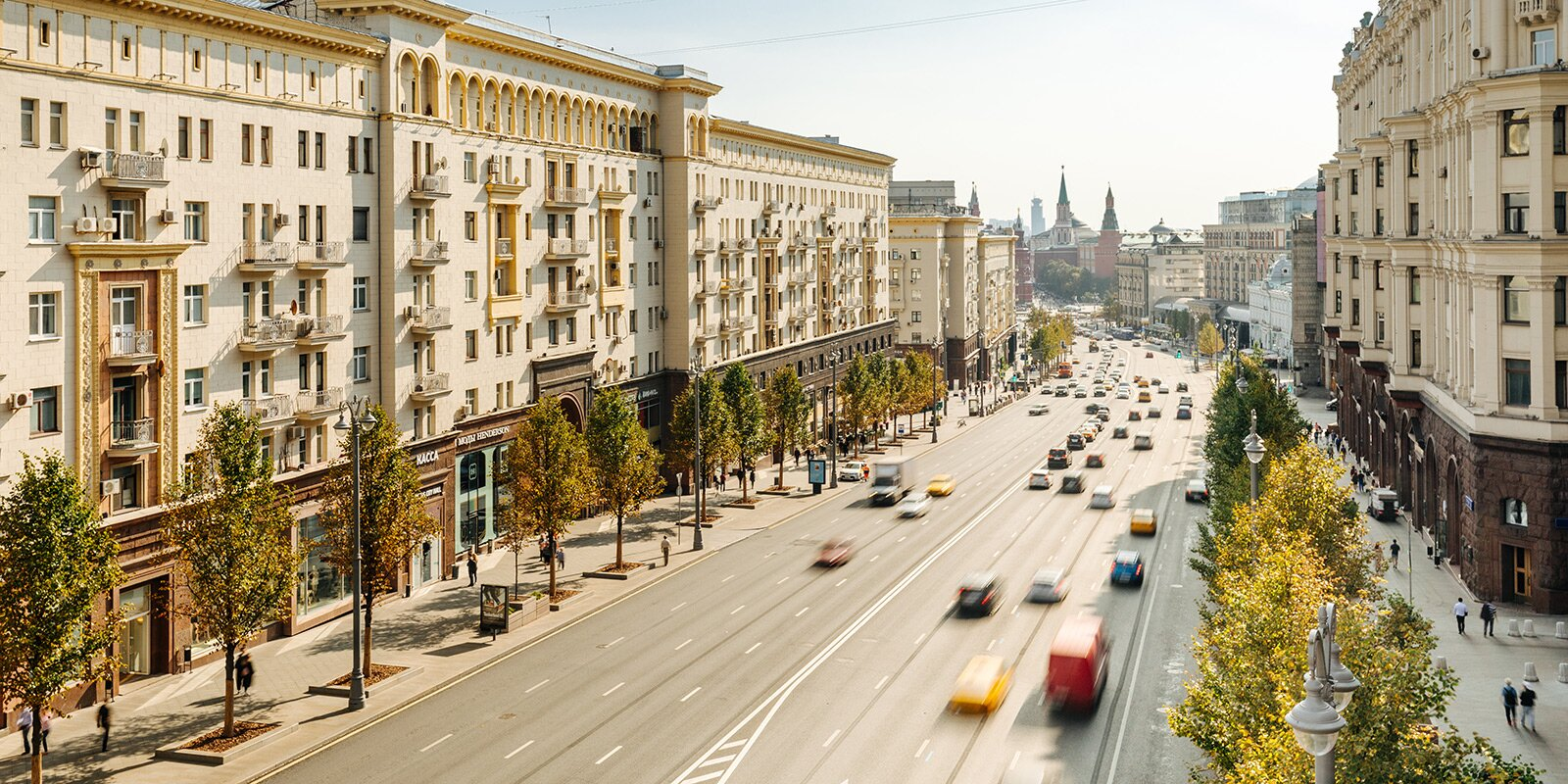
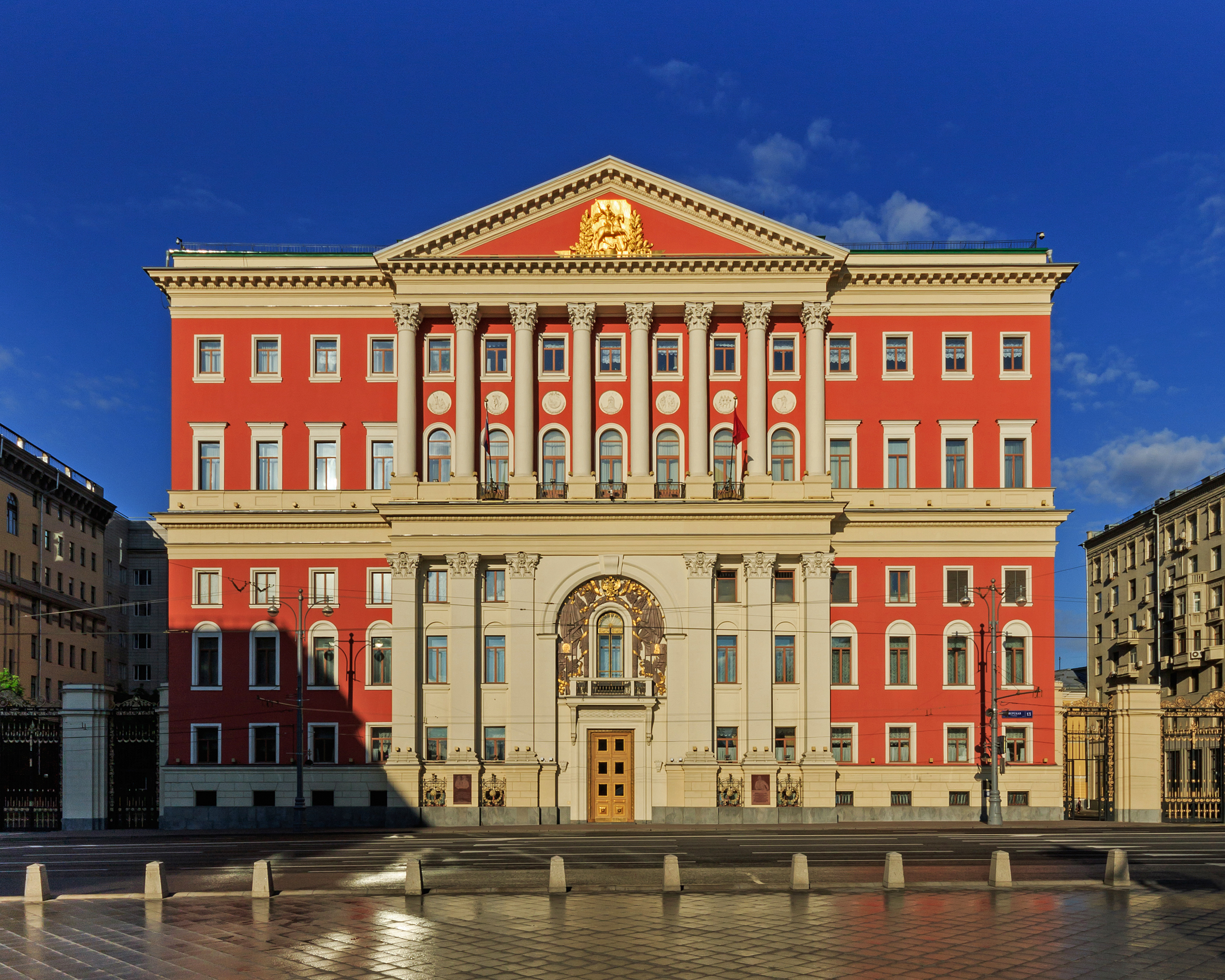
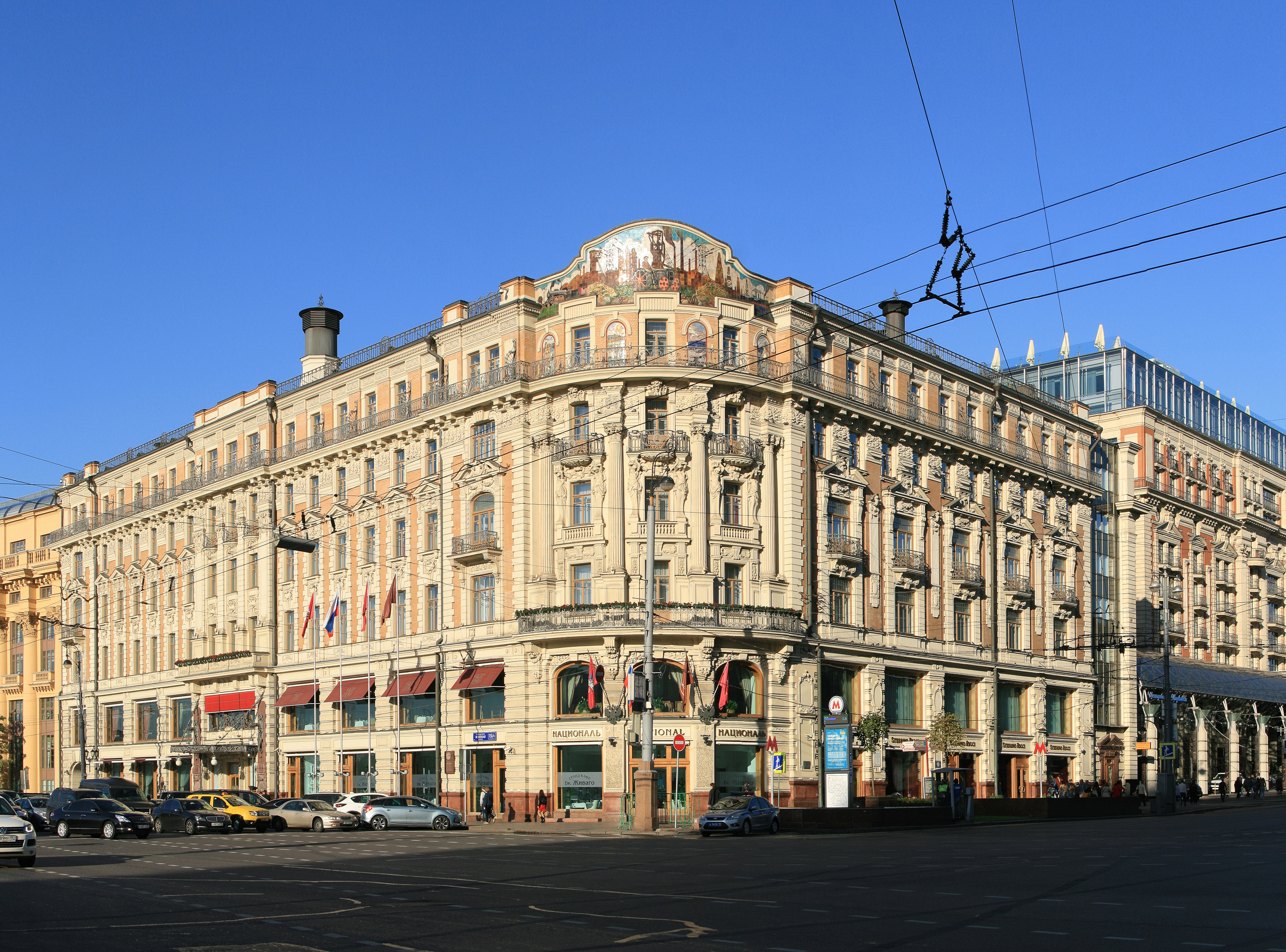
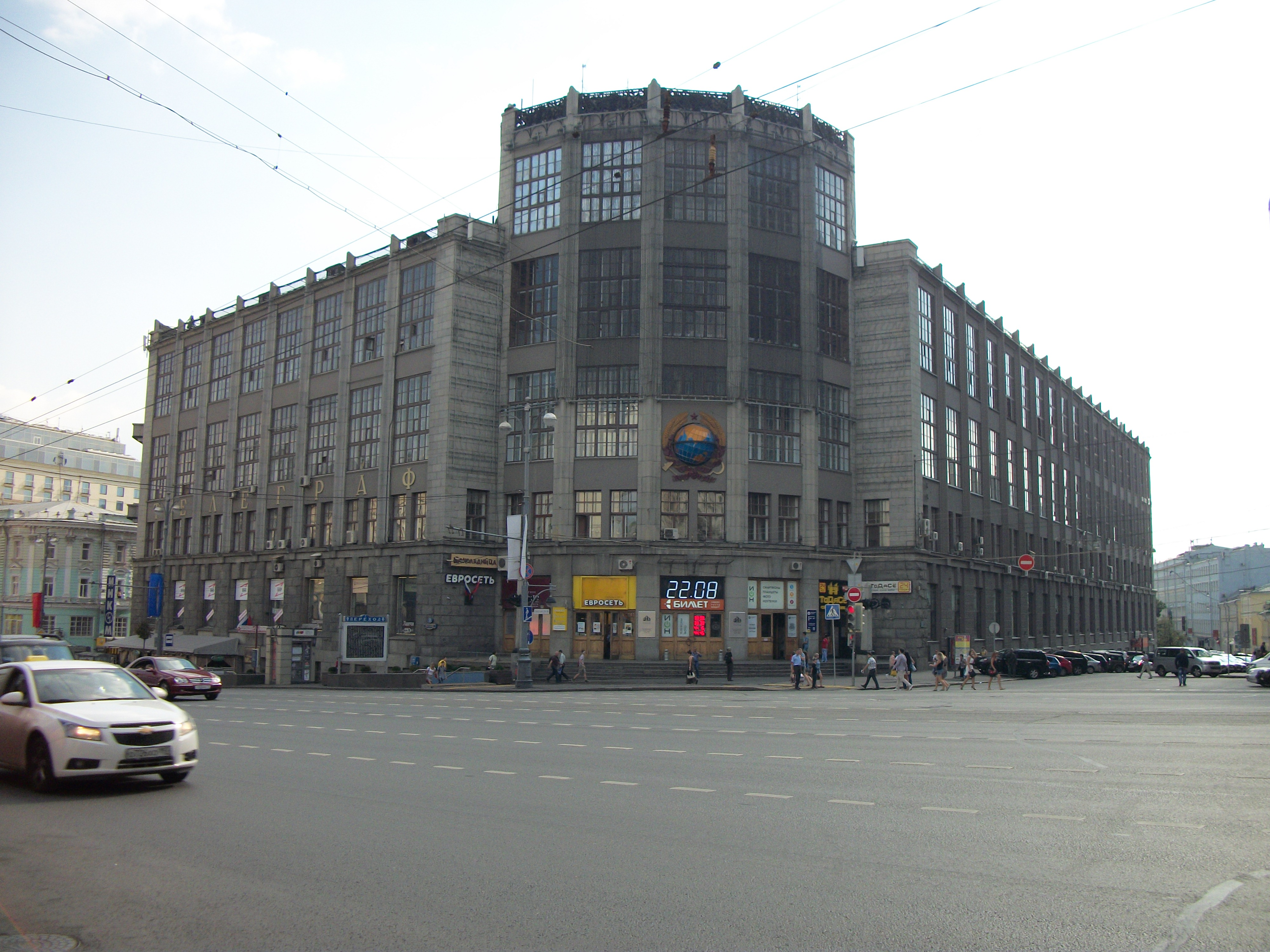
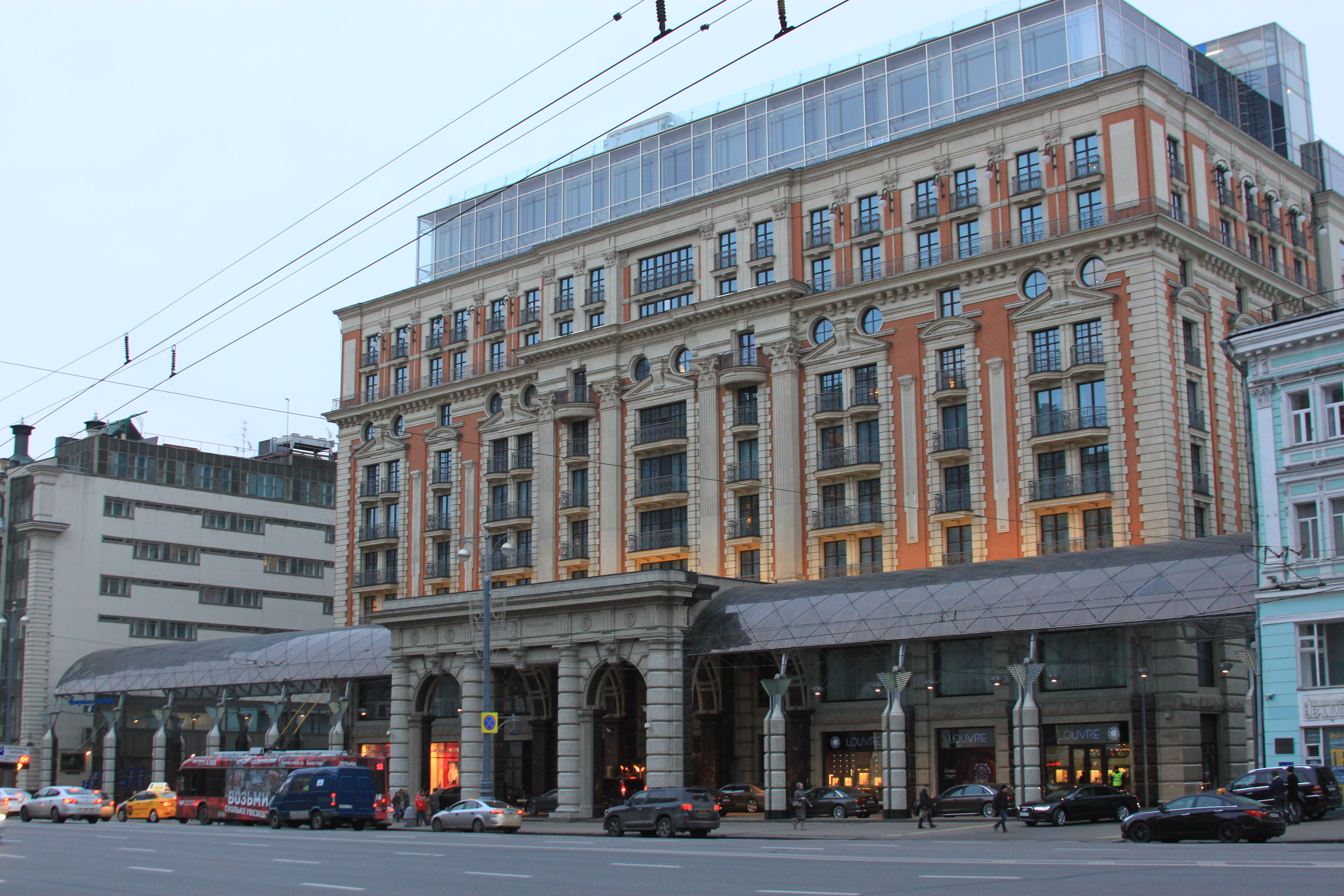
- Clockwise from top: View on State Historical Museum, Hotel National, The Carlton Moscow, Central Telegraph Building, Moscow Mayor's office
- Interactive map of Tverskaya Street
- Native name: Тверская улица (Russian)
- Length: 1.6 km (0.99 mi)
- Location: Moscow, Russia; Central Administrative Okrug; Tverskoy District
- Postal code: 125009, 125032, 127006
- Nearest metro station: Okhotny Ryad; Mayakovskaya; Tverskaya; Pushkinskaya

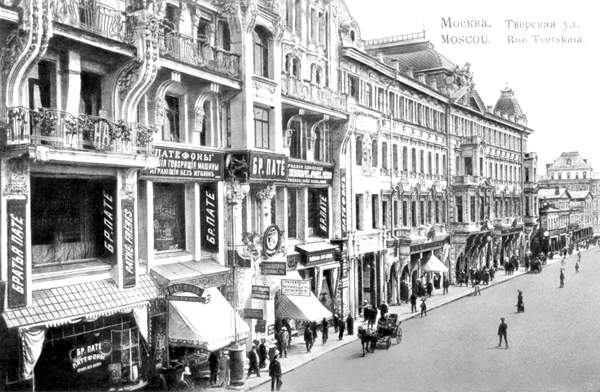
Tverskaya Street in the 19th century

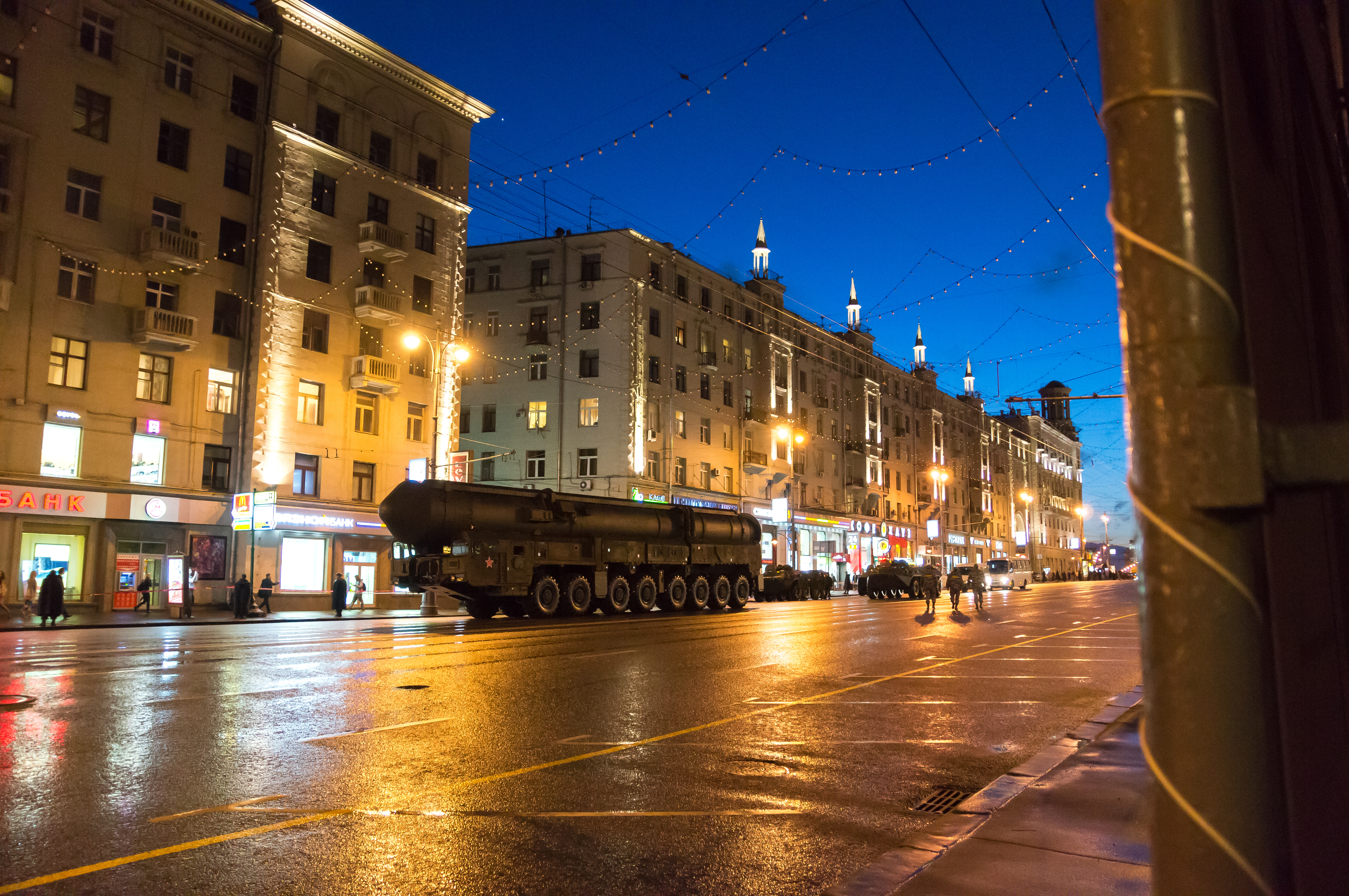
Tverskaya Street in the 21st century during Victory Day celebration

Tverskaya Street (Russian: Тверская улица, IPA: [tvʲɪrˈskajə ˈulʲɪt͡sə]), known between 1935 and 1990 as Gorky Street (Russian: улица Горького), is the main radial street in Moscow. The street runs Northwest from the central Manege Square in the direction of Saint Petersburg and terminates at the Garden Ring, giving the name to Tverskoy District. The route continues further as First Tverskaya-Yamskaya Street, Leningradsky Avenue and Leningradskoye Highway.

== History and architecture ==
=== Middle Ages to 18th century ===
Tourists are told that Tverskaya Street existed as early as the 12th century. Its importance for the medieval city was immense, as it connected Moscow with its superior, and later chief rival, Tver. At that time, the thoroughfare crossed the Neglinnaya River. The first stone bridge across the Neglinnaya was set up in 1595.

In the 17th and 18th centuries, Tverskaya Street was renowned as the centre of Moscow's social life. The nobility considered it fashionable to settle in this district. Among the Palladian mansions dating from the reign of Catherine the Great are the residence of the mayor of Moscow (1778–1782), and the English Club (1780s). The mayor's residence among a number of other historic buildings was moved about 14 meters for the widening of the Gorky Street during Stalin's time. On the square before it stands a statue of the legendary founder of Moscow, Yuri Dolgoruky, erected for the city's 800th anniversary.

During the imperial period, the importance of the thoroughfare was highlighted by the fact that it was through this street that the tsars arrived from the Northern capital to stay at their Kremlin residence. Several triumphal arches were constructed to commemorate coronation ceremonies. In 1792, the Tverskaya Square was laid out before the official residence of the governor of Moscow as a staging ground for mass processions and parades. In 1947, the square was decorated with an equestrian statue of Prince Yury Dolgoruky, founder of Moscow.

=== 19th century ===
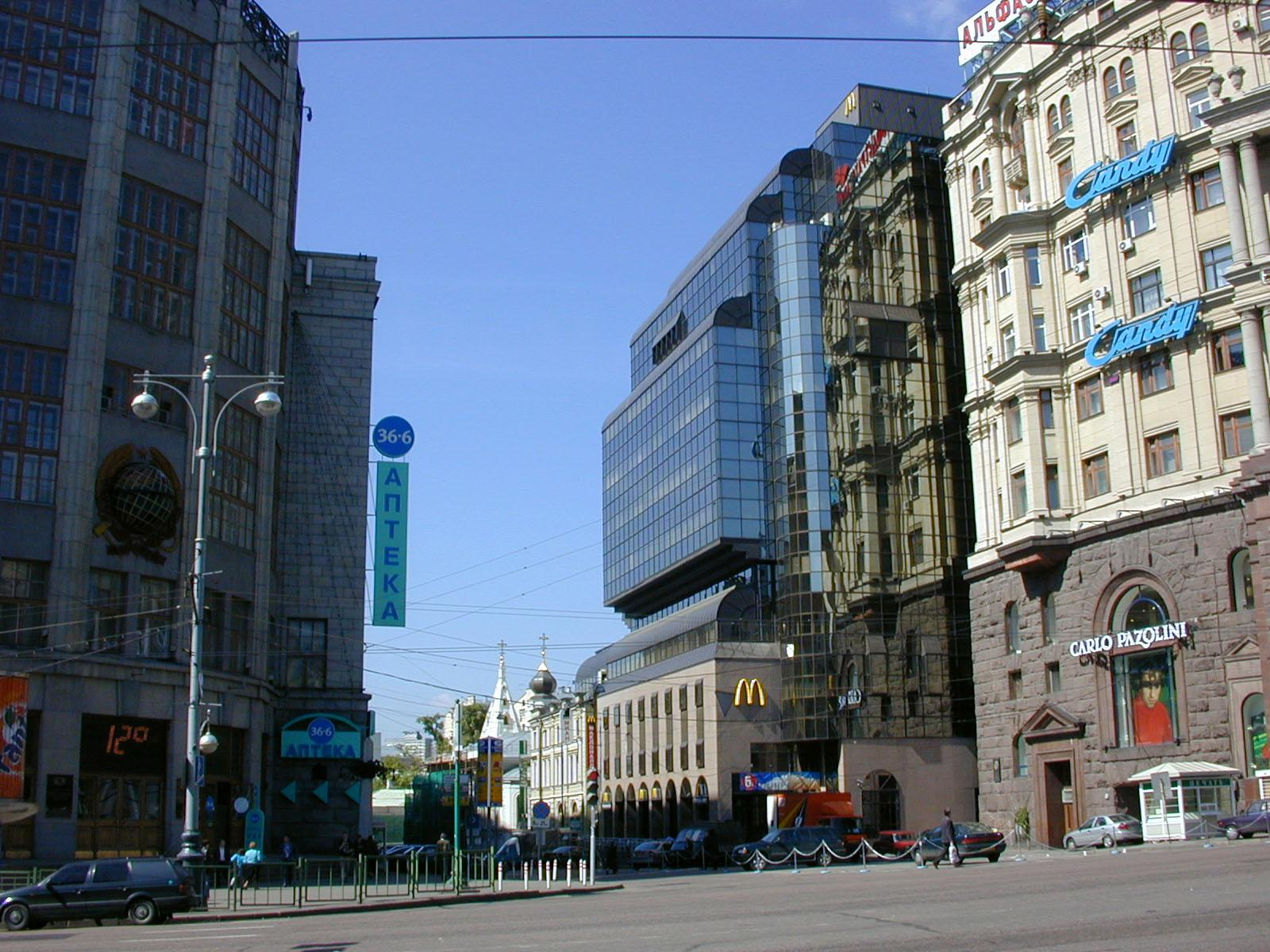
A bystreet, Gazetny Lane, with Central Telegraph Building on the left. This side street figures prominently in the novel Anna Karenina

During Pushkin's time, the Tverskaya was lined with five churches. The poet wove his impressions from the street into the following stanza of Eugene Onegin:

The columns of the city gate
Gleam white; the sleigh, more swift than steady,
Bumps down Tverskaya Street already.
Past sentry-boxes now they dash,
Past shops and lamp-posts, serfs who lash
Their nags, huts, mansions, monasteries,
Parks, pharmacies, Bukharans, guards,
Fat merchants, Cossacks, boulevards,
Old women, boys with cheeks like cherries,
Lions on gates with great stone jaws,
And crosses black with flocks of daws.

Towards the end of the 19th century, the street was reconstructed, with stately neoclassical mansions giving way to grandiose commercial buildings in an eclectic mixture of historical styles. A characteristic edifice of the time is the eclectic Hotel National, Moscow (1901-1903), whose interior is a landmark of Russian Art Nouveau. In 1888 the actor, theatre director and founder of the Moscow Art Theatre, Constantin Stanislavski, rented the Ginzburg House on the street and had it converted into a luxurious clubhouse with its own large stage and several exhibition rooms, in order to house his newly formed Society of Art and Literature. The Society gave its last performance there on 3 January 1891 and the building burnt down on the night of January 10.

=== Modern history ===
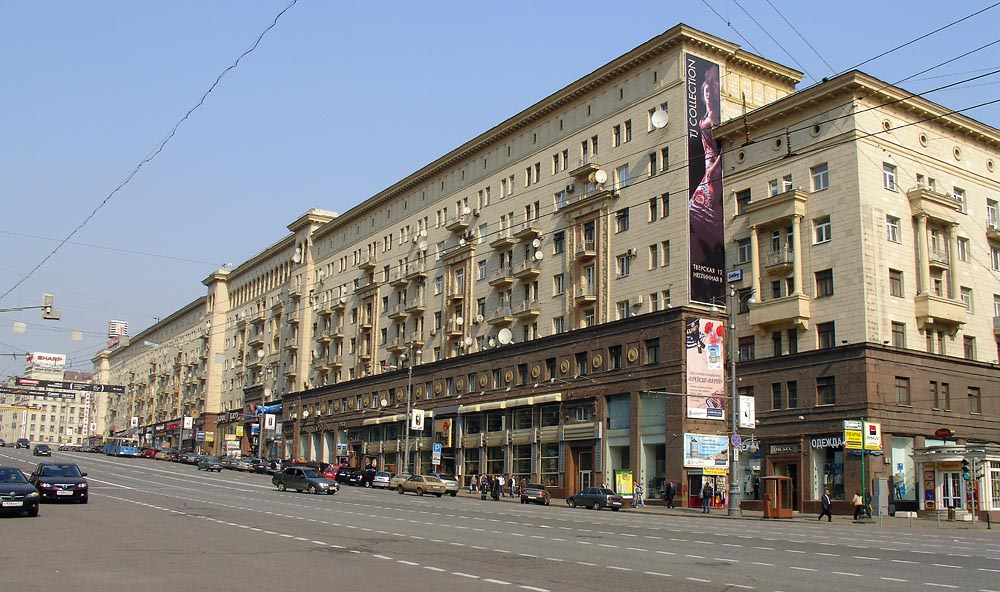
6, Tverskaya: 1940 building by Arkady Mordvinov

Between the Russian Revolution of 1917 and the rise of Stalinist architecture in mid-1930s, the street acquired three modernist buildings - constructivist Izvestia Building by Grigory Barkhin (1925–1927, Pushkin Square), Central Telegraph Building (1927–1929, 7 Tverskaya), a modernist masterpiece by Ivan Rerberg, and a stern "black cube" of the Lenin Institute in Tverskaya Square (1926) by Stepan Chernyshyov. The street was renamed in 1932 for Maxim Gorky, the Russian writer and revolutionary admired by both Vladimir Lenin and Josef Stalin.

Further expansion occurred in line with Soviet government's adoption of the 1935 master plan. During that period, all the churches and most other historic buildings were torn down in order to widen the street and replace low-rise buildings with larger, early Stalinist apartment blocks and government offices. Arkady Mordvinov, who handled this ambitious project, retained some historical buildings, like the ornately decorated Savvinskoye Podvorye by Ivan Kuznetsov. This building was moved to a new foundation North from the new street line, and is now completely enclosed inside Mordvinov's Stalinist block at 6, Tverskaya Street.

The project was only partially completed before World War II; more Stalinist blocks appeared in the 1940s and 1950s, still leaving a lot of 19th-century buildings. Most of them were torn down later, with a few exceptions like Yermolova Theatre still standing. Hotel Intourist, a 22-story tower built in 1970, was demolished in 2002 and replaced by the Ritz-Carlton Hotel Moscow.

When Soviet President Mikhail Gorbachev assumed power, he encouraged a return to the country's old Russian names. Thus, the street's name became "Tverskaya Street" again, after a 55-year interlude as Gorky Street.

== Layout and functions ==
Tverskaya Street runs from the Manege Square through the Tverskoy District and the crossing with the Boulevard Ring, known as Pushkinskaya Square, to the Garden Ring. Its extension, First Tverskaya-Yamskaya Street, continues further on Northwest right up to Belorussky Rail Terminal (Tverskaya Zastava Square), changing its name again into Leningradsky Avenue. It keeps the same direction before diverging into Volokolamskoye Shosse and Leningradskoye Highway (Leningrad Highway).

In the early 2010s, Tverskaya Street had the highest retail rents in Russia, before nearby Stoleshnikov Lane passed it by November 2014, according to Cushman & Wakefield. Restaurants and mass-market tenants largely replaced luxury retailers on Tverskaya Street after the 2014–2016 ruble depreciation and parking restrictions in central Moscow. Although Moscow's nightlife has mostly dispersed into nearby areas like Patriarch Ponds and Kitay-gorod, the avenue and its surrounding lanes continue to be a significant entertainment and dining corridor with major theaters, late-night bars, and restaurants.

== 21st-century streetscape reconstruction ==
Plans to rebuild the Tverskaya corridor, as part of the larger "Bolshaya Leningradka" highway project, into a grade-separated thoroughfare with multi-level traffic interchanges and underground commercial complexes at Tverskaya Zastava Square and Pushkinskaya Square were approved by the Moscow City Government under Mayor Yury Luzhkov in the mid-2000s. Plans to rebuild the Tverskaya corridor, as a part of the larger Bolshaya Leningradka highway project, into a grade-separated thoroughfare with multi-level traffic interchanges and underground commercial complexes at Tverskaya Zastava Square and Pushkinskaya Square were approved by the Moscow City Government under Mayor Yury Luzhkov in the mid-2000s. A December 2004 city decree authorized a 96,000 m^{2} (1,030,000 sq ft) underground shopping center and tunnel beneath Pushkinskaya Square, which was originally scheduled to be completed in 2007 but was later extended to 2009. Meanwhile, preparations at Tverskaya Zastava Square started in 2005 with the removal of the Monument to Maxim Gorky to the Muzeon Park of Arts.

Preservationists, urban planners, and residents opposed both projects, which also faced funding delays during the 2008–2010 economic crisis. After succeeding Luzhkov as mayor in 2010, Sergey Sobyanin halted the Pushkinskaya Square excavation and cancelled the planned underground shopping mall in October 2013. The planned shopping center and multi-level highway overpass at Tverskaya Zastava Square were also shelved by municipal authorities in 2011 due to possible harm to the area's historic streetscape.

As part of the city's My Street (Moya Ulitsa) urban renewal program, which was developed in consultation with the Strelka KB architectural consultancy, Tverskaya Street underwent a significant pedestrian-oriented makeover in 2016. Utility cables were buried underground, traffic lanes were narrowed, and granite-paved sidewalks were almost doubled in average width between Manege Square and Pushkinskaya Square, increasing pedestrian space by more than 7,000 m^{2} (75,000 sq ft). The project also restored building facades, installed period-style street lamps, and replanted the linden trees that historically lined the thoroughfare. In 2017, the program extended along First Tverskaya-Yamskaya Street to Tverskaya Zastava Square, where the restored Monument to Maxim Gorky, a tram turnaround loop, and a landscaped public square were unveiled.

== See also ==
- List of upscale shopping districts

== Sources ==
- Benedetti, Jean. 1999. Stanislavski: His Life and Art. Revised edition. Original edition published in 1988. London: Methuen. ISBN 0-413-52520-1.
