= Tverskoy District =

Tverskoy District Тверской район
- District
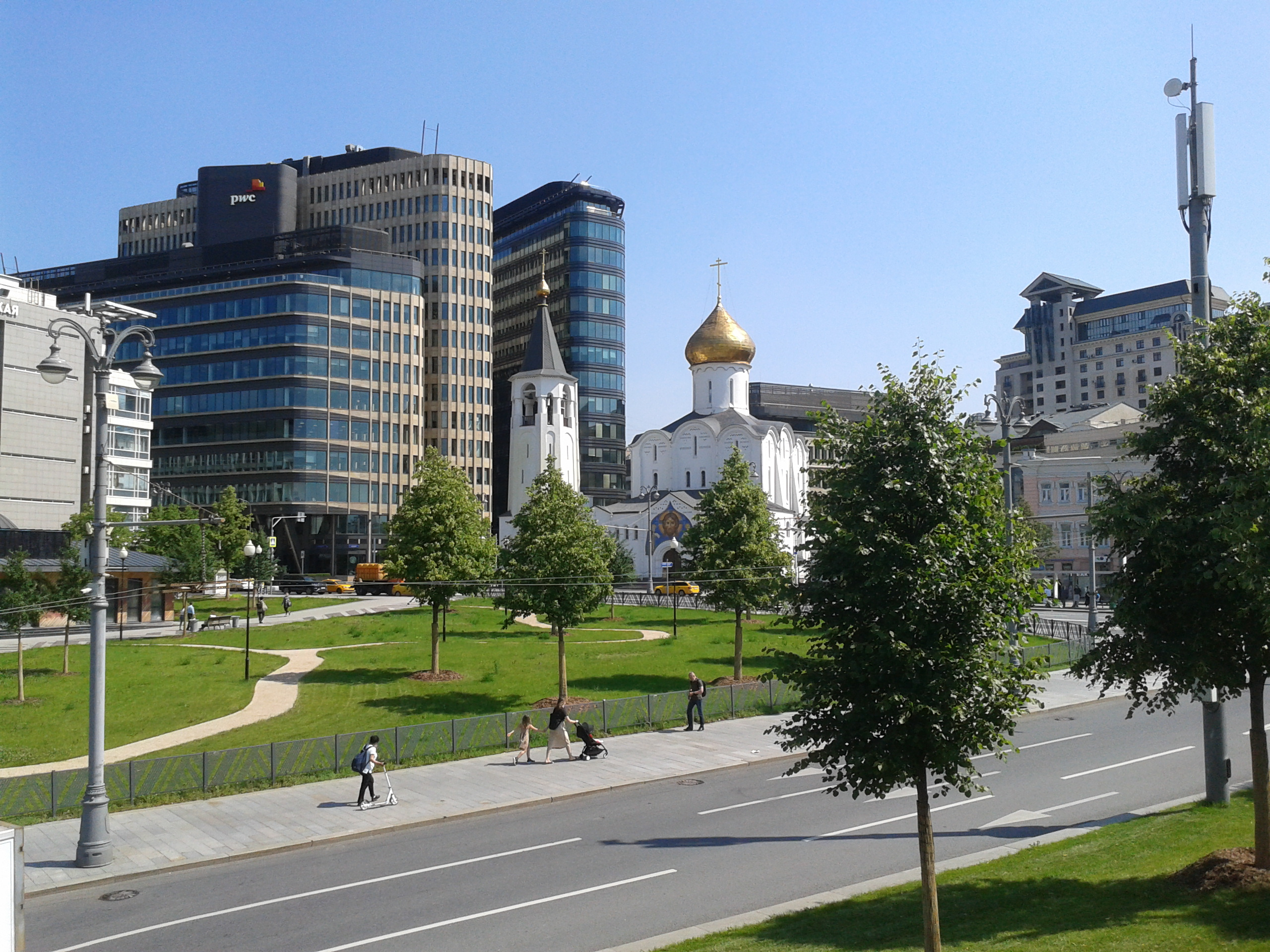

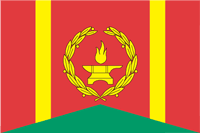
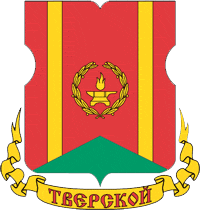
- Flag Coat of arms
- Coordinates: 55°46′N 37°36′E
- Country: Russia
- Federal subject: Moscow
- Time zone: UTC+3 (MSK)
- OKTMO ID: 45382000

Tverskoy and Kitai-gorod on the map of Moscow. As of 2007, Kitai-gorod is a separate territory governed directly by Central Administrative Okrug

Tverskoy District (Russian: Тверской район, IPA: [tvʲɪrˈskoj]) is a district of Central Administrative Okrug of the federal city of Moscow, Russia. Population: 75,378 (2010 Census); 75,955 (2002 Census).

The district extends from Kitai-gorod northwest to Belorussky and Savyolovsky Rail Terminals. Its southern boundary runs one or two city blocks south from Tverskaya Street; eastern boundary follows the track of the Neglinnaya River now flowing in a tunnel under Samotechnaya Street, Tsvetnoy Boulevard, and Neglinnaya Street. Tverskoy District houses State Duma, Federation Council, the Mayor of Moscow, Moscow City Council, and Moscow Police Headquarters. It contains Theatre Square, the business district of Tverskaya Street with Pushkin Square, Petrovka Street, Dmitrovka Street, and the western part of Kuznetsky Most. It has the highest concentration of theatres, including Bolshoi Theatre and the historical Pillar Hall of the House of the Unions.

Historical areas of Patriarshy Ponds, Malaya Bronnaya Street, and most of Tverskoy Boulevard, while closely associated with Tverskaya Street actually belong to Presnensky District. Since 2002 Tverskoy District also includes Kitai-gorod, which was once a separate territory managed directly by Central Administrative Okrug.

== History ==
=== Old Muscovy to 19th century ===
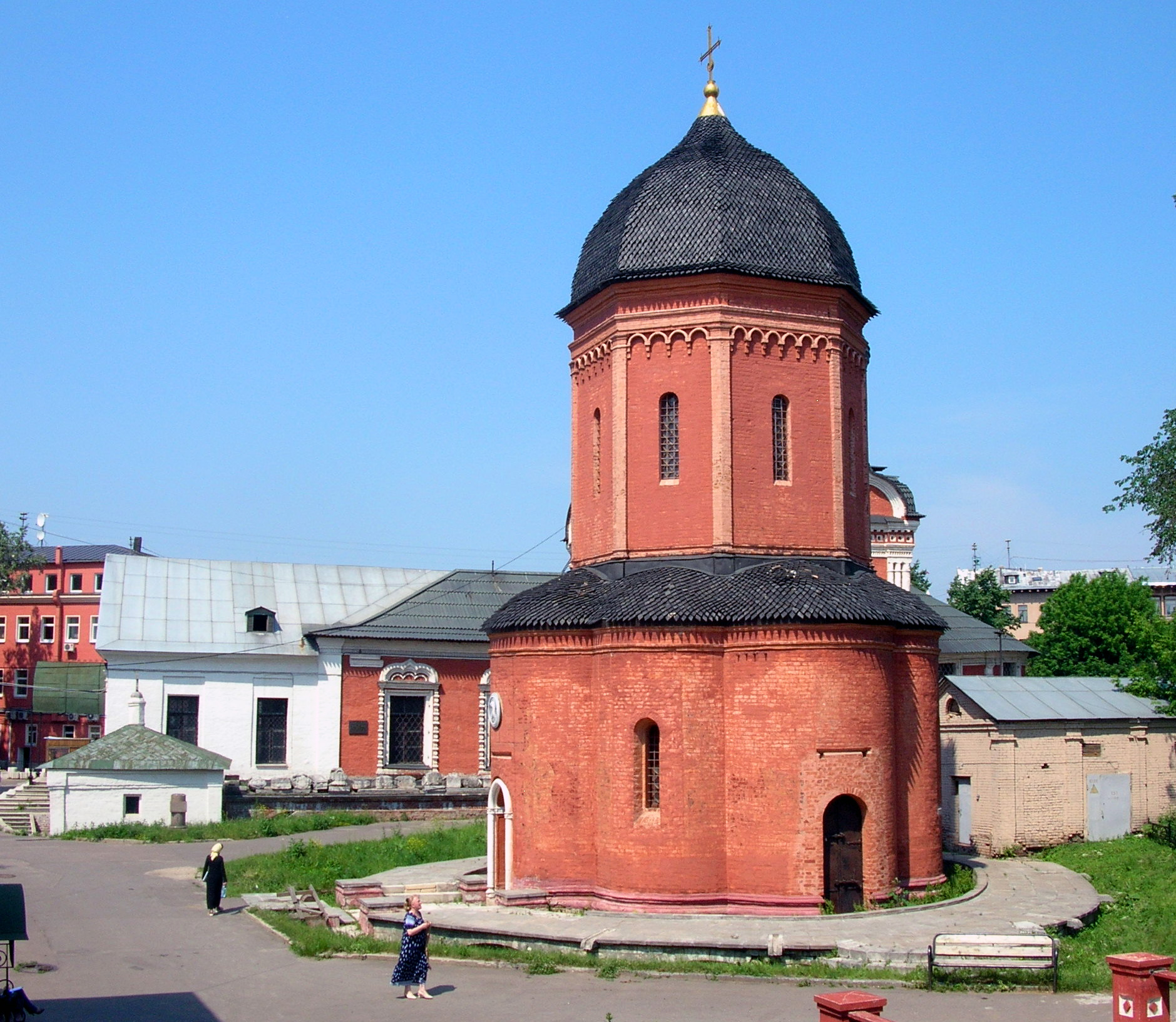
St. Peter's Cathedral, Vysokopetrovsky Monastery, ca. 1508

Tverskaya Street emerged, as the road to Tver, in the 12th century. Dmitrovka Street, the road to Dmitrov, and Petrovka Street, leading to Vysokopetrovsky Monastery, date back to the 14th century.

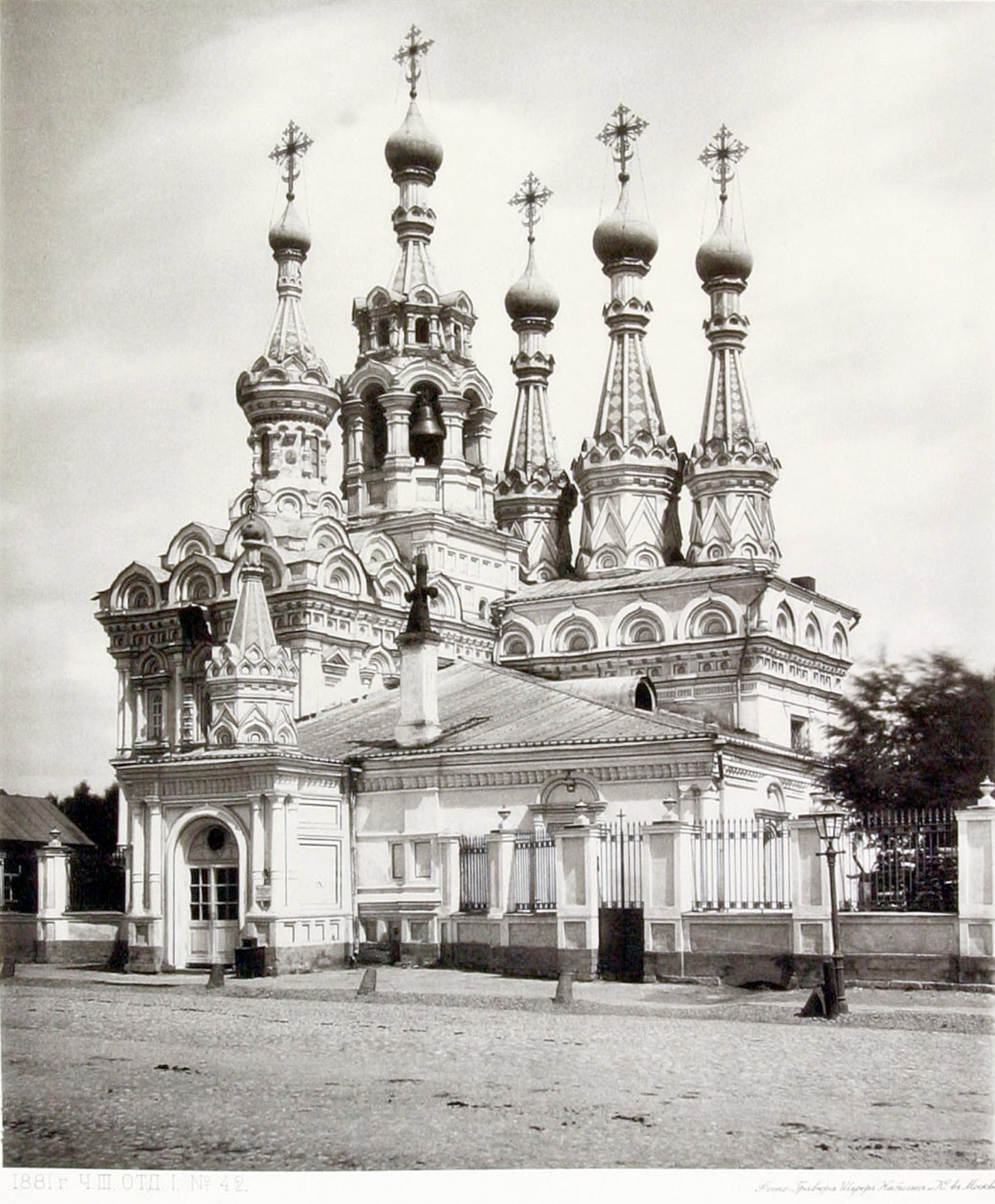
Church of Nativity in Putinki, 1650s

Until the 1820s, the territory of what is now Tverskoy District was separated from the Moscow Kremlin by the Neglinnaya River. Because of that, the city grew primarily eastward in the Middle Ages—into the Red Square and Kitai-Gorod—while the development of western territories lagged behind. A stone bridge connecting Tverskaya with the Red Square was built in 1595. Urban development in the western part concentrated along Tverskaya Street. In the late 15th century, it was built out with country-like wooden homes to Pushkin Square, and by the end of the 16th century the city extended beyond the present-day Garden Ring. First stone Boyar houses appeared in downtown Tverskaya around that time. In 1654, Strastnoy Monastery was set up in present-day Pushkin Square, and three years later, Odoyevsky family set up a stone mansion on the site of present-day Museum of Modern History (formerly Museum of Revolution), beyond the Bely Gorod walls.

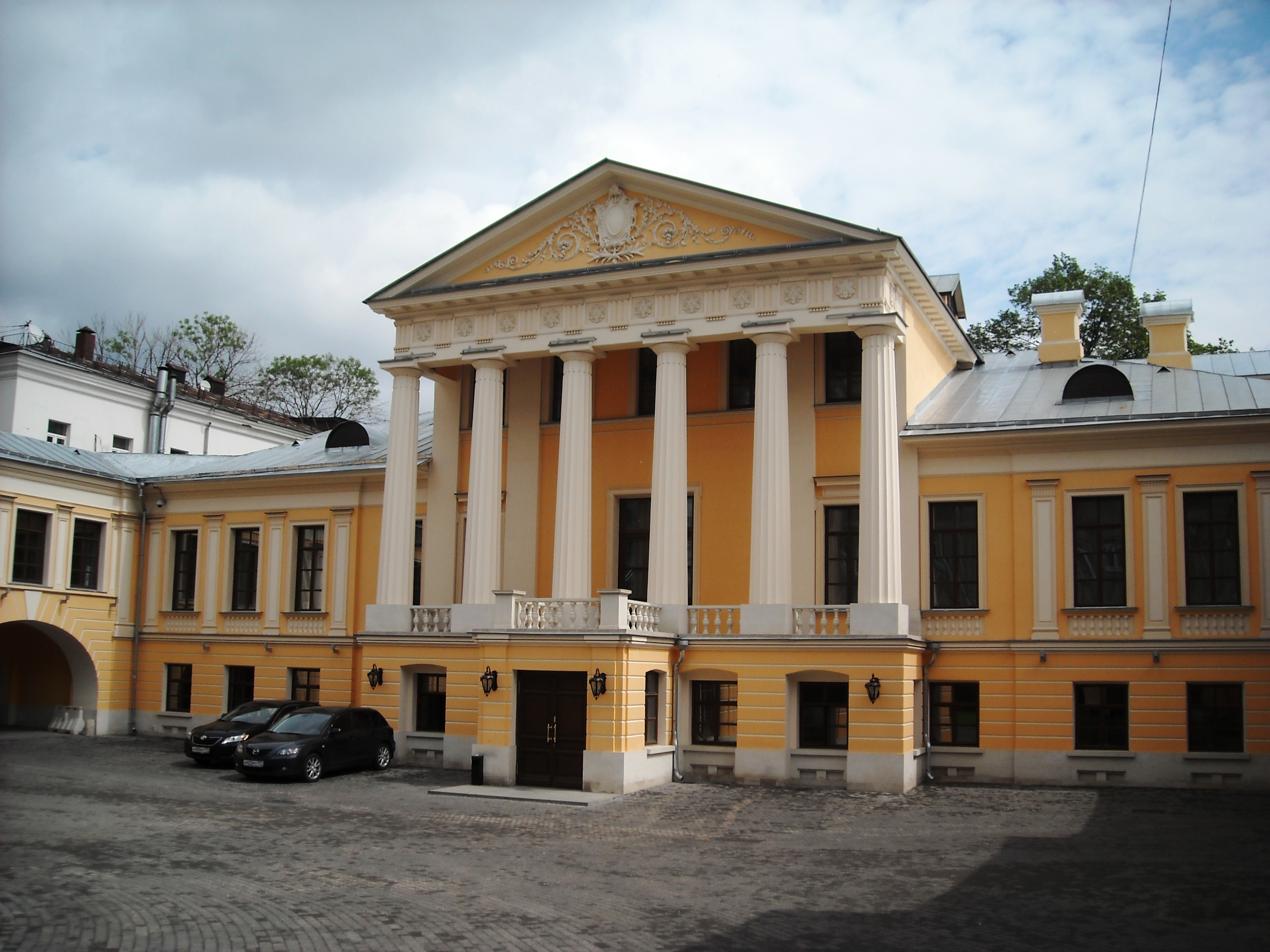
Dmitrovka Street

Dmitrovka Street also developed rapidly after the fire of 1648, as marked by the one-of-a-kind eight-tented church of Nativity in Putinki. Unusually for Moscow outskirts, it was financed by the State, as the church was located near the Embassy Inn (Посольский двор), home to foreign guests.

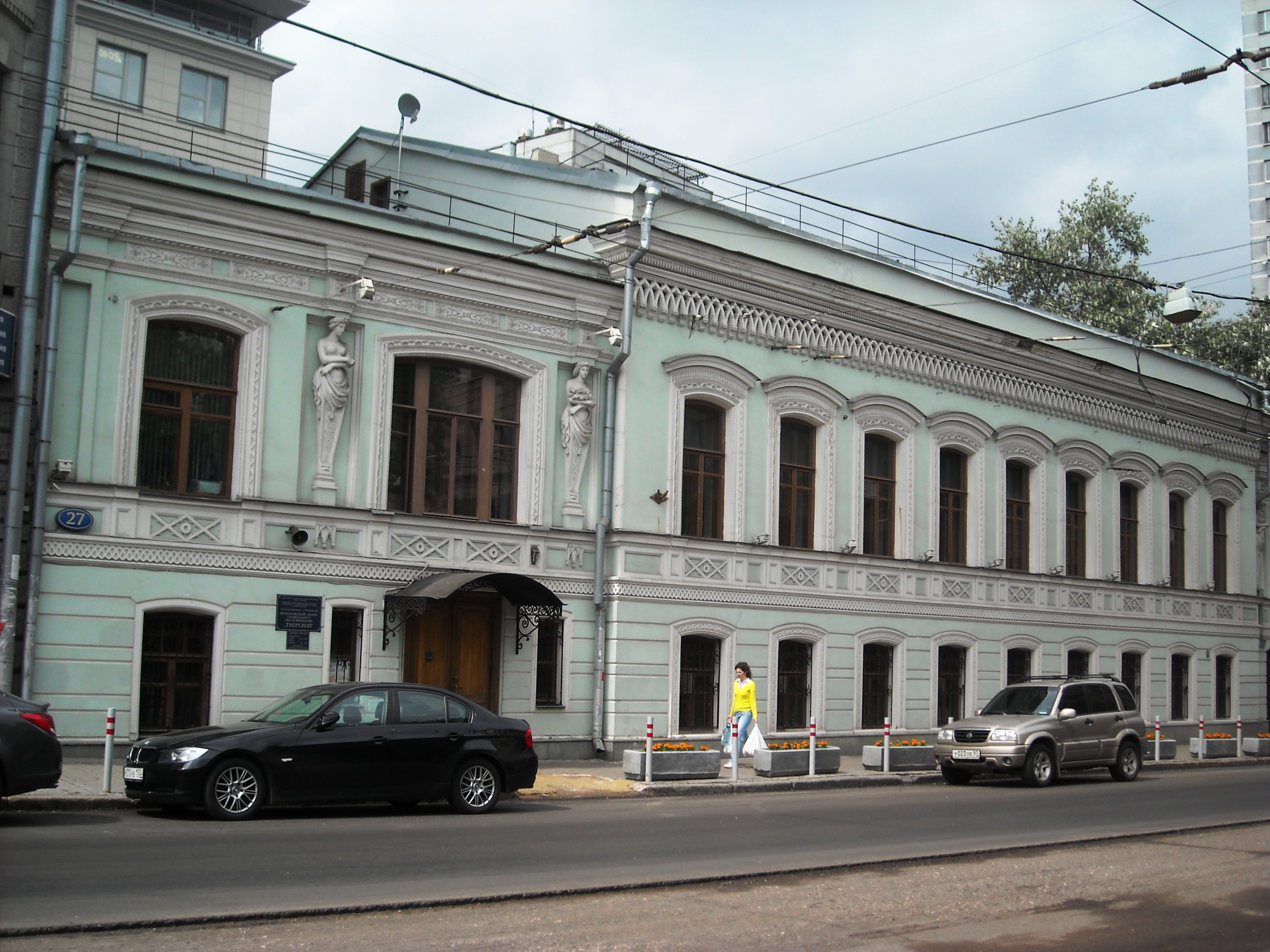
Dmitrovka Street

Peter the Great's move of the national capital to Saint Petersburg actually improved the leading role of Tverskaya Street, as it became the main road of royal journeys between two capitals. Tverskaya acquired Moscow's first triumphal arch (1703, giving name to Triumphalnaya Square), Gagarin family palace (1760s), and the Moscow City Hall Building (in different periods was known as Zakhar Chernyshyov mansion (1782); later the seat of Moscow Governor, Moscow City Council, and currently the seat of the Mayor of Moscow and the Government of Moscow (which was rebuilt in the 1940s). The Fire of 1812 wiped out wealthy mansions and peasant homes alike, sparing only the Pushkin Square; Tverskaya was rebuilt as an upper-class street.

Northeastern side of Tverskoy District (east of Petrovka Street) lagged behind Tverskaya Street and Moscow's east side due to frequent floods on the Neglinnaya River. First attempt to control the river, proposed in 1775 by Matvey Kazakov, materialized in 1792 Neglinnaya Canal, which was running parallel to the river. Once the canal was completed, the old river bed was filled with earth. In 1817–1819, the channel was covered with masonry vaults, locking the stream in a tunnel. This created Neglinnaya Street, the youngest street inside Boulevard Ring, but did not rule out future floods. The most recent flood, in 1973, led to complete rebuilding of the aging tunnel (1974–1989, see 1965 flood photos) Another legacy of the Neglinnaya river survives in Central Baths (1890) and Sandunovsky Baths (1896).

==== Theatre District ====
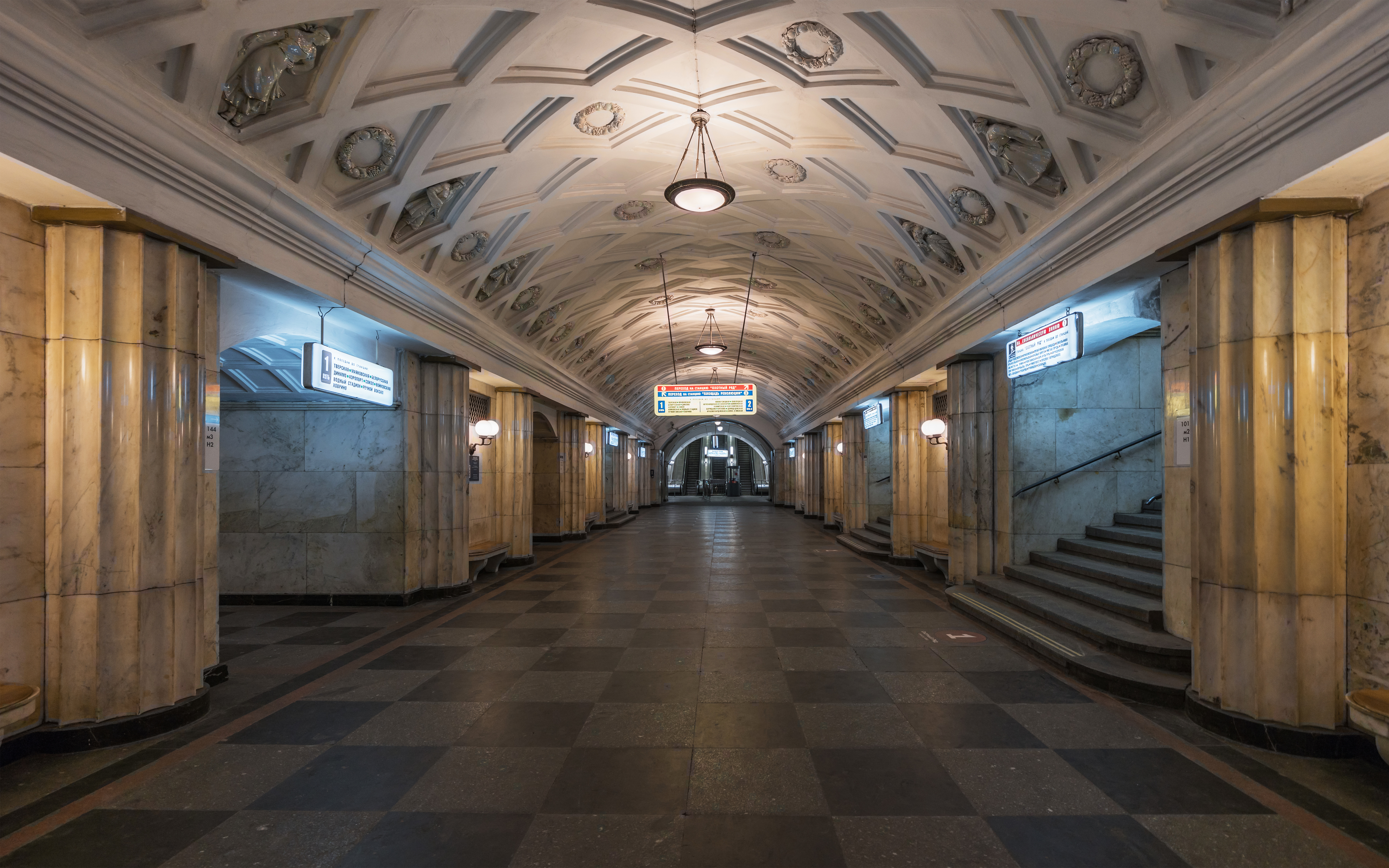
Theatre Square, Teatralnaya metro station

The first public theater, Petrovsky Teatr, was set up in 1780 by English entrepreneur Michael Maddox and Prince Urusov in present-day Theatre Square. It burned down in October 1805 after 425 successful shows. In 1825, Joseph Bove built a new, larger Bolshoi Theatre on the same site. By this time, downtown stretch of the Neglinnaya River was contained in a tunnel; Peter's bastions of Kitai-gorod were razed, forming the Theatre Square. In the same 1825, landowner Vargin built Maly Theatre on his own adjacent lot. For the first five years, the State leased the building from Vargin; he was later convicted of fraud and the State bought out the building in 1832. Owners of the opposite land lots were obliged to build houses exactly like Maly Theatre, forming a symmetrical neoclassical square with a parade ground and water fountain. The symmetry was eventually ruined by expansions in the 1870s, which added the third theatre—originally Bronnikov private theater (now Molodyozhny Theater).

Another historical hall, the Assembly of Nobility (now the House of the Unions) stands on the corner of Bolshaya Dmitrovka and Okhotny Ryad streets since 1790. The building, designed by Matvey Kazakov, was rebuilt externally, but the Pillar Hall inside it, famous for its acoustics, remains close to Kazakov's original design. When the State lifted the ban on private theatres in 1882, tradition continued with Moscow Art Theatre in Kamergersky Lane (1902–1909), Yermolova Theatre (1925), Hermitage (1883), and Aquarium (1898) park theatres, etc. Currently, Tverskoy District has nineteen repertory theatres, the Pillar Hall, Tchaikovsky Hall (1940), and Moscow Circus on Tsvetnoy Boulevard (originally Salamonovsky Circus, 1880, rebuilt in 1987–1989).

==== Industrial expansion ====
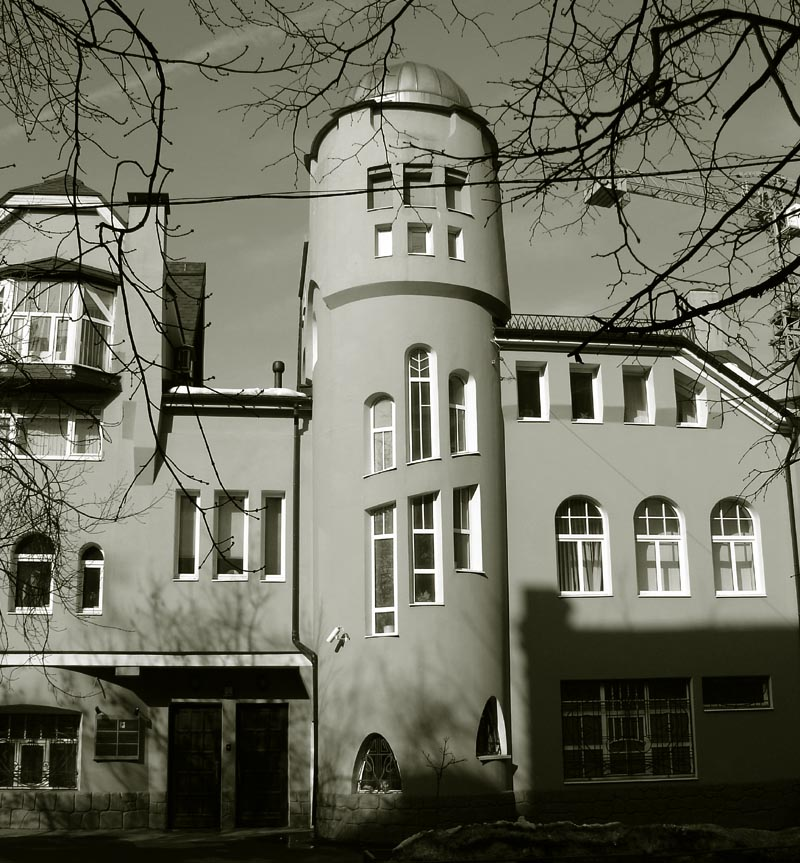
1907 Communal Club for working teenagers, funded by Nikolay Krotov, designed and managed by Alexander Zelenko and Stanislav Shatsky

Unlike Presnensky or Basmanny Districts, Tverskoy has, and always had, very few industrial properties. However, its northern part, beyond Garden Ring, developed into a working-class neighborhood in line with the 19th-century industrialization. Development began in the 18th century with the Butyrka prison (rebuilt to a castle shape in 1800). For the next hundred years, the territories around the prison were filled with farms and small wooden homes. Things changed with the construction of railroads—Smolensk railroad station was built in 1870; current building, known as Belorussky Rail Terminal, was completed in 1909. Savyolovsky Rail Terminal and Moscow Ring Railroad followed in the 1900s. Territories near the railroads were used for factories, cheap housing for workers followed soon.

Miusskaya Square, located three blocks from Belorussky Terminal, was a site of unusual urban development, a new center of blue-collar social life. In the course of one decade, 1904–1914, the city and private sponsors built Abrikosova Hospital and Nursery (1906), Junior High School (1912), Shanyavsky University (1913), kindergartens, and trade schools. Development of similar social hubs in other working districts lagged behind and terminated with World War I and Russian Revolution of 1917.

==== Modern history ====
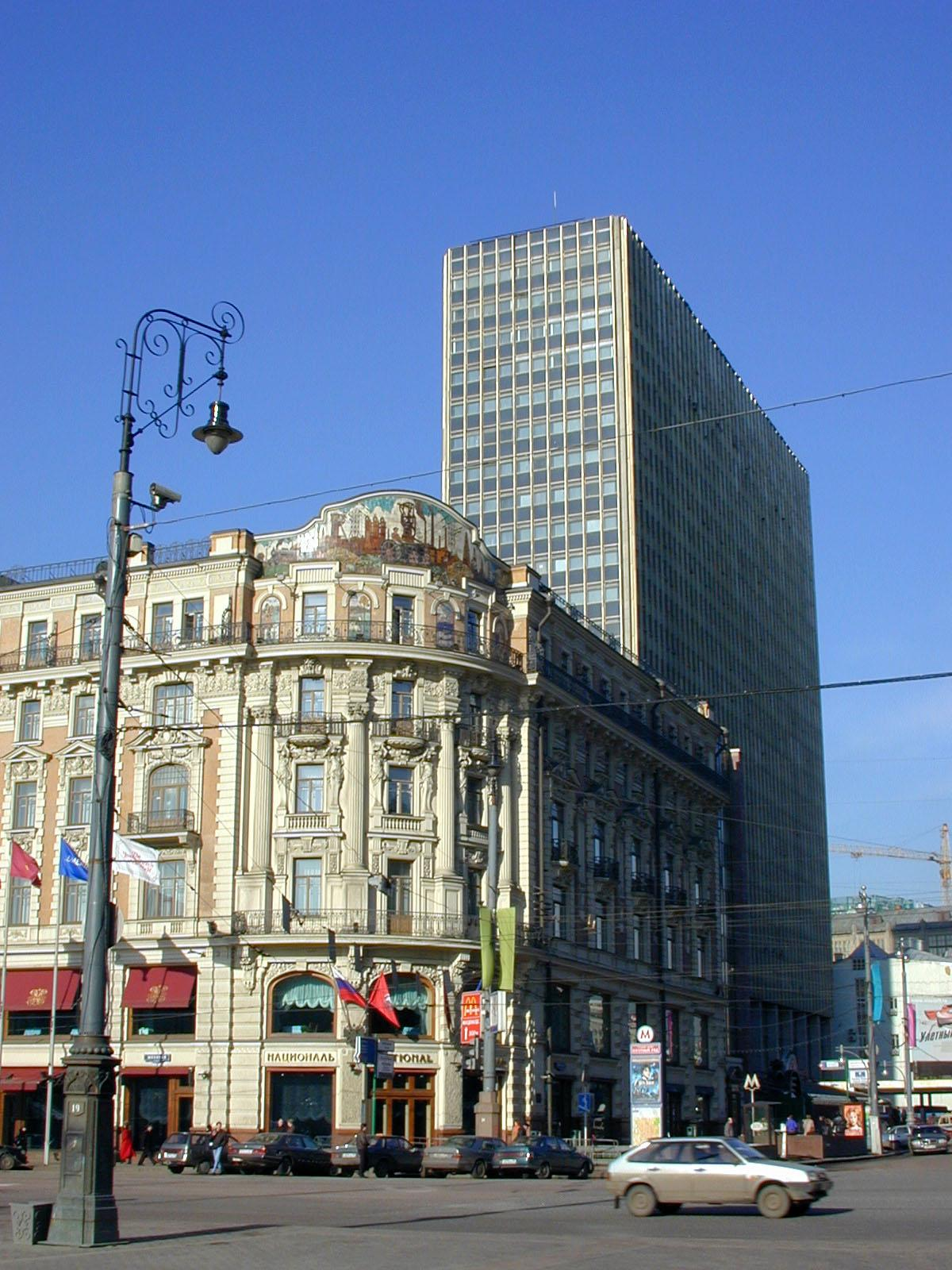
Corner of Manege Square: extant National Hotel and demolished Intourist Hotel (1970–2002)

Redevelopment of Tverskaya Street began in the late 1920s with infill buildings like Ivan Rerberg's Central Telegraph (1927), and Grigory Barkhin's Izvestia building in Pushkin Square (1927). This was followed by demolition of Okhotny Ryad and Manege Square.

Major reconstruction of Tverskaya Street began in 1937 with demolition of Strastnoy Monastery and dozens of smaller buildings. Three buildings, including Savvinskoye Podvorye, Mossovet building, and the Eye Clinic, were spared from demolition and moved to new foundations farther from the street. As a result, Savvinskoye Podvorye is now completely locked inside a 1930s stalinist block. Another building, a print shop at Pushkin Square, was moved in the 1970s to make way for Izvestia expansion.

Design of the first stretch of new Gorky Street (the name of Tverskaya since 1935) was awarded to Arkady Mordvinov, 1929 graduate in architecture known for his ultra-left public statements. Mordvinov proved himself a good project manager, successfully testing so-called flow method of fast-track construction. By 1941, most of central Gorky Street was completed; the rest was built out after World War II.

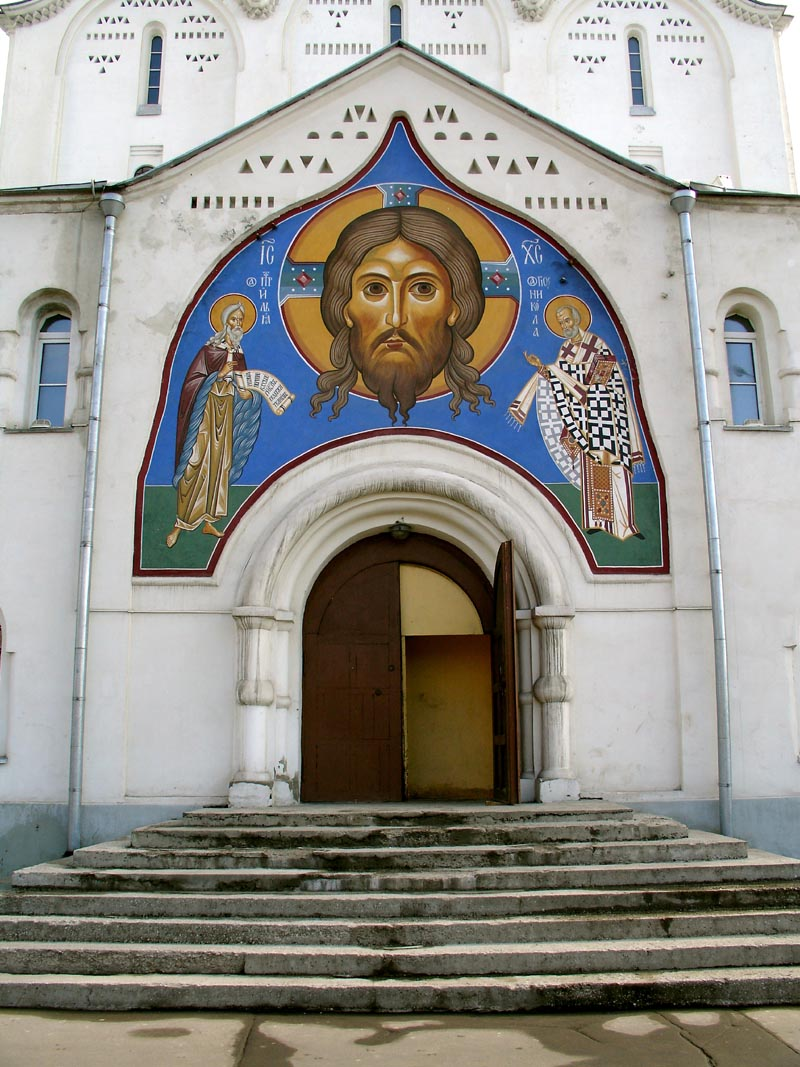
Contemporary Old Believers murals near Belorussky Terminal

In the 1970s, the street acquired Brezhnev-era boxlike buildings of 22-story Hotel Intourist (1970, demolished in 2002) and smaller Minsk Hotel (1964, demolished in 2005) and New Izvestia building; less controversial pseudo-stalinist infill buildings followed in the 1980s and late 1990s. However, outside Tverskaya, historical buildings and neighborhoods were being demolished throughout the 1990s and 2000s. Many blocks in the Novoslobodskaya station area are already rebuilt as post-2000 highrises. The City has declared plans to reconstruct Pushkin Square and Belorussky Terminal Square with multi-level tunnels, shopping space, and parking, but those plans were later abolished with mayor resignation.

Population of Tverskoy District is traditionally affluent and educated, with a substantial share of foreigners (most of them are not included in official population count). Its ethnic mix, changing rapidly since the 1980s, has high shares of Tatars, Armenians and Jews; once-strong Ukrainian community has dispersed. Like all Central Okrug population, Tverskoy residents have life expectancy of three to four years higher than other Muscovites, attributed to better education and social status.

== Government and infrastructure ==
The Ministry of Education and Science has its head office in the district. For their role in the Sergei Magnitsky case, several judges of the Tverskoy District Court are subject to the American Magnitsky Act sanctions, prohibiting their entrance to the United States and use of the US banking system.

== Economy ==
Korean Air operates its CIS office in the district.

== Notable buildings, cultural, and educational facilities ==
- Butyrskaya tyurma

=== Public transportation access ===
- Teatralnaya, Okhotny Ryad, Kuznetsky Most - city center
- Pushkinskaya, Chekhovskaya, Tverskaya - Pushkin Square
- Mayakovskaya
- Belorusskaya-Radialnaya, Belorusskaya-Koltsevaya - Belorussky Rail Terminal and Miusskaya Square
- Tsvetnoy Boulevard
- Mendeleyevskaya, Novoslobodskaya - Miusskaya Square
- Savyolovskaya (Bolshaya Koltsevaya line), Savyolovskaya (Serpukhovsko–Timiryazevskaya line) - Savyolovsky Rail Terminal (northern extremity)
