= Chekhovskaya =

Moscow Metro station

Chekhovskaya Чеховская
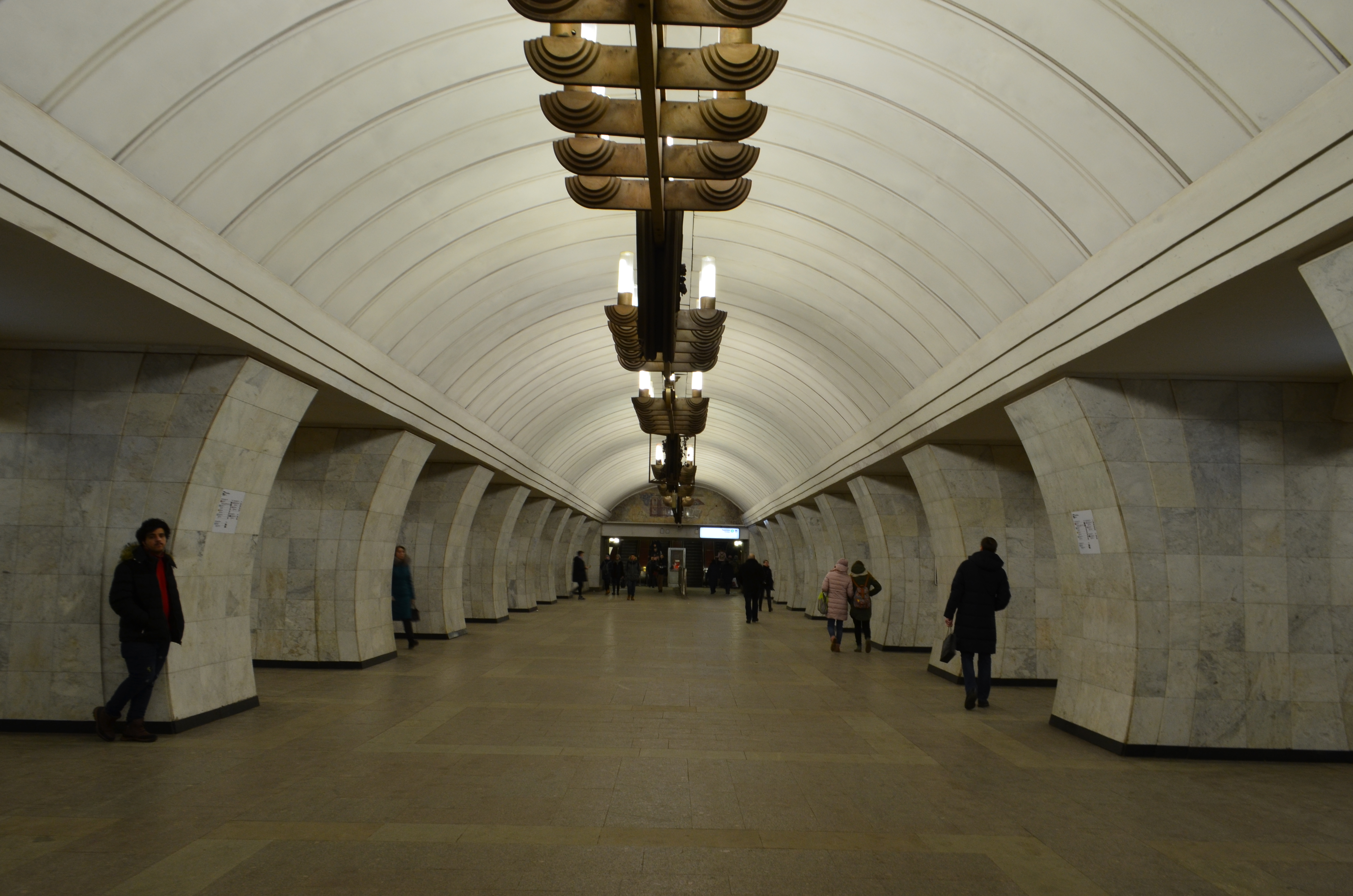

General information
- Location: Tverskoy District; Central Administrative Okrug; Moscow; Russia
- Coordinates: 55.7644°N 37.6097°E
- System: Moscow Metro station
- Owner: Moskovsky Metropoliten
- Line: Serpukhovsko-Timiryazevskaya line
- Platforms: 1
- Tracks: 2

Construction
- Structure type: Deep-level pylon three-vault station
- Depth: 62 metres (203 ft)
- Platform levels: 1
- Parking: No

History
- Opened: 31 December 1987; 38 years ago

Services
Preceding station	Moscow Metro	Following station
Tsvetnoy Bulvar towards Altufyevo	Serpukhovsko-Timiryazevskaya line	Borovitskaya towards Bulvar Dmitriya Donskogo
Barrikadnaya towards Planernaya	Tagansko-Krasnopresnenskaya line transfer at Pushkinskaya	Kuznetsky Most towards Kotelniki
Mayakovskaya towards Khovrino	Zamoskvoretskaya line transfer at Tverskaya	Teatralnaya towards Alma-Atinskaya
Route map
Location
- Location within Central Moscow

Chekhovskaya (Russian: Чеховская) is a station of the Serpukhovsko-Timiryazevskaya Line of the Moscow Metro. It was opened on December 31, 1987, and served as the northern terminus of the line for the following year. Its depth is 62 metres (203 ft). The vestibule is located in Pushkinskaya Square, while the station is named for the writer Anton Chekhov. It was the deepest station in Moscow Metro from 1987 until 1991.

== Transfers ==
The station provides transfers to the Tverskaya station of the Zamoskvoretskaya Line, and the Pushkinskaya station of the Tagansko-Krasnopresnenskaya Line.

== Gallery ==
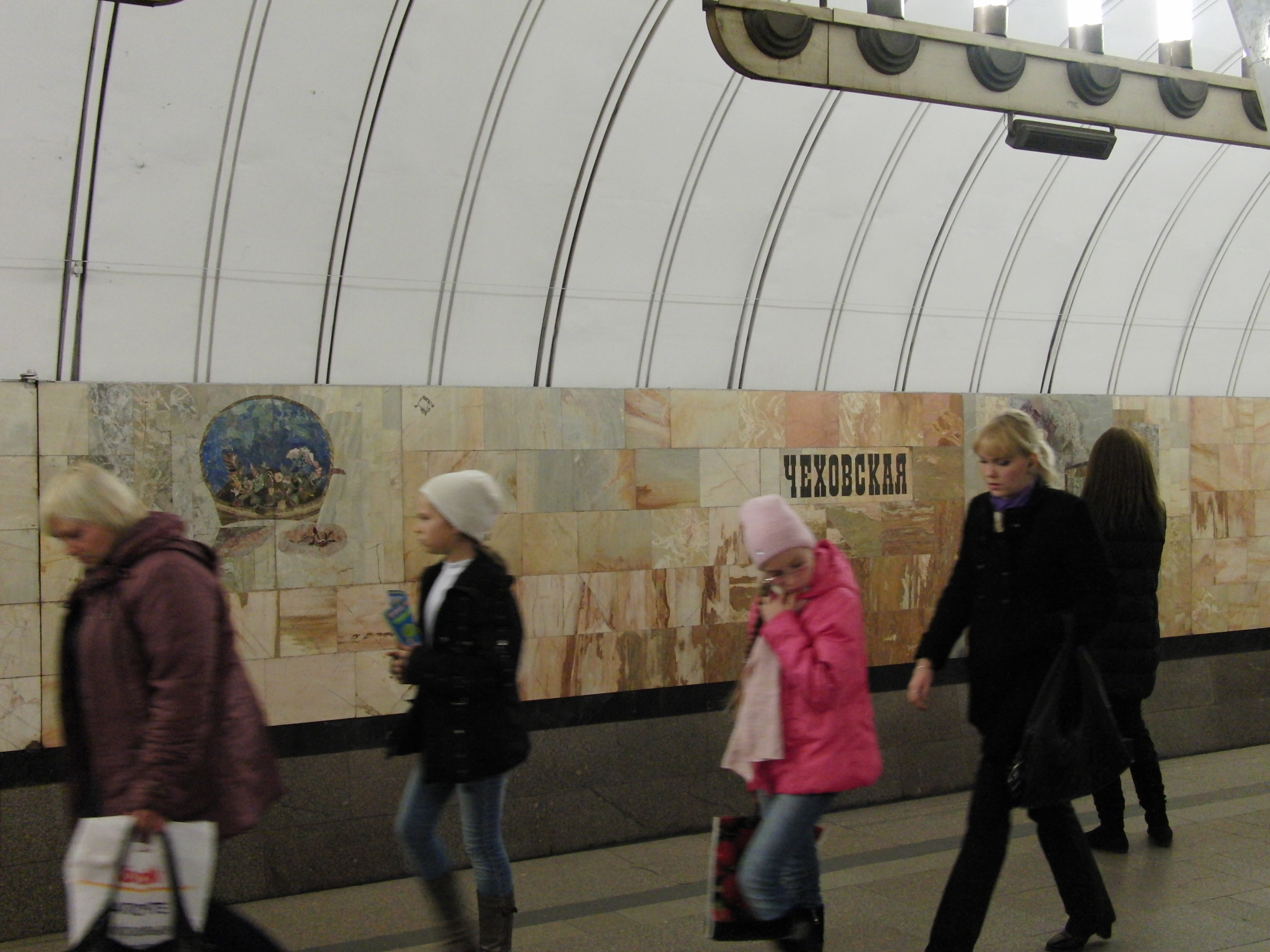
Platform

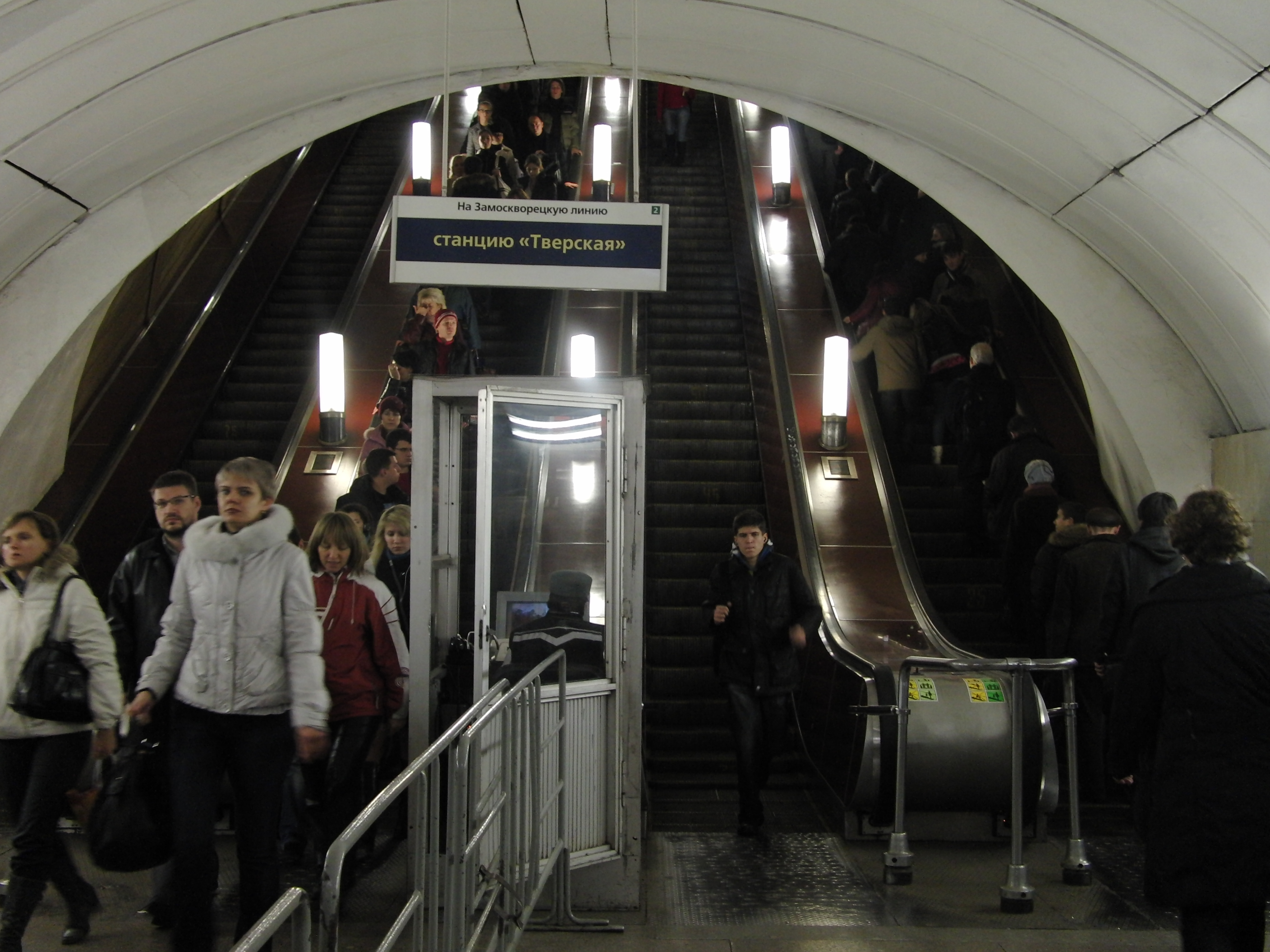
The transfer to Tverskaya served by the Zamoskvoretskaya Line
