= Pushkinskaya Square =

Square in Tverskoy District, Moscow

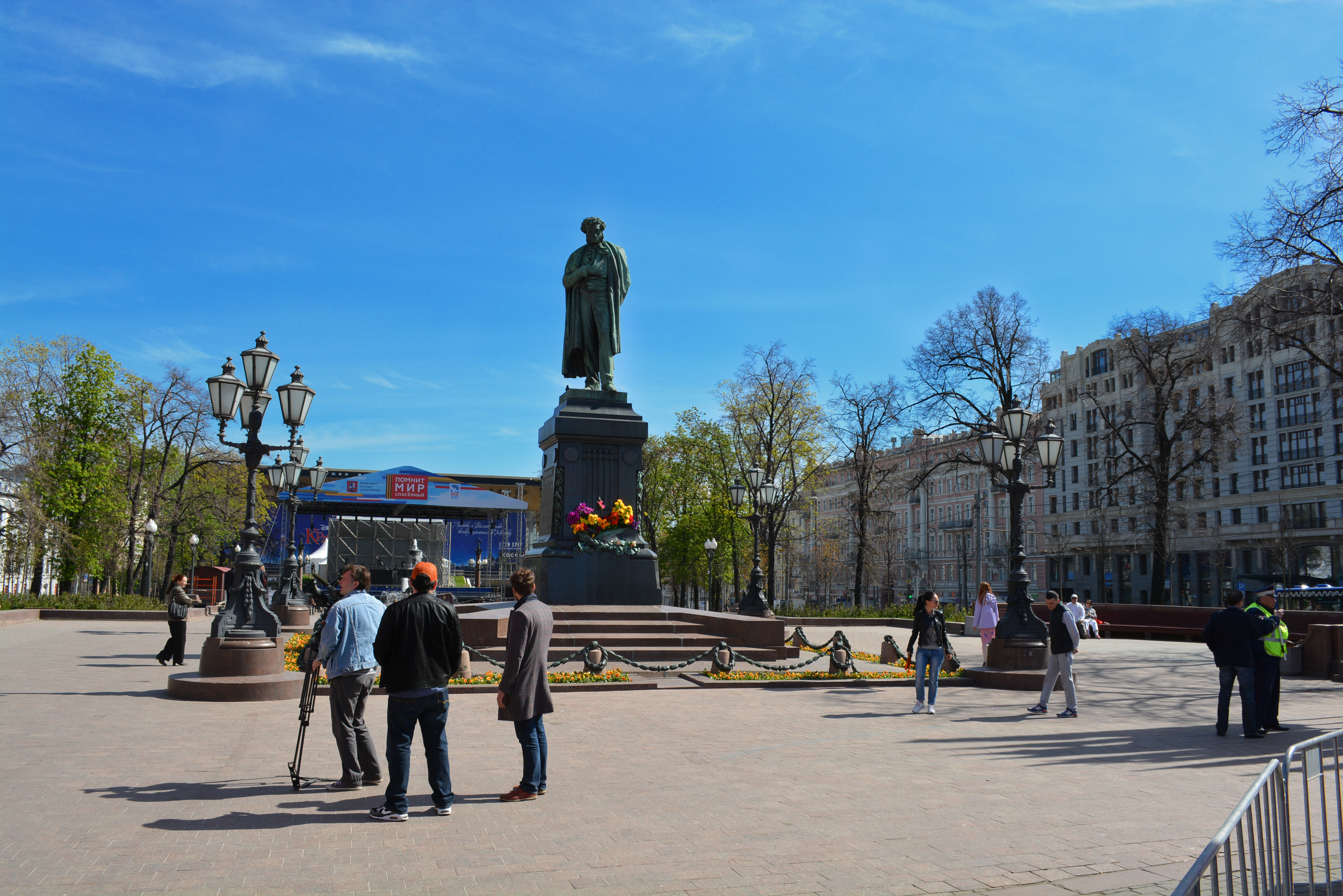
- Pushkinskaya Square in May 2015
- Interactive map of Pushkinskaya Square
- Native name: Пушкинская площадь (Russian)
- Location: Moscow; Central Administrative Okrug; Tverskoy District
- Nearest metro station: Tverskaya; Pushkinskaya; Chekhovskaya
- Coordinates: 55°45′56″N 37°36′21″E

Pushkinskaya Square or Pushkin Square (Russian: Пу́шкинская пло́щадь) is a pedestrian open space in the Tverskoy District in central Moscow. Historically, it was known as Strastnaya Square (Russian: Страстная площадь) before being renamed for Alexander Pushkin in 1937.

It is located at the junction of the Boulevard Ring (Tverskoy Boulevard to the southwest and Strastnoy Boulevard to the northeast) and Tverskaya Street, 2 kilometres (1.2 mi) northwest of the Kremlin. It is not only one of the busiest city squares in Moscow, but also one of the busiest in the world.

The former Strastnaya Square name originates from the Passion Monastery (Russian: Страстной монастырь, Strastnoy Monastery), which was demolished in the 1930s by the Soviet regime.

At the center of the square is a statue of Pushkin, funded by public subscription and unveiled by Ivan Turgenev and Fyodor Dostoyevsky in 1880. In 1950, Joseph Stalin had the statue moved to the other side of the Tverskaya Street, where the historic Passion Monastery had formerly stood. On 5 December 1965, Glasnost Meeting, the first spontaneous public political demonstration in the Soviet Union after the Second World War, took place here. In January 1990, the first McDonald's restaurant in Soviet Union and largest one in the world at that time opened here.
