= Tverskaya (Moscow Metro) =

Moscow Metro station

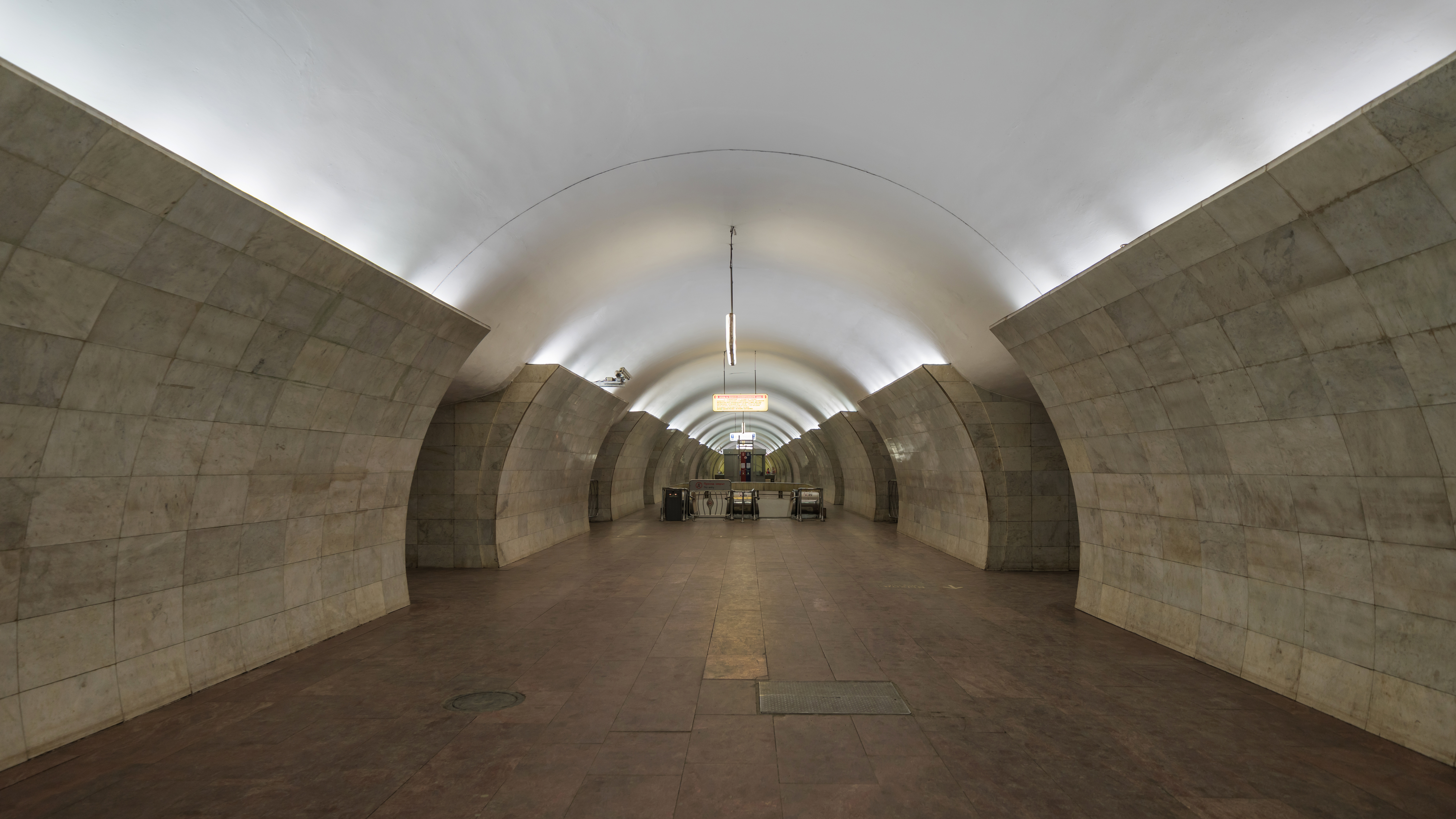

General information
- Location: Tverskoy District; Central Administrative Okrug; Moscow; Russia
- Coordinates: 55.7647°N 37.6065°E
- System: Moscow Metro station
- Owner: Moskovsky Metropoliten
- Line: Zamoskvoretskaya line
- Platforms: 1 island platform
- Tracks: 2
- Connections: Bus: м1, м5, м40, е30, с344, с511; night routes: н1, н12

Construction
- Depth: 42 metres (138 ft)
- Platform levels: 1
- Parking: No

Other information
- Station code: 033

History
- Opened: 20 July 1979; 47 years ago
- Former names: Gorkovskaya (1979—1990)

Services
Preceding station	Moscow Metro	Following station
Mayakovskaya towards Khovrino	Zamoskvoretskaya line	Teatralnaya towards Alma-Atinskaya
Barrikadnaya towards Planernaya	Tagansko-Krasnopresnenskaya line transfer at Pushkinskaya	Kuznetsky Most towards Kotelniki
Tsvetnoy Bulvar towards Altufyevo	Serpukhovsko-Timiryazevskaya line transfer at Chekhovskaya	Borovitskaya towards Bulvar Dmitriya Donskogo
Route map
Location
- Location within Central Moscow

Tverskaya (Russian: Тверская) is a station on Moscow Metro's Zamoskvoretskaya line. The station is along Tverskaya Street under Pushkin Square in Moscow. From its opening in 1979 until 1990, it was named Gorkovskaya, which was the name of Tverskaya Street during the Soviet times. After the government restored the Tverskaya name in 1990, the station's name was changed accordingly.

The station was originally planned to open in 1938 along with the rest of the Gorkovsky radius of the second stage of the Metro. However this was abandoned and a provision of a straight tunnel, with a reinforced structure was left. However upon the change in the Metro development plans in the early 1960s, the city included a transfer station on the line. As a result, in 1975, after the opening of Pushkinskaya station, construction on Tverskaya began. The design marked a real engineering achievement, as the central hall, and the passenger platforms were built without any disruption to the service.

== Design ==
The decoration is dedicated to the works of the author Maxim Gorky, and architects R. Semerdzhiev, B. Thor, N. Shreter and V. Cheremin made best to simultaneously show the revolutionary constructivism shapes of flared pylons and plastered ceiling thus leaving the engineering achievement visible. White marble was used for pylons and walls and red granite for the floor. Originally the end of the station was decorated with a sculptural composition dedicated to the theme of his works. However, in 1987 after the opening of a transfer with Chekhovskaya, the composition was moved to the escalator lobby in the transfer. Transfer to Pushkinskaya is achieved through the two underplatform passageways, and via the vestibule under the Pushkin square which they share.

== 2000 Bomb Attack ==
In August 2000, a homemade bomb was detonated in the walkway leading to Pushkin Square. Seven victims were killed at the scene and six others died in hospitals. The explosion injured 118 others. The initial criminal investigation that followed blamed several criminal groups that were battling for the rights to operate retail kiosks in the walkway. Later, prosecutors looked at groups associated with Achemez Gochiyayev and Arbi Barayev. No one was brought to trial for the attack.

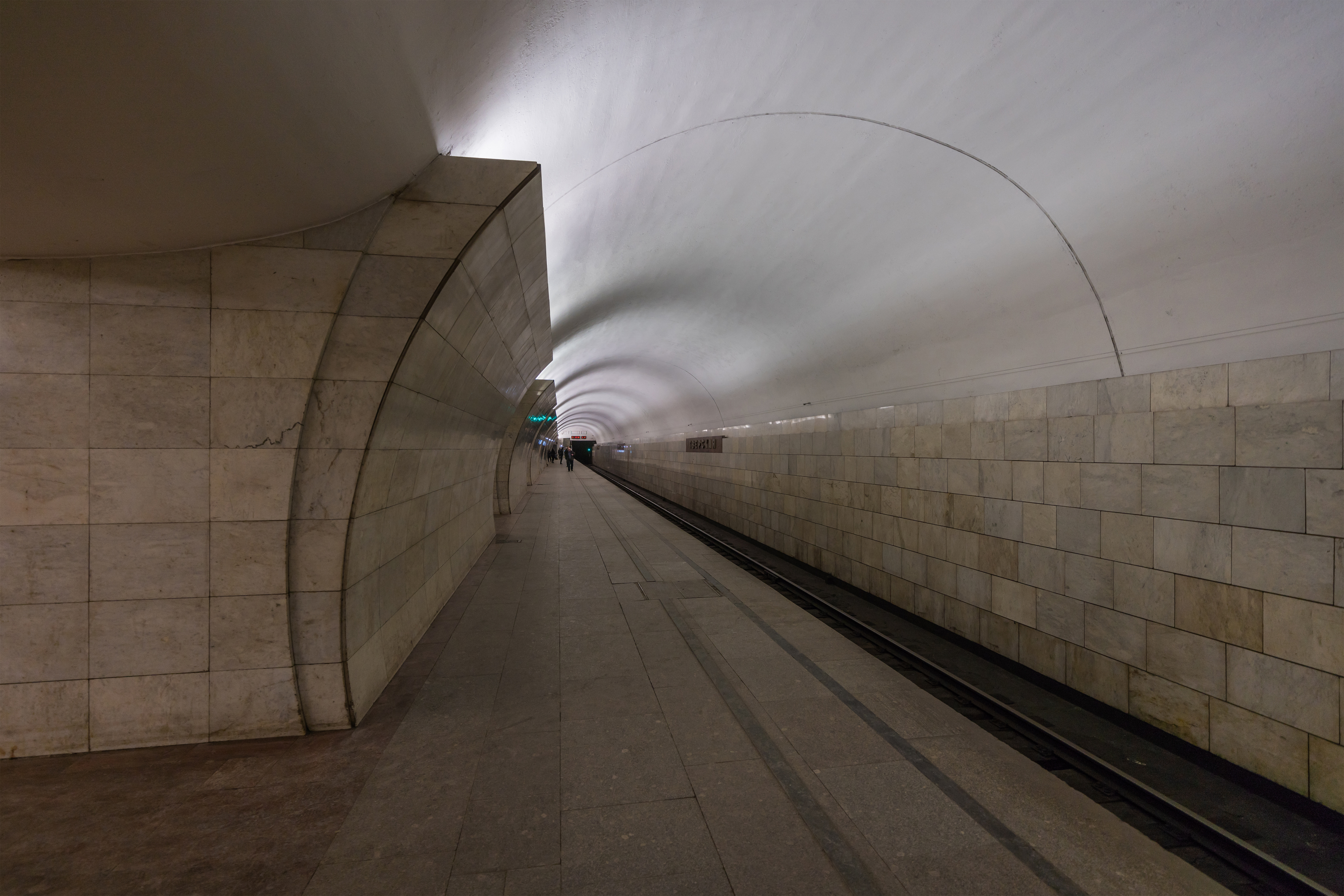
Station platform of Tverskaya station

== See also ==
- Moscow Metro
- Zamoskvoretskaya line
- Tverskaya Street
