= Mayakovskaya (Moscow Metro) =

Moscow Metro station

Mayakovskaya Маяковская
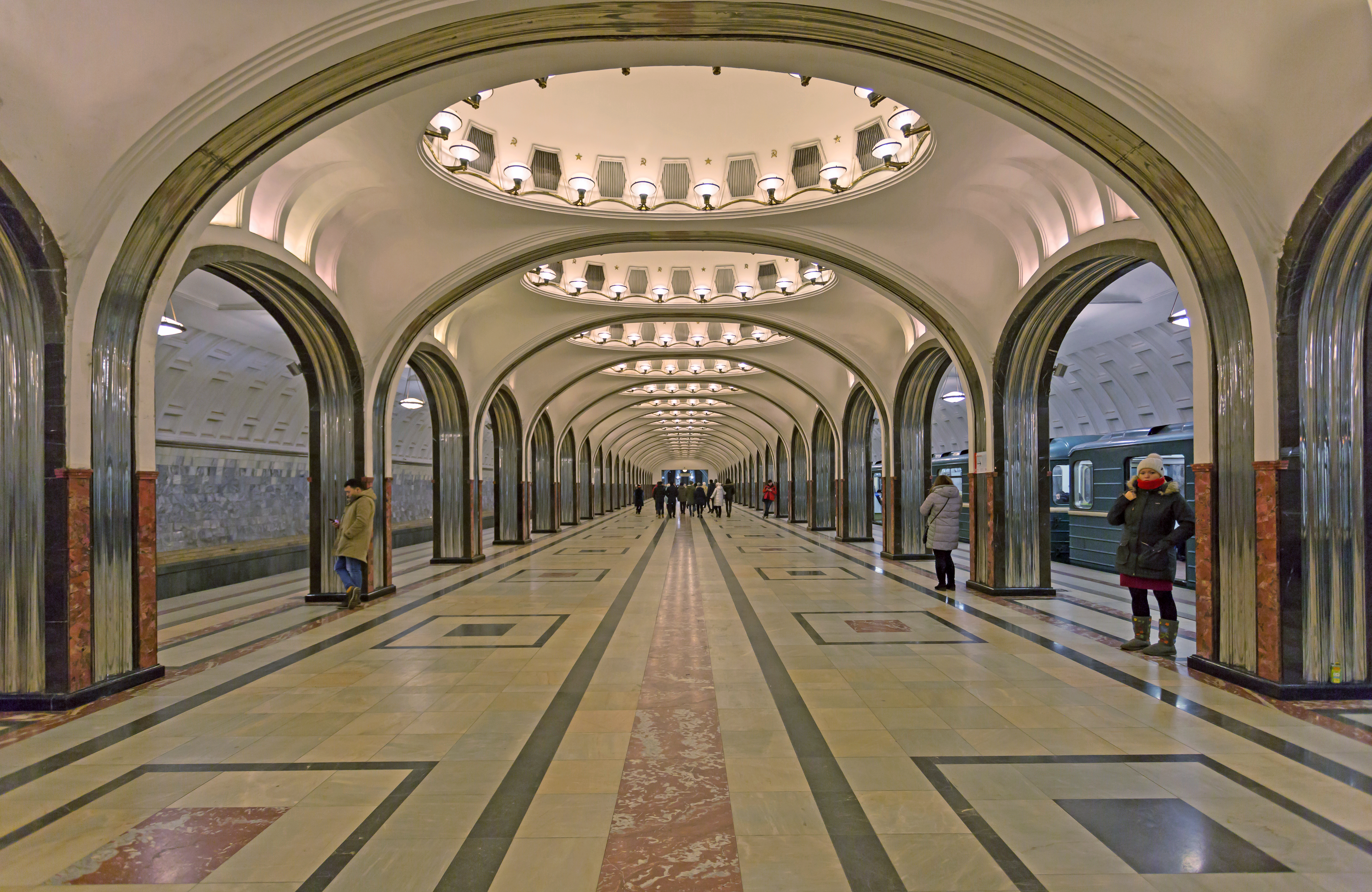

General information
- Location: Tverskoy District; Central Administrative Okrug; Moscow; Russia
- Coordinates: 55.7701°N 37.5958°E
- System: Moscow Metro station
- Owner: Moskovsky Metropoliten
- Line: Zamoskvoretskaya line
- Platforms: 1 island platform
- Tracks: 2
- Connections: Bus: м1, е30, 239, с369, с543, Б (along the Garden ring); night routes: н1, н12

Construction
- Depth: 33 metres (108 ft)
- Platform levels: 1
- Parking: No
- Architect: Alexey Dushkin
- Architectural style: Stalinist architecture

Other information
- Station code: 034

History
- Opened: 11 September 1938; 88 years ago
- Former names: Triumfalnaya ploshchad, Ploshchad Mayakovskogo

Services
Preceding station	Moscow Metro	Following station
Belorusskaya towards Khovrino	Zamoskvoretskaya line	Tverskaya towards Alma-Atinskaya
Route map
Location
- Location within Central Moscow

Mayakovskaya (Russian: Маяковская) is a Moscow Metro station on the Zamoskvoretskaya Line, in the Tverskoy District of central Moscow, Russia.

The station is named after the poet Vladimir Mayakovsky, and its design references Futurism, of which he was a prominent Russian exponent. It is often cited as one of the most beautiful stations in the system, and is an example of pre-World War II Stalinist architecture. It is best known for its ceiling mosaics by Alexander Deyneka, originally 35 in number, and collectively titled "Twenty-Four Hours in the Land of the Soviets". During World War II, it was used as a command post for Moscow's anti-aircraft regiment.

== History ==
The station was built as part of the second stage of the Moscow Metro expansion, opening on 11 September 1938. Whereas the first stage had focused on building the system itself, the stations of the second stage were far more ambitious, both architecturally and in engineering terms. As a result, the earlier stations appear modest by comparison. Mayakovskaya was the first deep-level column station in the Moscow Metro: instead of the three-vault pylon layout used at earlier deep stations, its central vault is supported by two rows of columns, one on each side.

Located 33 metres beneath the surface, the station became famous during World War II when it served as an air-raid shelter. On 6 November 1941, the eve of the 24th anniversary of the October Revolution, Joseph Stalin addressed a meeting of the Moscow City Council held in the central hall of the station. According to the historian Robert Service, Stalin lived in the station for a time during the war.

At the 1939 New York World's Fair the Soviet Pavilion included a life-size showcase copy of this station, whose designer Alexey Dushkin was awarded the Grand Prize.

== Design ==
Alexey Dushkin's Art Deco architecture was based on a Soviet future as envisioned by the poet Mayakovsky. The station features streamlined columns faced with stainless steel and pink rhodonite, walls of white Ufaley marble and grey diorite, a flooring pattern of white and pink marble, and 35 niches, one for each vault. The niches are surrounded by filament lights.

The station's design and Deyneka's mosaics take flight as their theme, presenting the station as a celebration of Soviet mastery of the skies. Mayakovskaya was the first Metro station to use facings of stainless steel, a material then associated with aircraft design. Dushkin and his chief engineer consulted the aircraft designer A. I. Putilov on how to work with it. Instead of the smooth barrel vaults of the earlier stations, the ceiling consists of a series of groin vaults pierced by oval apertures, each rising to a cupola containing a mosaic. The 35 mosaics were produced to Deyneka's designs by the mosaic studio of the Leningrad Academy of Arts under V. Frolov. They follow a day in sequence along the platform, from morning at one end to the following morning at the other, and about three-quarters of them depict flight and aircraft, including the TB-3 bomber, parachutists and aerial sports such as diving and pole-vaulting.

On 2 September 2005, a second northern exit was opened, with a new surface vestibule built into an office building at the corner of 1st Tverskaya-Yamskaya Street and 1st Tverskoy-Yamskoy Lane. The bust of Mayakovsky by the sculptor Alexander Kibalnikov was moved to the new vestibule. Passengers using the new exit descend a short escalator to an intermediate underground hall, and then take a long escalator to the surface. New mosaics were created for the exit, which also make extensive use of marble and stainless steel. The ceiling of the vestibule is decorated with a mosaic inspired by Mayakovsky's poem "Moscow Sky".

== Gallery ==
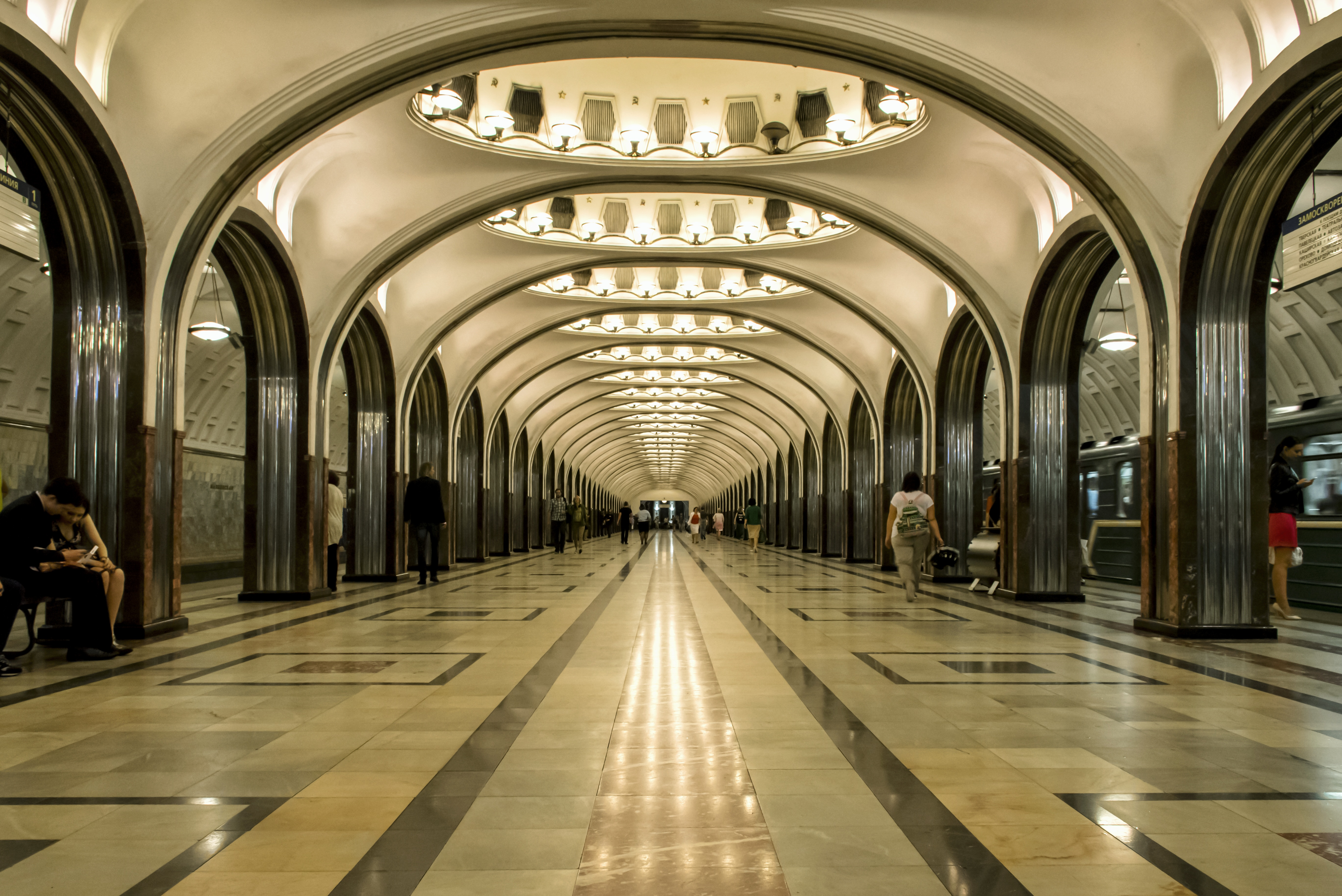
Mayakovskaya station

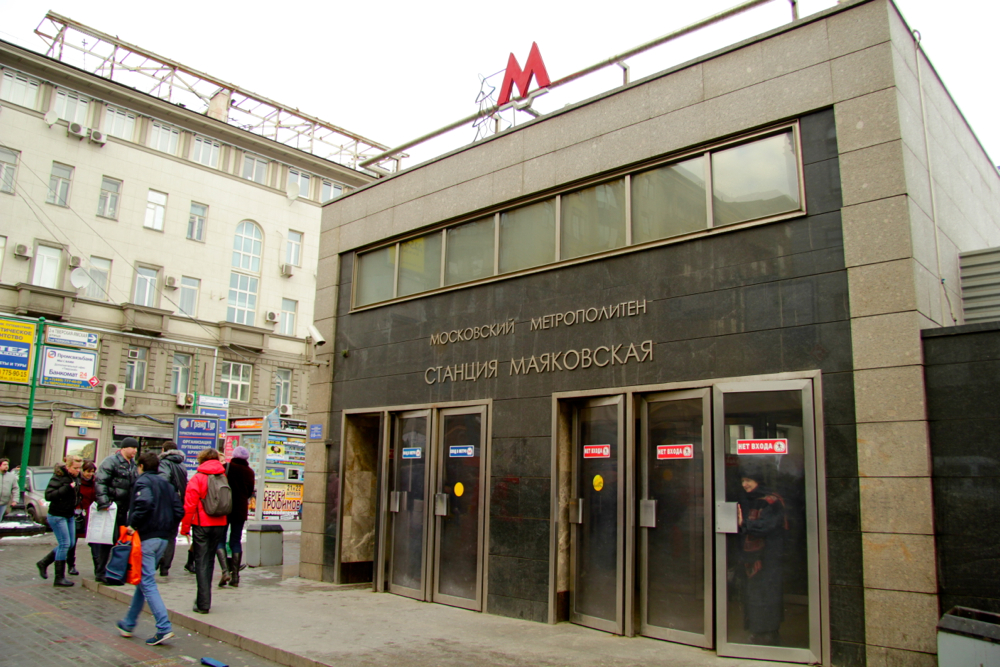
Mayakovskaya new (northern) vestibule

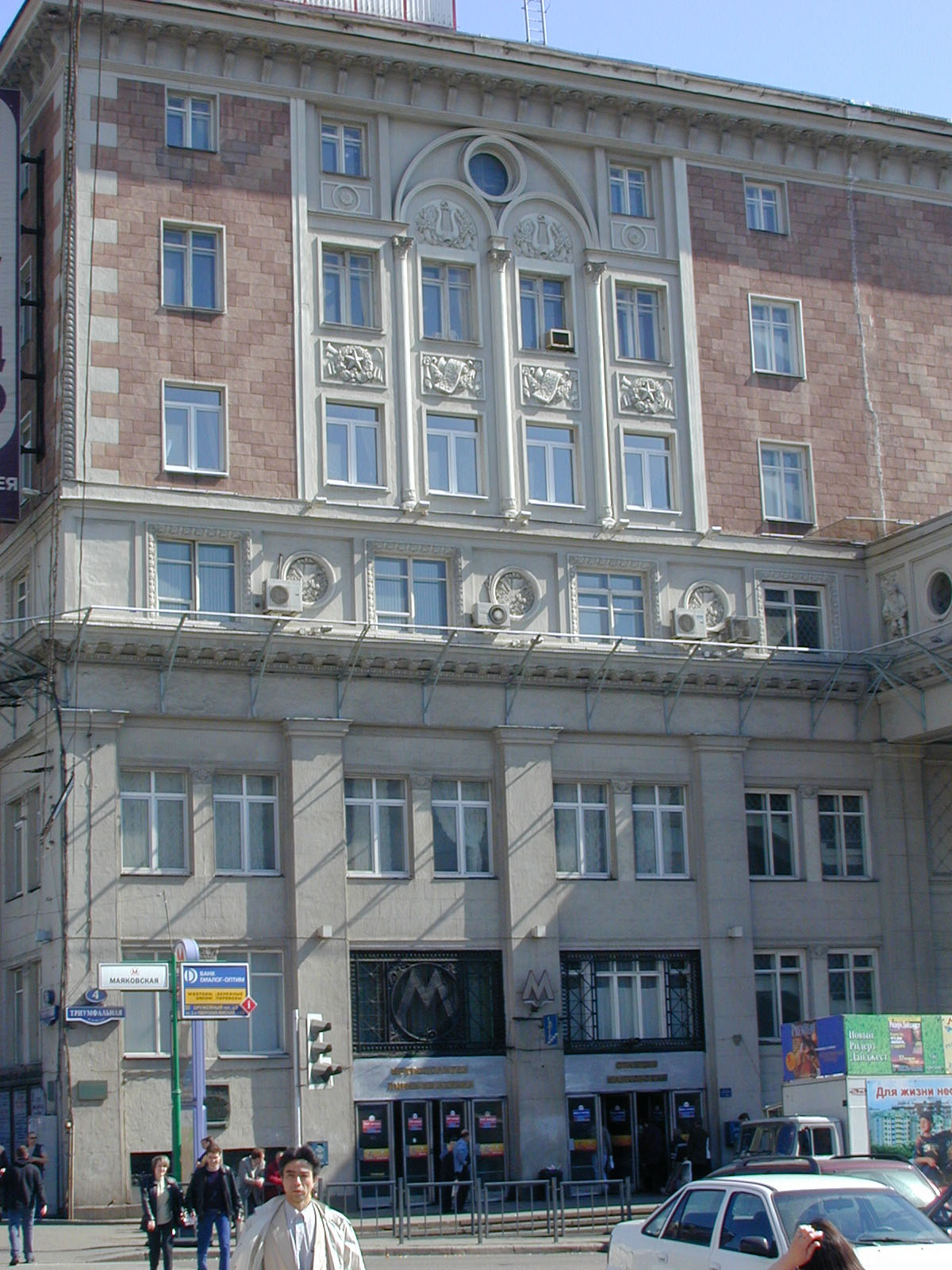
Mayakovskaya southern vestibule

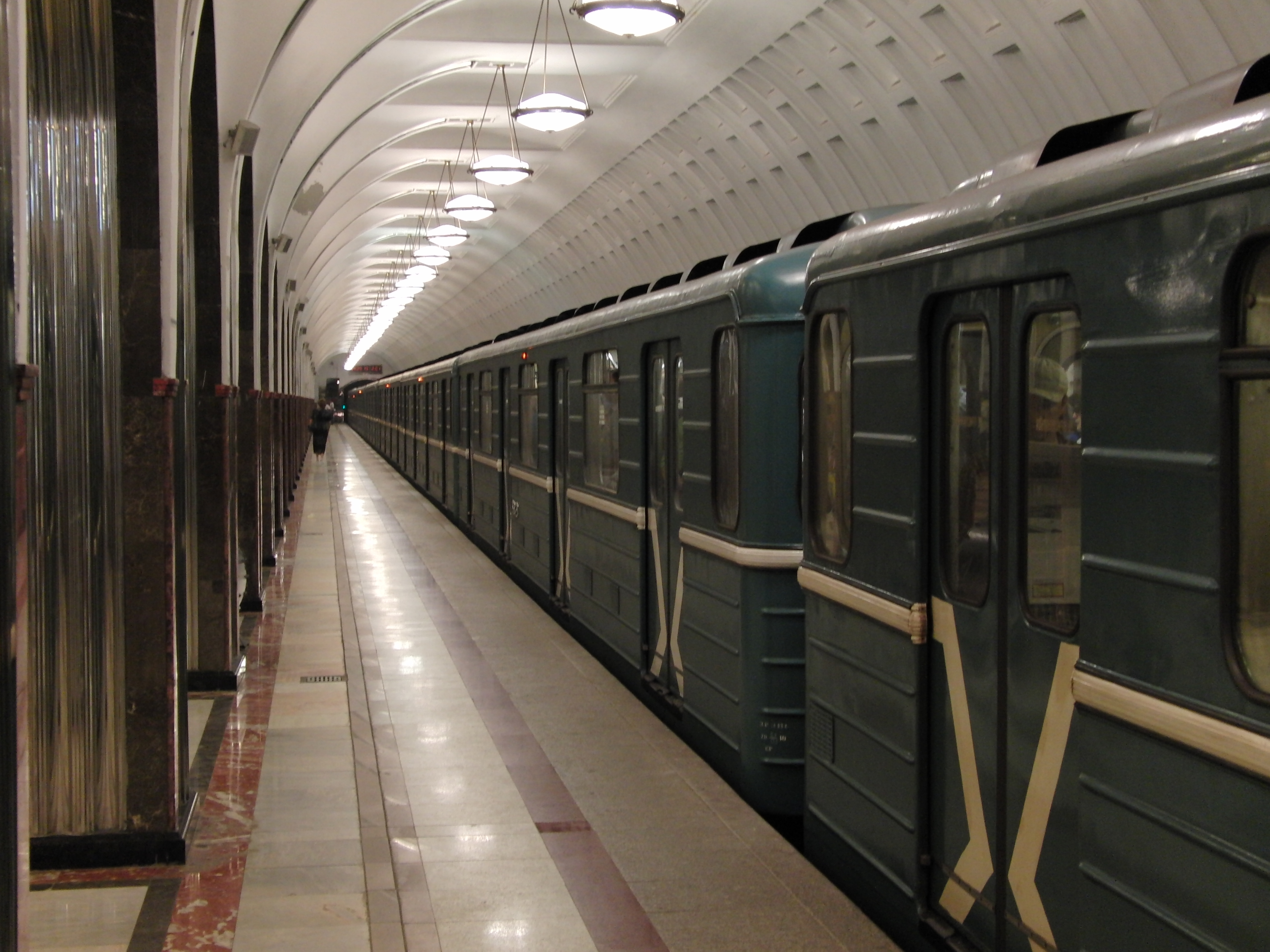
Station platform of Mayakovskaya station

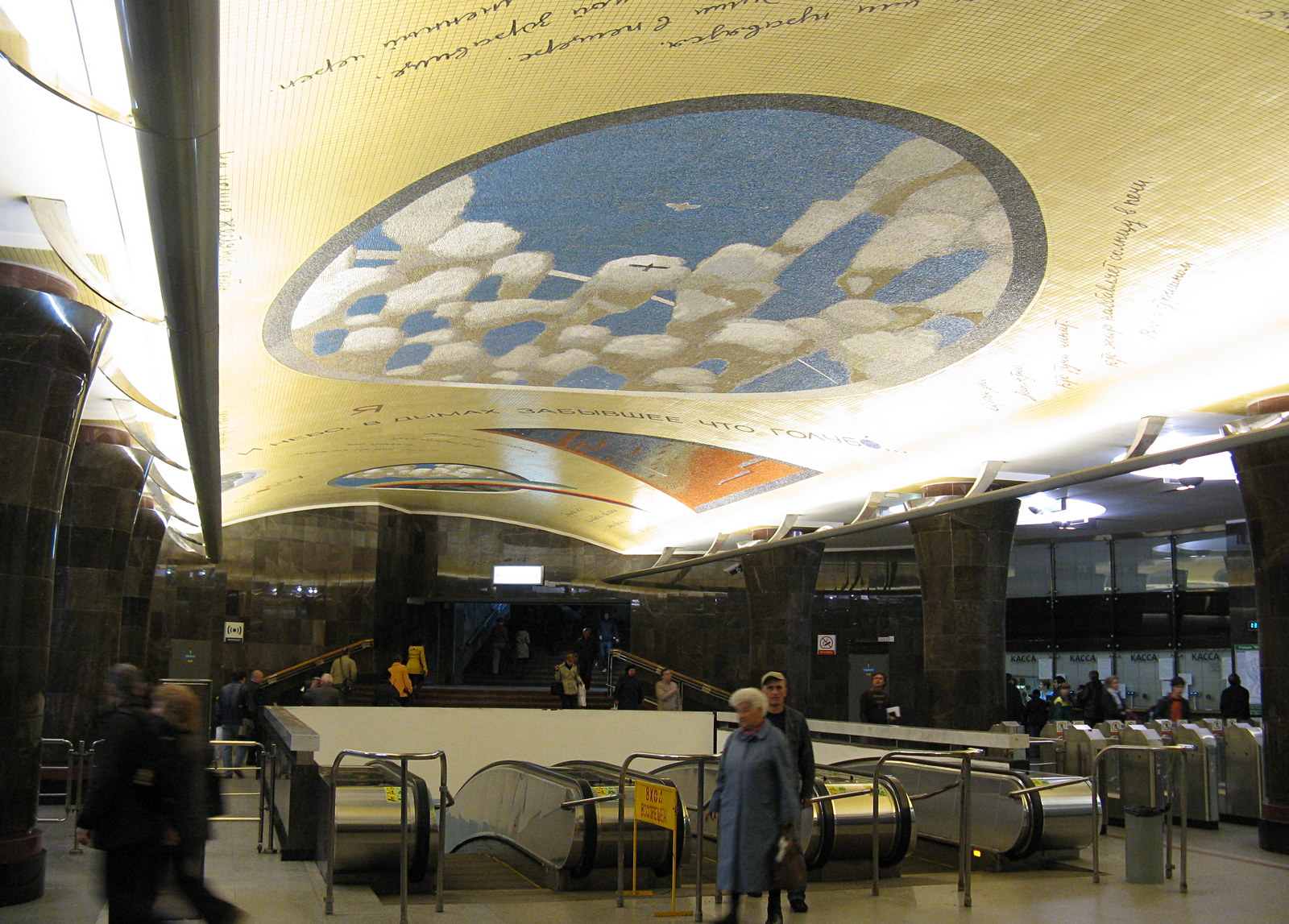
Northern exit hall. Columns, ceiling mosaic and texts were inspired by Futurist art

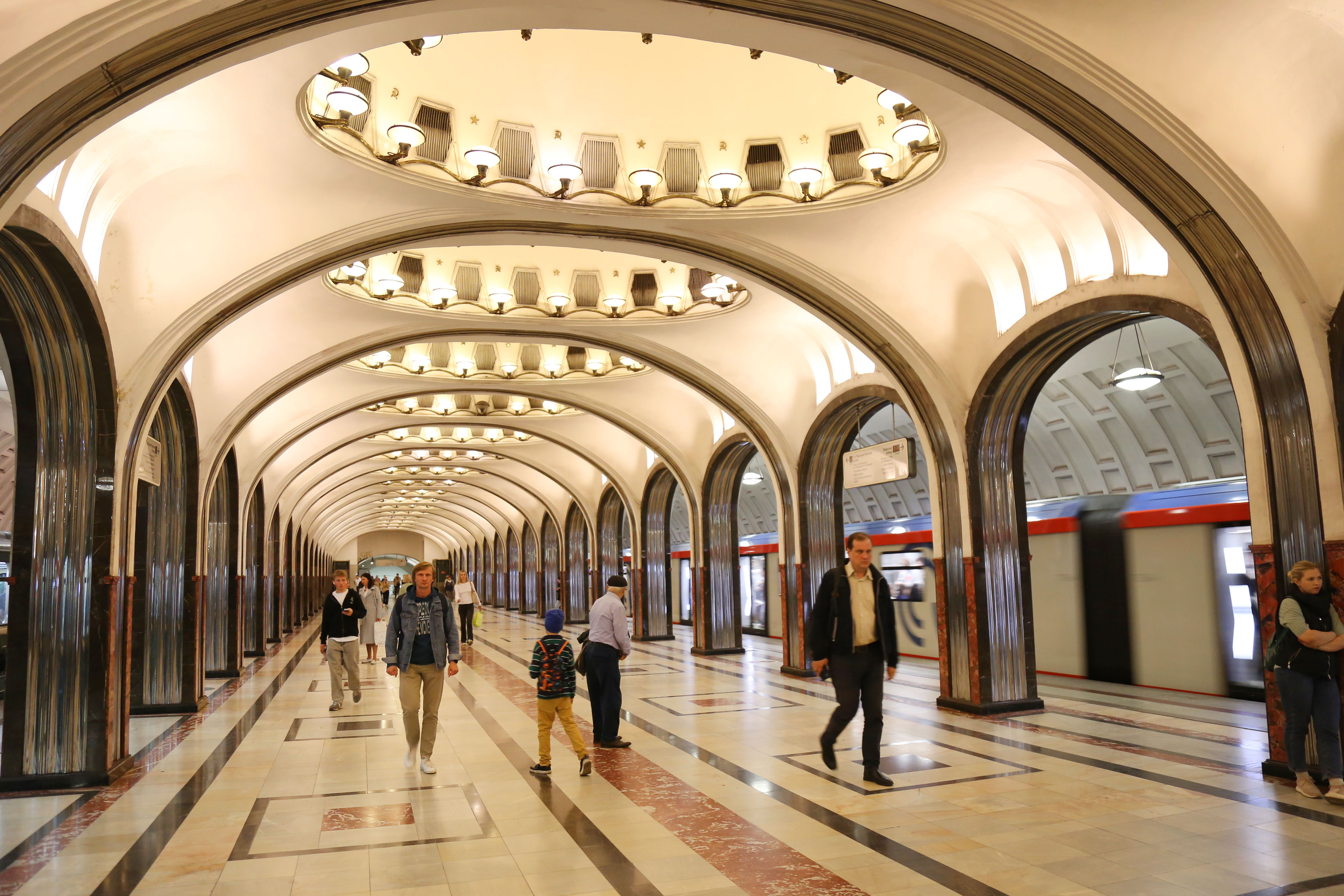
Mayakovskaya Metro Station, Moscow, Russia
