= Hotels in Moscow =

Like every other large city, Moscow has many hotels rated from 2 to 5 stars. Several large hotel chains are present in Moscow, including Sheraton, Marriott and Radisson.

In order to deal with high prices, numerous other options are available on the market, including hostels and short-term apartment rental.

== Gallery ==
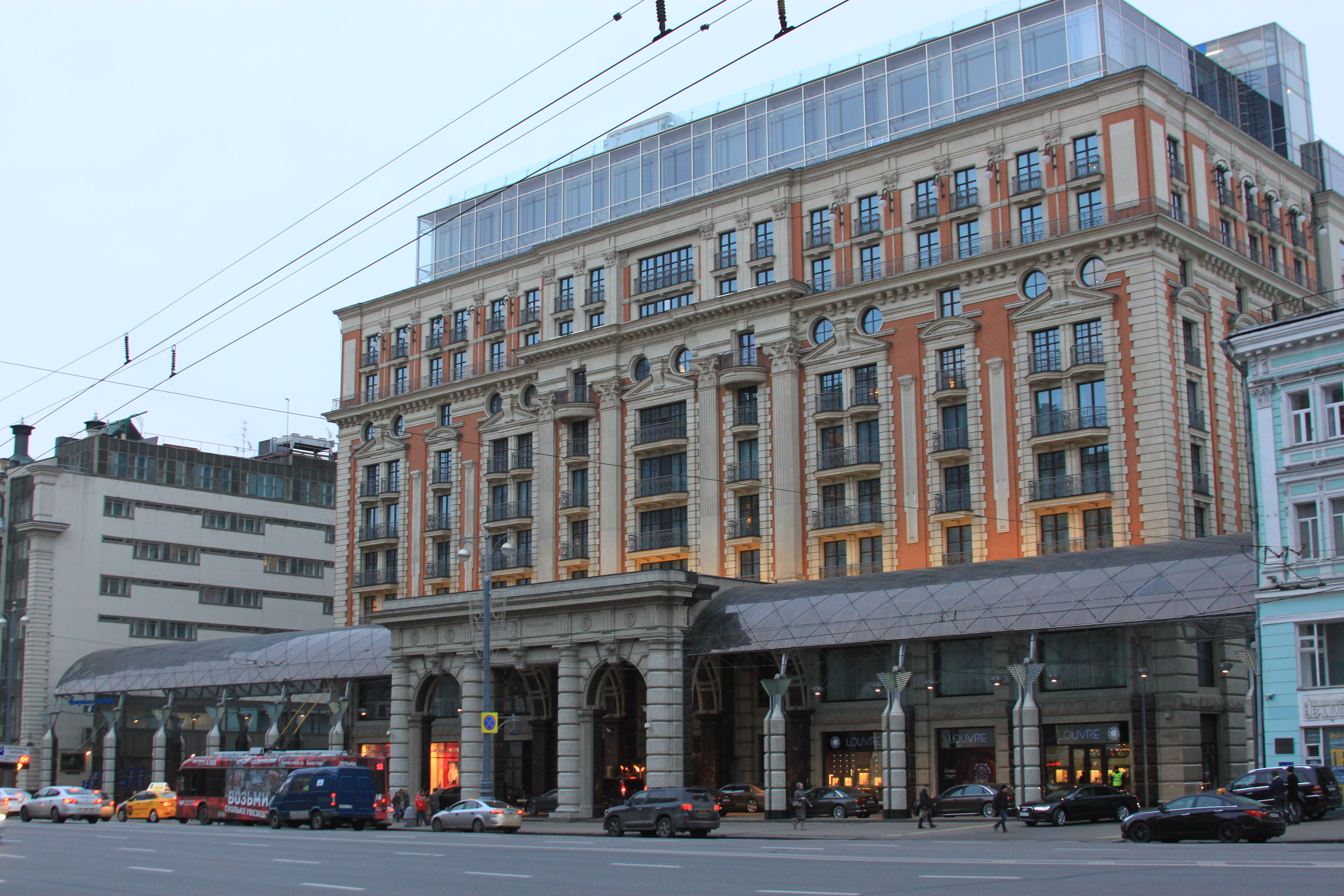
The Carlton Moscow

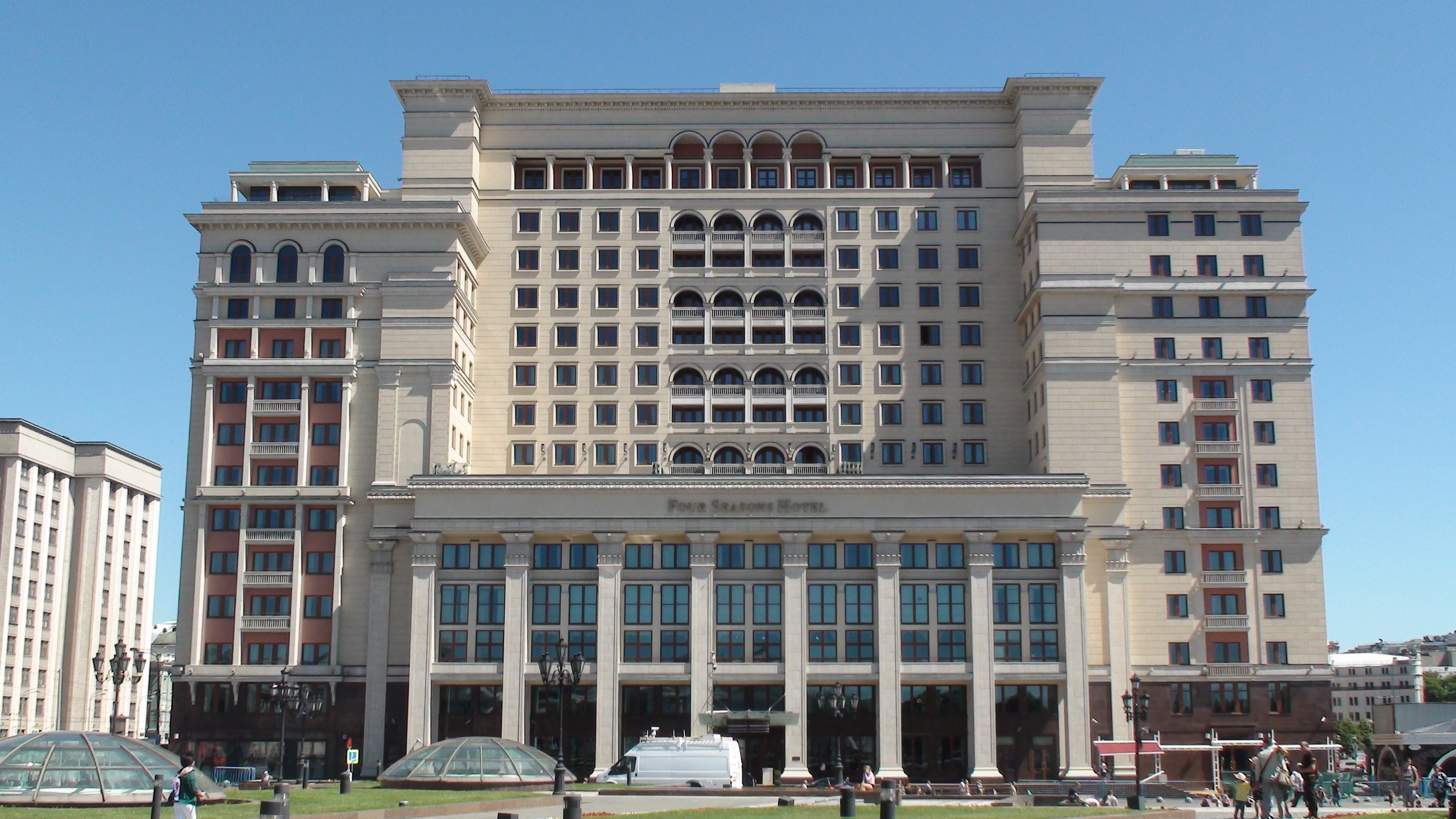
Four Seasons Hotel Moscow

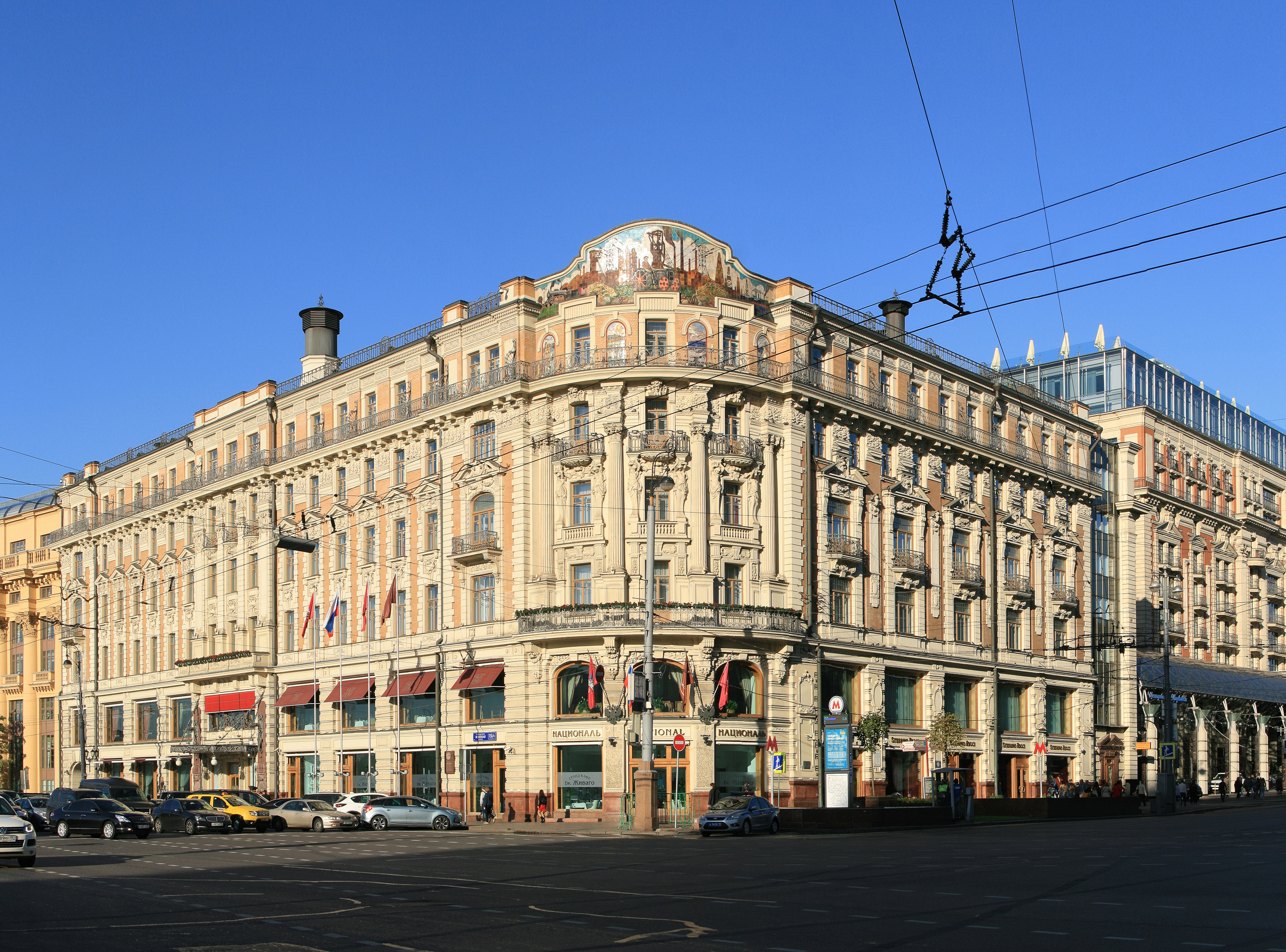
Hotel National

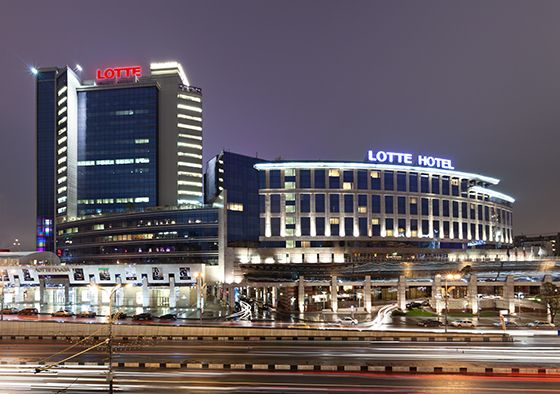
Lotte Hotel Moscow

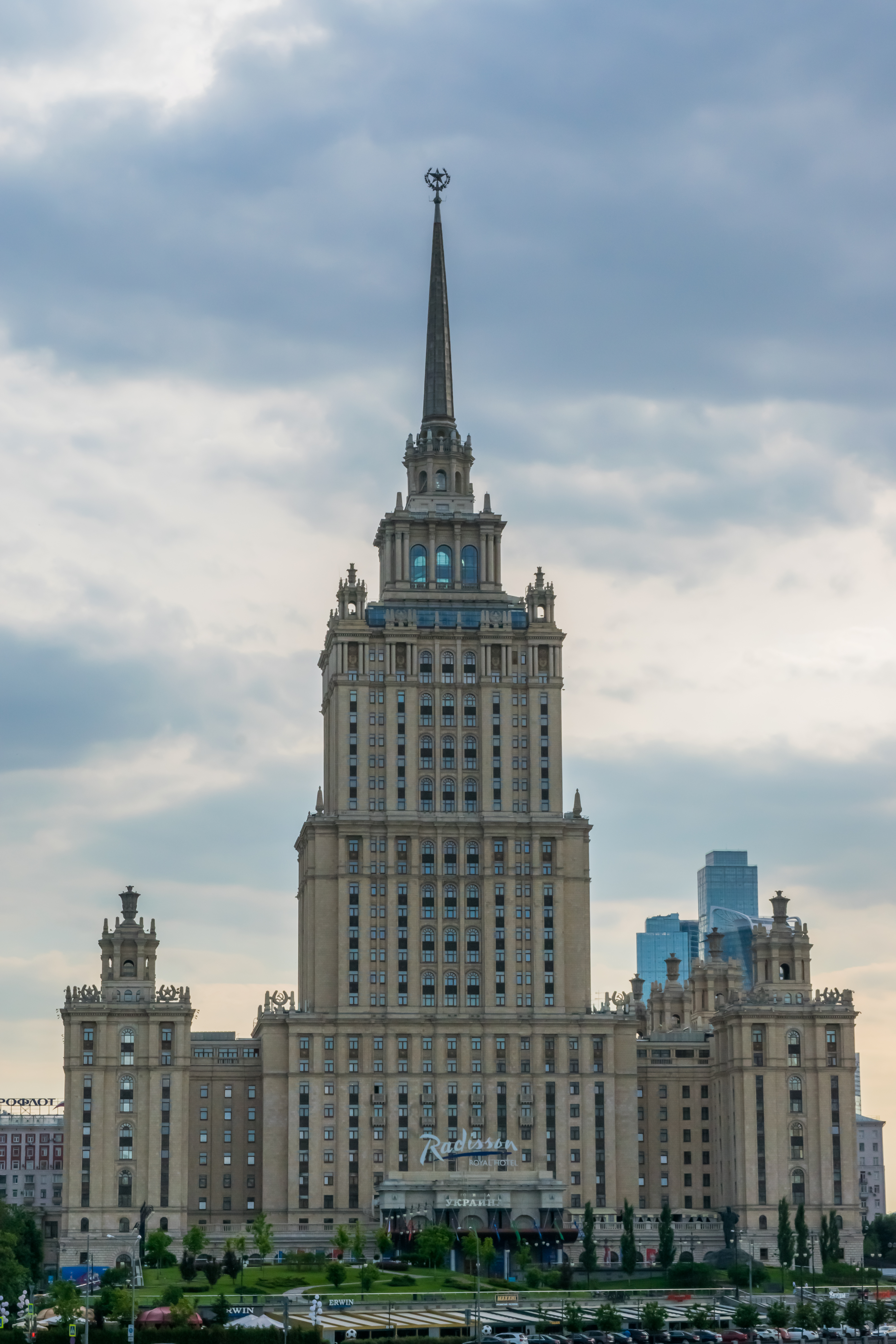
Hotel Ukraina, Moscow

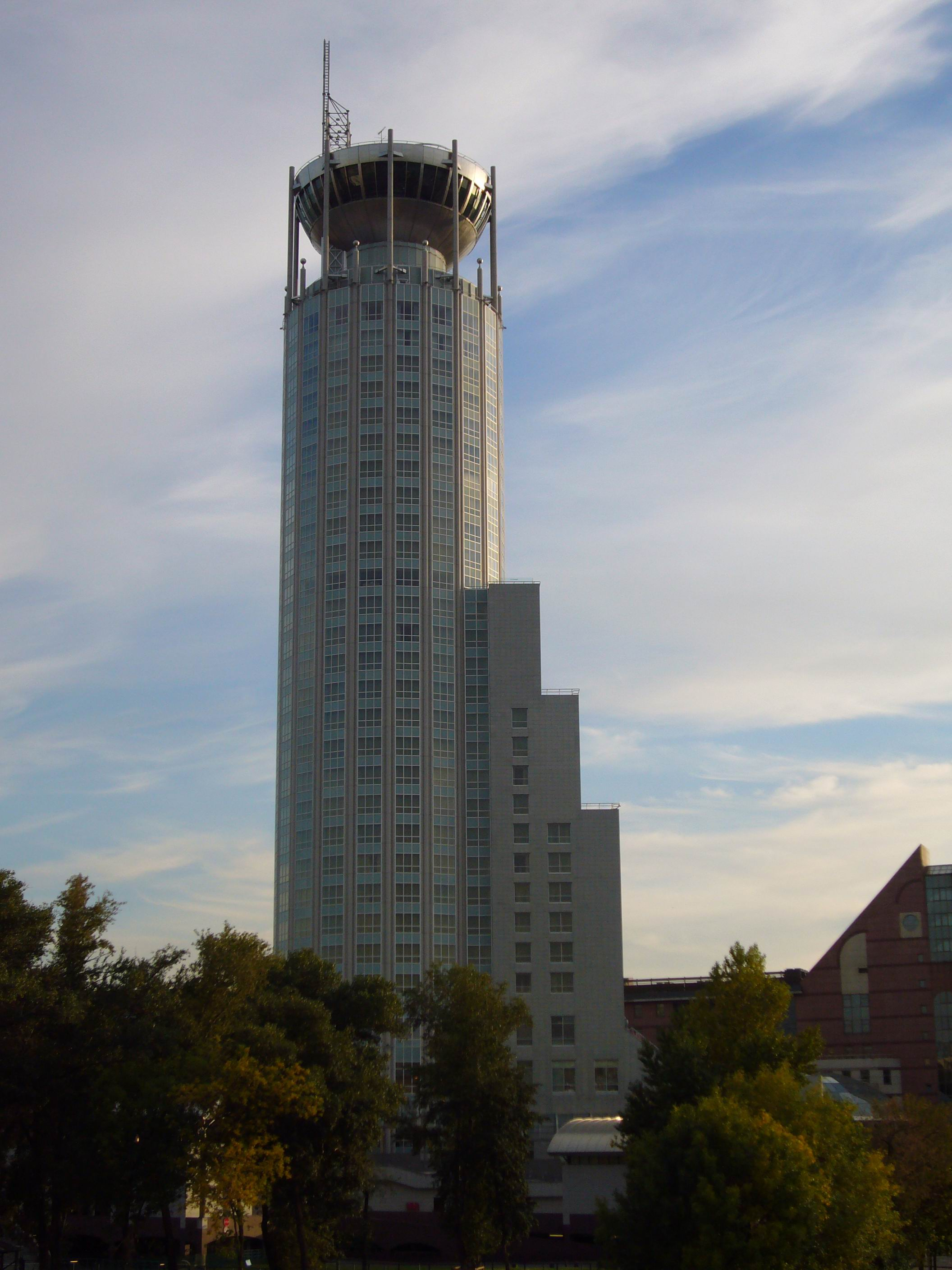
Swissôtel Krasnye Holmy Moscow

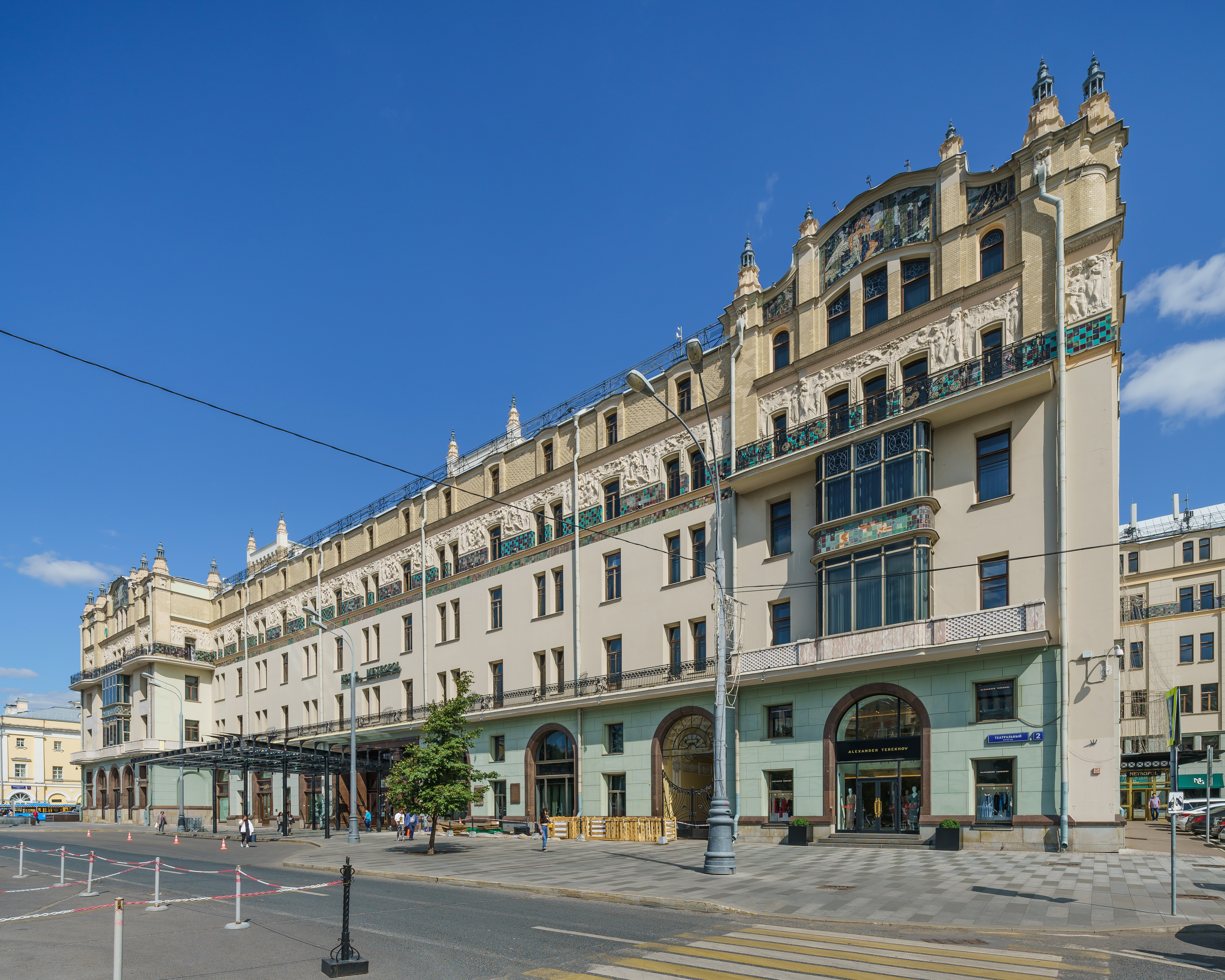
Hotel Metropol Moscow

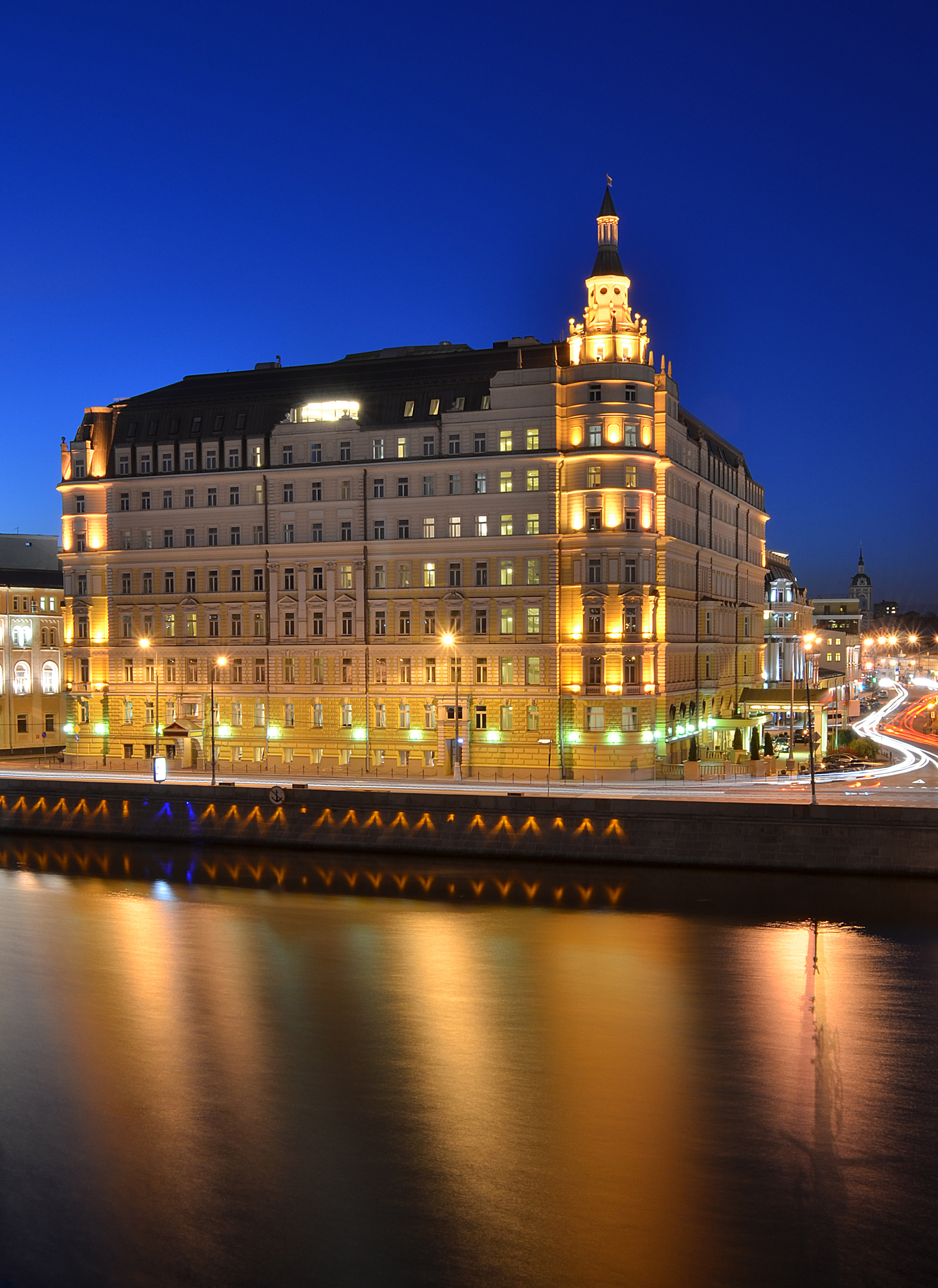
Hotel Baltschug Kempinski

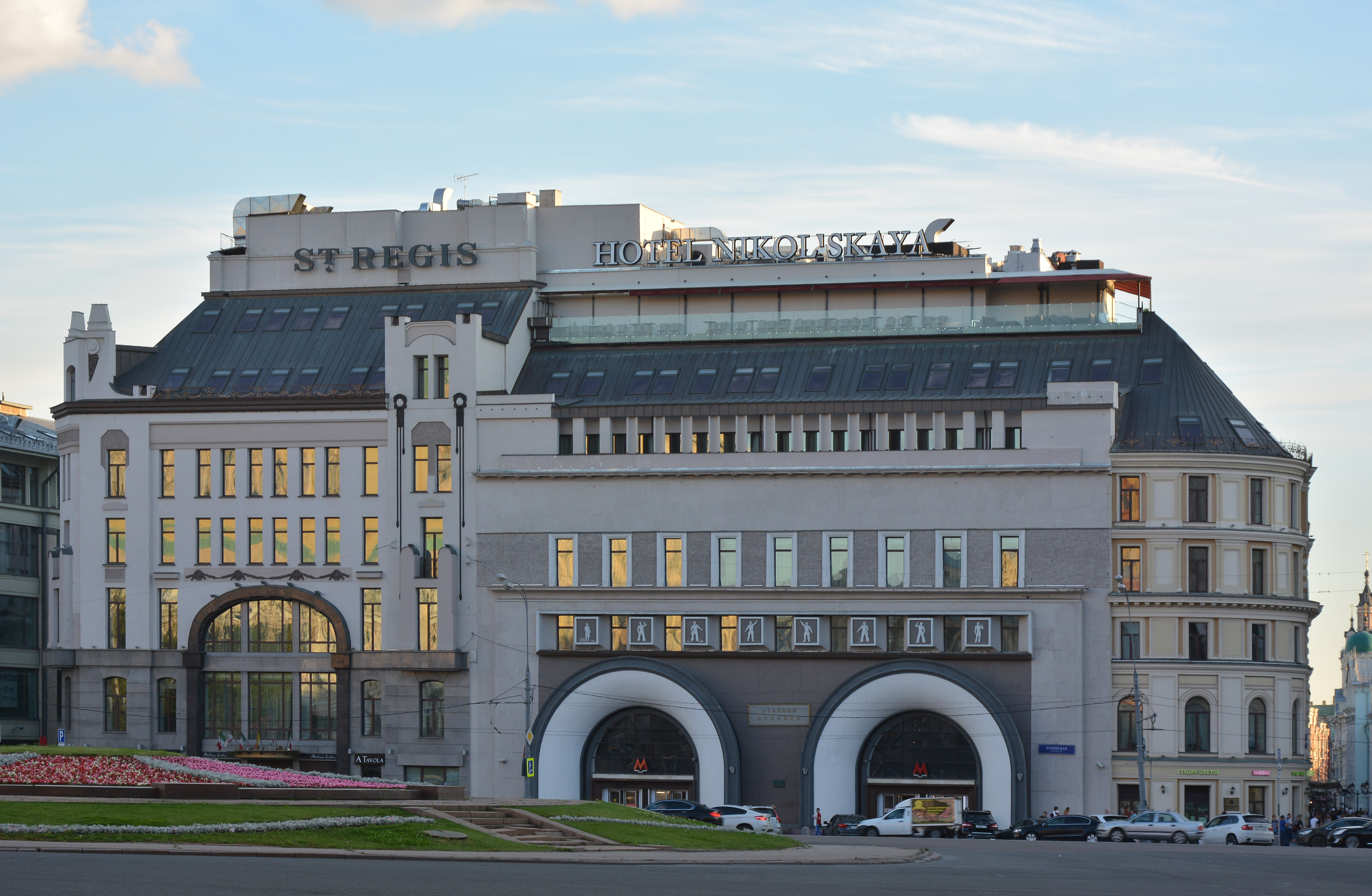
St. Regis Moscow Nikolskaya Hotel

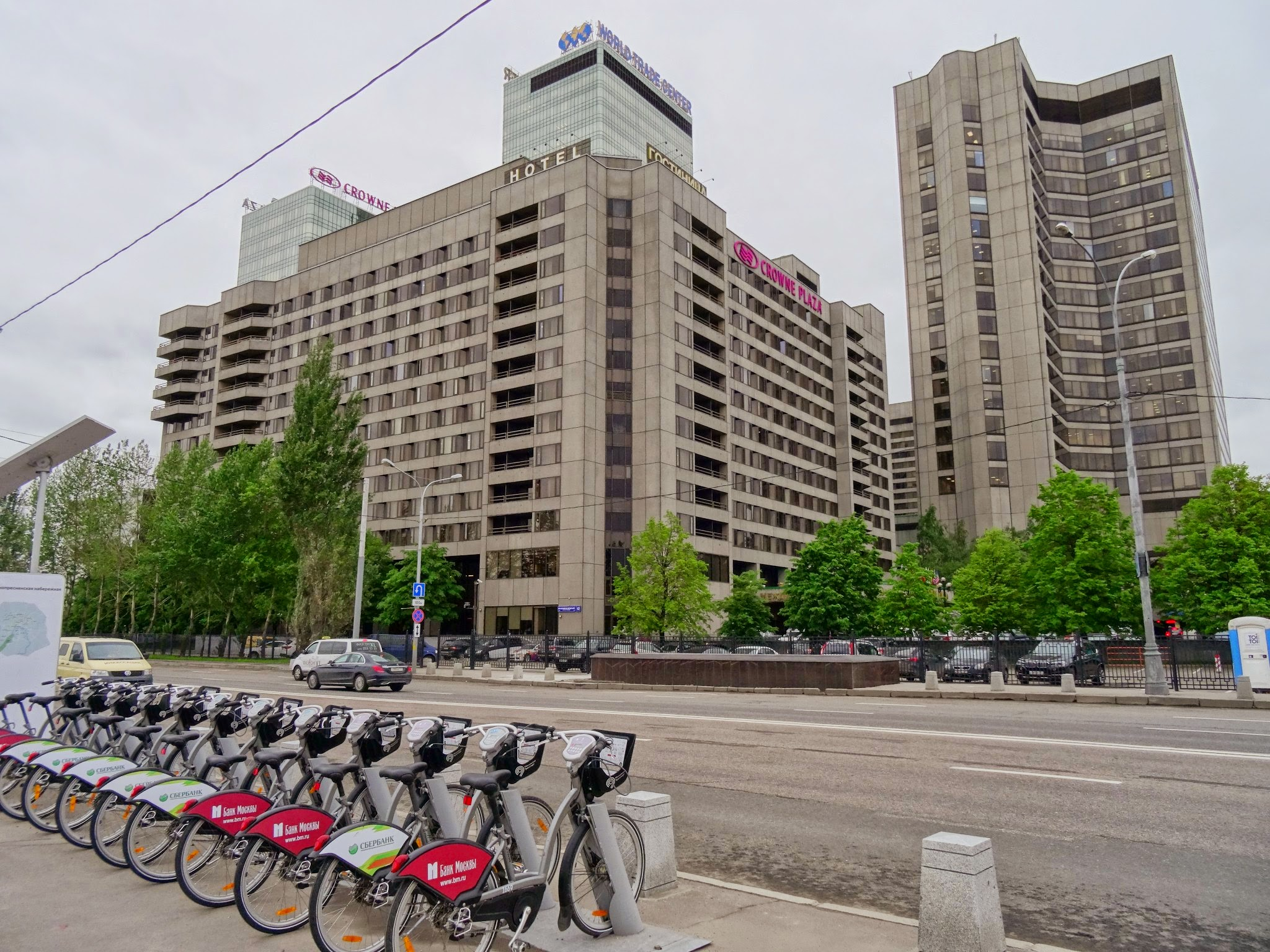
Crowne Plaza Moscow World Trade Centre Hotel

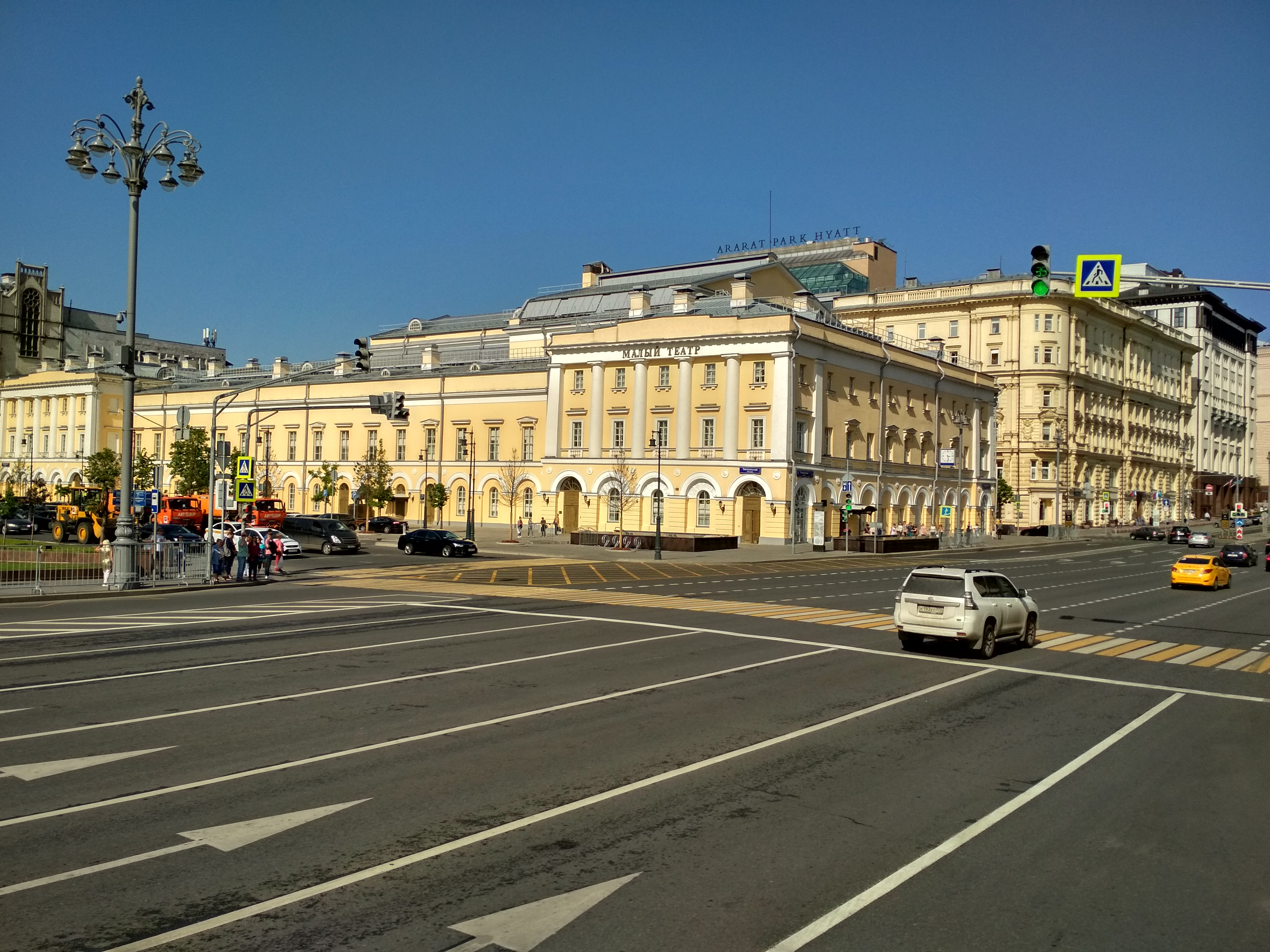
Ararat Park Hotel Moscow

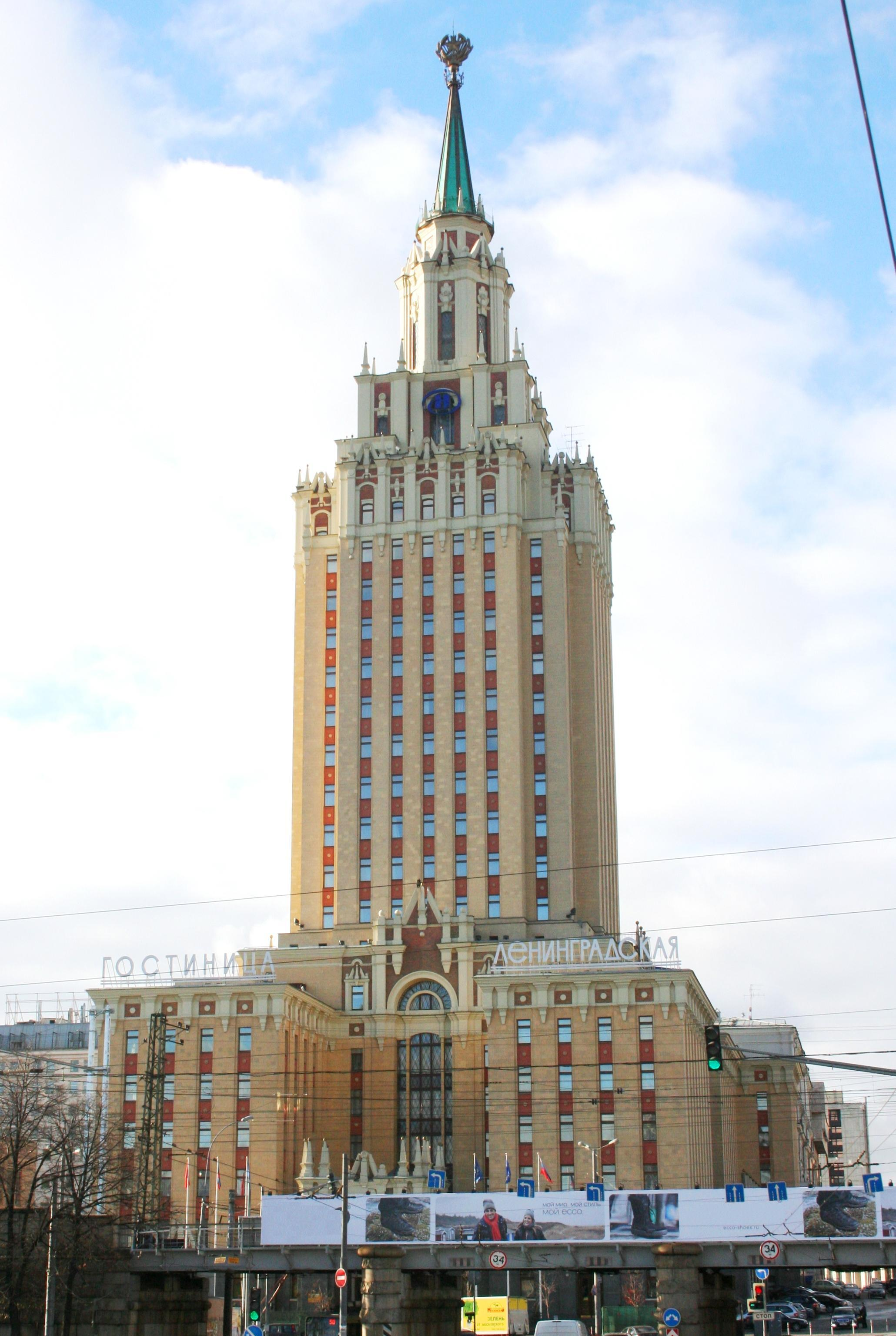
Hilton Moscow Leningradskaya

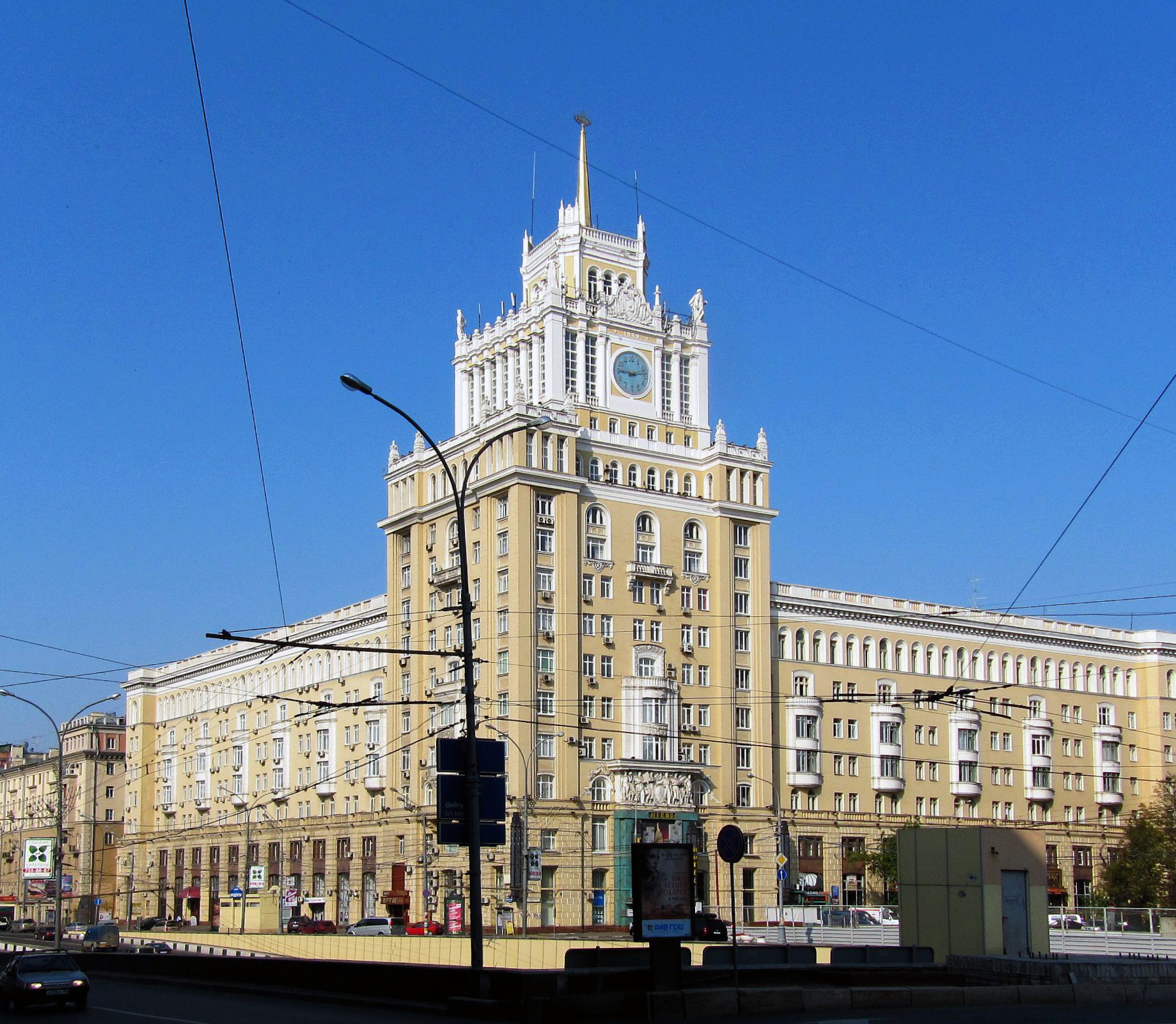
Peking Hotel

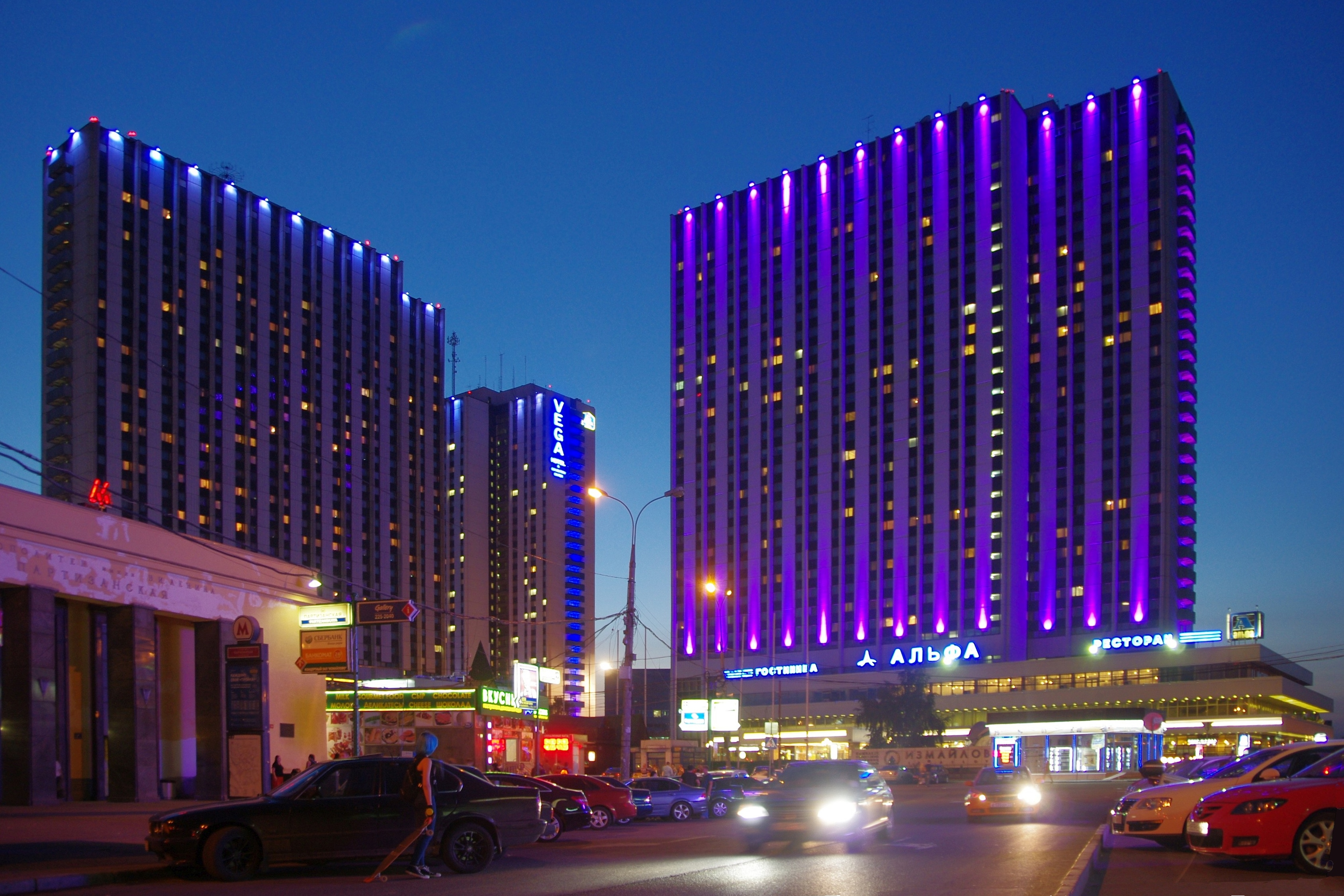
Izmailovo Hotel

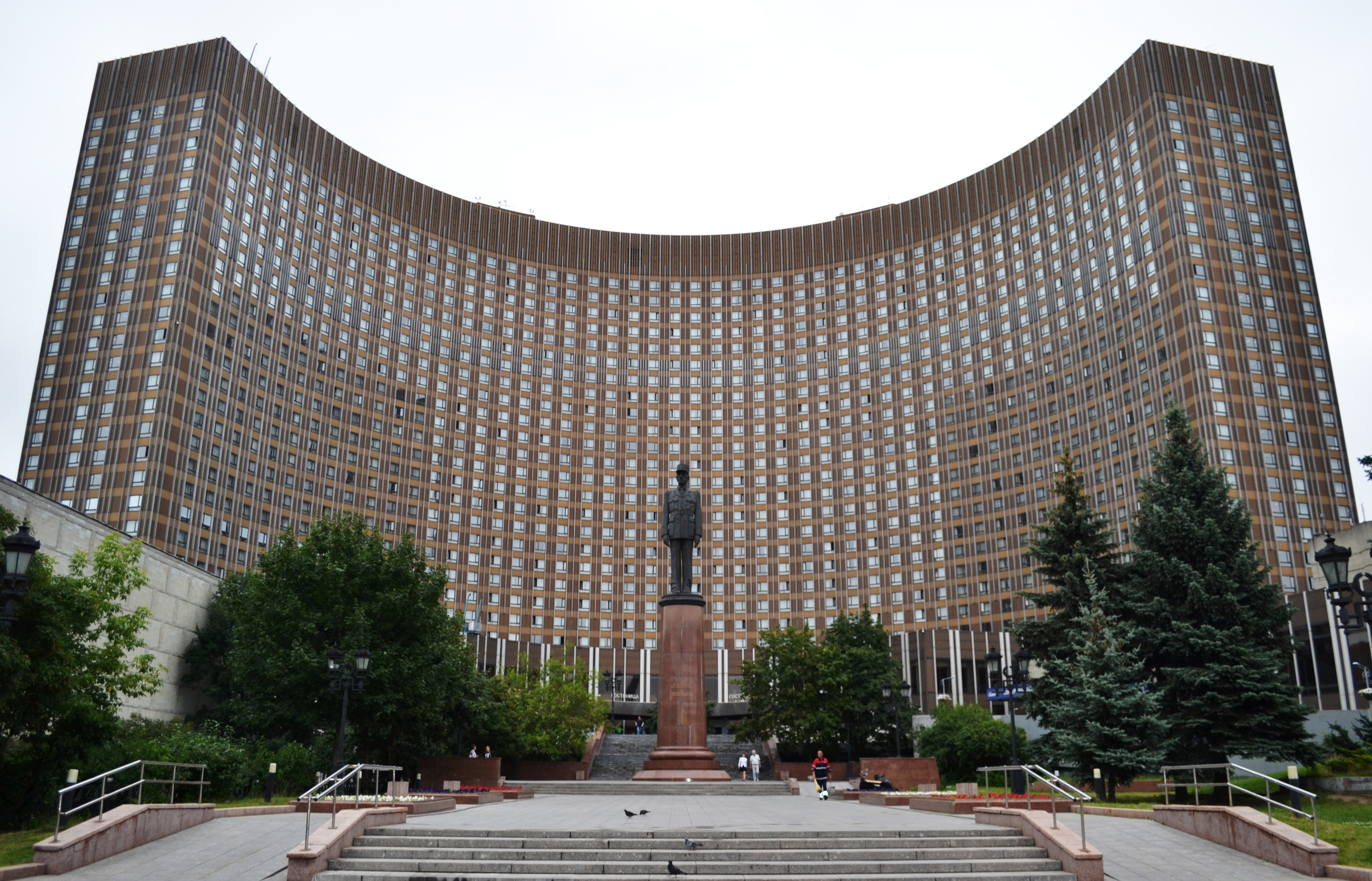
Cosmos Hotel

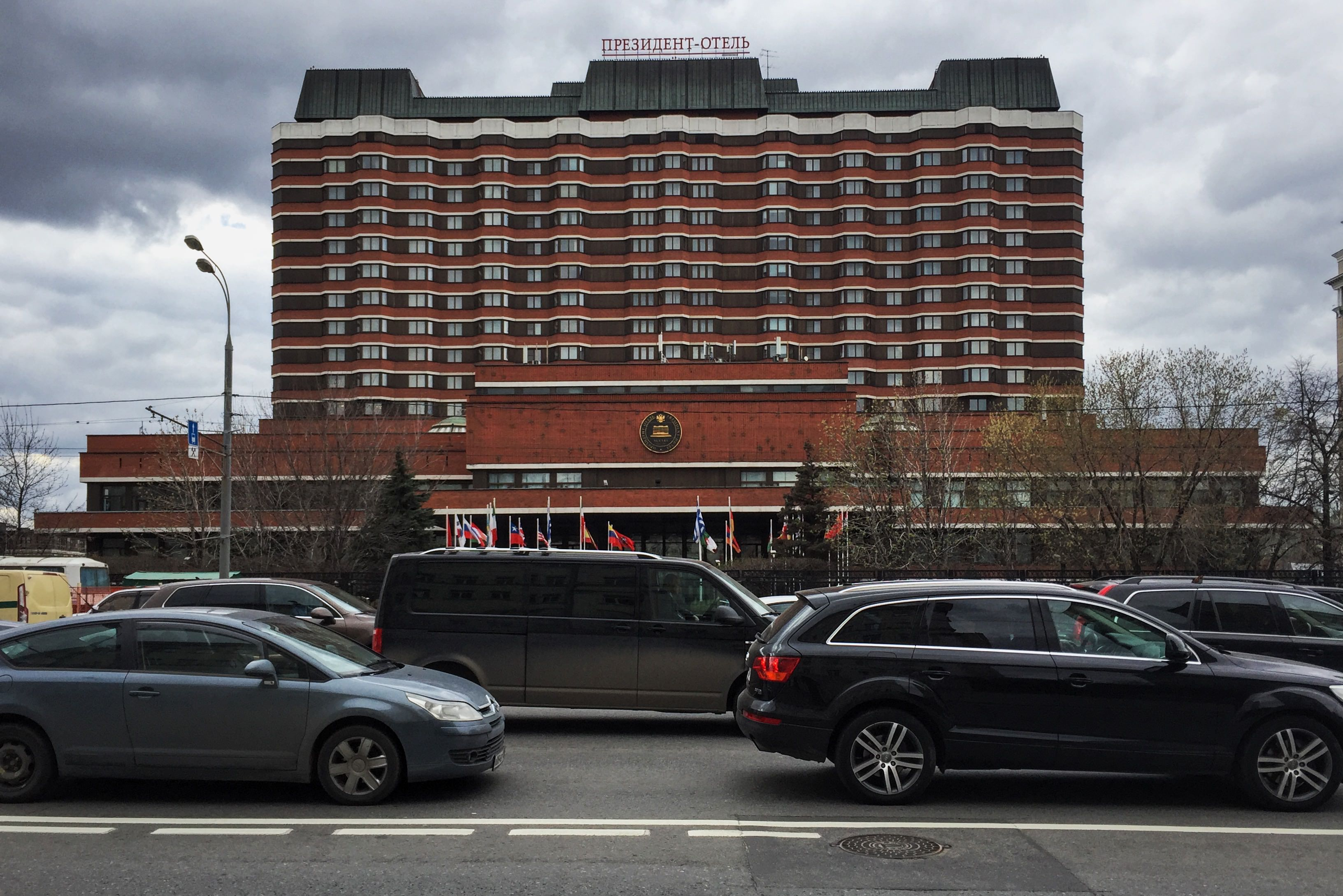
President Hotel

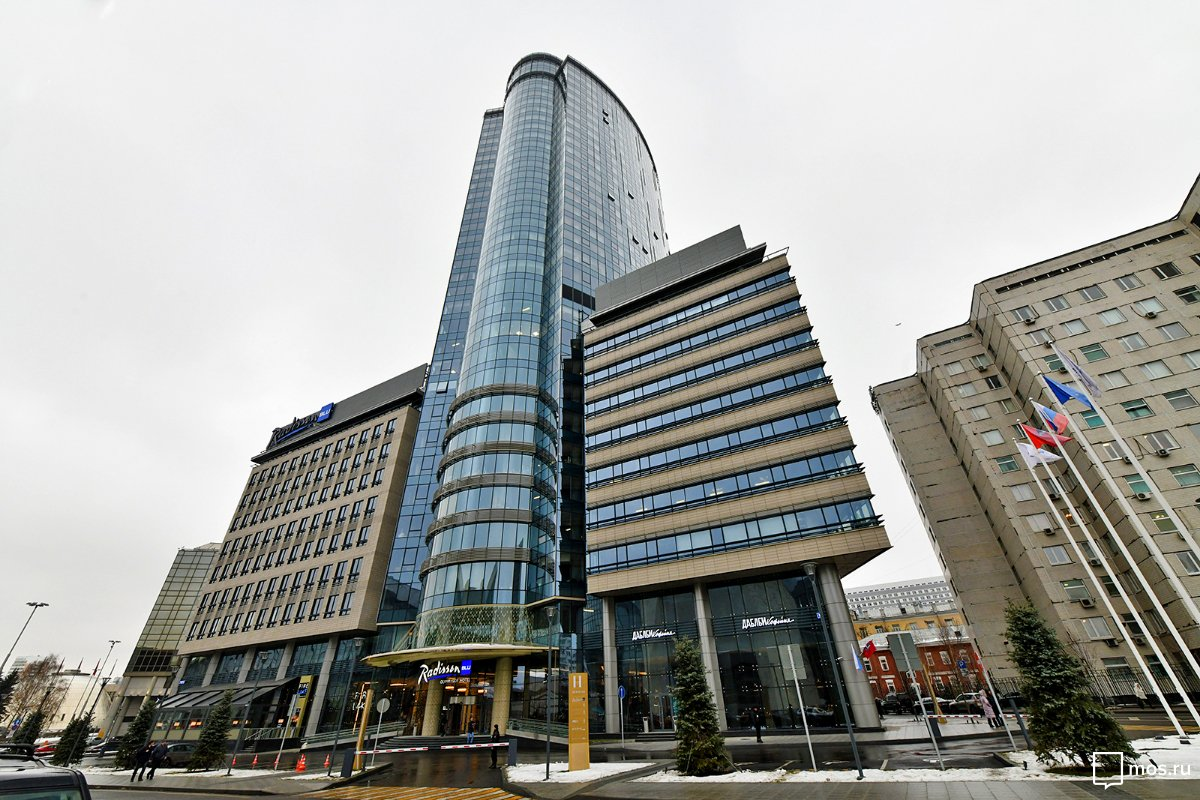
Radisson Blu Olympiyskiy Hotel

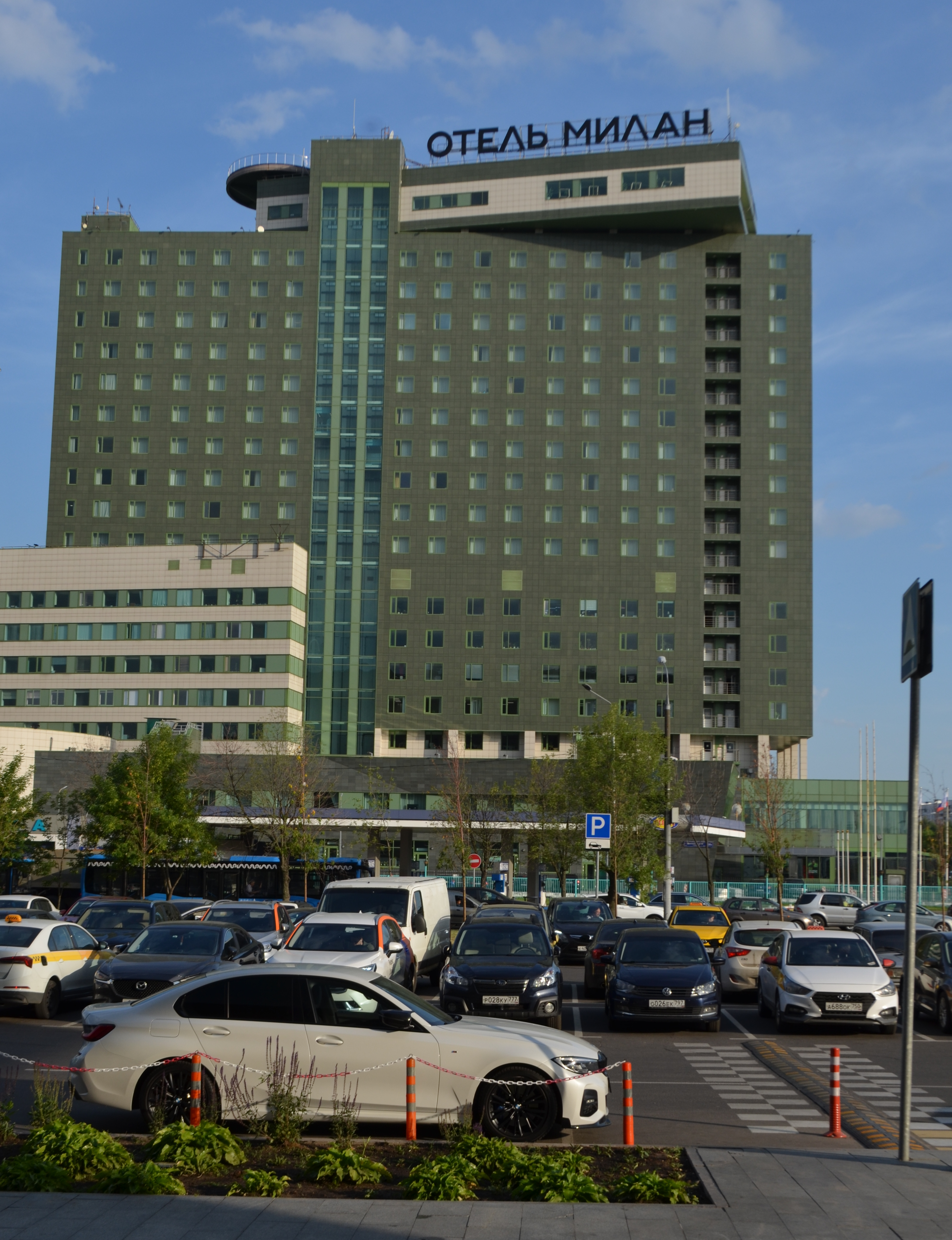
Milan Hotel

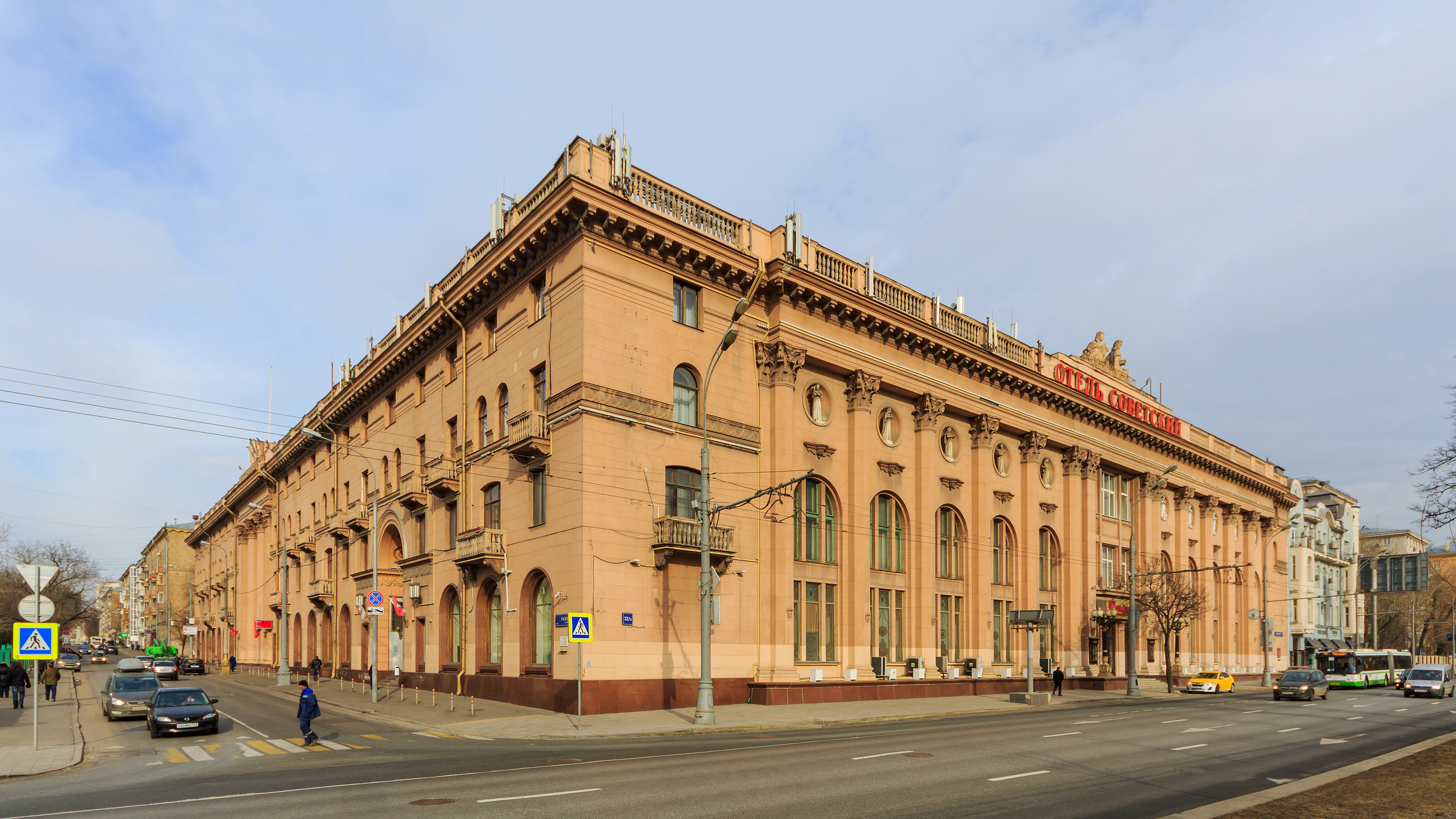
Sovietsky Hotel

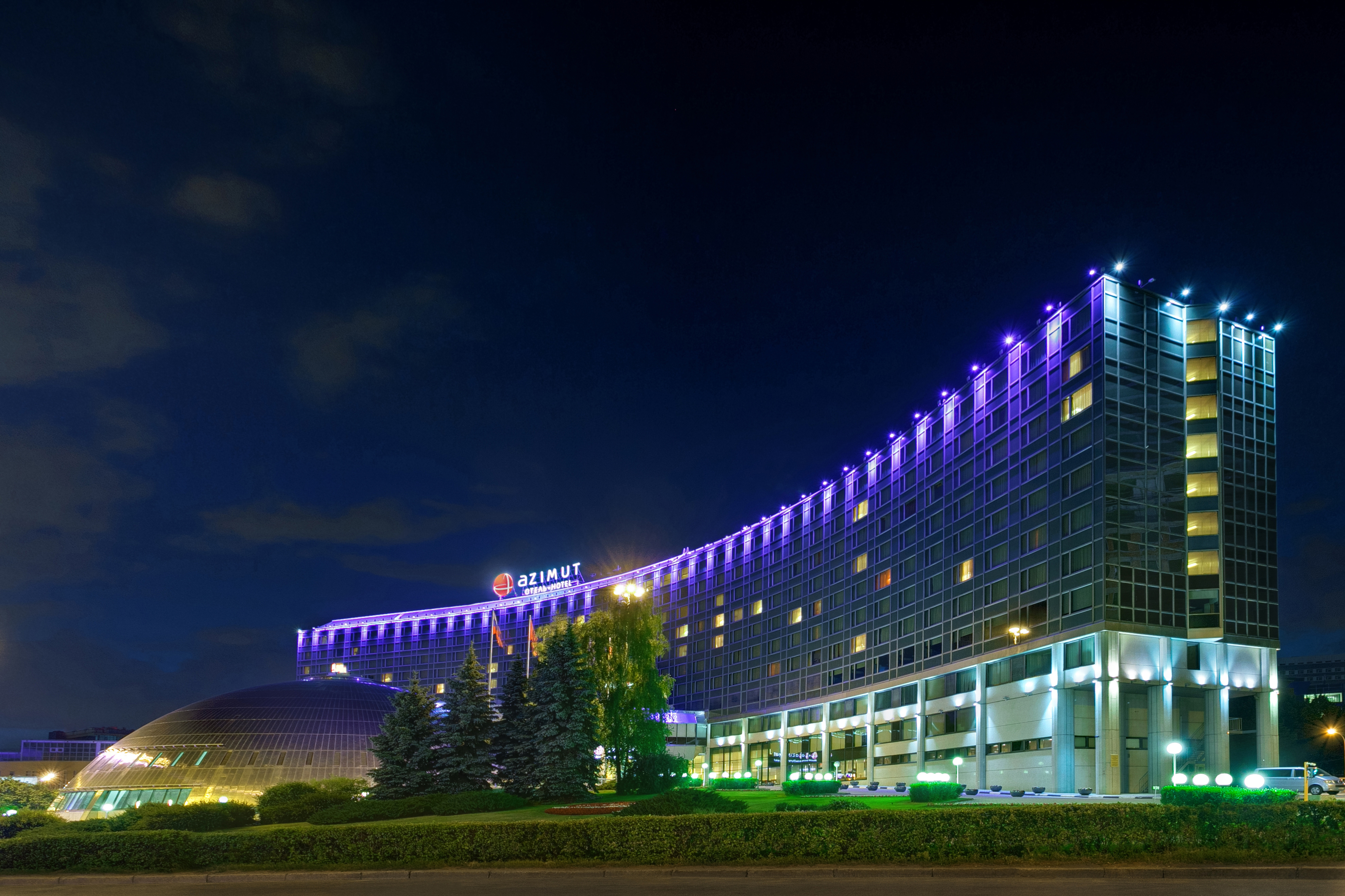
Azimut Moscow Olympic Hotel

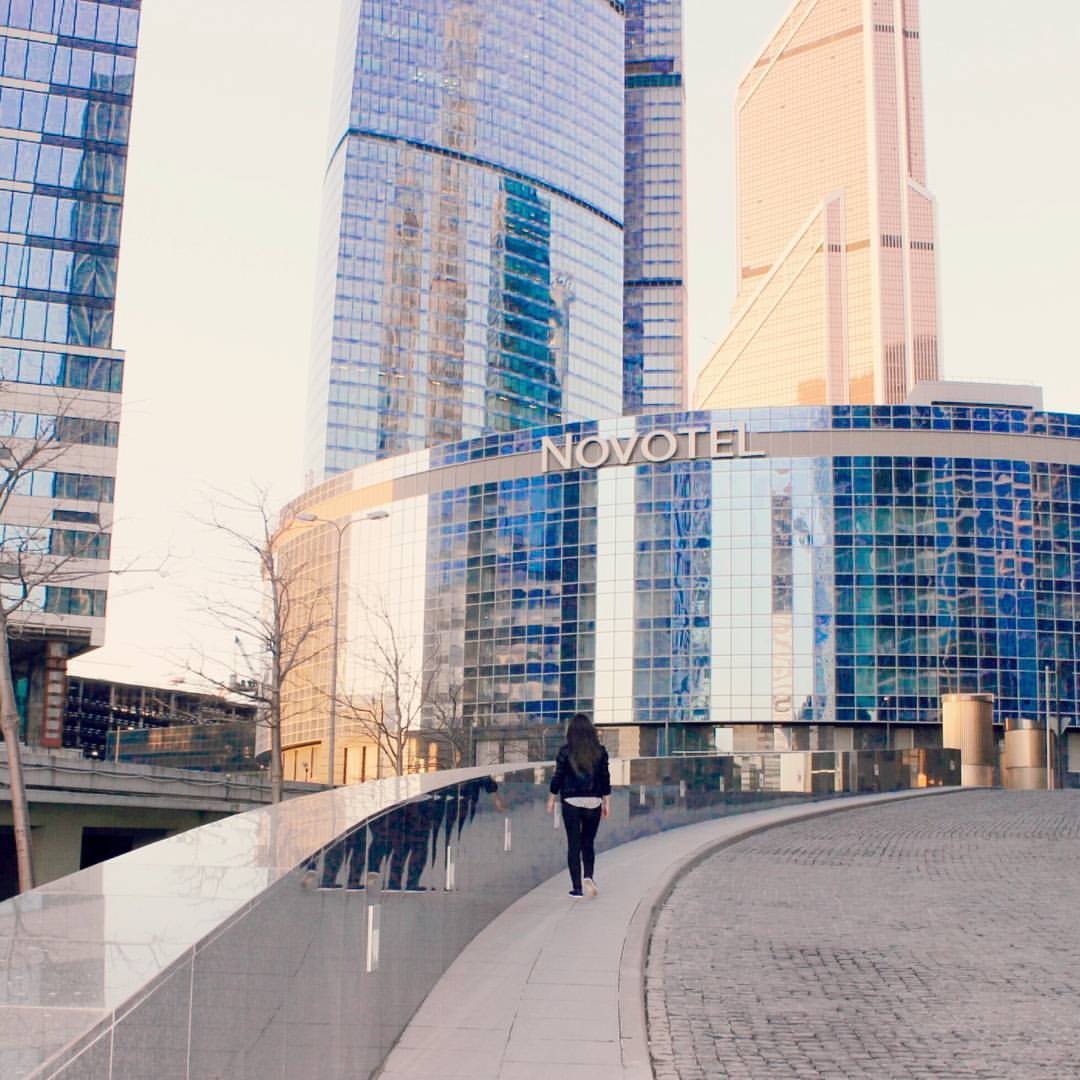
Hotel Novotel Moscow City

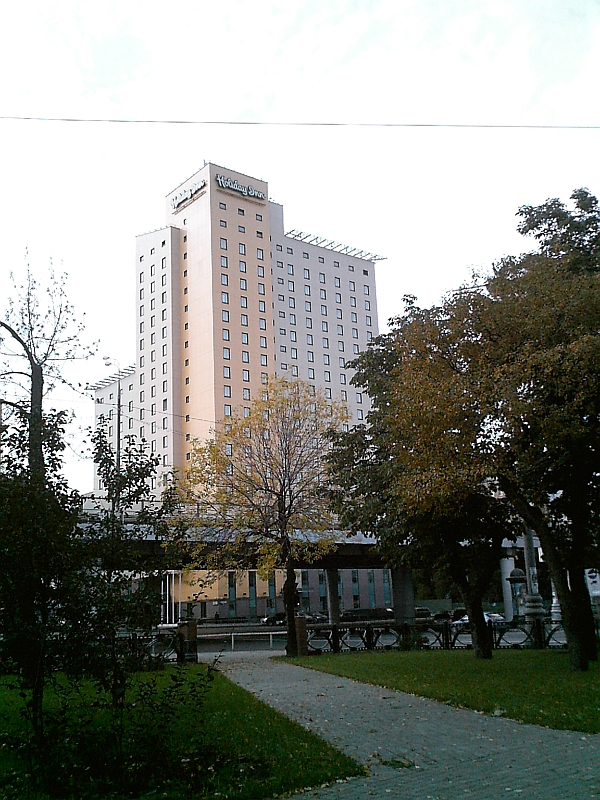
Holiday Inn Moscow Suschevsky

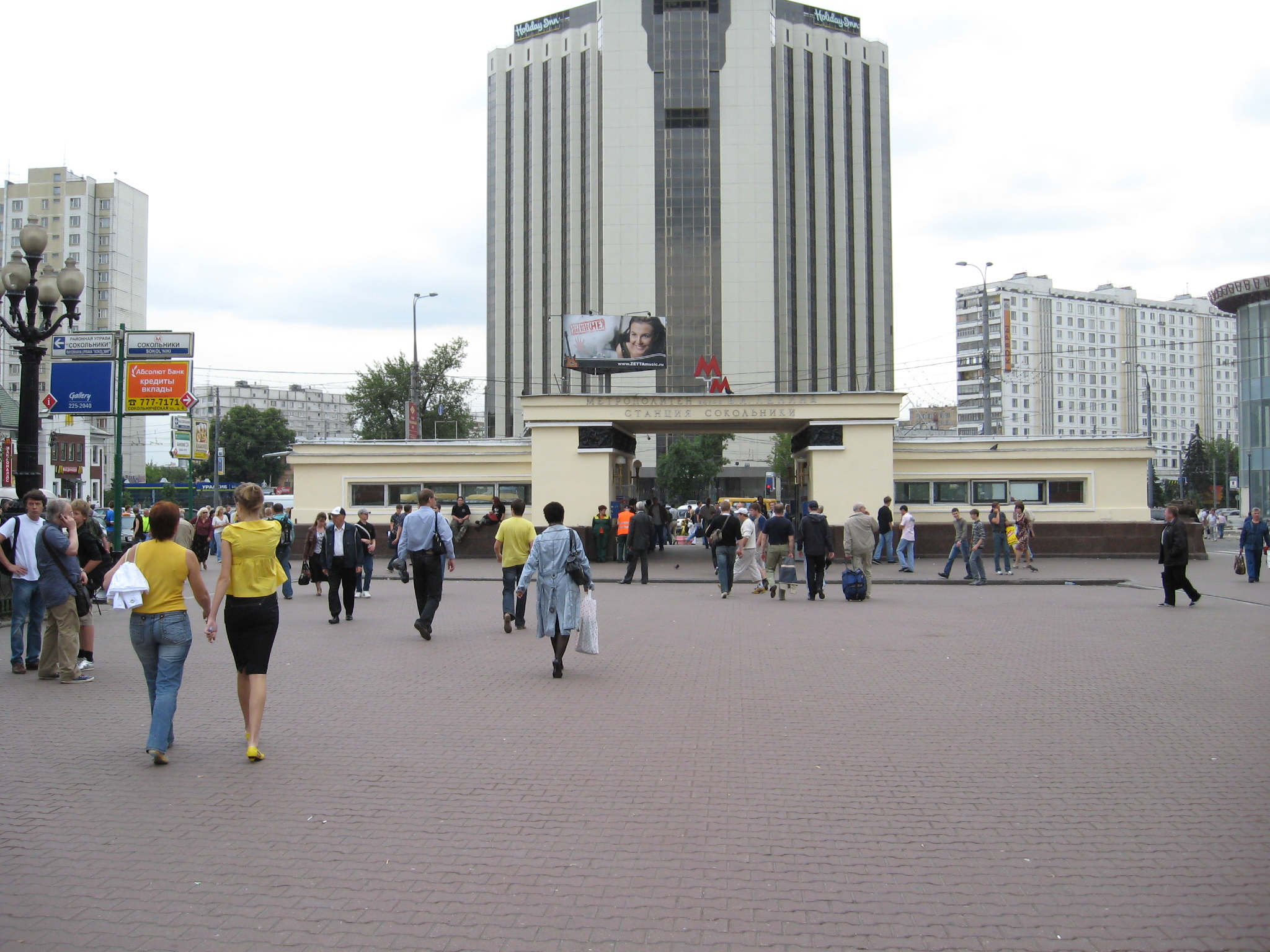
Holiday Inn Moscow Sokolniki

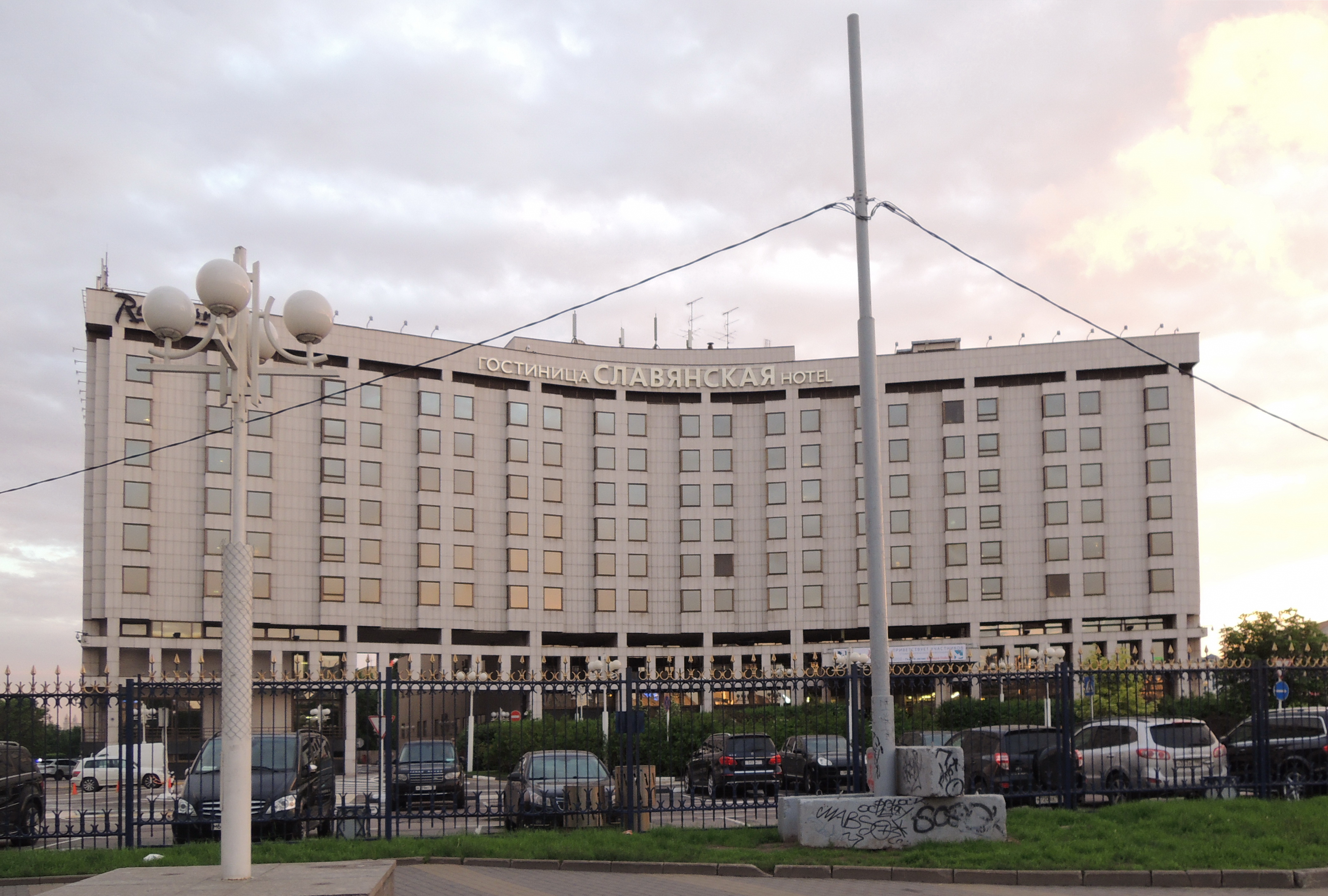
Radisson Slavyanskaya Hotel

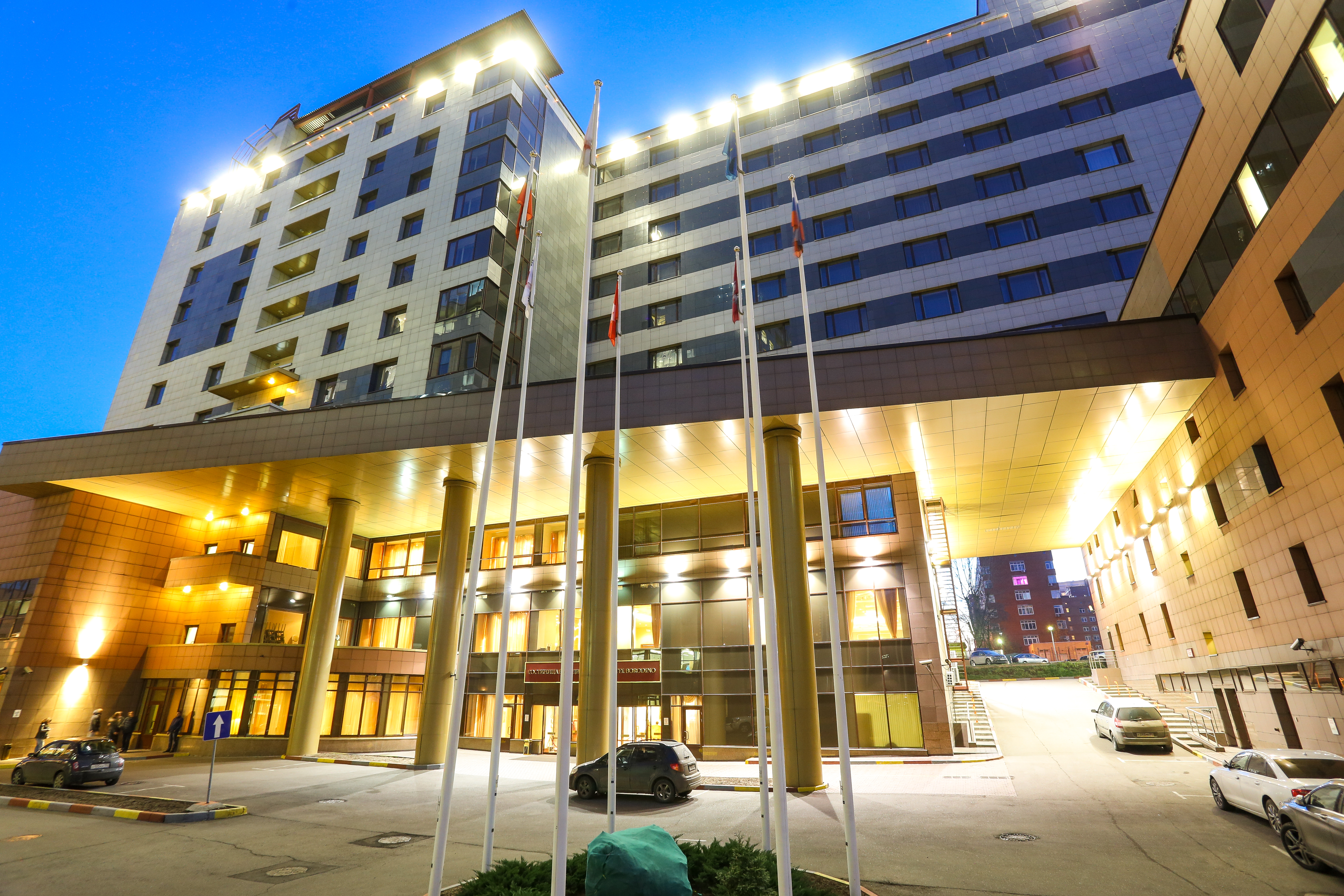
Borodino Hotel

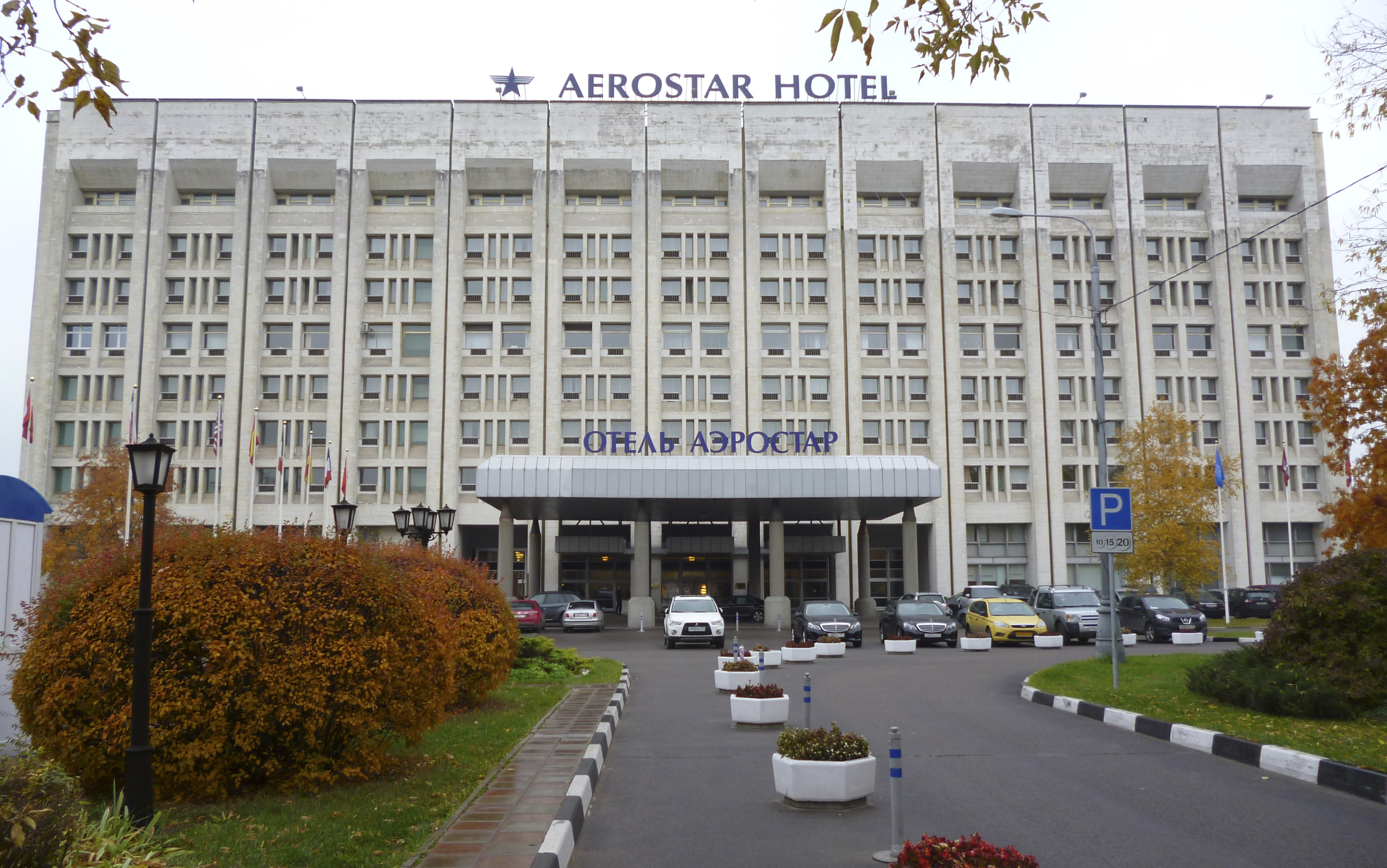
Aerostar Hotel

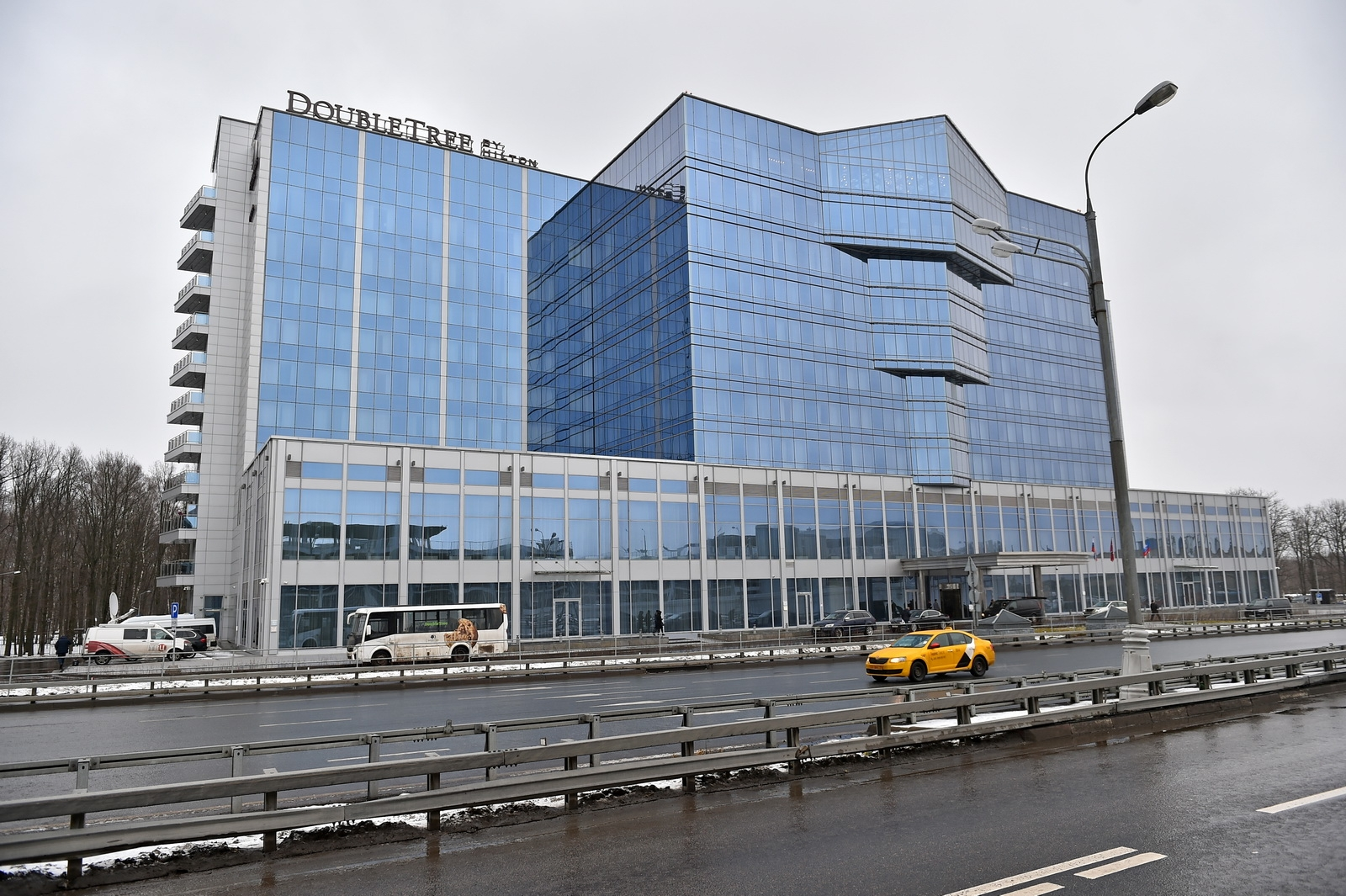
DoubleTree by Hilton Moscow - Vnukovo Airport

== List of 5-star hotels in Moscow ==
- Four Seasons Hotel Moscow
- Golden Ring Hotel
- Hilton Moscow Leningradskaya Hotel
- Hotel Metropol
- Lotte Hotel Moscow
- Hotel Ukraina, Moscow
- The Carlton Moscow
- Savoy Hotel Moscow
- Swissôtel Krasnye Holmy Moscow
- Ararat Park Hotel Moscow
- Alpine Rose

== Other notable hotels ==
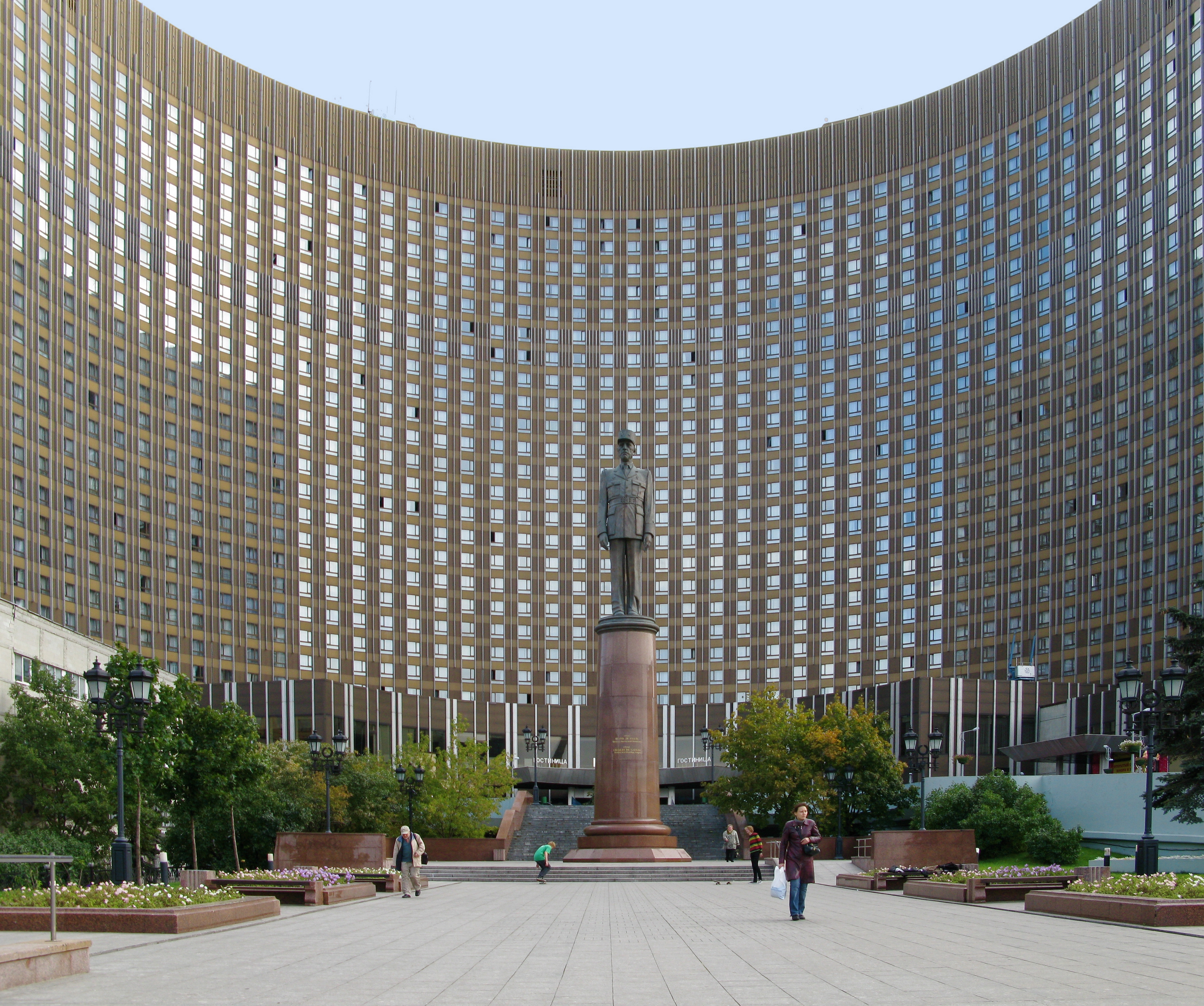
Cosmos hotel in Moscow with statue of Charles de Gaulle in front of it

- Cosmos Hotel
- Izmailovo Hotel
