= Chris K. Franzen =

Swiss chef (born 1971)

Christoph K Franzen
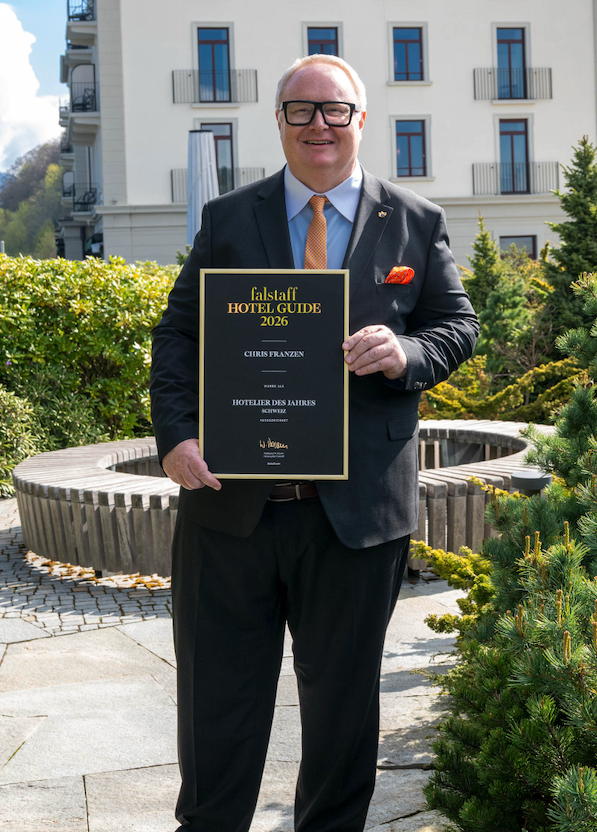
- Born: January 30, 1971 (age 55); Sion, Switzerland
- Citizenship: Swiss
- Education: Cornell University, USA; and Australian International Hotel School
- Occupations: Chef, Sommelier, Entrepreneur
- Years active: 1986 to now
- Employer(s): Hyatt Hotels, Hilton Hotels, Waldorf Astoria, Katara Hospitality, Bürgenstock Resort Lake Lucerne
- Height: 186 cm (6 ft 1 in)
- Spouse: Rachel Anne Franzen (née Capon) since 2001
- Parents: Stephan Anton Franzen (father); Verena Hildegard Franzen (née Iten), (mother)

Chris K. Franzen (born January 30, 1971) is a Swiss hospitality professional, entrepreneur, chef, sommelier, and author.

He is the CEO of Aureus Advisors LLC and managing director of the Bürgenstock Resort Lake Lucerne.

== Career ==
Franzen began his career with a chef apprenticeship at Gourmet Restaurant Wart in Hünenberg, Switzerland, in 1986, followed by a sommelier apprenticeship at Hotel and Restaurant La Porte d'Octodure in Martigny. By 1991, he transitioned into management roles, including Food & Beverage Manager at Gourmet Restaurant Glashof and Director of Food & Beverage at Kofler Inn Side in Germany, where he oversaw several pre-opening projects. He later gained international experience with roles in the U.S. and Australia, including at The Inn on Fifth and Hotel Kurrajong.

Chris joined Hyatt in 1999 and worked at the Hyatt Regency Dubai, followed by Grand Hyatt Muscat, Park Hyatt Moscow, Grand Hyatt Dubai, the Grand Hyatt Doha Hotel & Villas, the Grand Hyatt Mumbai Hotel & Residences in India till 2021. During his time with Hyatt, he held several senior corporate positions and was Area Vice President for Qatar and Oman, followed by an appointment as Area Vice President in India, managing one of the largest Hyatt portfolios outside the United States.

In 2022, Franzen served as General Manager at Waldorf Astoria Lusail Doha, opening the hotel ahead of the FIFA World Cup 2022.

In April 2024, Franzen became managing director of Bürgenstock Resort Lake Lucerne, owned by Katara Hospitality and is a Qatari sovereign wealth fund. The same year, he hosted and managed the Ukraine Peace Summit, Switzerland's largest political conference.

Franzen is the CEO of Aureus Advisors LLC, where he provides luxury hospitality consulting.

Franzen was featured in Schweiz Aktuell for managing Switzerland's largest political conference, the Ukraine Peace Summit (2024).

=== USA, Iran, Qatar and Pakistan Peace Summit ===
In June 2026, Under the leadership of Chris K. Franzen, the Bürgenstock Resort Lake Lucerne hosted the 2025–2026 Iran–United States Lake Lucerne Peace Summit in Central Switzerland, serving as the venue for diplomatic talks between the United States, Iran, Qatar, and Pakistan.

== TV Appearance ==
He also starred in the documentary Abenteuer am Golf, broadcast on Swiss and German national TV.

== Bibliography ==
- "South Africa Ride 2008 (Sahari Riders)", 2008, p:51, ASIN:B003VD1G74, Publisher:Amazon.com

== Awards & Recognition ==
- Hotelier of the Year 2026 Switzerland by Falstaff Magazine
- Newcomer of the Year, by the Karl Wild Hotel Rating in Switzerland, 2024.
- GM's Power List Middle East, included as an industry leader by Hotelier Middle East, 2023.
- Business Excellence Award, 2017
