= The Carlton Moscow =

Hotel in Moscow, Russia

Coordinates: 55.7572°N 37.6128°E

The Carlton, Moscow
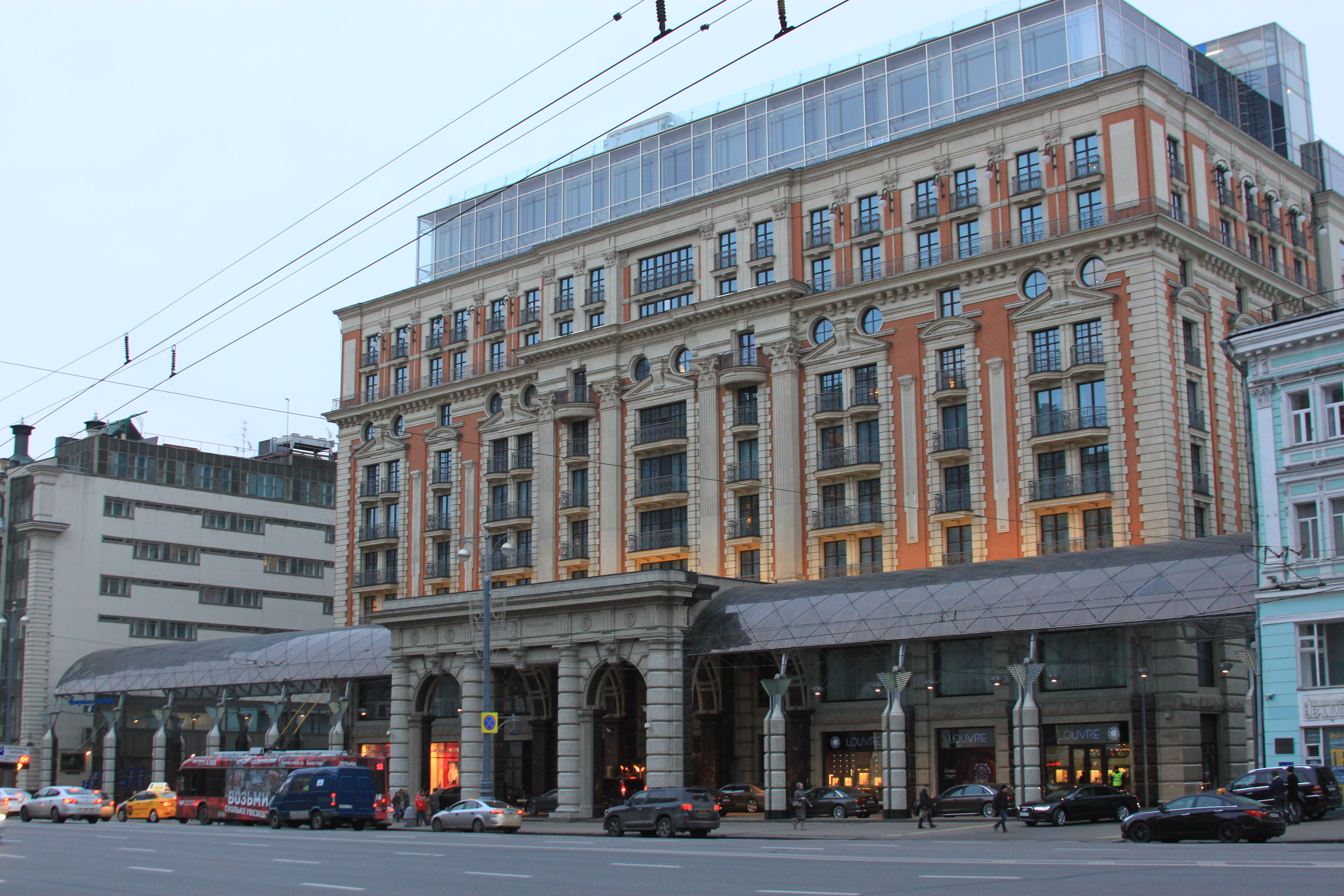
- Interactive map of the The Carlton, Moscow area

General information
- Location: 3, Tverskaya St, Moscow, Russia
- Opening: July 1, 2007
- Owner: Verny Capital

Technical details
- Floor count: 11

Design and construction
- Architect: Andrey Meyerson

Other information
- Number of rooms: 332

The Carlton, Moscow (Russian: Карлтон Москва; formerly The Ritz-Carlton, Moscow) is a 334-room 5-star luxury hotel in the centre of Moscow.

== History ==
The Ritz-Carlton, Moscow was developed by Kazakh property development group Capital Partners and financed by Merrill Lynch Capital Markets Bank and Aareal Bank. It was designed by Andrey Meyerson and constructed between 2005-2007, on the site of the demolished Hotel Intourist. It opened on July 1, 2007. The hotel was sold in 2011 for $600 million to Verny Capital, a Kazakh private equity firm, whose chief investor is Kazakh billionaire Bulat Utemuratov. That same year, CNN reported that the hotel's Ritz-Carlton Suite was one of the 15 most expensive hotel rooms in the world.

The hotel ceased to be managed by The Ritz-Carlton Hotel Company division of Marriott International on July 5, 2022, when Marriott severed its relationship with all 22 of its properties in Russia, due to sanctions imposed on Russia in response to the 2022 Russian invasion of Ukraine. It was renamed The Carlton, Moscow on July 8, 2022.

== Gallery ==
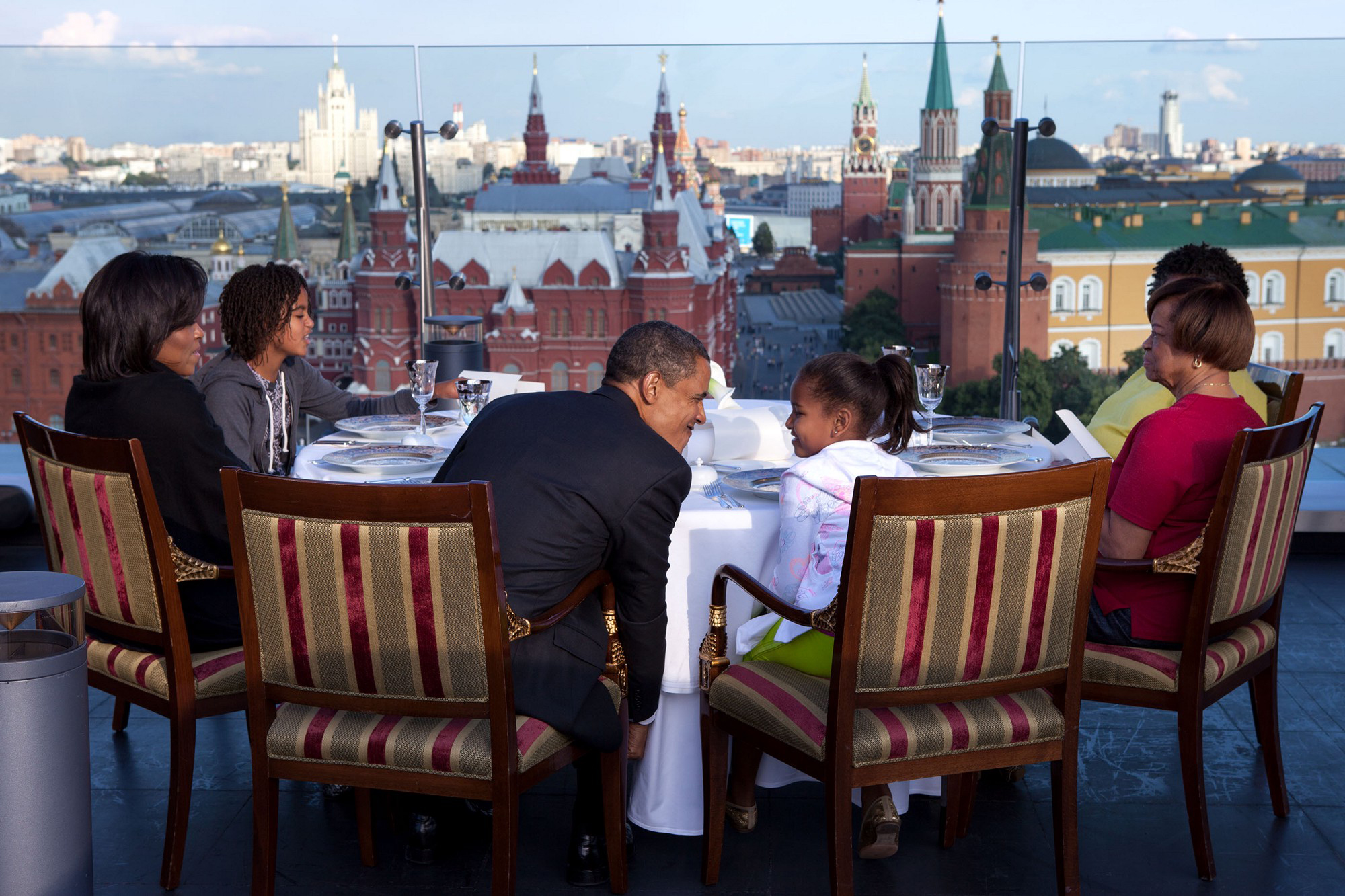
The Obama family dining on the hotel rooftop, July 2009

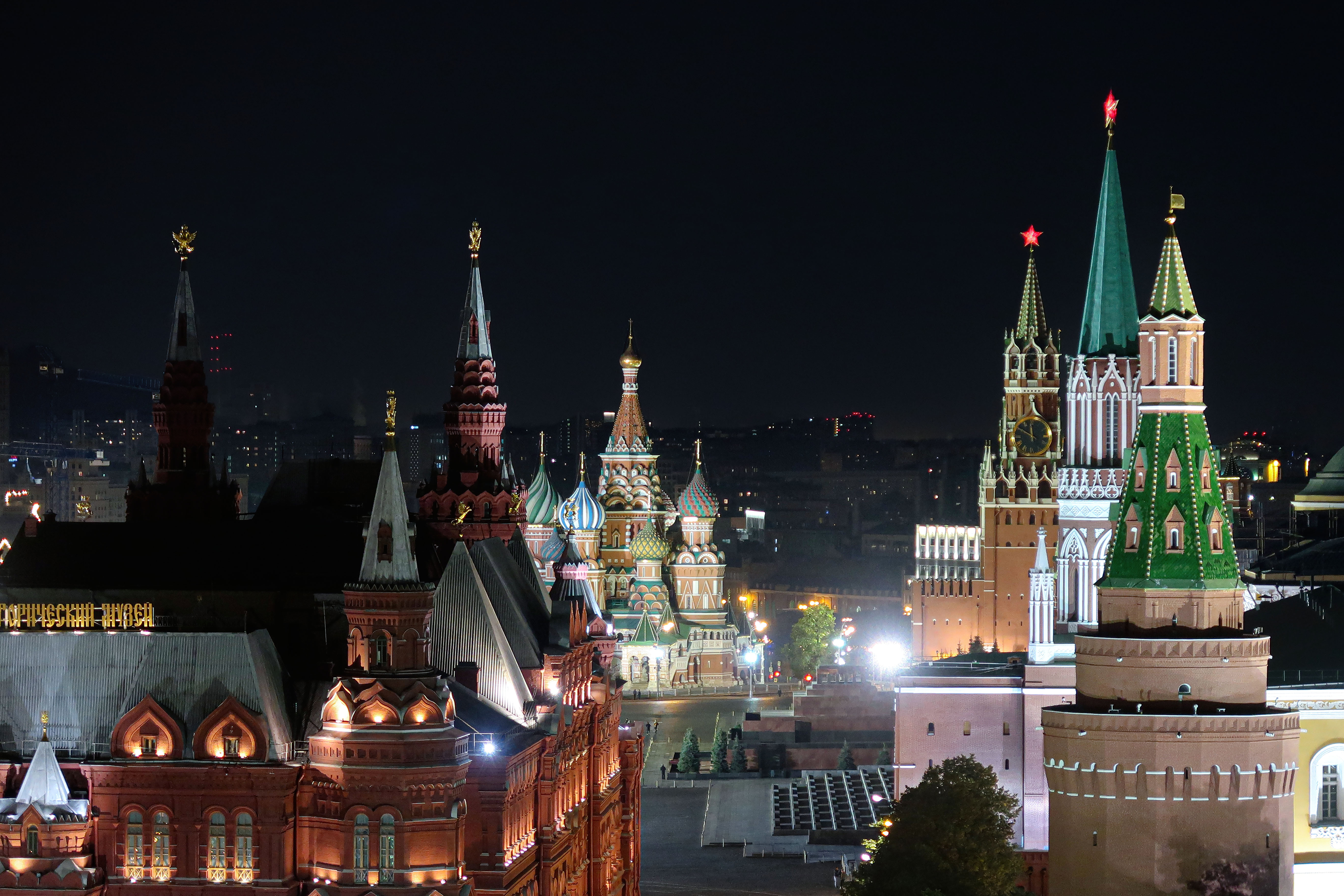
The Moscow Kremlin and Saint Basil's Cathedral viewed from the rooftop at night

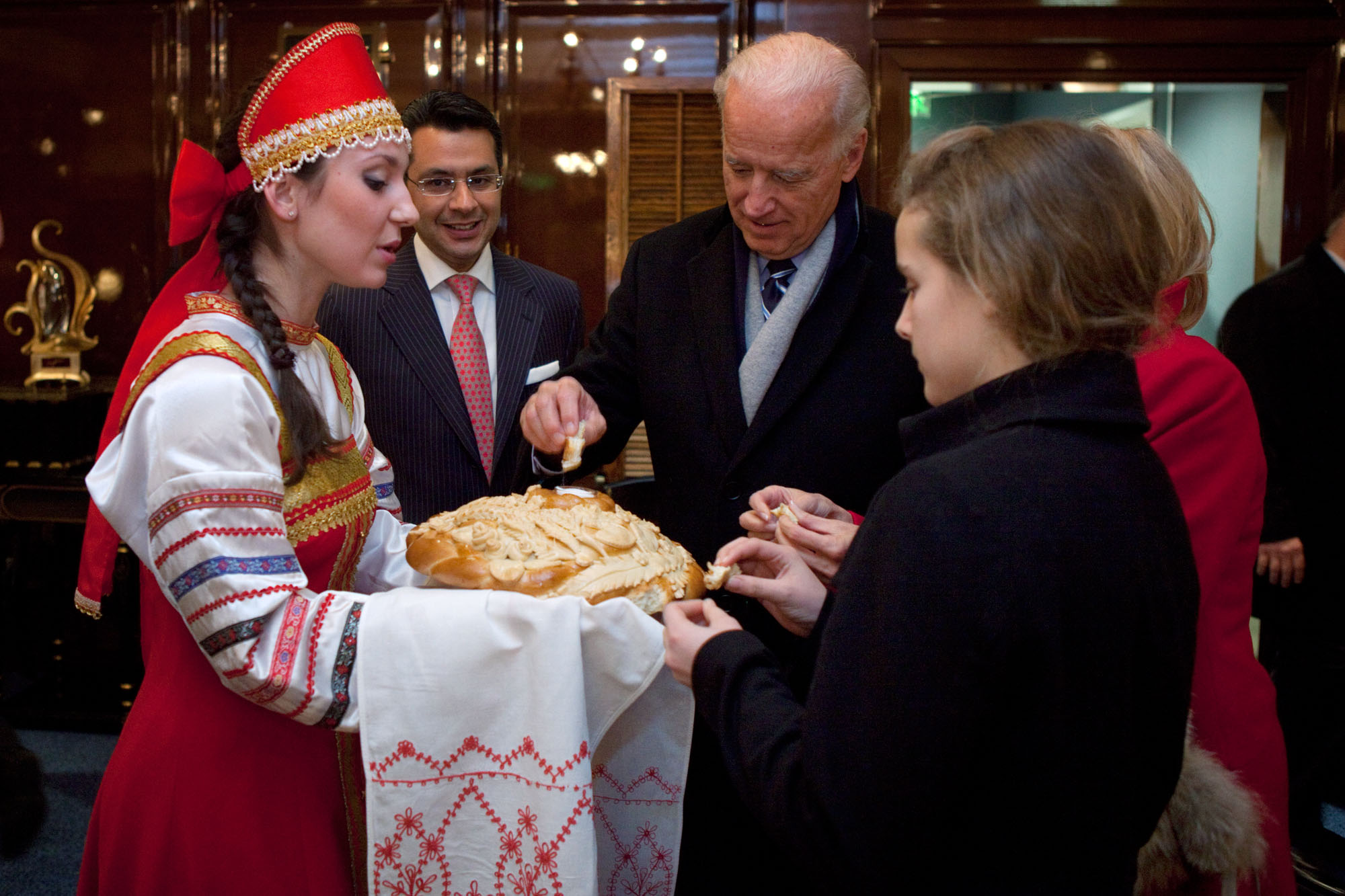
Joe and Jill Biden at a welcoming ceremony in the hotel, March 2011

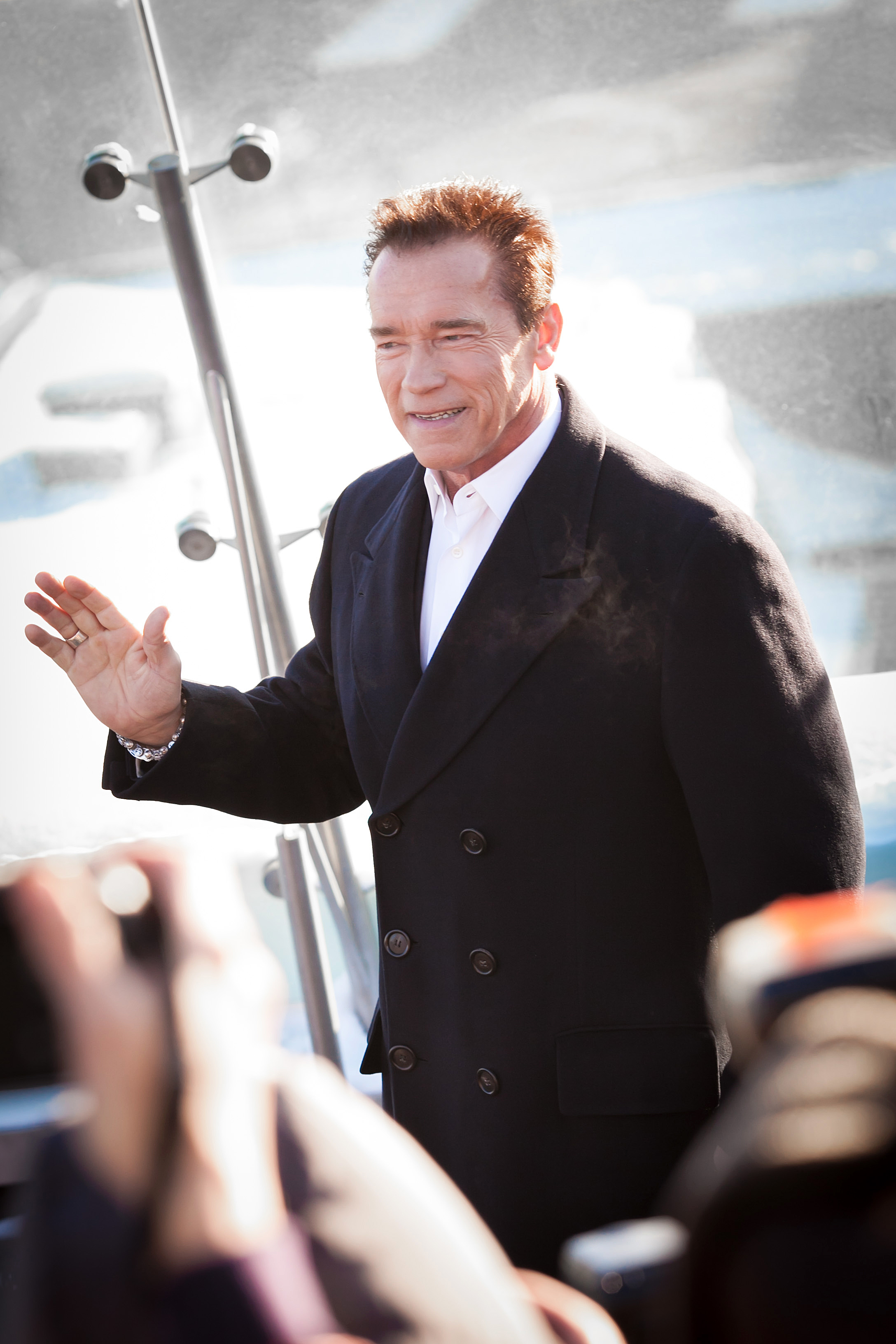
Arnold Schwarzenegger at a film presentation in the hotel, January 2013

== See also ==
- Four Seasons Hotel Moscow
- Lotte Hotel Moscow
