= Hotel Intourist =

Former hotel in Moscow, Russia

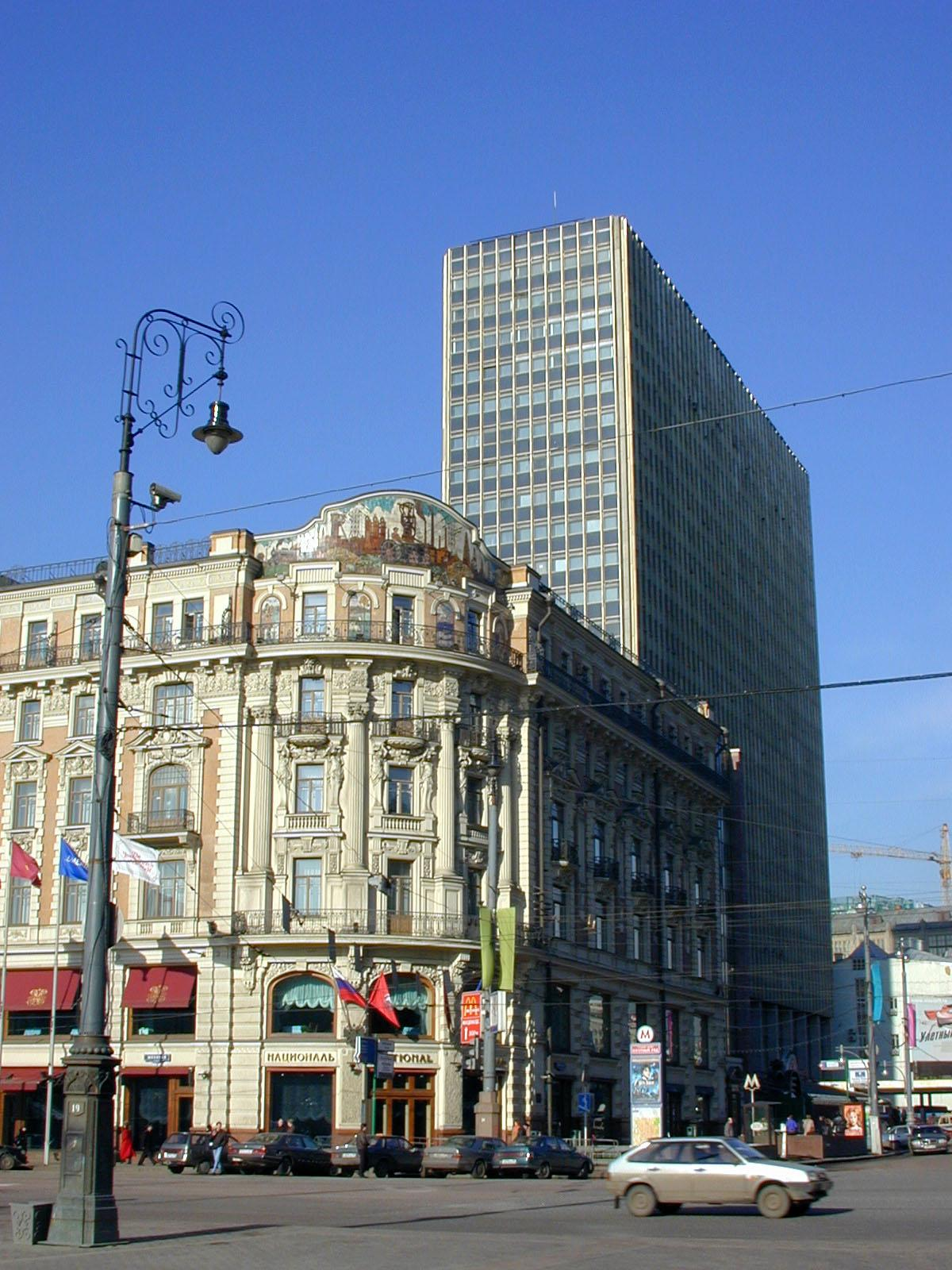
- Hotel Intourist, behind the Hotel National
- Interactive map of the Hotel Intourist area

General information
- Location: Moscow, Russia
- Opening: 1970
- Closed: January 7, 2002
- Cost: $180 million

Technical details
- Floor count: 22

Design and construction
- Architects: Vsevolod Voskresensky, Yury Sheverdrayev Aleksandr Boltinov

Other information
- Number of rooms: 436

The Hotel Intourist (Russian: гости́ница «Интурист») was a hotel in Moscow, Russia. It was built in 1970 as a hotel exclusively for foreign tourists to the Soviet Union. In 2002 the hotel was closed and demolished. The Carlton Moscow now stands on the site.

== History ==
The hotel was built in 1970 by the Soviet state-owned travel monopoly Intourist on Tverskaya Street just north of Red Square. It was the tallest reinforced concrete structure in Moscow. The hallways were decorated with three stained glass works designed by Leonid Polishchuk and Svetlana Shcherbinina. The images, which included nude figures in "Man and Woman", were somewhat scandalous at the time. In 1983 the Hotel Intourist was merged with the adjacent Hotel National and the hotels operated under joint management until the National closed in 1989.

In April 1999, an explosion set in an elevator on the 20th floor injured 11 people and ripped through the 17th floor. The bomb exploded near the offices of Russian singer and State Duma deputy Joseph Kobzon. No suspects were apprehended in the explosion.

After the fall of the Soviet Union, luxury hotels catering to western guests quickly entered the market and the hotel quickly became dated. Moscow Mayor Yury Luzhkov called it a "rotting tooth" on Tverskaya Street. The hotel closed on January 7, 2002 after the last guests checked out and the city began demolition shortly thereafter. The property was taken down in pieces by cranes and many of the materials were recycled. The glass was sold off, the concrete was turned into crushed stone and the rebar was melted down.
