= Alpine Rose (hotel) =

- Альпийская роза (гостиница)
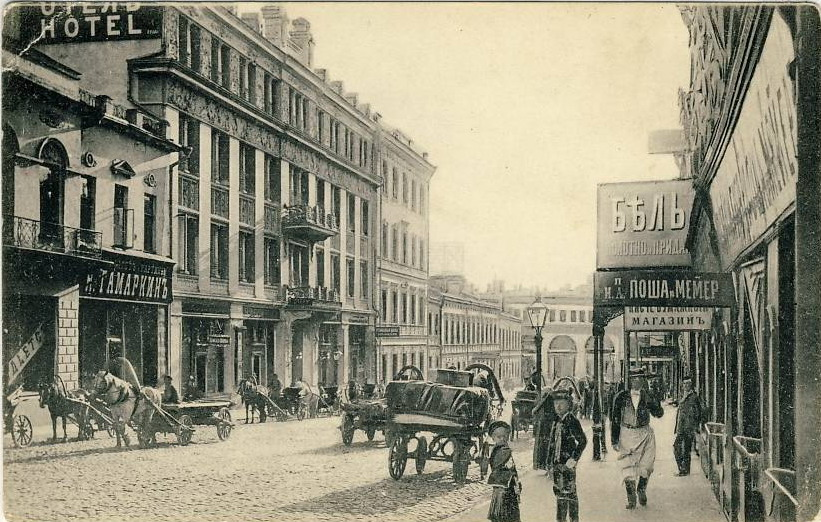
- The Alpine Rose in 1904-1906
- 55.7606°N 37.6224°E
- Location: Cannon Street house 4 building 1, Moscow, Russia
- Type: Building

Alpine Rose (Russian: Альпийская роза) is a historical building which was built in 1901-1902 as a project of architect A. A. Ostrogradsky in the Art Nouveau style. The building has the status of an identified cultural heritage site. A Russian State Circus is currently residing in the building.

== History of the building ==
At the end of the 18th century, a two-story stone building was built on the site of the present house along Pushnaya Street. In 1821, the building belonged to the general (or possibly colonel) A. V. Argamakov. In 1848, one of the outhouses was opened as the "printing house of Alexander Semen." Later, the building housed the "printing house of SP Yakovlev," a shop for tableware and crystal glassware from the Gardner and Maltsev factories, photo shops and shops. In the 1870s, the restaurant "Under the Alpine Rose" was opened in the building, later named "Alpine Rose" (German: «Alpenrose»).

In the 1880s, when the building belonged to Princess OA Turkestanova-Argamakova, the property was divided into 2 parts. In 1901-1902 on the site of the left side of the property with the preservation of the walls was built a new four-story hotel "Alpine Rose" designed by architect A. A. Ostrogradsky (now house 4, building 1). In 1911-1912, on the basis of the right part of the building, the restaurant Alpine Rose (now House 4, Building 2) was built with the assistance of A. A. Vesnin under the design of engineer P. P. Visnevsky.
