= Ararat Park Hotel Moscow =

Hotel in Moscow, Russia

Coordinates: 55.7600°N 37.6218°E

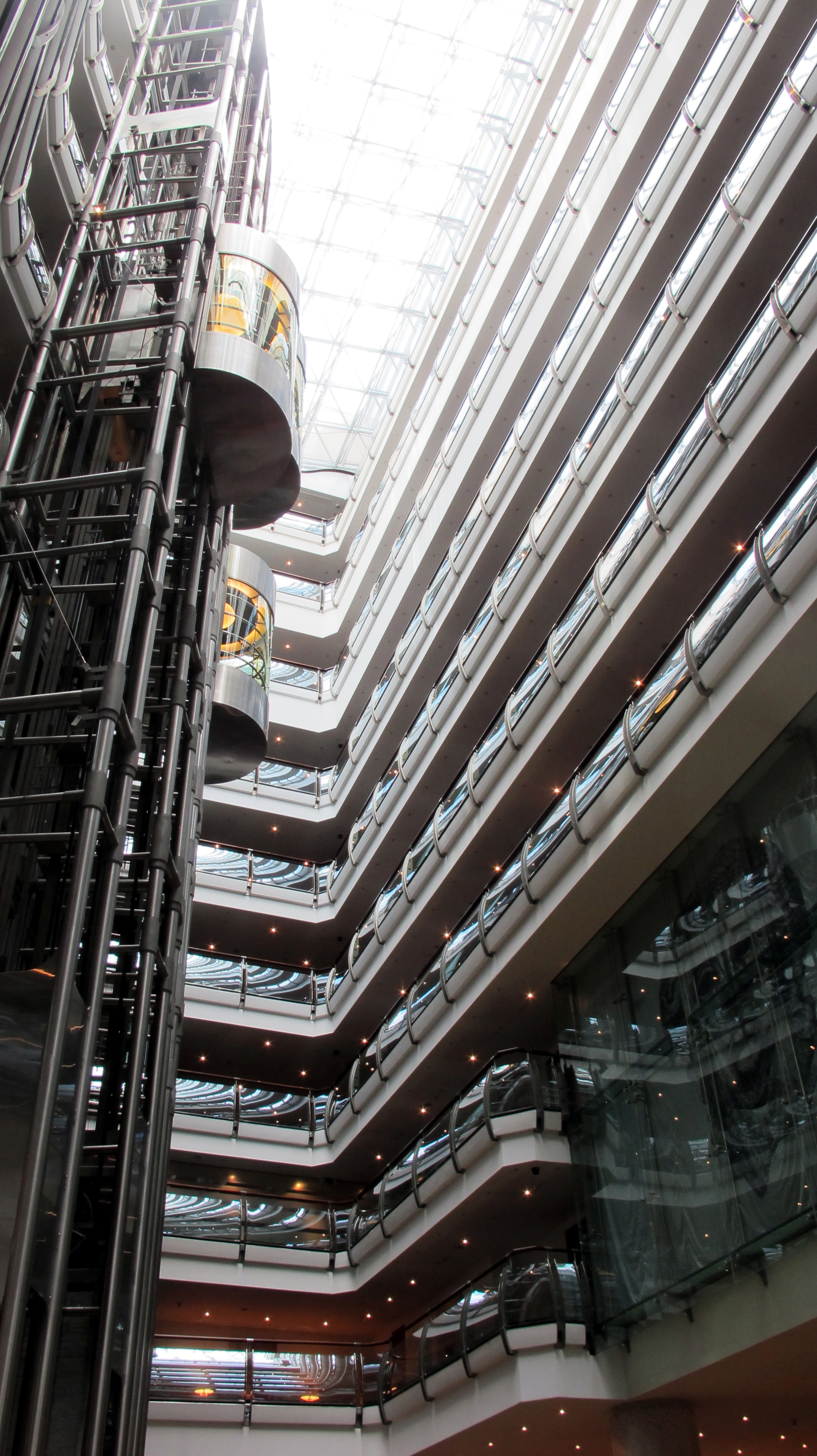

- Location within Central Moscow

General information
- Location: 4 Neglinnaya Street, Moscow, Russia
- Opening: 2002
- Owner: Samvel Sargsyan

Technical details
- Floor count: 11

Design and construction
- Architect: Murad Sargsyan

Other information
- Number of rooms: 206

The Ararat Park Hotel Moscow is a five-star hotel in central Moscow, built in 2002 as the Ararat Park Hyatt Moscow by Murad Sargsyan, a Russian-Armenian businessman. Today, it belongs to his brother Samvel Sargsyan, who was the governor of Armenia's Vayots Dzor province from 2003 to 2007 and a member of the National Assembly of Armenia from 2007 to 2012 from the Republican Party of Armenia.

The hotel was constructed on the location of an Armenia Hotel and Armenian restaurant "Ararat", which were located on this site until 1988.

The modern building encompasses elements of Armenian architecture.

Hyatt severed their relationship with the hotel on May 12, 2022, as a result of sanctions following the 2022 Russian invasion of Ukraine.
