= Lotte Hotel Moscow =

Hotel in Moscow, Russia

Coordinates: 55°45′04″N 37°35′03″E

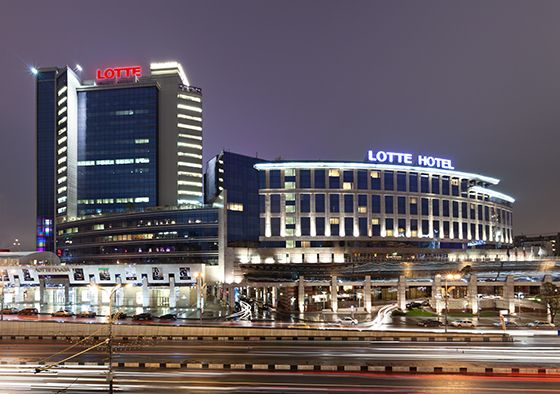

- Location within Central Moscow
- Hotel chain: Lotte Hotels & Resorts

General information
- Location: Moscow, Russia
- Opening: 2010

Other information
- Number of rooms: 300
- Parking: 3 levels

Website
- www.lottehotel.ru/en/

The Lotte Hotel Moscow (Лотте Отель Москва) is a 5 star hotel in Moscow, opened in 2010, situated at the intersection of New Arbat Avenue and Novinsky Boulevard. The Lotte Group got its name from “Charlotte”, the main character of Goethe’s masterpiece.

Lotte Hotel Moscow is the first hotel of the Lotte Hotels & Resorts chain outside of Korea. Lotte Hotels & Resorts is owned by the Lotte Group.
