= Belorusskaya (Zamoskvoretskaya line) =

Moscow Metro station

Belorusskaya Белорусская
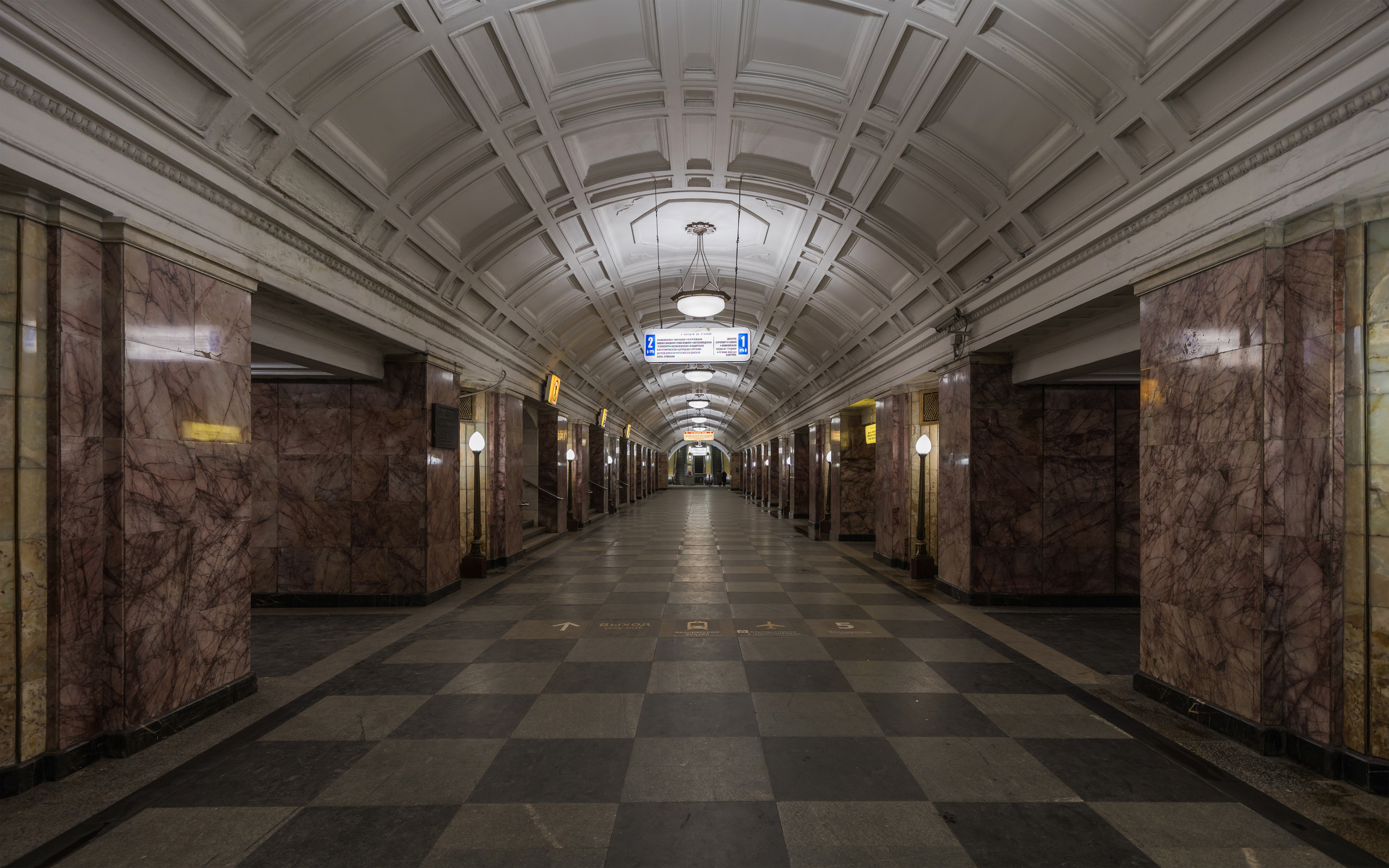

General information
- Location: Tverskoy District; Central Administrative Okrug; Moscow; Russia
- Coordinates: 55.7767°N 37.5835°E
- System: Moscow Metro station
- Owner: Moskovsky Metropoliten
- Line: Zamoskvoretskaya line
- Platforms: 1 island platform
- Tracks: 2
- Connections: Bus: м1, м32, е30, е30к, 27, 82, 116, 345, с356, 366, 382, с484, с532, 905, т18, т54, т56, т70, т78; night routes: н1, н12; Tram: 7, 9

Construction
- Depth: 33.1 metres (109 ft)
- Platform levels: 1
- Parking: No

Other information
- Station code: 035

History
- Opened: 11 September 1938; 87 years ago

Services
Preceding station	Moscow Metro	Following station
Dinamo towards Khovrino	Zamoskvoretskaya line	Mayakovskaya towards Alma-Atinskaya
Krasnopresnenskaya anticlockwise / outer	Koltsevaya line transfer at Belorusskaya	Novoslobodskaya clockwise / inner
Route map
Location
- Location within Central Moscow

Belorusskaya (Russian: Белору́сская) is a Moscow Metro station on the Zamoskvoretskaya line. Designed by architects Ivan Taranov and Nadezhda Bykova, it was opened in 1938 as part of the second stage of the Moscow Metro.

== Name ==
The station is named after the nearby Belorussky Rail Terminal, from which westward trains towards Belarus and western Europe depart.

== Design ==
The station is decorated with national Belarusian motives, which include the facing of rectangular pylons faced with pink marble from Birobidzhan on the exterior and with black davalu marble in the passageway to the platforms. Bronze floor-lamps decorate the pylon niches, in the end of the central hall is a bust of Vladimir Lenin.

The station underwent several modernisations which slightly altered its original design. The floor, initially being based on Belarusian national ornaments, was replaced with square tiles of black and grey marble. The walls also initially covered with indigo ceramic tiles were replaced by indigo marble in 2004.

In 1952, a series of staircases was added to the southern side of the central hall, and a transfer to Belorusskaya station on the Koltsevaya line was opened. In 1958 the first cruise control system in the Moscow Metro was tested on Belorusskaya, with a photoelement installed on a train.

== Traffic ==
The station receives 139,700 passengers per day from the Koltsevaya line and 45,950 from its vestibule, built into the Belorussky Rail Terminal.

== Gallery ==
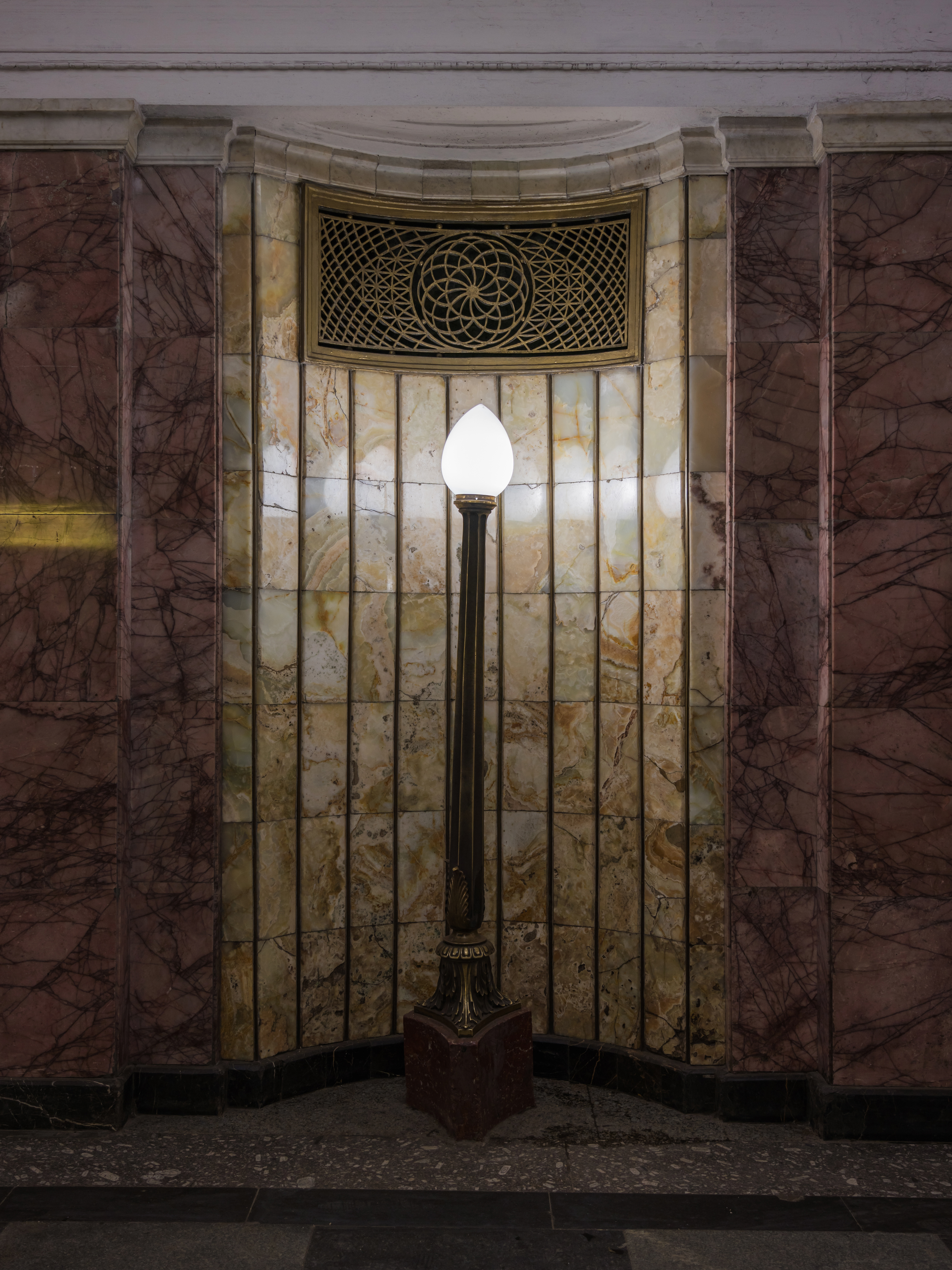
Pylon niches

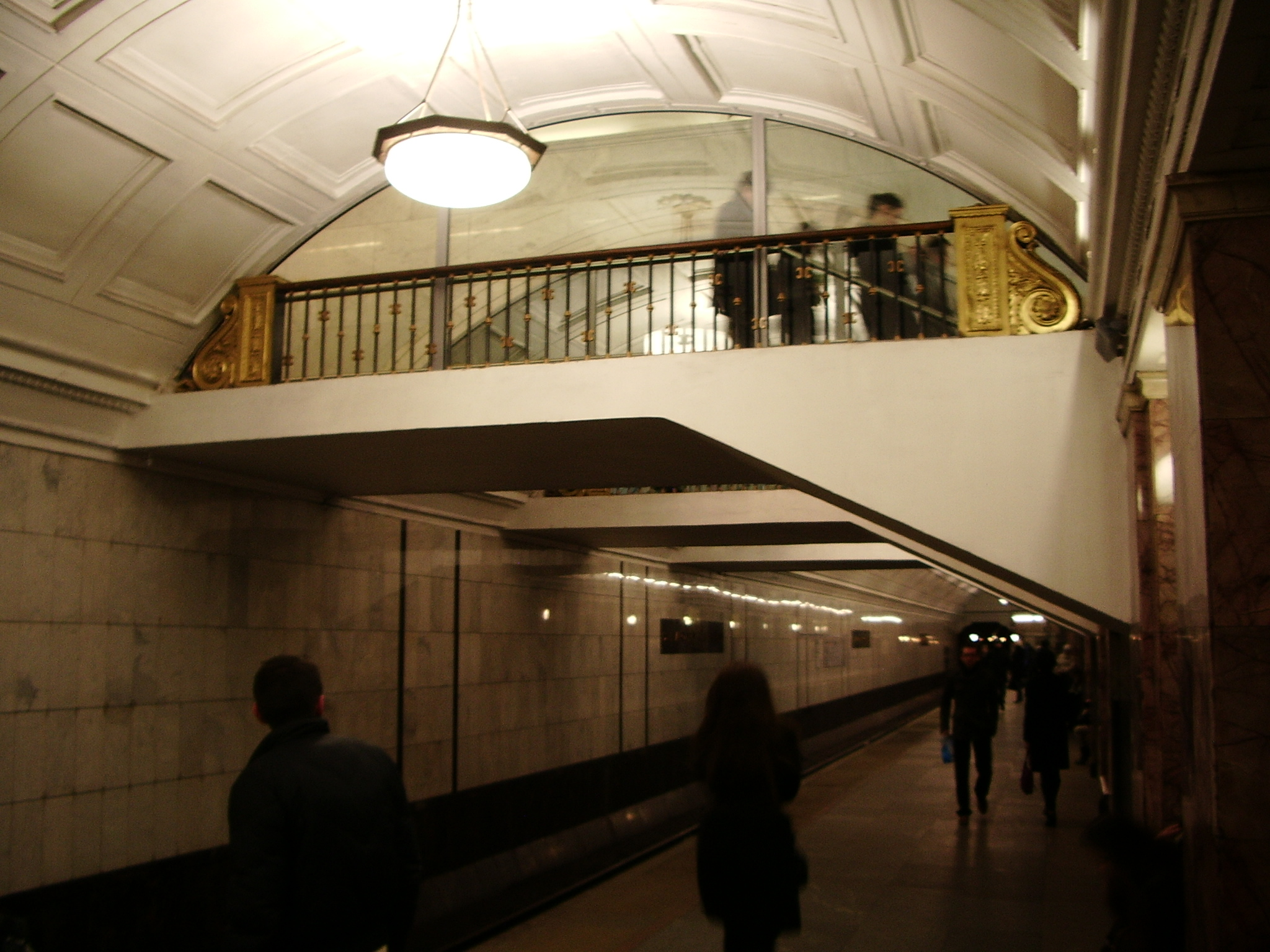
Station platform. Note the upper pass is the connection to the Koltsevaya line.

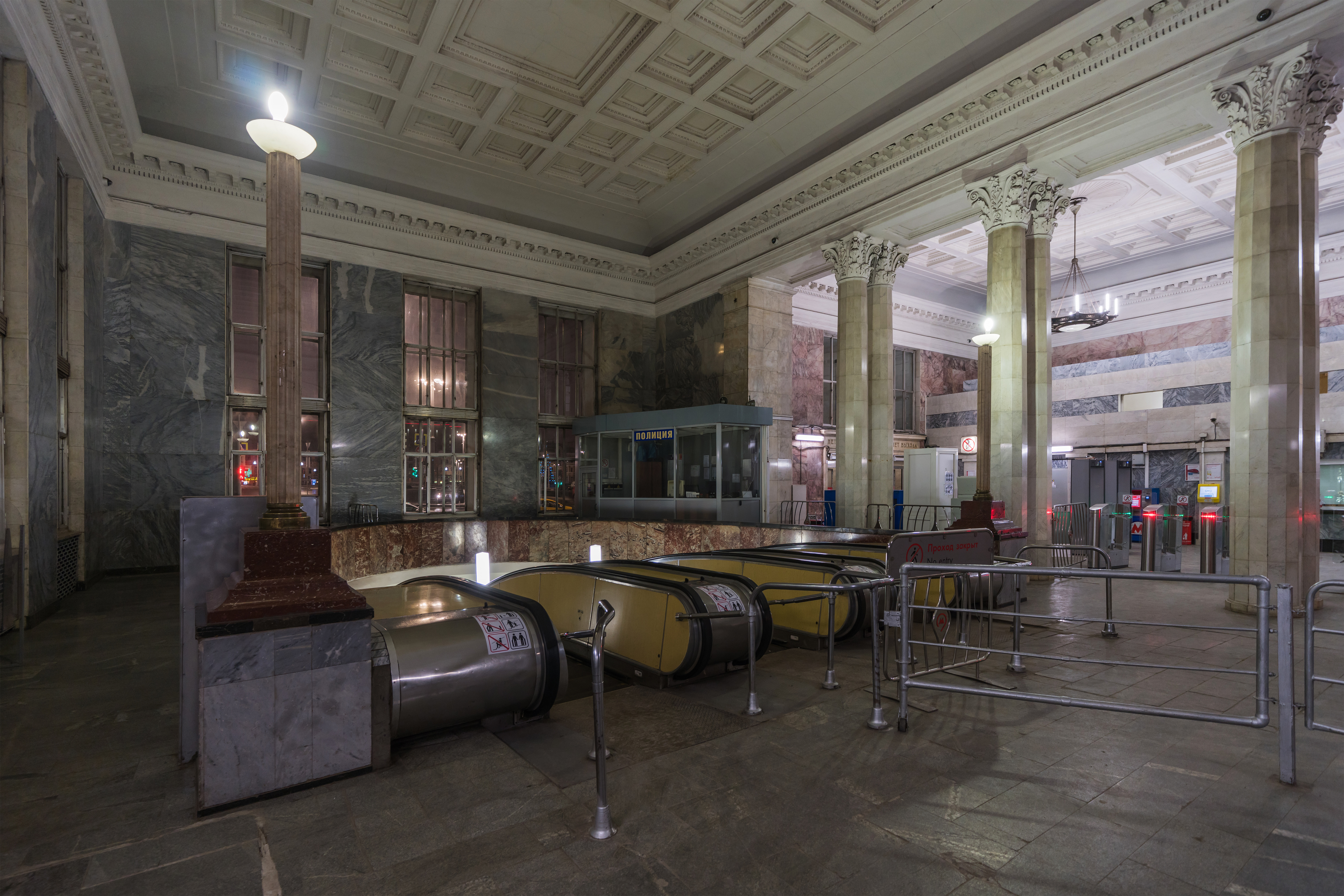
Escalators
