= Tsvetnoy Bulvar =

Moscow Metro station

Tsvetnoy Bulvar Цветной бульвар
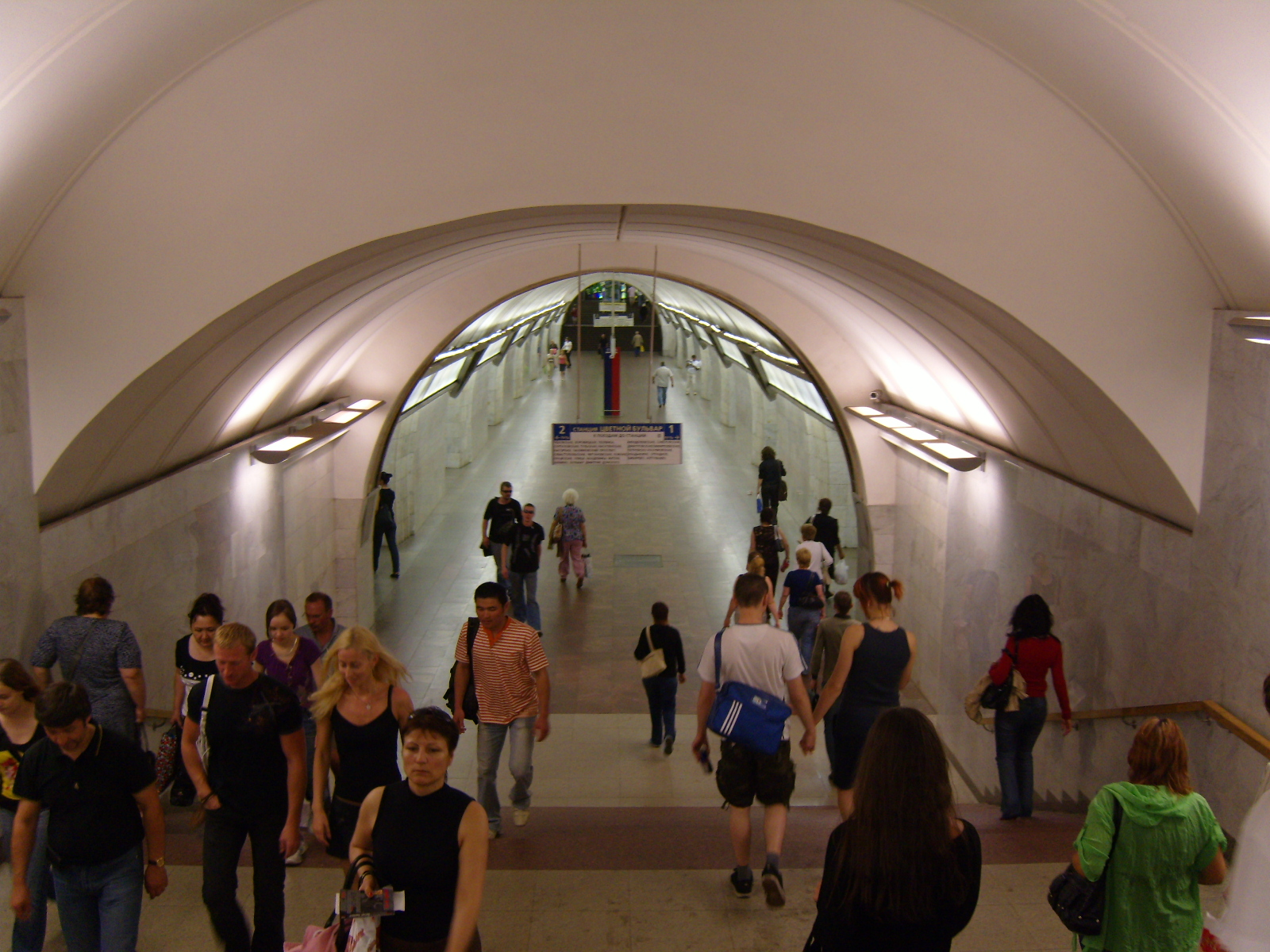

General information
- Location: 19 Tverskoy Boulevard; Tverskoy District; Central Administrative Okrug; Moscow; Russia
- Coordinates: 55.7708°N 37.6187°E
- System: Moscow Metro station
- Owner: Moskovsky Metropoliten
- Line: Serpukhovsko-Timiryazevskaya line
- Platforms: 1 island platform
- Tracks: 2
- Connections: Bus: 24; Trolleybus: 13, 31

Construction
- Structure type: Pillar-type three-vaulted deep-level station
- Depth: 50 metres (160 ft)
- Platform levels: 1
- Parking: Yes

Other information
- Station code: 138

History
- Opened: 31 December 1988; 37 years ago

Services
Preceding station	Moscow Metro	Following station
Mendeleyevskaya towards Altufyevo	Serpukhovsko-Timiryazevskaya line	Chekhovskaya towards Bulvar Dmitriya Donskogo
Dostoyevskaya towards Fiztekh	Lyublinsko-Dmitrovskaya line transfer at Trubnaya	Sretensky Bulvar towards Zyablikovo
Route map
Location
- Location within Central Moscow

Tsvetnoy Bulvar (Russian: Цветно́й бульва́р, English: Colourful Boulevard) is a Moscow Metro station on the Serpukhovsko-Timiryazevskaya Line, in the Tverskoy District of central Moscow. It was opened on 31 December 1988.

== Name ==
It is named after Tsvetnoy Boulevard.

== Location ==
The entrance vestibule is located on Tsvetnoy Boulevard, close to the Moscow Circus on Tsvetnoy Boulevard. Its proximity to the circus is reflected in the subject of the green stained glass seen in the entrance hall above the stairs. Which has images of clowns .

== Transfers ==
Since 2007, the station provides transfer to the Trubnaya station of the Lyublinskaya Line.
