= Begovoy =

Begovoy (masculine), Begovaya (feminine), or Begovoye (neuter) may refer to:

- Begovoy District, a district of Northern Administrative Okrug of Moscow, Russia
- Begovaya (Moscow Metro), a station of the Moscow Metro, Moscow, Russia
