= Trubnaya (Moscow Metro) =

Moscow Metro station

Trubnaya Трубная
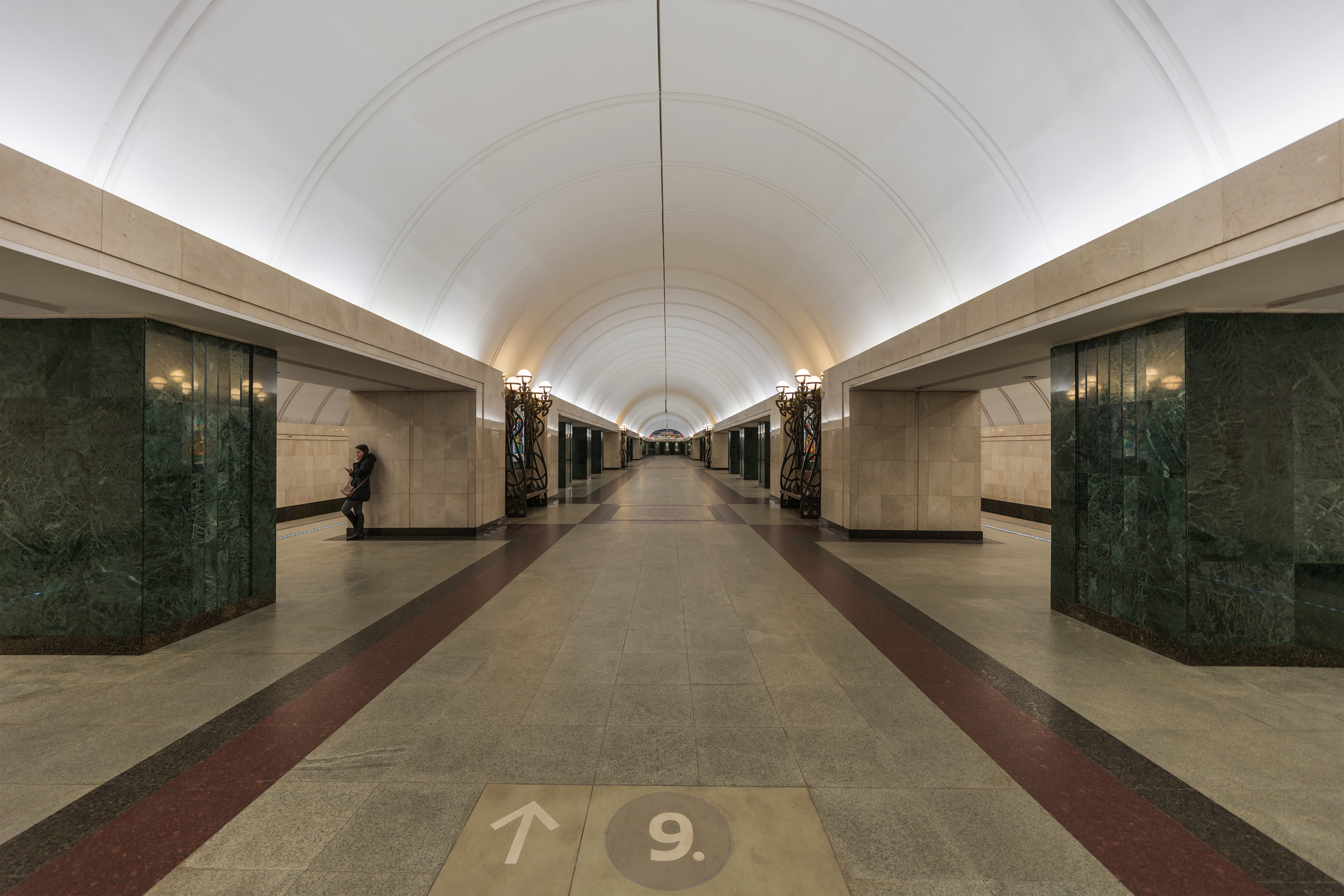

General information
- Location: Tverskoy District, Central Administrative Okrug; Moscow; Russia
- Coordinates: 55.7688°N 37.6200°E
- System: Moscow Metro station
- Owner: Moskovsky Metropoliten
- Line: Lyublinsko-Dmitrovskaya line
- Platforms: 1 island platform
- Tracks: 2
- Connections: Bus: 15, 24; Trolleybus: 3, 13, 31, 31k

Construction
- Depth: 60 metres (200 ft)
- Platform levels: 1
- Parking: No

Other information
- Station code: 166

History
- Opened: 30 August 2007; 18 years ago

Services
Preceding station	Moscow Metro	Following station
Dostoevskaya towards Fiztekh	Lyublinsko-Dmitrovskaya line	Sretensky Bulvar towards Zyablikovo
Mendeleyevskaya towards Altufyevo	Serpukhovsko-Timiryazevskaya line transfer at Tsvetnoy Bulvar	Chekhovskaya towards Bulvar Dmitriya Donskogo
Route map
Location
- Location within Central Moscow

Trubnaya (Russian: Тру́бная) is a Moscow Metro station in the Tverskoy District, Central Administrative Okrug, Moscow. It is on the Lyublinsko-Dmitrovskaya Line, between Dostoyevskaya and Sretensky Bulvar stations.

Trubnaya opened on 30 August 2007 as a part of the long-awaited line extension northwesternwards. It was a northwestern terminus of the line until June 2010.

== Name ==
It is named after Trubnaya Square.

== Transfer ==
It offers a transfer to the Tsvetnoy Bulvar station on the Serpukhovsko-Timiryazevskaya Line. Transfer to Tsvetoy Boulevard station is achieved in a two part process that involves an ascent into an interim hall and then a walk to the older station.

== History ==
Construction of the station began as far back as 1984, during the building of Tsvetnoy Bulvar station which set provisions for the future station, and during the late 1980s was fully underway with plans to open by the late 1990s. However the dissolution of the Soviet Union in 1991 put a long delay to construction which at time stood frozen, and, despite a few slow restarts, remained derelict. Only in 2005 when proper funding finally came did the works resume. The station was opened just in two years, on 30 August 2007.

== Design ==
Architecturally the station is a tri-vault wall column design with a monolithic concrete plate on the floor. The theme, work of architects V. Fillipov, S. Petrosyan, A. Ruban, T. Silakadze, T. Petrova and S. Prytkova, is based on Moscow and old Russian cities. The portals, cornices and station walls are faced with warm beige marble. Contrasting with that is the dark green marble used for columns, and for panels between the portals as well as for panels on the station walls. The floor features a geometric layout which repeats the portals out of polished dark green, black and light grey granite. Lighting is achieved by hidden fluorescent lamps behind the portal cornices which unite every four passages between the central and the platform halls. The vaults of the central (9.5 metre diameter) and the platform halls are covered with white fibreglass to offer extra hydroisolation.

Decoration of the station is centered on the 12 wall columns. Each of these feature a wooden bench surrounded by a black ironwork frame that supports four spherical lamps on the top, giving the impression of a traditional Moscow boulevard. However the central feature of this is an illuminated stained glass mosaic with an image of a historic Russian city (such as Rostov, Novgorod, Yaroslavl and others), all work of Zurab Tsereteli. The author is also responsible for two large mosaics which decorate the portals of the escalator tunnels upon leaving the station.

The vestibule of the station is located under the intersection of the Tsvetnoy Boulevard and the Boulevard Ring and the Trubnaya Square for which the station is named.
