= Mendeleyevskaya =

Moscow Metro station

Mendeleyevskaya Менделеевская
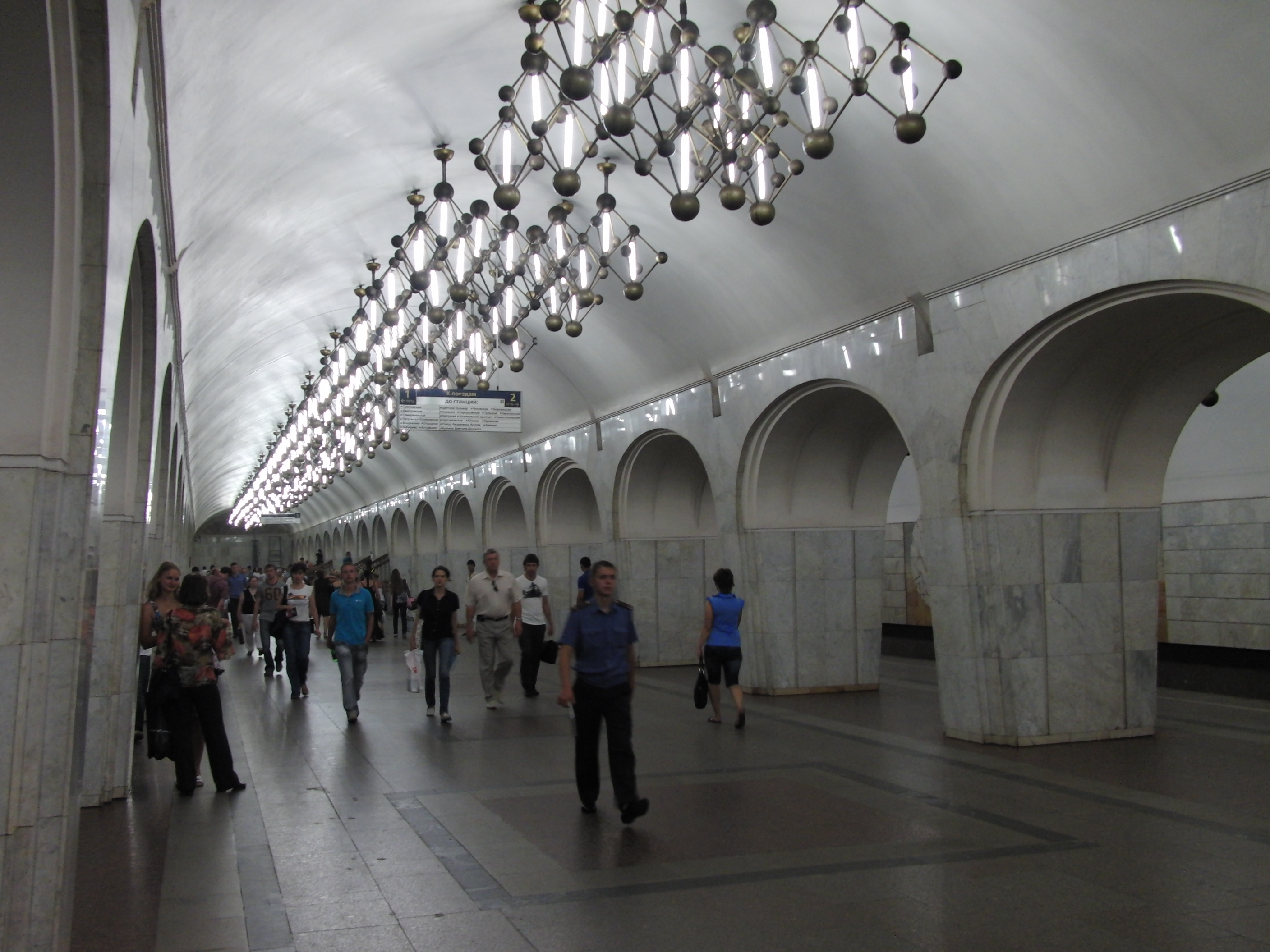

General information
- Location: Tverskoy District; Central Administrative Okrug; Moscow; Russia
- Coordinates: 55.7810°N 37.6011°E
- System: Moscow Metro station
- Owner: Moskovsky Metropoliten
- Line: Serpukhovsko-Timiryazevskaya line
- Platforms: 1 island platform
- Tracks: 2

Construction
- Structure type: deep level column station, triple-vault
- Depth: 48.5 metres (159 ft)
- Platform levels: 1
- Parking: No

Other information
- Station code: 137

History
- Opened: 31 December 1988; 37 years ago

Services
Preceding station	Moscow Metro	Following station
Savyolovskaya towards Altufyevo	Serpukhovsko-Timiryazevskaya line	Tsvetnoy Bulvar towards Bulvar Dmitriya Donskogo
Belorusskaya anticlockwise / outer	Koltsevaya line transfer at Novoslobodskaya	Suvorovskaya clockwise / inner
Route map
Location
- Location within Central Moscow

Mendeleyevskaya (Russian: Менделе́евская,) is a Moscow Metro station on the Serpukhovsko-Timiryazevskaya Line. It is located in the Tverskoy District of central Moscow.

It was opened on 31 December 1988. The station was designed by Nina Aleshina and Natalya Samoilova keeping to the theme of Dmitri Mendeleev and his works.

Its depth is 48.5 meters (159 ft). The transfer to the Novoslobodskaya station of the Koltsevaya Line is available.

== History ==
The station was opened on 31 December 1988 as part of the Chekhovskaya — Savelovskaya section, after which it became the 138th operational station in the Moscow Metro. The initial proposal was to name the station Novoslobodskaya, as well as the current station on the Ring Line. Upon opening, it was named after the namesake of the nearby D. Mendeleev University of Chemical Technology of Russia.

== Description ==
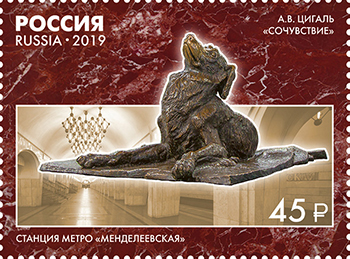
Monument Compassion on 2019 stamp of Russia

The station hall is coated with white marble, and the floor is lined with gray and black granite. The track walls are decorated with inserts featuring stylized images of the deformation electron density of various binary molecules. The idea of inserts was proposed by the staff of D. I. Mendeleev Russian University of Chemical Technology, who took an active part in the development of the station's design. Moreover, the station lamps are designed in way to resemble the structure of crystal lattice. From the center of the hall, stairways lead to the koltsevaya line station "Novoslobodskaya". The arches of the station halls are supported by columns through shaped wedge-shaped lintels.

A stray dog named Malchik lived at the station, and after he was killed in 2001 as a result of a conflict with a local resident walking a purebred dog, a monument Compassion (Russian: Сочувствие) was erected in the station.

== See also ==
- Malchik
