= Barrikadnaya =

Moscow Metro station

Barrikadnaya Баррикадная
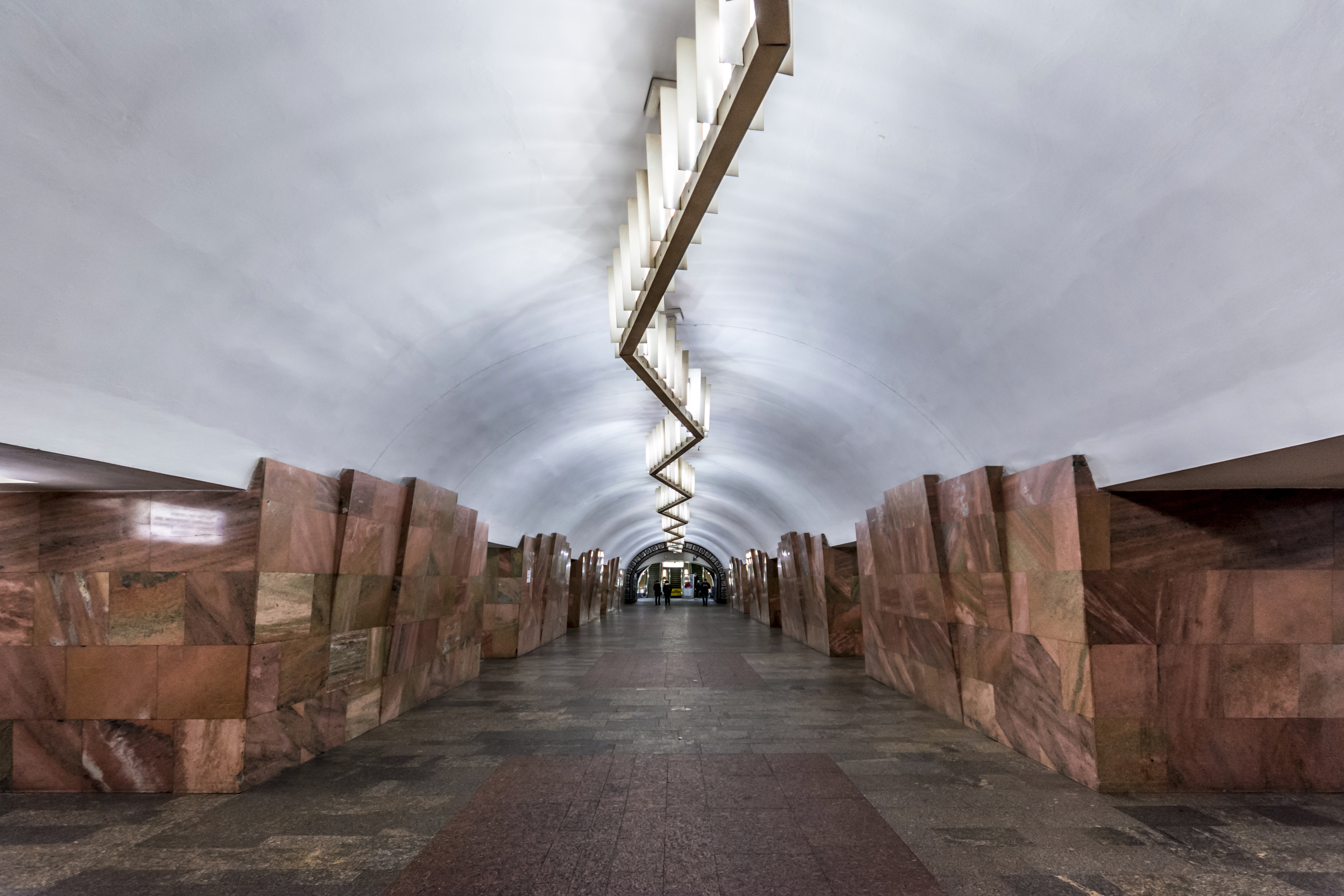

General information
- Location: Presnensky District, Central Administrative Okrug; Moscow; Russia
- Coordinates: 55.7612°N 37.5795°E
- System: Moscow Metro station
- Owner: Moskovsky Metropoliten
- Line: Tagansko-Krasnopresnenskaya line
- Platforms: 1 island platform
- Tracks: 2
- Connections: Bus: 116; Trolleybus: 35

Construction
- Depth: 30 metres (98 ft)
- Platform levels: 1
- Parking: No

Other information
- Station code: 120

History
- Opened: 30 December 1972; 53 years ago

Services
Preceding station	Moscow Metro	Following station
Ulitsa 1905 Goda towards Planernaya	Tagansko-Krasnopresnenskaya line	Pushkinskaya towards Kotelniki
Kiyevskaya anticlockwise / outer	Koltsevaya line transfer at Krasnopresnenskaya	Belorusskaya clockwise / inner
Route map
Location
- Location within Central Moscow

Barrikadnaya (Russian: Баррикадная) is a station on the Tagansko-Krasnopresnenskaya Line of the Moscow Metro. It is named after the events of the Revolution of 1905, when it was a site for barricades on Krasnaya Presnya street. The station was opened in 1972 as the first station on the Krasnopresenenskiy line, and for three years was its southern terminus, until the tunnel to Pushkinskaya connected it to the Zhdanovskiy line.

The station was built following a typical pylon design, but due to unfavourable underlying geological conditions the pylons eventually had to be widened. The station architects Strelkov and Polikarpova used pink and red marble in the pylons. The walls use with different shades of pink, red, blue and grey marble. The central hall had to be extended as the station was initially designed for extended seven-carriage trains (although the line has been using eight-carriages since the late 1980s). The entrances to the central hall are all decorated with metallic artworks.

The entrance to the station is located on Barrikadnaya Street, which links Krasnaya Presnya with the Garden Ring, and is externally decorated with stone artwork depicting the events of 1905. Across the road is one of Stalin's Seven Sisters skyscrapers. From the opposite end of the central hall there is a transfer to the Krasnopresnenskaya station of the Koltsevaya Line

The daily passenger traffic of the station amounts to 32,400 people via the station entrance, and 118,500 using the transfer.
