= Malchik =

Stray mongrel stabbed to death at the Moscow Metro

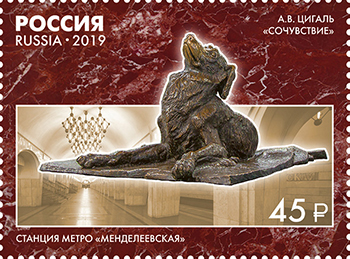
- Compassion monument on a 2019 postage stamp of Russia
- Species: Canis familiaris
- Breed: Mongrel
- Sex: Male
- Born: c. 1996; Moscow, Russia
- Died: December 2001; Moscow, Russia
- Nationality: Russian
- Occupation: Station resident
- Known for: Popular resident at the Mendeleyevskaya station, stabbed to death by a railway commuter
- Appearance: Black

Malchik (Russian: Мальчик, lit. 'Little Boy'; c. 1996 – December 2001) was a black mongrel stray dog living in Moscow, Russia. For about three years, Malchik lived at the Mendeleyevskaya station on the Moscow Metro. In 2001, he was killed when a 22-year-old woman, Yuliana Romanova, stabbed him with a kitchen knife. The incident sparked a wave of public outrage regarding the treatment of animals, and, in 2007, a monument was erected in Malchik's honour at Mendeleyevskaya station. The monument is cited as one of Moscow's most unusual tourist attractions.

== Life at Mendeleyevskaya station ==
Malchik was a short-haired, medium-to-small-sized black mongrel stray dog, who lived at the Mendeleyevskaya station for about three years. He became a popular station "resident" among commuters and railway employers, who often brought him food, and he often defended his territory against drunks and other dogs.

== Death ==
On a winter evening in December 2001, a woman sporting a green camouflage jacket (later identified as Yuliana Romanova (Volkova)) was passing through Mendeleyevskaya station with her pet Staffordshire Bull Terrier. They encountered Malchik in a pedestrian underpass, and the stray dog barked at the pair. One report holds that Romanova set her dog on the sleeping Malchik. Romanova took a kitchen knife from her purse and stabbed Malchik six times in the back, chest and stomach. The dog died several minutes later.

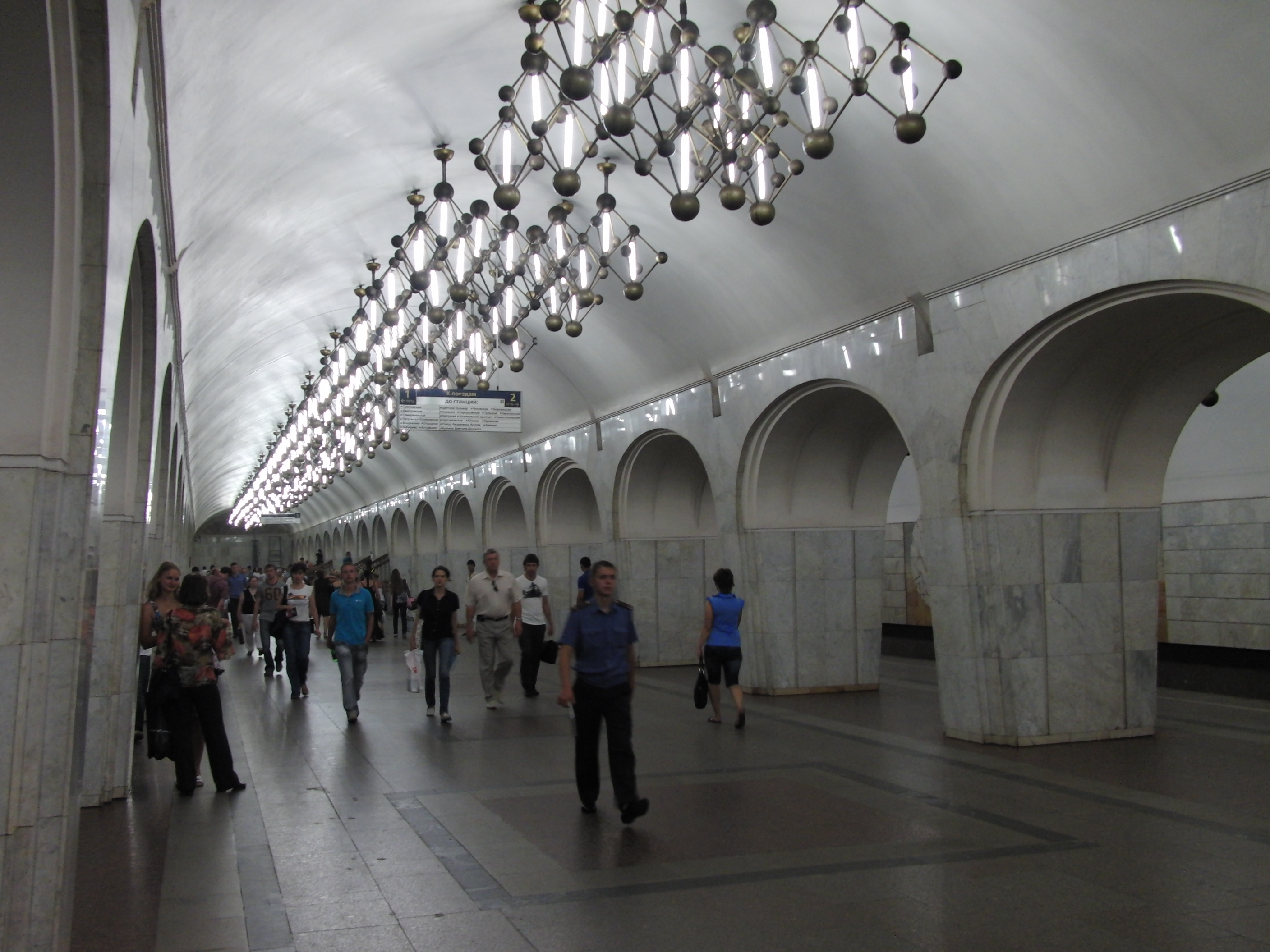
Mendeleyevskaya metro station, where Malchik lived until his death

A shopkeeper from a nearby stall tried to prevent the attack, but Malchik died before the police and an ambulance arrived. The woman was said to have fled the scene and there was no formal investigation initially. However, Romanova was traced back as the killer by Irina Ozyornaya, an activist and investigative reporter of the popular newspaper Izvestiya, who started writing articles about the incident, identifying Romanova as a young fashion model. When contacted by the reporter, Romanova reportedly shrugged off the incident. Later it was revealed that Romanova has a long history of cruelty to animals and psychiatric treatment. After a year of campaigning, however, Romanova was arrested and tried, and underwent one year of psychiatric treatment. The story of Malchik's death received widespread coverage in the Russian media.

== Monument ==
In February 2007, a monument entitled "Compassion" (or "Sympathy"; Russian: Сочувствие, Sochuvstviye) was erected at Mendeleyevskaya station. The monument was funded by public donations. A bronze sculpture of Malchik was placed on a monolithic pedestal of serpentinite at the entrance of Mendeleyevskaya station. It was erected on the night of 15/16 February 2007 and officially unveiled on 17 February. There are two different reasons cited regarding the choice of the date: one is that it was Forgiveness Sunday in the Eastern Orthodox liturgical calendar and hence representing the human race's act of apologizing to Malchik, and another is that it was the last day of the dog in accordance with the Chinese calendar, which is well-known in Russia.

Among the artists responsible for the monument were sculptor Aleksandr Tsigal, artist Sergey Tsigal, architect Andrey Nalich, and designer Peter Nalich. The statue portrays Malchik scratching his ear and turning his head upwards. Citing the reason for such a representation, one of the artists said, "he was a stray, he had fleas, it's right for him to scratch himself." The unveiling ceremony was attended by notable artists, many of whom had donated money for the monument's installation, including Andrey Makarevich, Mikhail Shirvindt, Veniamin Smekhov, Oleg Anofriev, Ludmila Kasatkina and Sergey Yursky. The Russian inscription on the monument reads " 'Compassion' is dedicated to humane relationships with homeless animals." The monument has been cited as one of Moscow's most unusual tourist attractions. As with other monuments in the Moscow metro stations, passersby rub the monument's nose for good luck.

== Legacy ==
Joanna Bednarek wrote that Malchik's story typifies the "peculiar mix of cruelty and sentimentality present in our approach to domesticated animals, particularly dogs." In 2019, the postal department of Russia released a postage stamp portraying the Compassion monument in the memory of Malchik.

== See also ==
- Stray dogs in Moscow
- List of individual dogs
