= Dostoevskaya (Koltsevaya line) =

Moscow metro station in perspective

Dostoevskaya Достоевская

General information
- Coordinates: 55.7802°N 37.6204°E
- System: Moscow Metro station
- Line: Koltsevaya line
- Platforms: 1 island platform
- Tracks: 2

Construction
- Platform levels: 1

History
- Opening: 2030

Services
Preceding station	Moscow Metro	Following station
Novoslobodskaya anticlockwise / outer	Koltsevaya line	Prospekt Mira clockwise / inner
Maryina Roshcha towards Fiztekh	Lyublinsko-Dmitrovskaya line transfer at Dostoevskaya	Trubnaya towards Zyablikovo
Route map
Location
- Location within Central Moscow

Dostoevskaya (Russian: Достоевская) is a station under construction on the Koltsevaya Line of the Moscow Metro. It will be connected to Dostoevskaya on the Lyublinsko-Dmitrovskaya Line. The station was deemed to be not economically feasible and construction was cancelled in 2017. Nevertheless, the station is planned to open in 2030.

== Name ==
It is named after Suvorov Square.

== History ==
Although there was land cleared for the construction of the station, the city elected not to proceed with development of the station. According to Maksim Vasiliev, a manager with MosKomArkhitektura, construction of the station would be too technically complex, too long, and too costly to compete. Consequently, Vasiliev stated that the station was unlikely to be built. On August 19, 2019, works on Suvorovskaya station construction site resumed.
