= Novoslobodskaya =

Moscow Metro station

Novoslobodskaya Новослободская
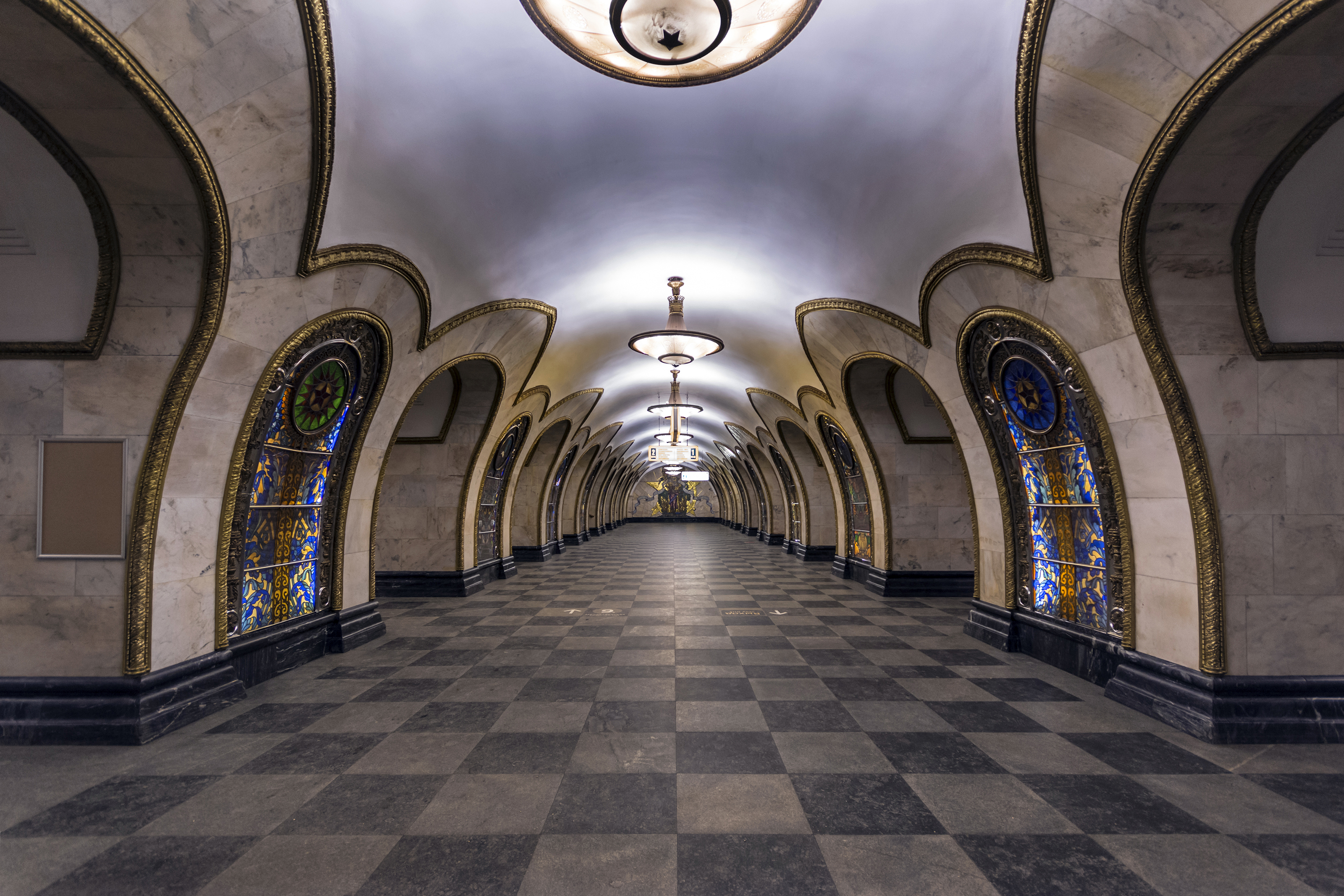

General information
- Location: Novoslobodskaya Street; Tverskoy District; Central Administrative Okrug; Moscow
- Coordinates: 55.7799°N 37.6028°E
- System: Moscow Metro station
- Owner: Moskovsky Metropoliten
- Line: Koltsevaya line
- Platforms: 1 island platform
- Tracks: 2
- Connections: Trolleybus: 3, 15, 47, 69; Tram: 19

Construction
- Structure type: Deep pylon tri-vault
- Depth: 40 metres (130 ft)
- Platform levels: 1
- Parking: No

Other information
- Station code: 068

History
- Opened: 30 January 1952; 74 years ago

Services
Preceding station	Moscow Metro	Following station
Belorusskaya anticlockwise / outer	Koltsevaya line	Suvorovskaya clockwise / inner
Savyolovskaya towards Altufyevo	Serpukhovsko-Timiryazevskaya line transfer at Mendeleyevskaya	Tsvetnoy Bulvar towards Bulvar Dmitriya Donskogo
Route map
Location
- Location within Central Moscow

Novoslobodskaya (Russian: Новослобо́дская) is a Moscow Metro station in the Tverskoy District of the Central Administrative Okrug, Moscow. It is on the Koltsevaya Line, between Belorusskaya and Prospekt Mira stations.

The station was opened on 30 January 1952 as part of the "Kurskaya" — "Belorusskaya" section. The station is the latest work for the metro architect Alexey Dushkin and a designated cultural heritage site. Since 1988, it has had a transition to the station "Mendeleyevskaya" Serpukhovsko-Timiryazevskaya line, becoming the last station of the Koltsevaya Line to receive a transfer.

Between November 2020 and March 2022, Novoslobodskaya was closed for reconstruction.

== History ==
The Koltsevaya Line was not included in the original plans of the Moscow Metro, instead planning to build additional "diametrical" lines that would pass through Novoslobodskaya. The first design of the Koltsevaya Line appeared in 1934, then the line's construction, along with 17 line stations, was planned as a part of the Garden Ring project. A new perspective scheme of the Moscow Metro was mentioned in the 39th volume of the Great Soviet Encyclopedia in an article dated back to the middle of 1938, where the planned Koltsevaya Line was placed much further from the center than it would be built later. The planned stations were "Usachevskaya", "Kaluzhskaya Zastava", "Serpukhovskaya Zastava", "Stalin Plant", "Ostapovo", "Hammer and Sickle Factory", "Lefortovo", "Spartak", "Krasnoselskaya", "Rzhevsky Railway Station", "Savelovsky Railway Station", "Dynamo", "Krasnopresnenskaya Zastava", "Kievskaya".

In 1941, the design of the Koltsevaya Line was shifted closer to the center, and in 1943, it was decided to build a line along the current Koltsevaya Line in order to unload the transfer hub "Okhotny Ryad" — "Sverdlov Square" — "Ploshchad Revolyutsii". In 1947, the line was set to be completed in four sections: "Central Park of Culture and Recreation" — "Kurskaya", "Kurskaya" — "Komsomolskaya", "Komsomolskaya" — "Belorusskaya" (would-be merged with the second section), and "Belorusskaya" — "Central Park of Culture and Recreation". The first section, "Park Kultury" — "Kurskaya", was opened on January 1, 1950. The second section, "Kurskaya" — "Belorusskaya", on opened on 30 January 1952. The third, "Belorusskaya" — "Park of Culture", which closes the line in the ring, was opened on March 14, 1954. During the construction of the distillation tunnel between Novoslobodskaya and "Botanic Garden", a record was set for laying out 150 meters of tunnel in a month.

Novoslobodskaya gets its name from the nearby street of the same name. The station's design was a result of the collaboration between the corresponding member of the USSR Academy of Architecture Alexey Dushkin, who already had experience in the construction of Moscow metro stations and was awarded two Stalin Prizes for this work, and architect Alexander Strelkov. After the choice of the architects was approved, Strelkov worked on the project for the next two months, while Dushkin supervised it. Dushkin suggested making the lobby round, while Strelkov insisted on making it rectangular or square. The city Planning Council rejected the round lobby option and approved Strelkov's project, which was implemented.

In 1988, the transfer passage to the Mendeleyevskaya station of the Serpukhovsko-Timiryazevskaya line was opened. Until then, it remained the last station on the Koltsevaya Line without cross-platform transfer.

In 2003, starting in February and until May, the stained glass windows, chandeliers and end panels were restored. The lighting became brighter, which significantly changed the original idea of the architects who sought to create the grotto-style station with subdued, soft lighting. Between 21 November 2020 and 4 March 2022, the station lobby was closed to replace escalators and repair cash registers. During the reconstruction, the entrance and exit were carried out only through the Mendeleyevskaya station. The number of escalators has been increased from three to four, and the lobby has been restored to its historical appearance.

== Architecture and art ==
=== Lobby ===
Novoslobodskaya metro station has one above-ground lobby located on Novoslobodskaya Street. It is a massive three-storey structure resembling an ancient temple. In particular, marked by simple proportions, a deep six-column portico, and square and round columns in front of the facade. The outermost columns are square, the rest are round. All columns are fluted, slightly tapering upwards, with small ionic capitals. The station's above-ground lobby is a designated cultural heritage site.

Behind the entrance there is a rectangular ante-room with cash registers. There are four doors leading into the lobby: three from Novoslobodskaya Street and one from Seleznevskaya Street. The entrance hall is separated from the arched corridor colonnade of round columns, which are smaller copies of the outside columns. At the opposite ends of the arched corridor are wide and deep arches for the entrance and exit into the escalator hall. There are decorative columns on the inner wall of the corridor between the arches opposite the colonnade.

The escalator hall is a tent room with a semicircular aisle, which houses the upper end of the escalator tunnel. The white dome of the hall is crossed by frequent narrow low nervures. At the top of the dome there is a stucco Rosette with a star, and along the dome drum there is a wide frieze with a ceremonial ornament.

=== Station halls ===
The authors of the project are Alexey Dushkin and Alexander Strelkov.

The station is built in the pylon style marked by three deep—laid arches. The diameter of the central hall is 9.5 meters. Comparatively narrow pylons expand upward, smoothly turning into arches. The wide aisles between the pylons are vaulted and longer at the top than at the bottom. The curves of the arches shift from the central and side halls are bordered by relief stucco gilded ornamental stripes. The pylons are lined with light, grayish and yellowish tones and inclusions of dark Ural marble from the Karkodinsky deposit. The general idea for the architectural structure was conceived by Mikhail Zelenin who proposed it during the construction of Dobryninskaya metro station.

The most notable element of the station's design are 32 pieces of spectacularly illuminated stained glass. The glass is integrated into the pylons in pairs and coated with steel and gilded brass. These pairs face the hall with a multi-colored glass that forms the likenesses of flowers, plants, and stars. Inside the stained glass windows, in the upper part, small medallions are inserted, which depict genre scenes of an ideal peaceful life. Six of them depict people of profession: architect, geographer, artist, power engineer, musician, and agronomist. The rest depict geometric patterns and five-pointed stars. Additionally, they installed lamps behind the glass.

Dushkin had the idea to use glass in a design of the metro station long before the construction of Novoslobodskaya and before the outbreak of the Great Patriotic War. He suggested making stained glass windows from uranium glass. Both architects wanted to make the stained glass windows in relief, and also to have them made by sculpture Vera Mukhina. However, in the provision of uranium glass Gosplan refused, and the architects turned to P. D. Corin with the idea of a stained glass window. The windows are based from the sketches of Pavel Korin, turned into stained glass in Riga by the Latvian branch of the USSR Art Foundation. The stained glass windows themselves were made by Latvian artists, as there was no tradition of such window decoration in Russia. In the process, they used glass stored in the Riga Cathedral and intended for the needs of the church.

At the end of the central hall there is a large, full-wall smalt panel created by Korin: spelling "World Peace" (Russian: "Мир во всём мире"), and depicting a happy mother with a child in her arms. The woman was found to resemble Tamara Dushkina, the wife of the station's architect . During Nikita Khrushchev administration a medallion with the image of Joseph Stalin was removed. The artist had to rework the mosaic, and instead of Stalin's image, soaring white doves were painted. All this is depicted against the background of a golden halo, a star and diverging rays.

The floor is lined with grey and black granite slabs arranged in a checkerboard pattern. In addition to the stained glass windows, the station is illuminated by hanging chandelier plates.

== Cross-platform transfer ==
From this station it is possible to transfer to Mendeleyevskaya station on the Serpukhovsko-Timiryazevskaya Line. The transition begins from the stairs to the bridge over the platform in the direction of Belorusskaya. Next there is a transfer chamber and a short escalator down. From a long, wide vaulted corridor, there are four vaulted passages that lead to bridges and stairs above the platform in the direction of Bulvar Dmitriya Donskogo station.

== Gallery ==
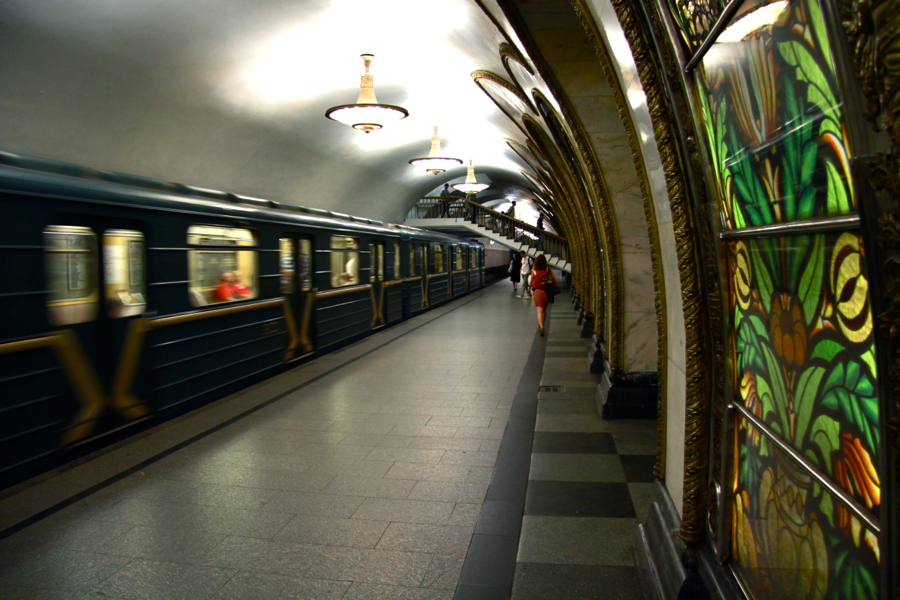

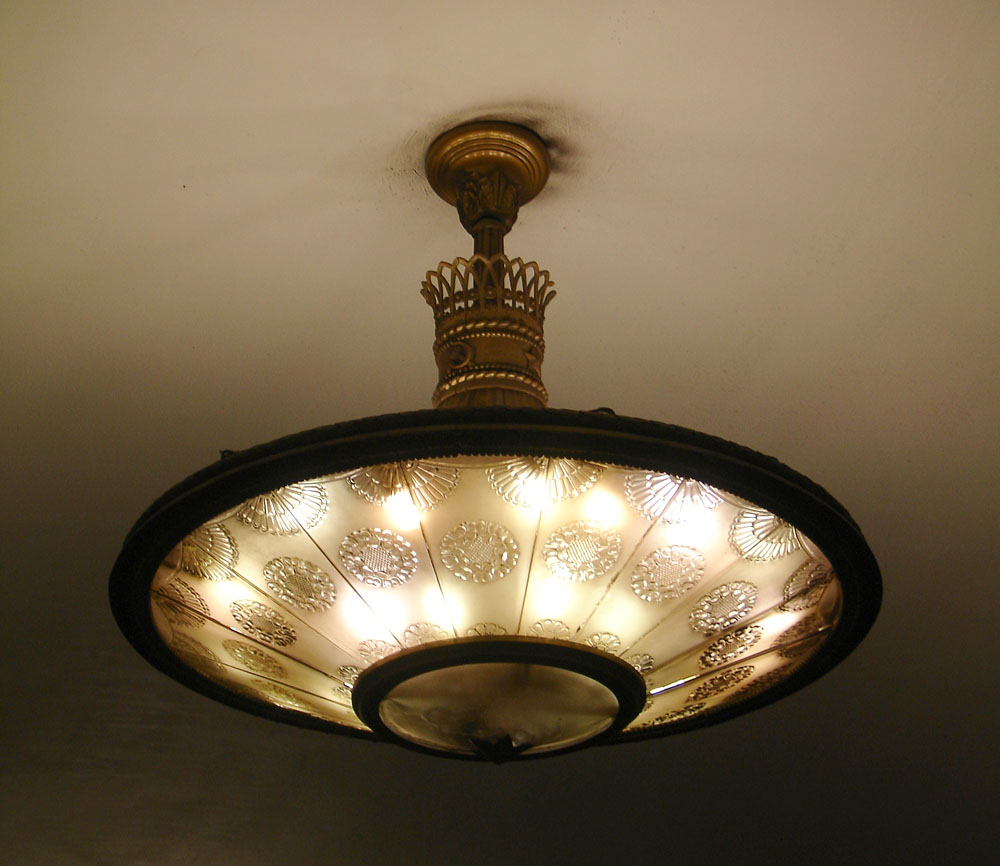

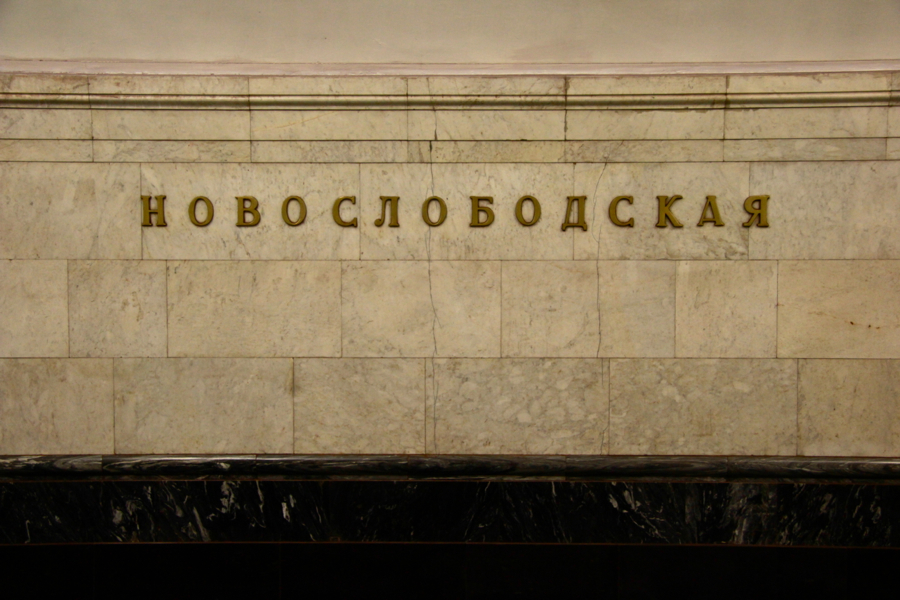

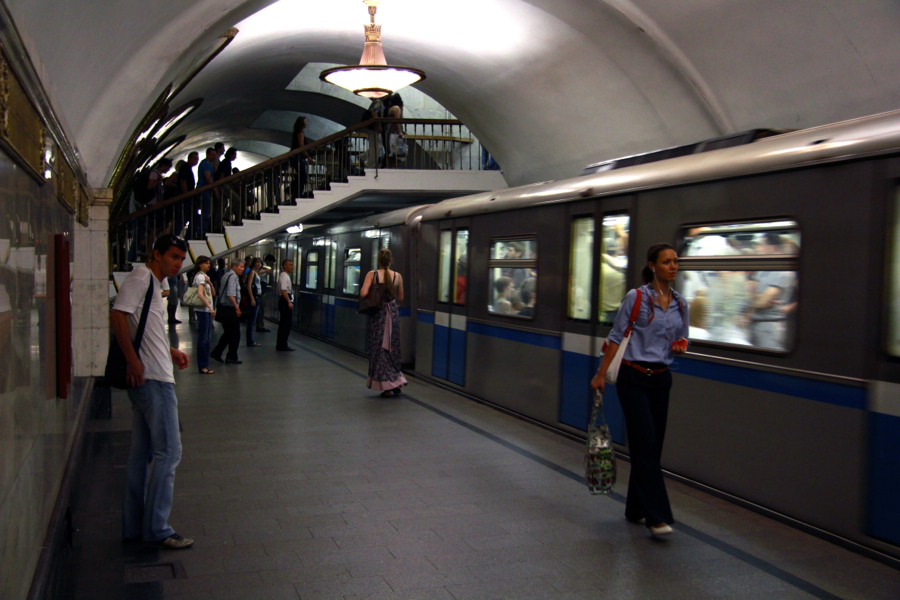
Rusich train on the platform. Note the upper pass is the transfer walkway to the Mendeleyevskaya on the Serpukhovsko-Timiryazevskaya Line

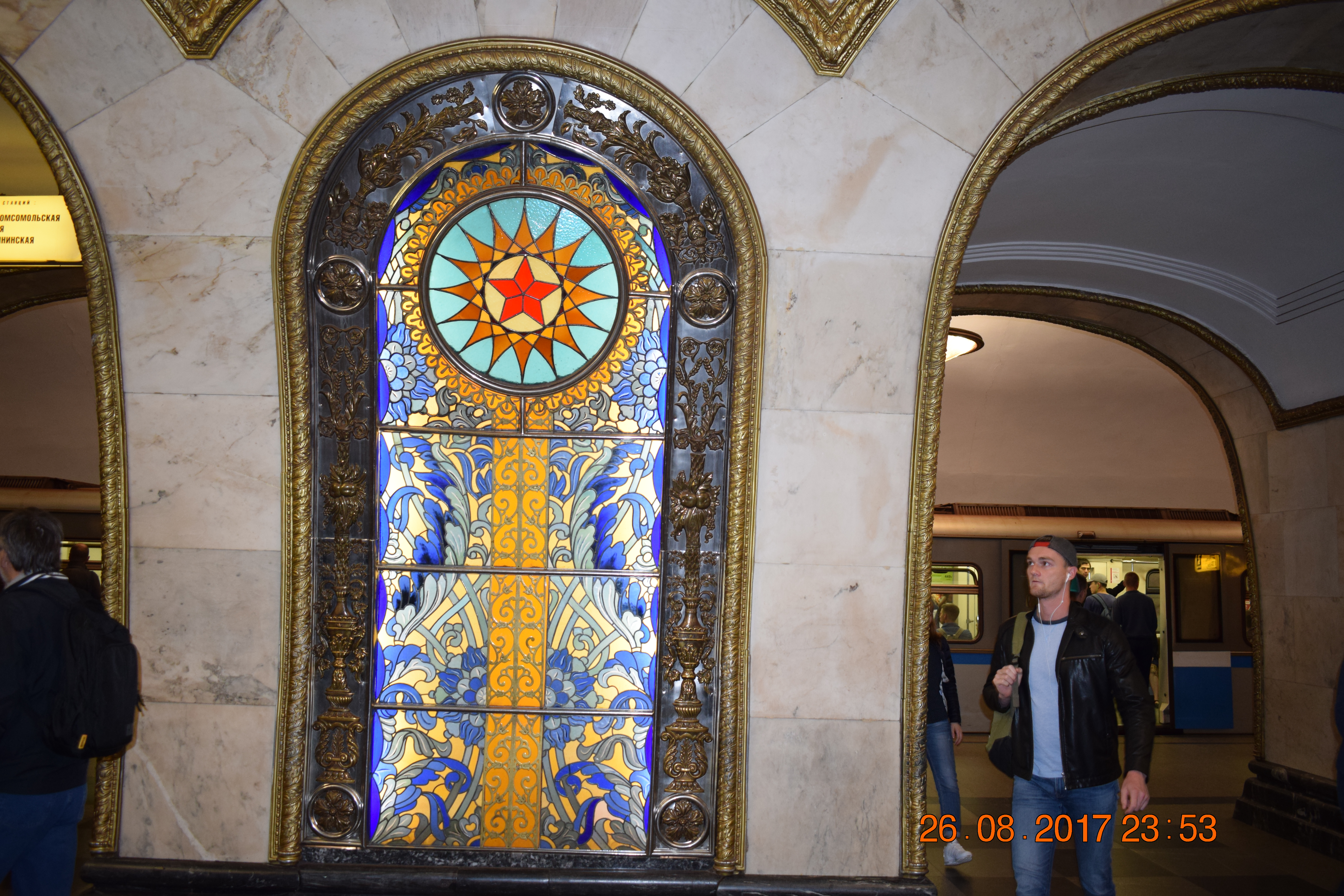
One of the decorative glass panels

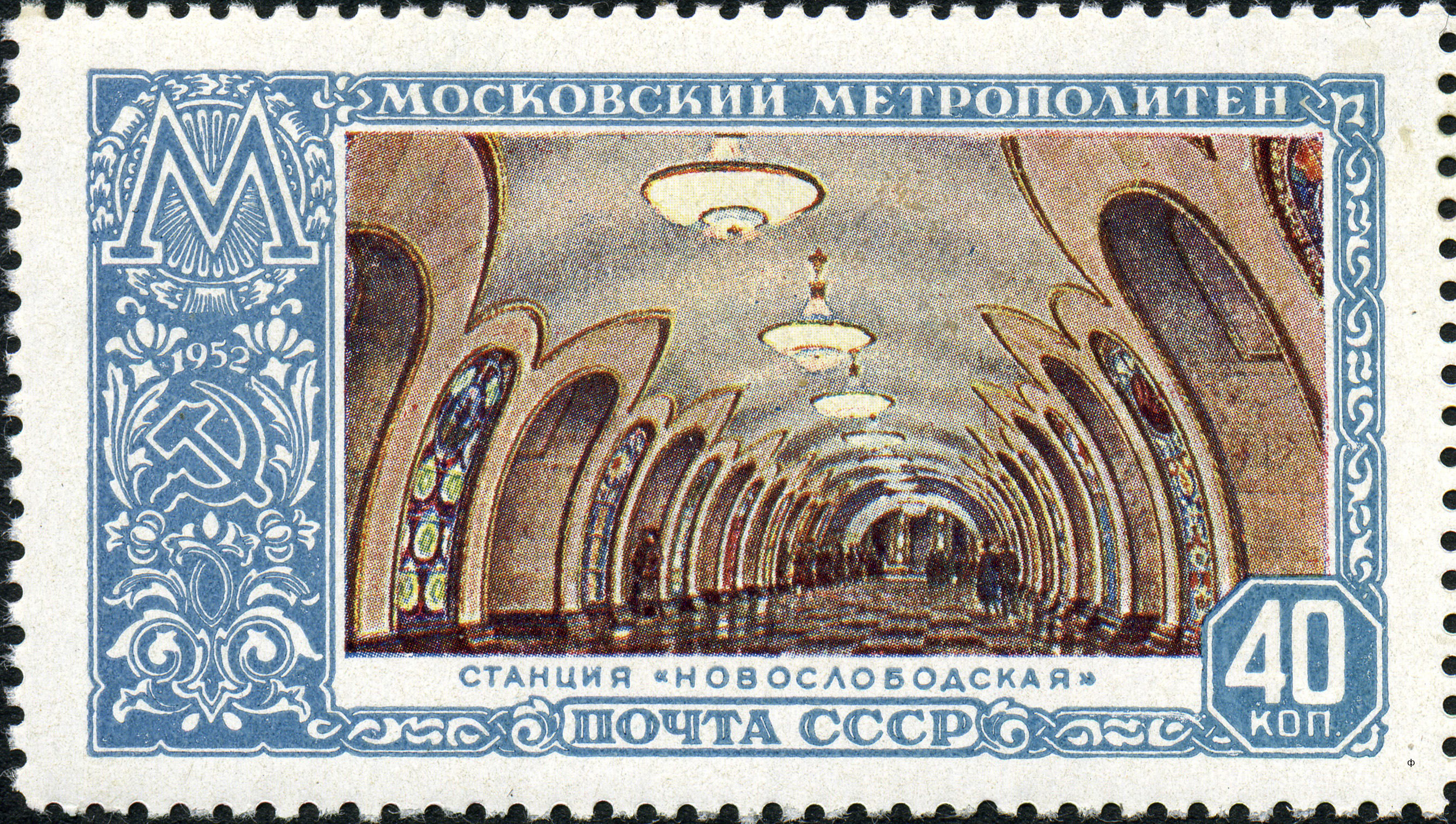
The station featured on a 1952 stamp
