= Dostoevskaya (Moscow Metro) =

Moscow Metro station

Dostoevskaya Достоевская
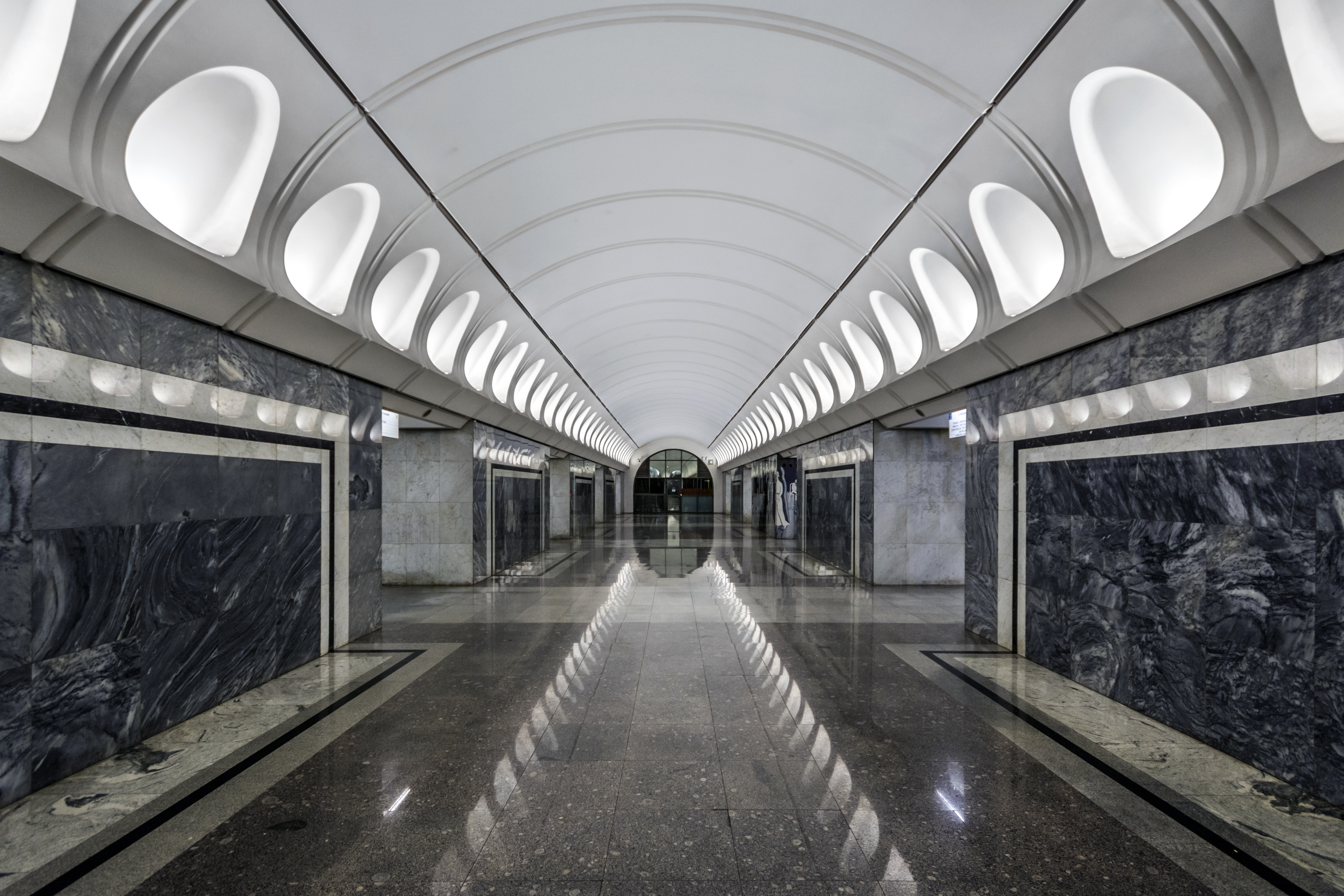

General information
- Location: Meshchansky District; Central Administrative Okrug; Moscow; Russia
- Coordinates: 55.7816°N 37.6151°E
- System: Moscow Metro station
- Owner: Moskovsky Metropoliten
- Line: Lyublinsko-Dmitrovskaya line
- Platforms: 1 island platform
- Tracks: 2
- Connections: Trolleybus: 13, 15, 31, 69

Construction
- Structure type: Deep column-wall station
- Depth: 60 metres (200 ft)
- Platform levels: 1
- Parking: No

Other information
- Station code: 181

History
- Opened: 19 June 2010; 16 years ago

Services
Preceding station	Moscow Metro	Following station
Maryina Roshcha towards Fiztekh	Lyublinsko-Dmitrovskaya line	Trubnaya towards Zyablikovo
Novoslobodskaya anticlockwise / outer	Koltsevaya line transfer at Dostoevskaya	Prospekt Mira clockwise / inner
Route map
Location
- Location within Central Moscow

Dostoevskaya (Russian: Достоевская) is a Moscow Metro station in the Meshchansky District, Central Administrative Okrug, Moscow. It is on the Lyublinsko-Dmitrovskaya line, between Maryina Roshcha and Trubnaya stations.

Dostoevskaya opened on 19 June 2010 as a part of the northern line extension along with Maryina Roshcha station.

The station has two exits. One is near the building of the Russian Army Theatre, the other leads to Suvorovskaya Square.

== Construction ==
The construction of the station started in the 1990s although construction was shelved for several years insufficient funding. The construction process resumed only in 2007 when funds were allocated and both the right and left rail tunnels were built. The construction of the platform began afterwards. In April 2009, the lack of funds forced the Moscow Metro authorities to delay the station's opening to May 2010. Several days before the supposed opening date, it was delayed again to June for adjustments to the escalators.

== Interchange ==
The Metro planned to build Dostoevskaya station, which would allow transfers to the northern end of the Koltsevaya Line. In 2017, the Metro shelved plans for the station citing economic infeasibility.

== Controversy ==
Published photos of station's decor elements caused disputes within the Russian Internet community. There are several scenes of violence (homicide and suicide) depicted on the station walls as illustrations of Fyodor Dostoevsky's novels Crime and Punishment, The Idiot, and Demons.
