= Ulitsa 1905 Goda =

Moscow Metro station

Ulitsa 1905 Goda Улица 1905 года
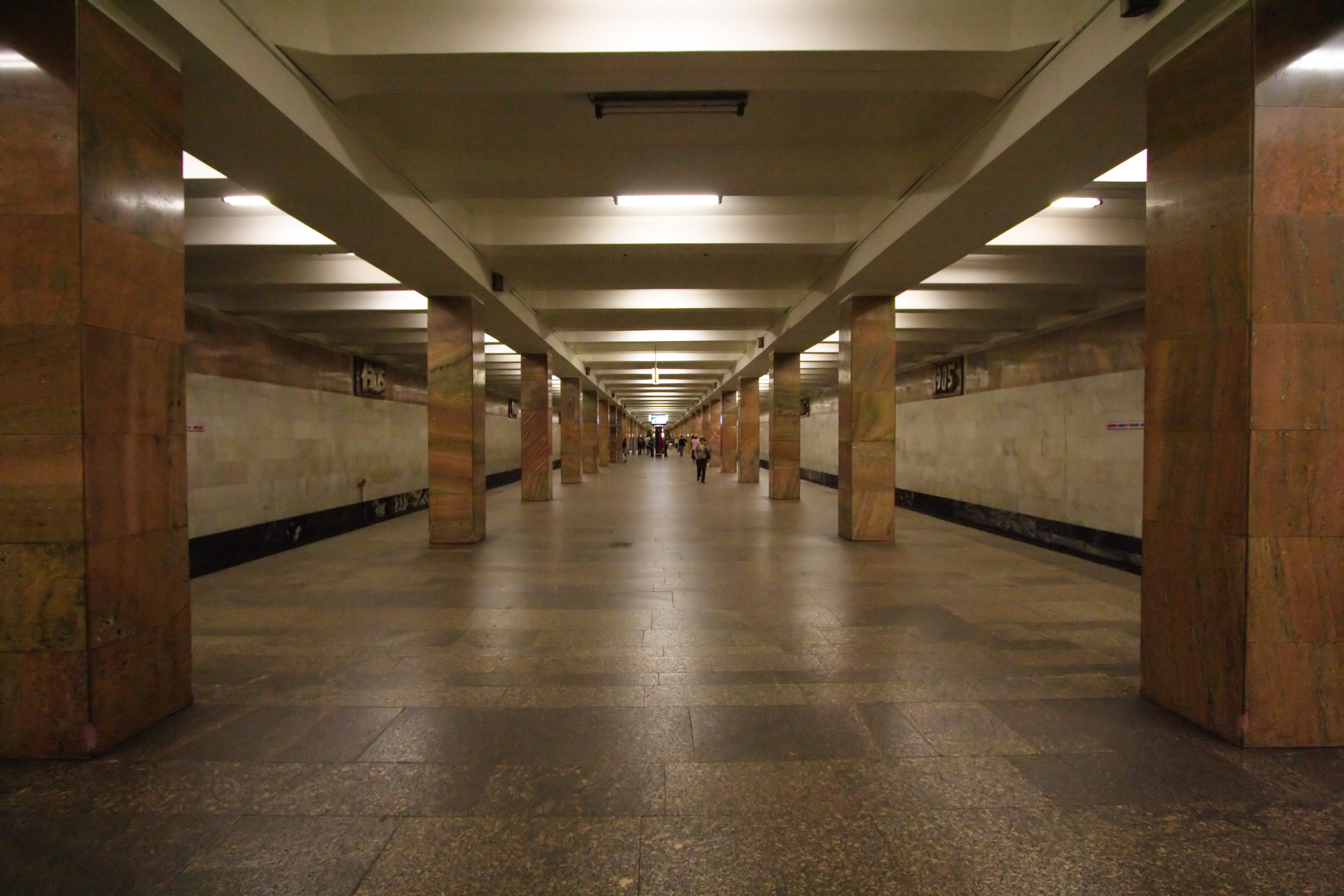

General information
- Location: Presnensky District; Central Administrative Okrug; Moscow; Russia
- Coordinates: 55.7650°N 37.5613°E
- System: Moscow Metro station
- Owner: Moskovsky Metropoliten
- Line: Tagansko-Krasnopresnenskaya line
- Platforms: 1 island platform
- Tracks: 2
- Connections: Bus: 6, 12, 39, 64, 69, 152

Construction
- Structure type: shallow
- Depth: 11 m (36 ft)
- Platform levels: 1
- Parking: No

Other information
- Station code: 121

History
- Opened: 30 December 1972; 53 years ago

Services
Preceding station	Moscow Metro	Following station
Begovaya towards Planernaya	Tagansko-Krasnopresnenskaya line	Barrikadnaya towards Kotelniki
Route map
Location
- Location within Moscow Metro

Ulitsa 1905 Goda (Russian: Улица 1905 года, romanized: Ulitsa tysyacha devyat'sot pyatogo goda) is a Moscow Metro station in the Presnensky District, Central Administrative Okrug, Moscow, Russia. It is on the Tagansko-Krasnopresnenskaya Line, between Begovaya and Barrikadnaya stations. The station was opened on 30 December 1972, as part of the Krasnopresnenskiy radius.

== Name ==
It is named after the nearby street, which in turn is named to commemorate the Revolution of 1905.

== Building ==
The station is considered to be the first in Moscow of the modified column tri-span "Sorokonozhka" design which signified that the era where functionality dominated metro architecture had ceased. The number of pillars was lowered from 40 to 26, and the interpillar distance increased from 4 to 6.5 metres. The architect, Robert Pogrebnoi, applied a decoration of pink marble to the pillars of varying shades. The walls were also decorated with marble instead of ceramic tiles for the first time. The grey marble shade is punctuated with frisian and metallic artworks showing the numbers 1905 and torches (works of Yury Korolev). Grey granite covers the floor.

The western vestibule is underground with an exit to Year 1905 street, whilst the eastern vestibule is a surface rotunda building (very unusual for a shallow station) and is situated in the middle of Krasnopresnenskaya Zastava square. It is decorated inside with a frisian mosaic of the events of 1905.

The station carries a total of 74410 people daily.

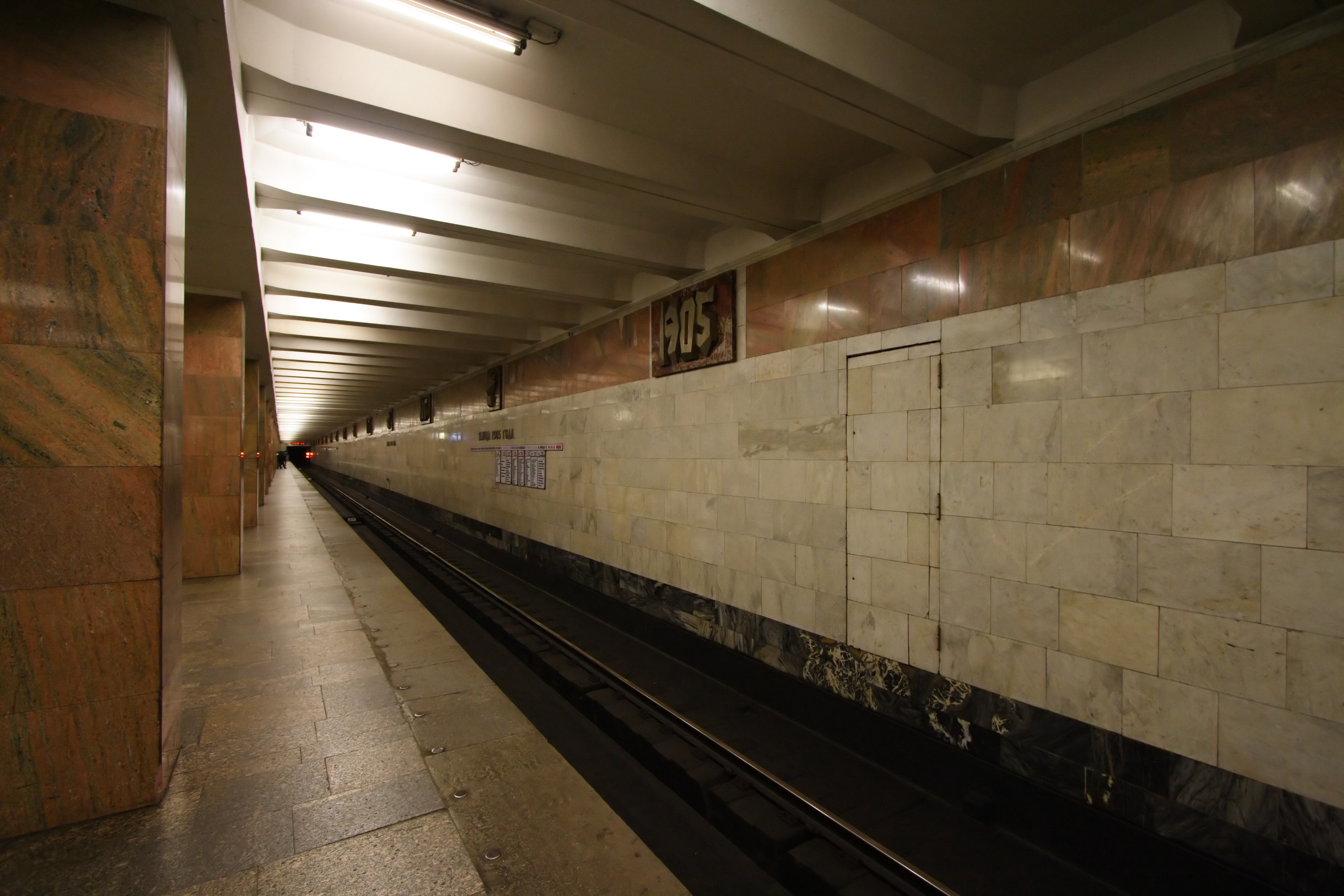
Station platform
