= Begovaya (Moscow Metro) =

Moscow Metro station

Begovaya Беговая
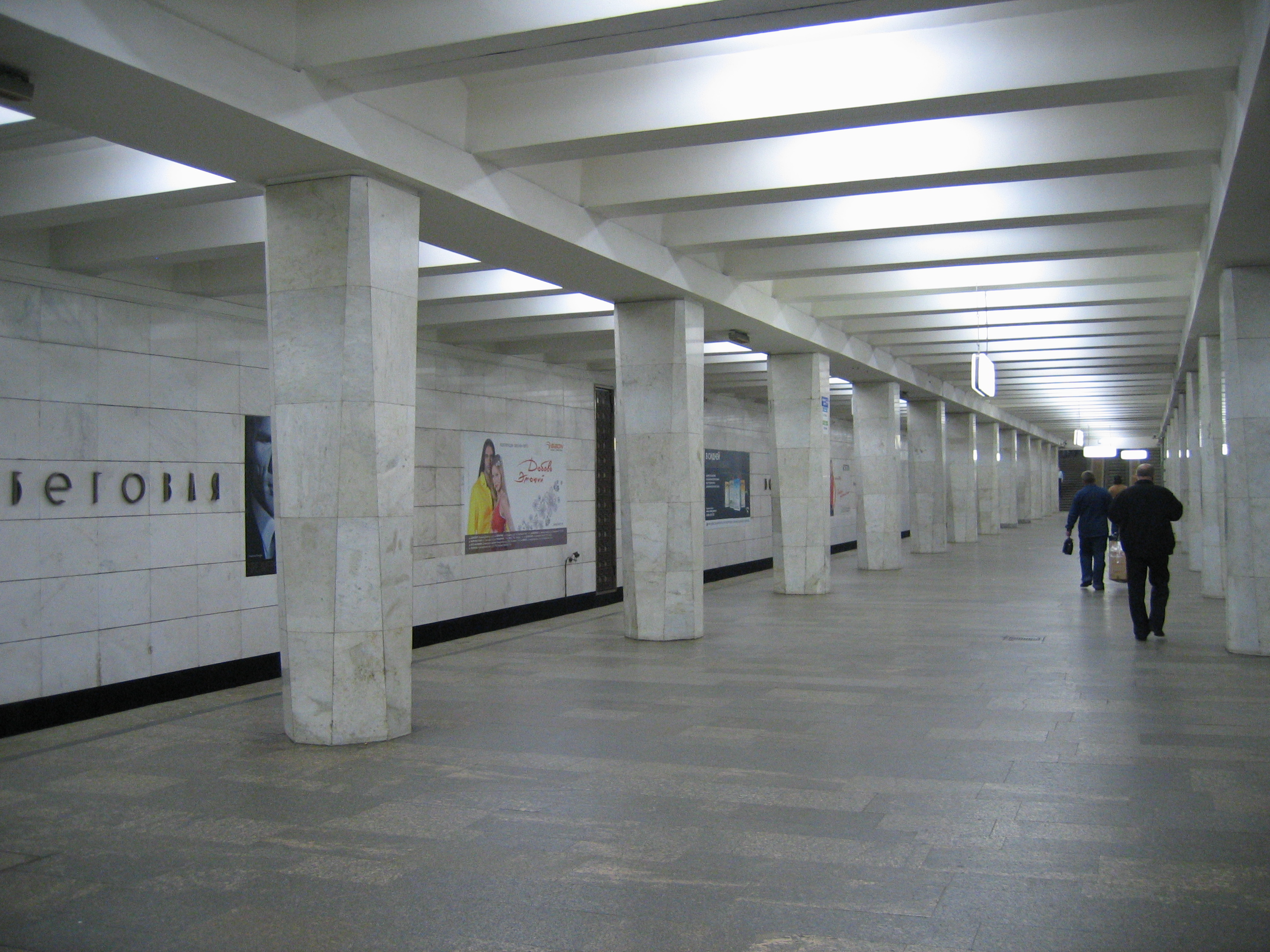

General information
- Location: Khoroshyovsky District; Northern Administrative Okrug; Moscow; Russia
- Coordinates: 55.7738°N 37.5468°E
- System: Moscow Metro station
- Owner: Moskovsky Metropoliten
- Line: Tagansko-Krasnopresnenskaya line
- Platforms: 1 island platform
- Tracks: 2
- Connections: Bus: 6, 27, 39, 64; Trolleybus: 20, 35, 65, 86

Construction
- Depth: 9 metres (30 ft)
- Platform levels: 1
- Parking: No

Other information
- Station code: 122

History
- Opened: 30 December 1972; 53 years ago

Services
Preceding station	Moscow Metro	Following station
Polezhayevskaya towards Planernaya	Tagansko-Krasnopresnenskaya line	Ulitsa 1905 Goda towards Kotelniki
Route map
Location
- Location within Moscow Metro

Begovaya (Russian: Бегова́я) is a station on the Tagansko-Krasnopresnenskaya Line of the Moscow Metro.

It is named after the nearby Central Moscow Hippodrome, the station was opened on 30 December 1972, as part of the Krasnopresnensky radius. Originally the architect V. Cheremin intended to use the typical column tri-span "Novaya Sorokonozhka", but produced a design of pillars starting as a square at the top and octagonally transforming into a square that is at 45 degrees to the top layout. The floor was covered in dark coloured granite and the walls with ceramic tiles, with metallic artworks on the theme of equestrian sports. The station was the first to have repair work done on its walls when the ceramic tiles were replaced by white marble. The vestibules feature a combined escalator/staircase and the top portal is decorated with artwork called "The Mighty Horsemen", all of which along with the wall artworks were created by the artist E. Ladygin. The vestibules are situated next to a junction between 1905 street, the Third Ring Road (originally called Begovaya, hence the name), the Khoroshovo Highway and Rozanova Street. In the tunnel between the Ulitsa 1905 Goda and Begovaya stations there is an access branch that leads into the Krasnaya Presnya depot, which used to serve the Krasnopresnenskaya Line from 1972 until 1975 when the Planernoye depot opened.

53,550 commuters use the station daily.

Video of the driver's view, traveling through the station

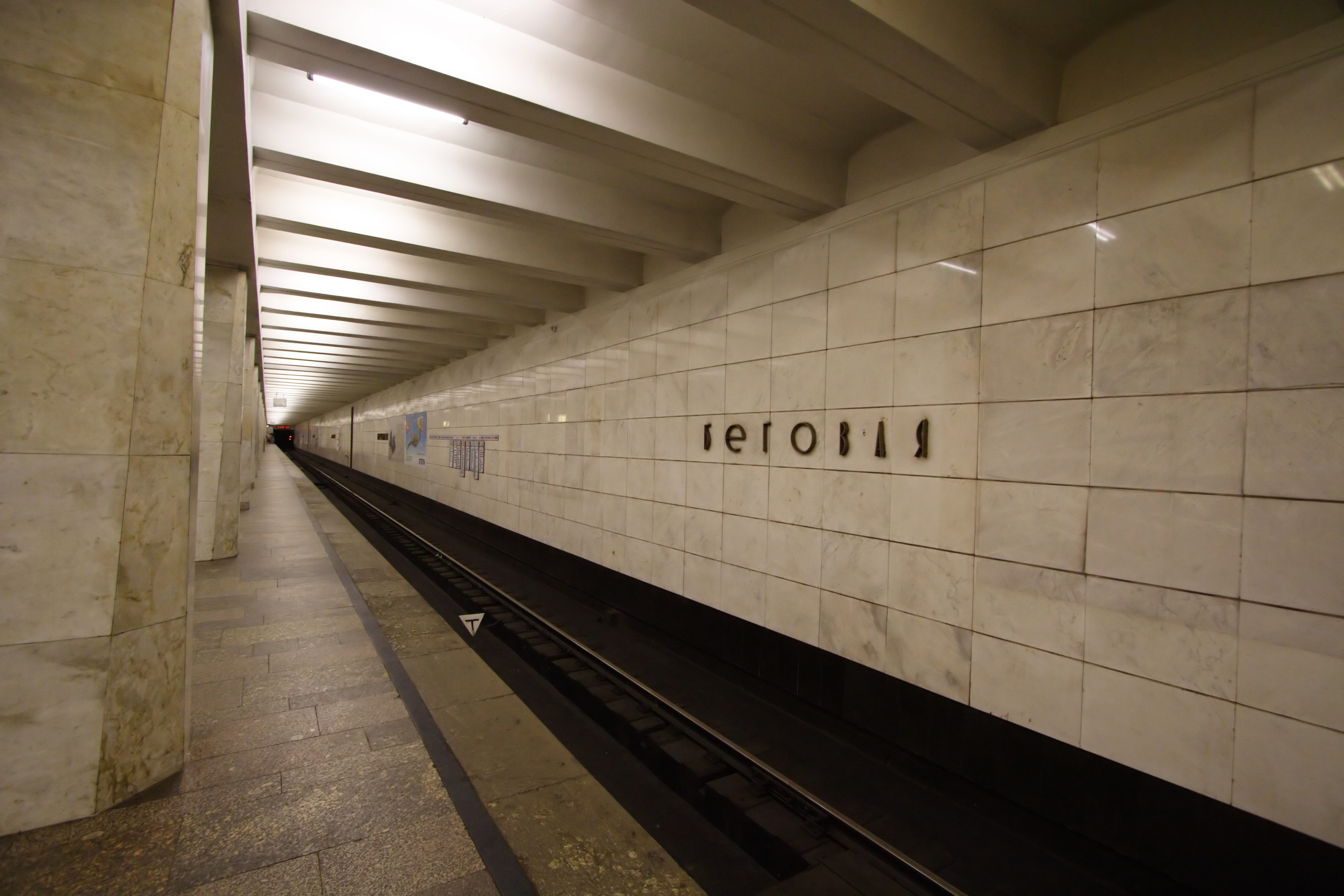
Begovaya platform
