= Tsvetnoy Boulevard =

Coordinates: 55°46′14″N 37°37′18″E

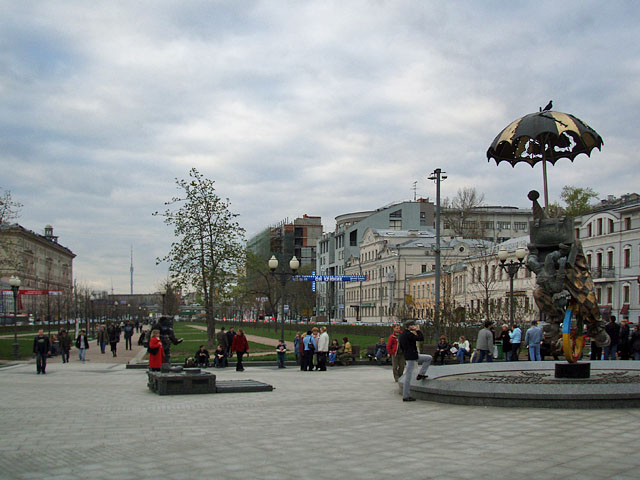
Tsvetnoy Boulevard

Tsvetnoy Boulevard (Russian: Цветной бульвар), called Trubny Boulevard before 1851, is a boulevard in the Meschansky District, central Moscow, Russia. Not a part of the Boulevard Ring, the street runs north/south from Petrovsky Boulevard and Rozhdestvensky Boulevard in the south to the Garden Ring in the north.

The boulevard was laid out in the 1830s to replace the riverbed of the Neglinnaya after this rivulet and the adjacent large pond had been earthed up. Its name is derived from the Russian word for "colorful", alluding to the nearby flower market. The street gives its name to a Moscow metro station, Tsvetnoy Bulvar.

The most notable landmarks are the Nikulin Moscow Circus on Tsvetnoy Boulevard, the new Tsvetnoy Central Market department store and a lofty column supporting the statue of Saint George slaying the dragon (i.e., coat of arms of Moscow).
