= Moscow Circus on Tsvetnoy Boulevard =

Coordinates: 55°46′14″N 37°37′11″E

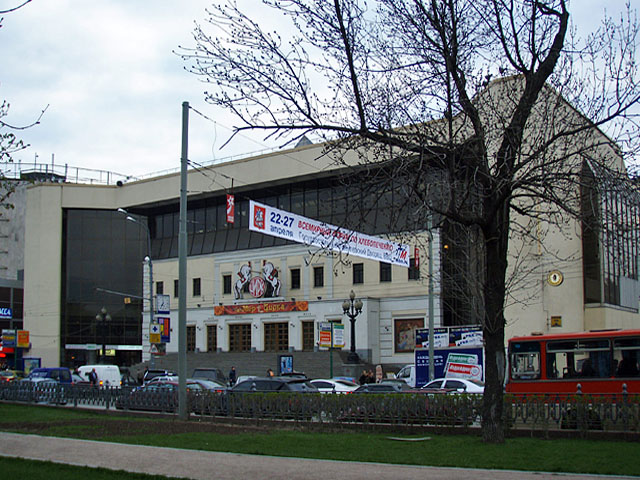
Moscow Circus on Tsvetnoi Boulevard

Moscow Circus on Tsvetnoi Boulevard, or Nikulin's Circus, is located on Tsvetnoi Boulevard in the Tverskoy District of central Moscow. It was the only circus in the city between 1926 and 1971.

== History ==
=== Salamonsky Circus ===
The circus was established by Albert Salamonsky descended from a family of Jewish circus riders. He constructed the circus building in Moscow on a place where usually travelling shows and vagarious artists performed at fairs. The very first performance was on October 12, 1880. Salamonsky was an innovative entrepreneur — he included non-circus artists like singers, choruses, folk ensembles, he staged shows with 35 riders in the ring and organized first Christmas shows for kids. Salamonsky also strived to make circus art be more accessible; he introduced cheaper rows and standees.

Upon his death in 1913, the popularity of the circus decreased.

=== Soviet Circus ===
After the Russian revolution, in 1919 the circus was nationalized by the Soviet Government. The Bolsheviks saw the circus art as a very important tool of mass propaganda and tried to ‘revolutionize’ the repertoire. Only in the 1930s did the artists manage to separate the shows from propaganda. In 1945 Nikolay Baikalov was assigned to the director's post; his epoch in the Tsvetnoy became one of the most important parts of the circus's history.

The troupe was awarded the Order of Lenin in 1939.

Since the middle of the 20th century, the Soviet circus was well known around the world for its professionalism. In the USSR all circuses were subordinate to the SoyuzGosTsirk (Soviet State Circus) Department, and all the artists were officially hired as its employees.

Among the famous performers who worked there were clowns Karandash, Oleg Popov, Leonid Yengibarov and Yuri Nikulin, illusionist Emil Kio, performer Margarita Nazarova, the Durovs, Yuri Kuklachyov, etc.

=== Nikulin's Circus ===
Yuri Nikulin, one of the most popular clowns in Russia and successful cinema actor, worked for the Tsvetnoy circus for 33 years. In 1981 he retired from performing and was assigned to the director's post. Nikulin managed the circus for fifteen years. During his office the company managed to survive through the crisis in the 1990s, when the country faced a political and economical collapse. He 'cleaned' the repertoire from Soviet propaganda heritage and welcomed the spirit of new age into the shows.

== See also ==
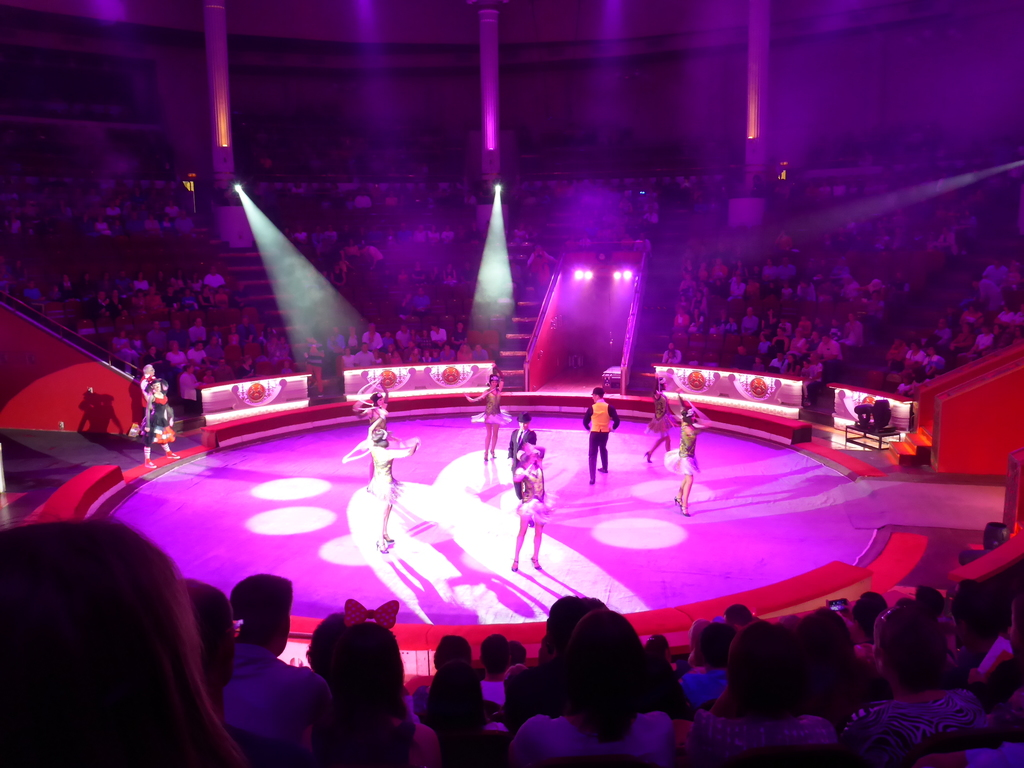
Show in summer 2016

- Bolshoi Circus on Vernadsky Prospekt
- Ciniselli Circus in Saint Petersburg

== Literature ==
- Stites, Richard (1992). Russian Popular Culture: Entertainment and Society Since 1900. Cambridge: Cambridge University Press. pp. 182–183. ISBN 0-521-36986-X.
