= Krasnopresnenskaya =

Moscow Metro station

Krasnopresnenskaya Краснопресненская
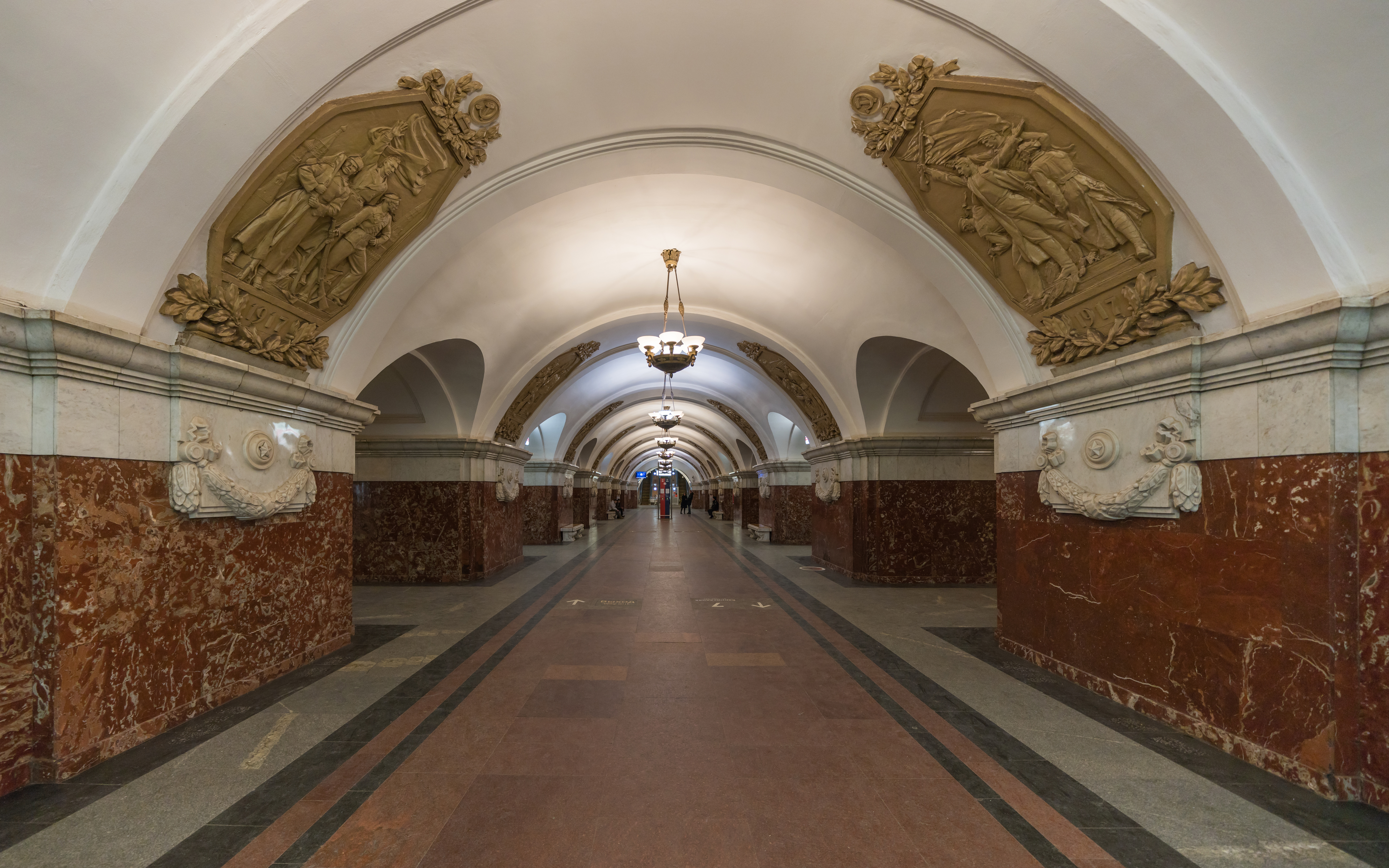

General information
- Location: Krasnaya Presnya Street; Presnensky District; Central Administrative Okrug; Moscow
- Coordinates: 55.7613°N 37.5774°E
- System: Moscow Metro station
- Owner: Moskovsky Metropoliten
- Line: Koltsevaya line
- Platforms: 1
- Tracks: 2
- Connections: Bus: 4, 6, 39, 64, 69, 116, 152; Trolleybus: 35, 79, 95

Construction
- Structure type: Deep pylon tri-span
- Depth: 35.5 metres (116 ft)
- Platform levels: 1
- Parking: No

Other information
- Station code: 078

History
- Opened: 14 March 1954; 72 years ago

Services
Preceding station	Moscow Metro	Following station
Kiyevskaya anticlockwise / outer	Koltsevaya line	Belorusskaya clockwise / inner
Ulitsa 1905 Goda towards Planernaya	Tagansko-Krasnopresnenskaya line transfer at Barrikadnaya	Pushkinskaya towards Kotelniki
Route map
Location
- Location within Central Moscow

Krasnopresnenskaya (Russian: Краснопре́сненская, lit. 'Red Presnya') is a Moscow Metro station in the Presnensky District, Central Administrative Okrug, Moscow. It is on the Koltsevaya line, between Kiyevskaya and Belorusskaya stations. It was named for the street, Krasnaya Presnya, on which it is situated. Passengers may transfer to Barrikadnaya station on the Tagansko–Krasnopresnenskaya line.

== Design and layout ==
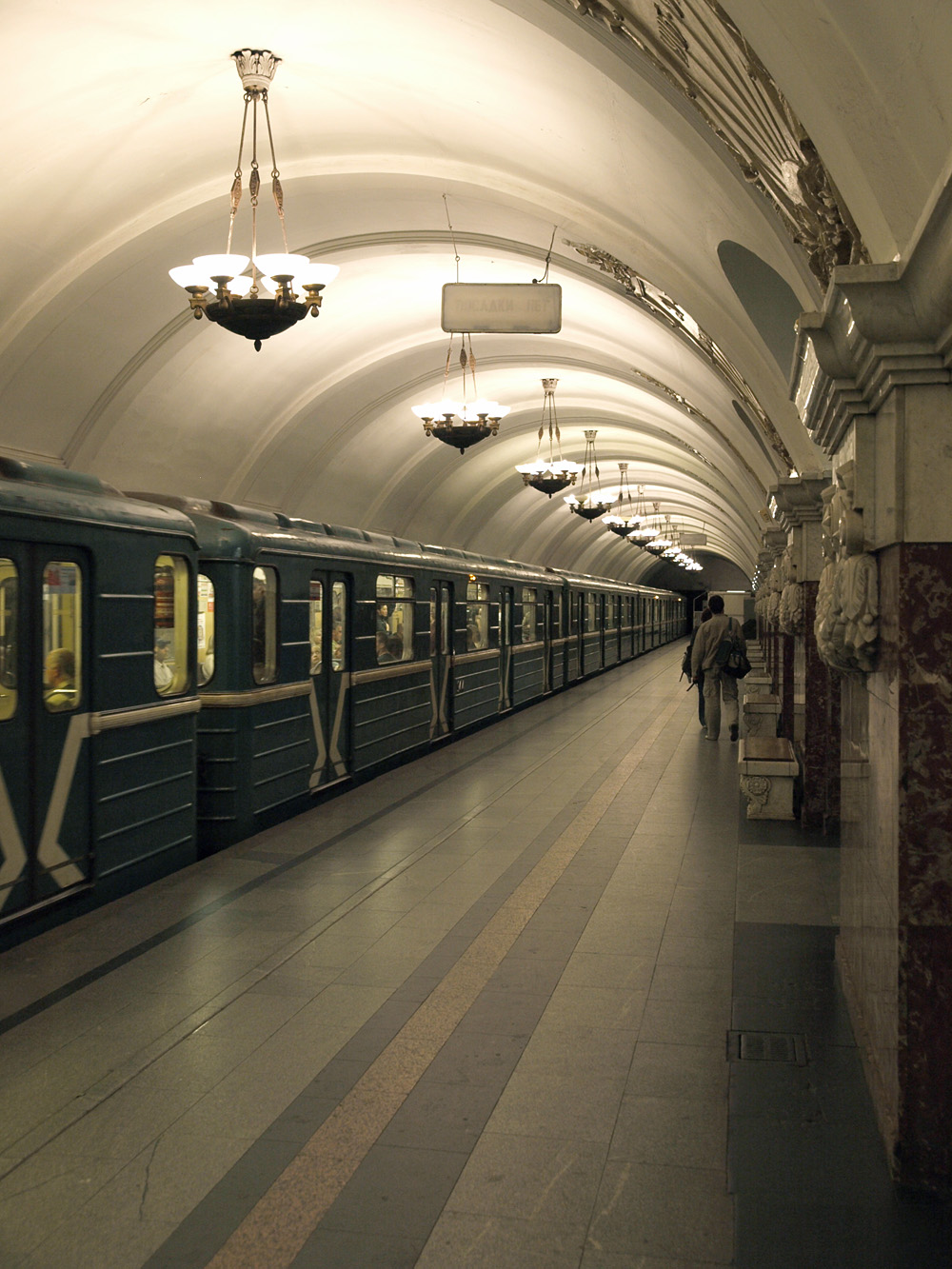
Platform of Krasnopresnenskaya

It was designed by Victor Yegerev, M. Konstantinov, Felix Novikov, and I. Pokrovsky and opened on 14 March 1954. The station has red granite pylons with white marble cornices and 14 bas-reliefs by N. Shcherbakov, Yu. Pommer, Yu. Ushakov, V. Fedorov, and G. Kolesnikov. As the Presnya area of Moscow was the site of the Moscow Uprising of 1905 during the 1905 Russian Revolution, the station is decorated with artwork commemorating the events of the period. Eight of the bas-reliefs depict the events of the Russian Revolution of 1905 and the other six show scenes from the Russian Revolution of 1917. Statues of Vladimir Lenin and Joseph Stalin originally stood at the end of the platform, though these had been removed by the early 1960s. Later, the passage to Barrikadnaya was built in the same location.

The station's round vestibule is on the south side of Krasnaya Presnya street, between Druzhinnikovskaya and Konyushkovskaya streets. A sculpture by A. Zelinsky entitled "Combatant" is located in front.
