= Belorusskaya (Koltsevaya line) =

Moscow Metro station

Belorusskaya Белорусская
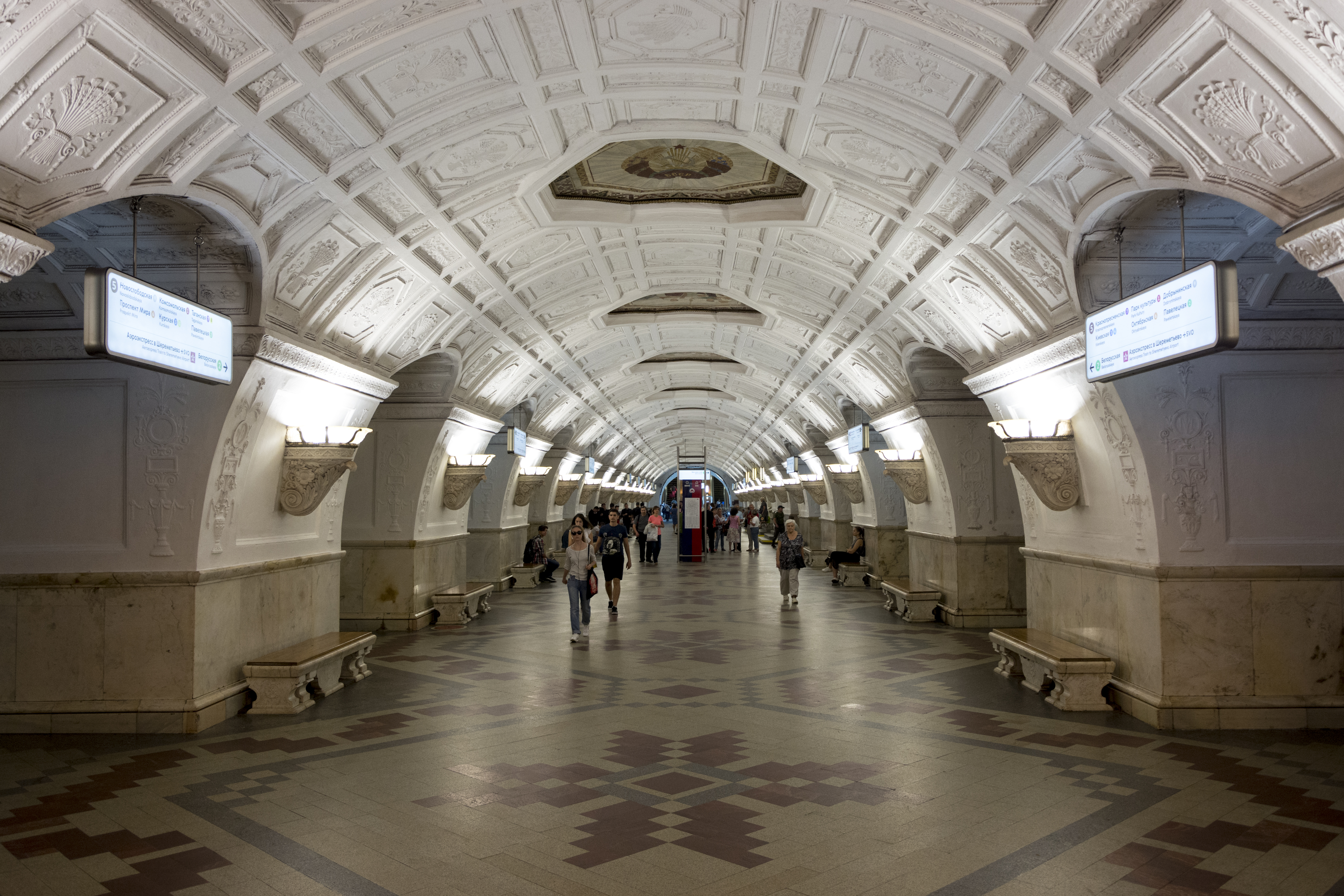

General information
- Location: Tverskoy District; Central Administrative Okrug; Moscow; Russia
- Coordinates: 55.7764°N 37.5844°E
- System: Moscow Metro station
- Owner: Moskovsky Metropoliten
- Line: Koltsevaya line
- Platforms: 1
- Tracks: 2

Construction
- Depth: 42.5 metres (139 ft)
- Platform levels: 1
- Parking: No

Other information
- Station code: 035

History
- Opened: 30 January 1952; 74 years ago

Services
Preceding station	Moscow Metro	Following station
Krasnopresnenskaya anticlockwise / outer	Koltsevaya line	Novoslobodskaya clockwise / inner
Dinamo towards Khovrino	Zamoskvoretskaya line transfer at Belorusskaya	Mayakovskaya towards Alma-Atinskaya
Route map
Location
- Location within Central Moscow

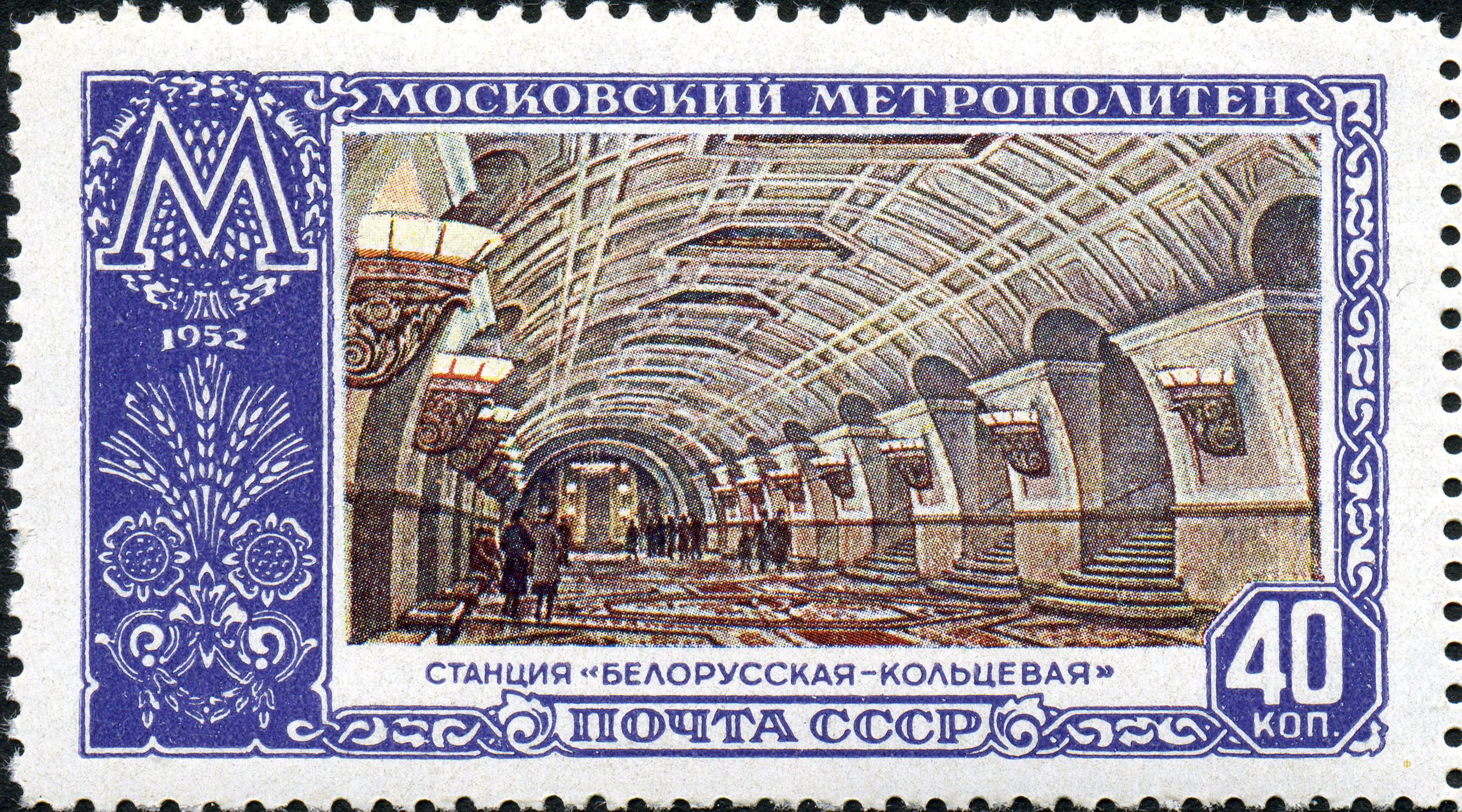
Station interior on a 1952 stamp

Belorusskaya (Russian: Белору́сская) is a station on the Moscow Metro's Koltsevaya line. It is named after the nearby Belorussky Rail Terminal. It opened in 1952, serving briefly as the terminus of the line before the circle was completed in 1954. Designed by Ivan Taranov, Z. Abramova, A. Markova, and Ya. Tatarzhinskaya, the station has low, white marble pylons, an elaborately patterned plaster ceiling, light fixtures supported by ornate scroll-shaped brackets, and a variety of decorations based on Belarusian themes.

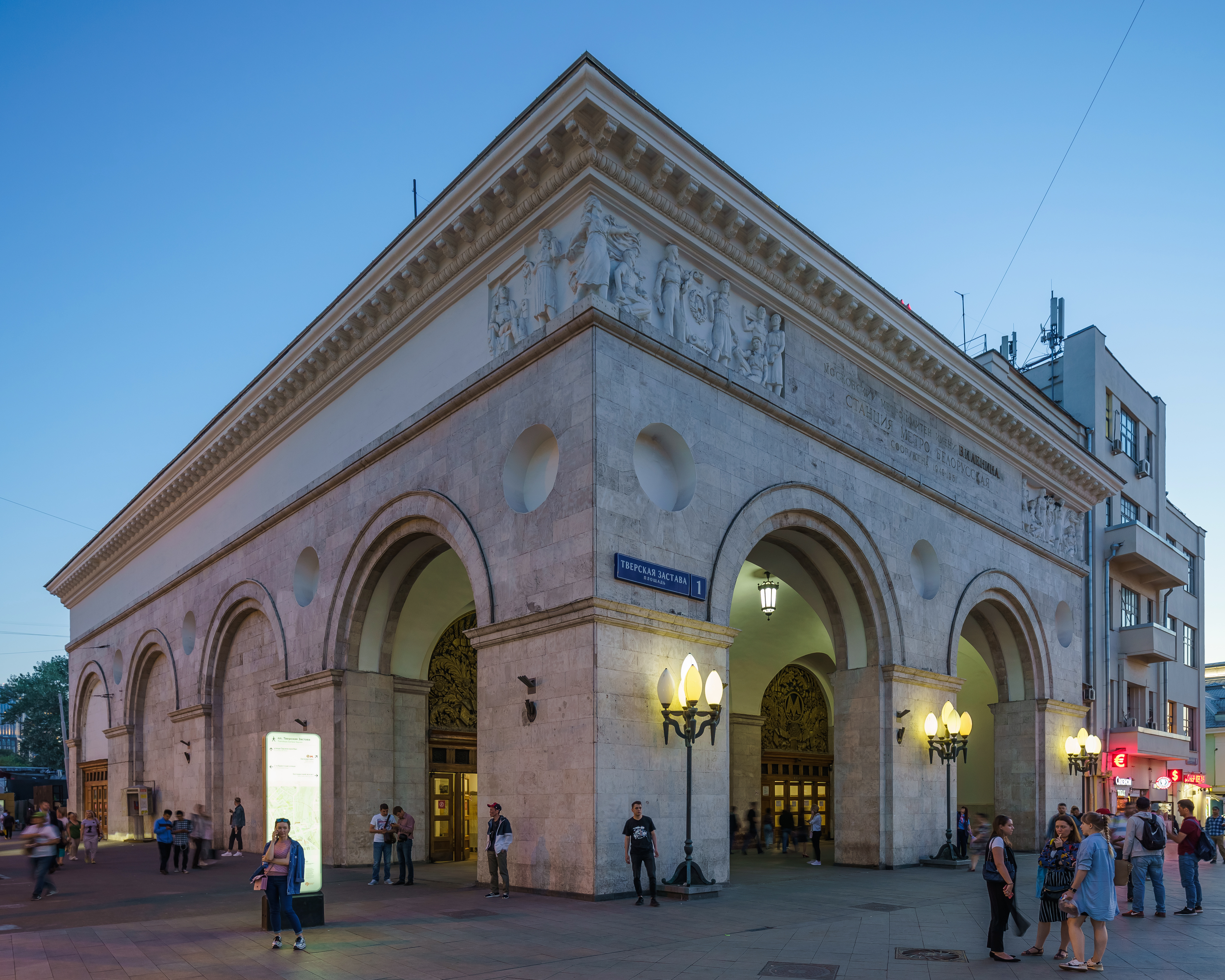
Vestibule

Overhead, twelve octagonal mosaics by G. Opryshko, S. Volkov, and I. Morozov depict Belarusian daily life, and underfoot the platform is intricately tiled to resemble a Belarusian quilt. A sculptural group by sculptor Matvey Manizer called "Soviet Belorussia" used to stand at the end of the platform before it was removed in 1998 to make room for a second entrance. Another sculptural group, "Belarusian Partisans," by S.M. Orlov, S. M. Rabinovich, and I. A. Slonim, is located in the passage between this station and Belorusskaya–Radialnaya.

The station's original vestibule is located at the southwest corner of Belorusskaya Square. A newer entrance opens onto Butirsky Val Street.

In 2002, a bomb exploded under one of Belorusskaya's marble benches, injuring seven people.

== Transfers ==
From this station passengers can transfer to Belorusskaya on the Zamoskvoretskaya line, whose metro entrance in closest to Aeroexpress, direct train to Sheremetevo Airport.
