= House with Chambers in Small Palashevsky Lane =

House with Chambers in the Small Palashevsky Lane
- Дом с палатами в Малом Палашёвском переулке
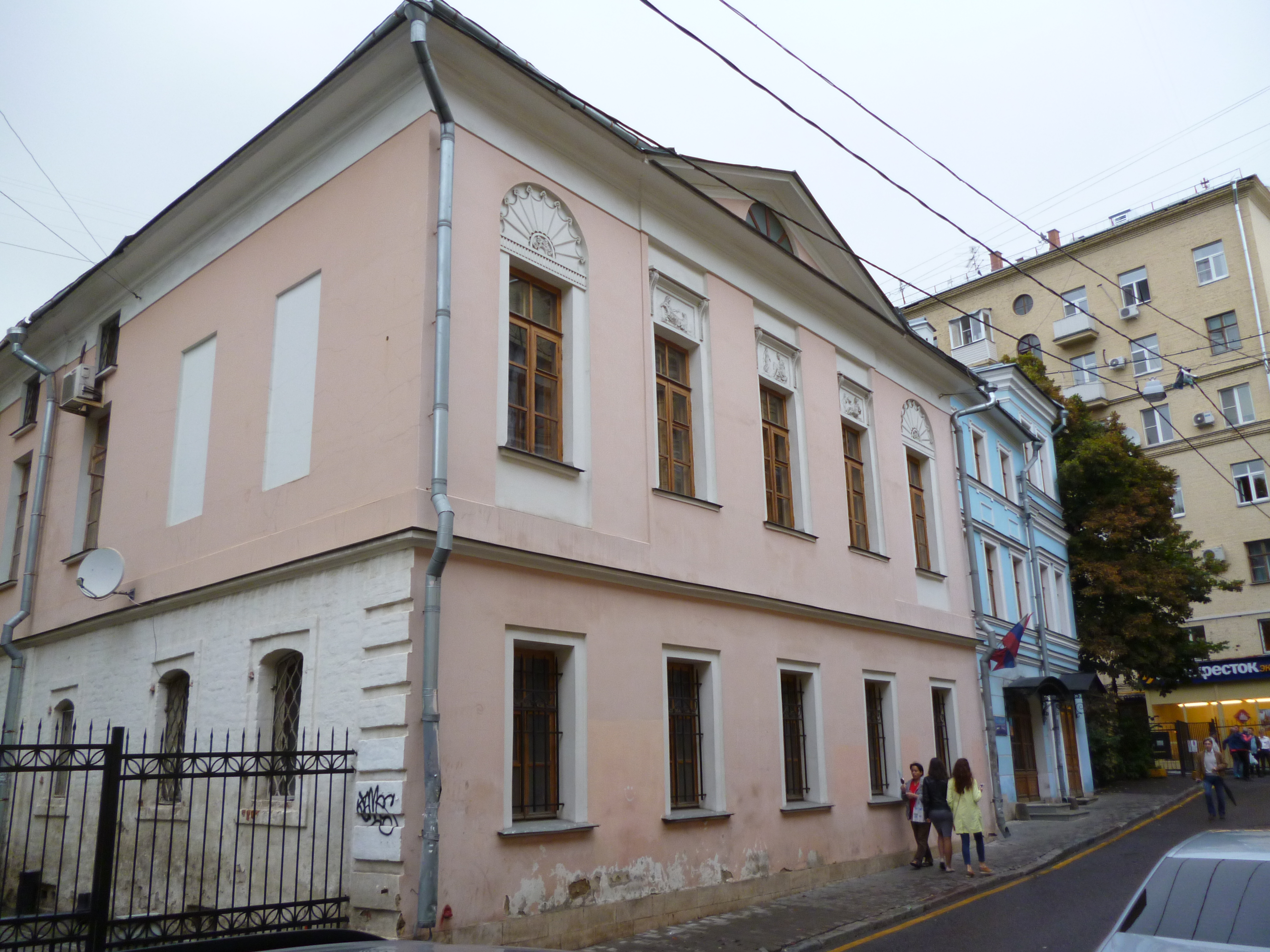
- Location: 7 Small Palashevsky Lane, Moscow
- Coordinates: 55°45′56″N 37°36′09″E

The House with Chambers in the Small Palashevsky Lane (Russian: Дом с палатами в Малом Палашёвском переулке) is a historical building in the center of Moscow (7 Small Palashevsky lane). At the base of the building, built in the late 18th century, are the chambers of the 17th century. The house with chambers has the status of an object of cultural heritage of federal significance.

== History ==
Initially, the Chambers in the Small Palashevsky Lane stood opposite the Church of the Nativity of Christ in the Palashi (demolished in the 1930s).

At the end of the 18th century and the beginning of the 19th century, the chambers in Maly Palashevsky Lane were built on a high second floor. The facade of the house was decorated in the style of neoclassicism. The yard of the house has a mezzanine.

At the beginning of the 19th century, the house belonged to the wife of captain L.I. Melgunova. In the second half of the 19th century the house belonged to Adelaide Sergeevna Yakovleva, as well as the neighboring property that faced Tverskaya Street. She rented a mansion in the alley for rent, but lived in a house on Tverskaya Street.

In the 1880s and 1890s, the house was rented by poet Aleksey Ermilovich Razorenov. He opened his own "vegetable shop" in it, which became a kind of literary club, where mainly self-taught poets gathered.

In the 1920s, the Union housed the Union of Lithuanian Proletarian Writers named after Yu. Yanonis. In the 1980s, restoration work was carried out, during which a fragment of the original wall of the chambers of the 17th century was revealed (the southern wall that faced the church).

Now the building is occupied by the Moscow Department of Trade and Services and the restaurant "Scandinavia".
