= Kutuzovskaya =

Kutuzovskaya:

- Kutuzovskaya (Filyovskaya Line)
- Kutuzovskaya (Moscow Central Circle)
- Kutuzovskaya (railroad station)
