= Kutuzovsky Prospekt =

Avenue in Moscow, Russia

Kutuzovsky Avenue
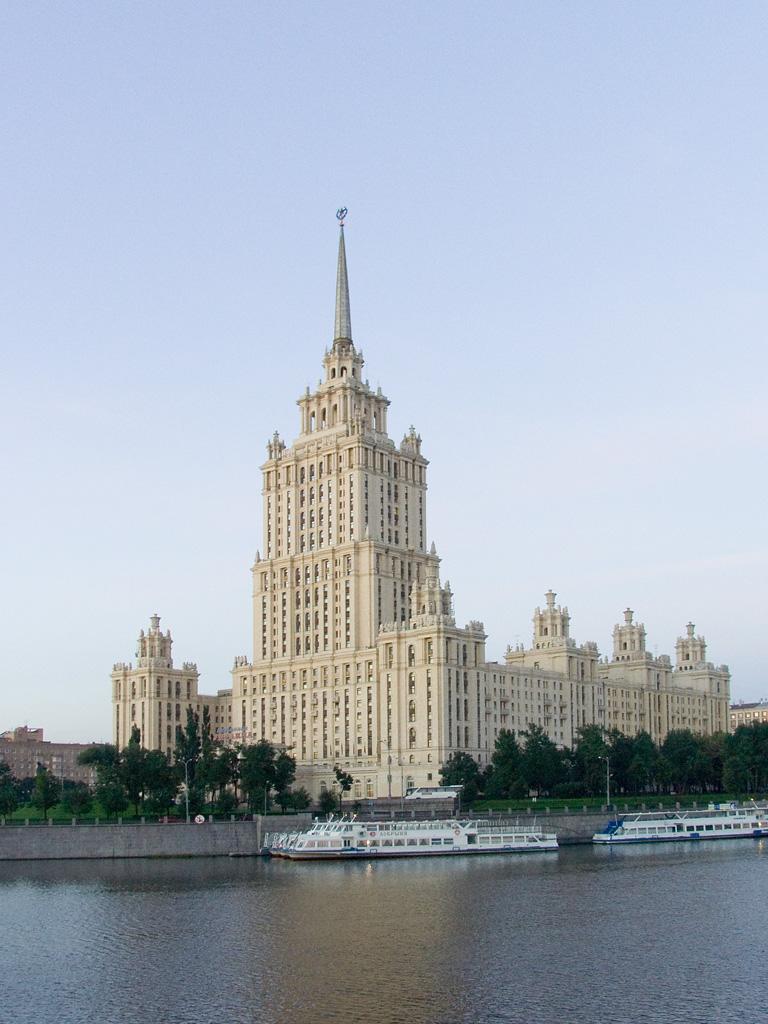
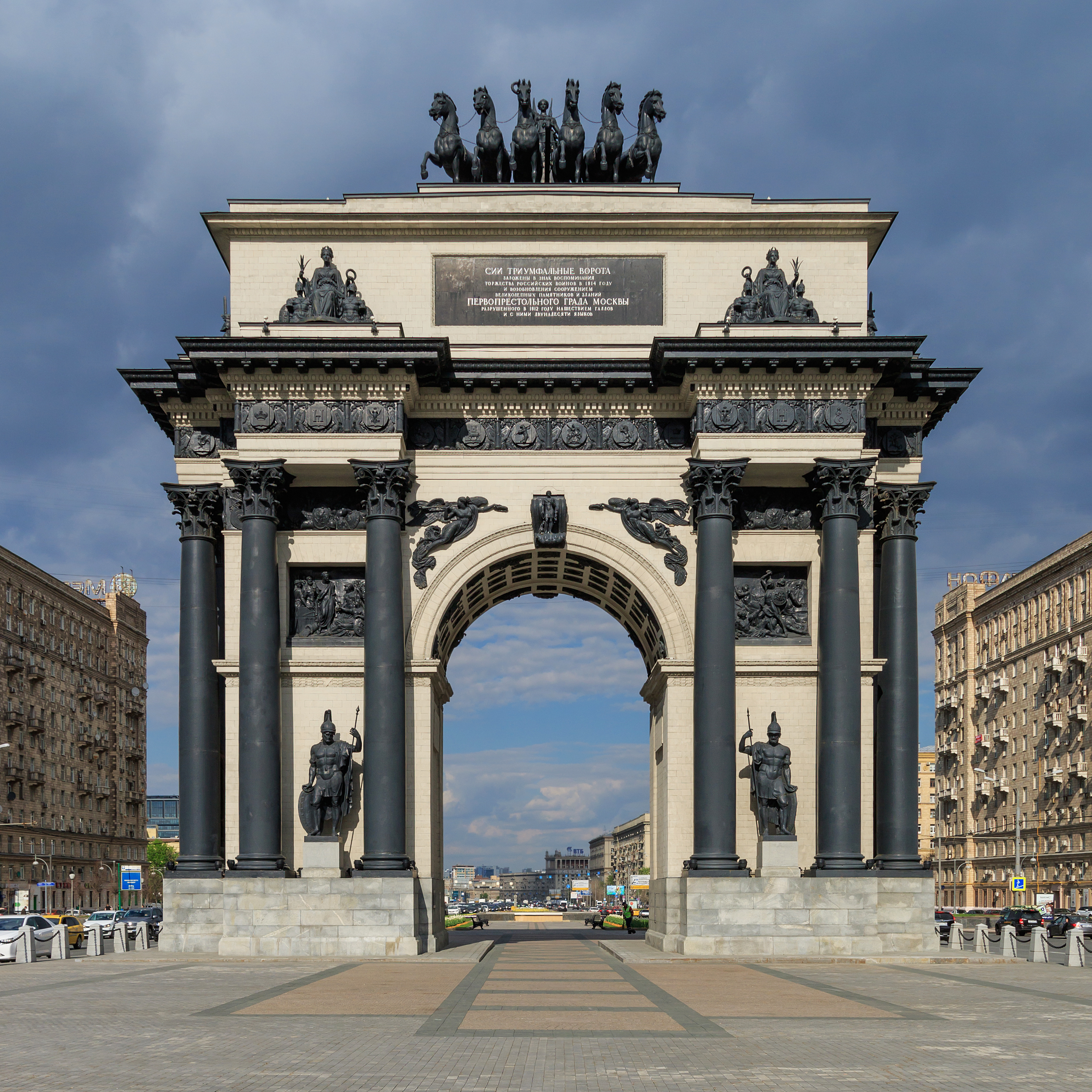
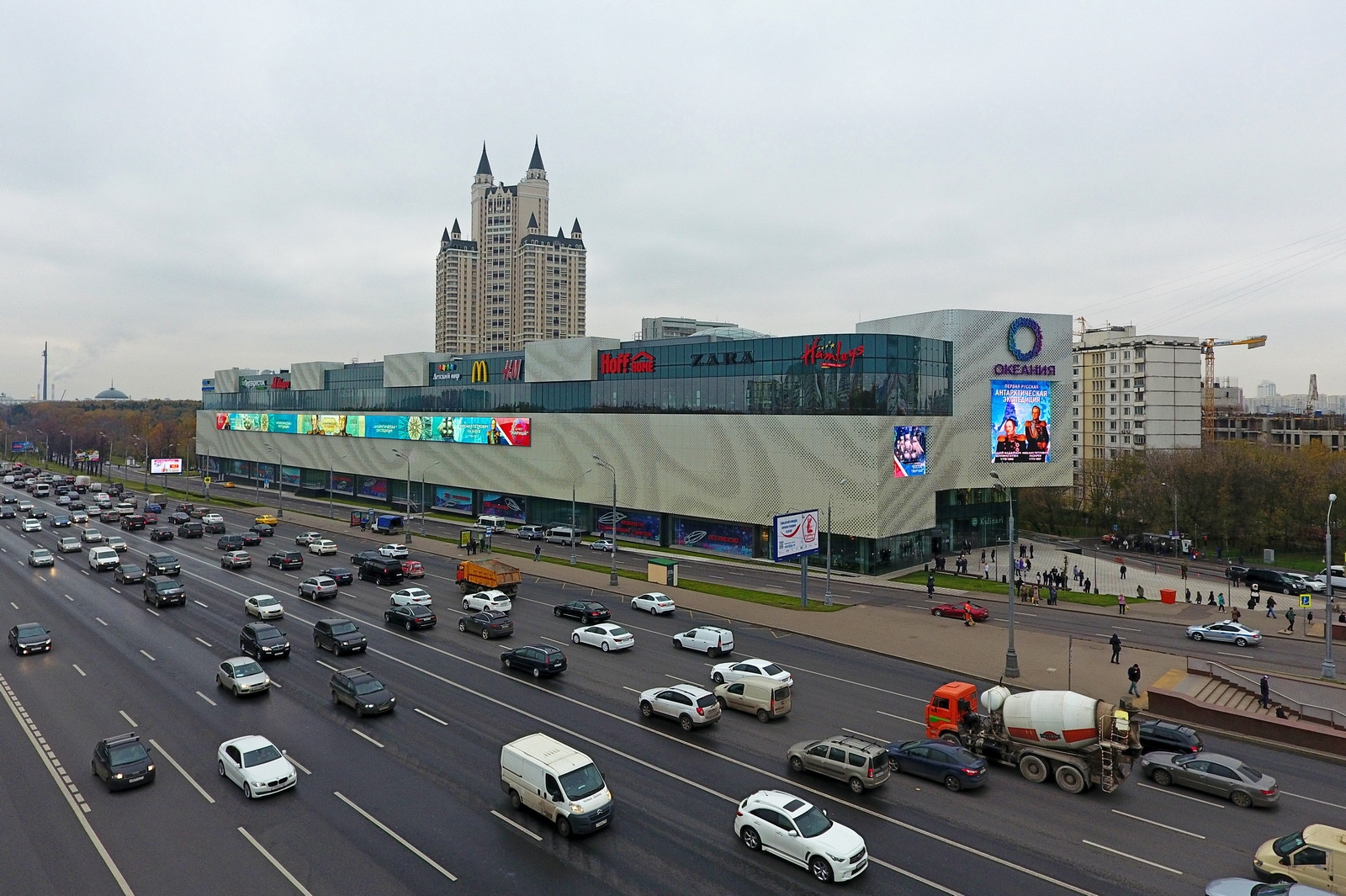
- Top to bottom: Radisson Royal Hotel, Triumphal Arch, Oceania Shopping Center
- Native name: Кутузовский проспект (Russian)
- Length: 8.3 km (5.2 mi)
- Location: Moscow; Western Administrative Okrug; Dorogomilovo District; Fili-Davydkovo District
- Nearest metro station: Kutuzovskaya; Kutuzovskaya; Park Pobedy; Slavyansky Bulvar
- Coordinates: 55°44′08″N 37°30′47″E

Kutuzovsky Prospekt (Russian: Куту́зовский проспе́кт) is a major radial avenue in Moscow, Russia, named after Mikhail Illarionovich Kutuzov, leader of the Russian field army during the French invasion of Russia of 1812. The prospekt continues a westward path of Vozdvizhenka Street and New Arbat Avenue from Novoarbatsky Bridge over the Moskva (river) to the junction with Rublyovskoye Shosse; past this point, the route changes its name to Mozhaiskoye Shosse.

== Overview ==
Present-day Kutuzovsky Prospekt emerged between 1957 and 1963, incorporating part of the old Mozhaiskoye Schosse (buildings no. 19 to 45) that was rebuilt in grand Stalinist style in the late 1930s on the site of the former Dorogomilovo Cemetery, and the low-rise neighborhoods of Kutuzovskaya Sloboda Street and Novodorogomilovskaya Street that were razed in the 1950s. The official name in honour of Kutuzov was approved in 1952 personally by Joseph Stalin. Initially, Kutuzovsky Prospekt extended east to the Garden Ring; however, in 1963, at the beginning of the New Arbat Avenue redevelopment, the segment between the Garden Ring and Novoarbatsky Bridge was assigned to New Arbat (then known as Prospekt Kalinina).

The eastern part of the Prospekt (within Dorogomilovo District), developed between 1938 and 1963, has been traditionally an expensive, high-quality residential area and hosted the social elite, including Leonid Brezhnev's family. The segment west of the Poklonnaya Hill is less affluent, with standardized 1950s–1980s housing; one notable exception is the luxury Edelweiss apartment tower built in the 2000s.

== Notable buildings ==
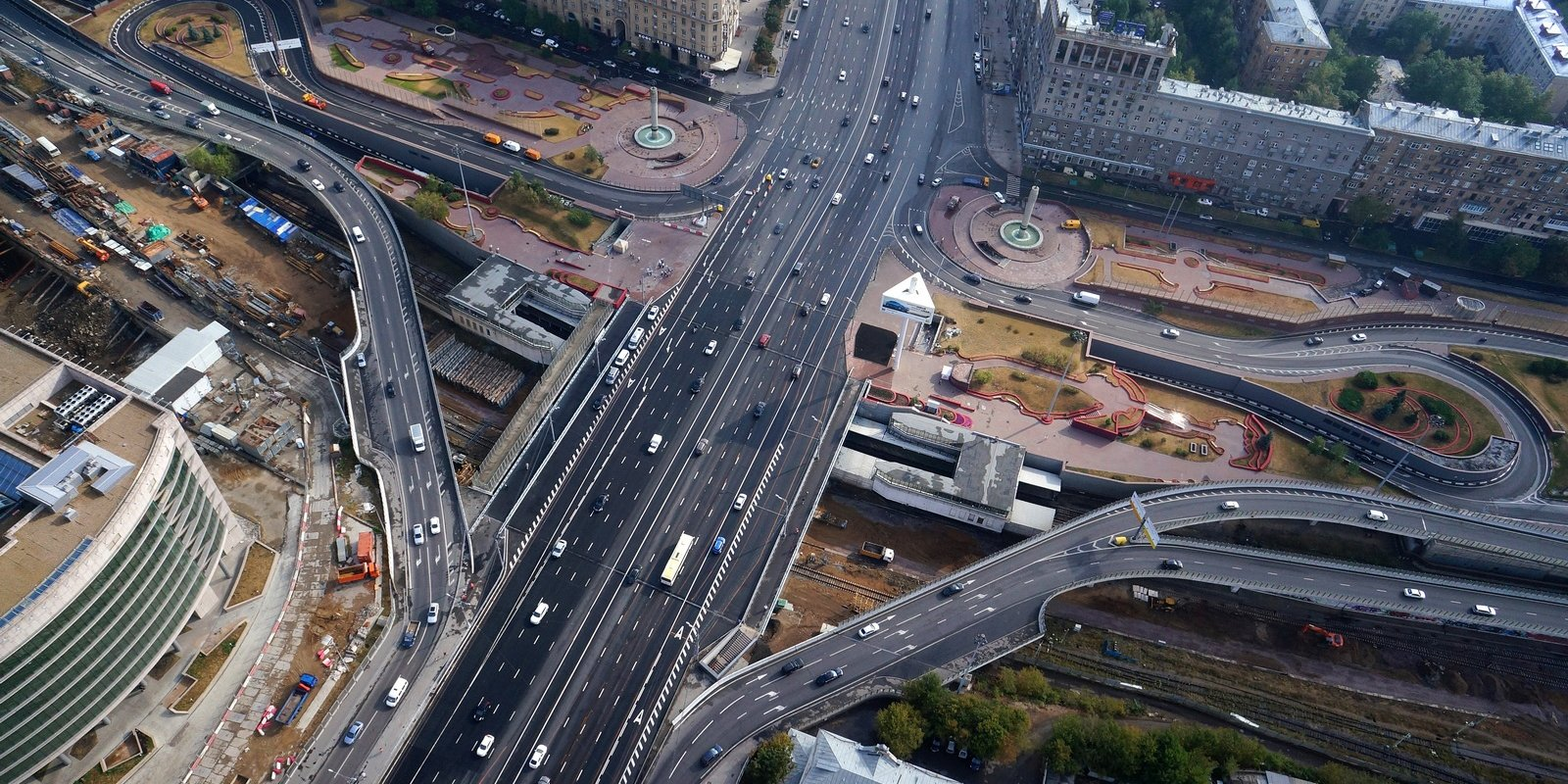
An interchange of Kutuzovskiy Prospekt (on top) and the Third Road Ring (in tunnel).

Notable buildings and institutions include:

- 2 - Hotel Ukraina
- 26 - Apartment building that housed Leonid Brezhnev, Mikhail Suslov, and Yuri Andropov
- 32 - Sberbank City
- 38 - Borodino Panorama museum
- The Poklonnaya Hill Arch on 1941–1945 Victory Square
- Museum of Great Patriotic War and Victory Park (ru) (Парк Победы, Victory Park) on the site of the former Poklonnaya Hill.

== See also ==
- Dorogomilovo District contains the eastern, affluent segment of Kutuzovsky Prospekt
