= Dorogomilovo District =

Dorogomilovo District район Дорогомилово (Russian)
- District
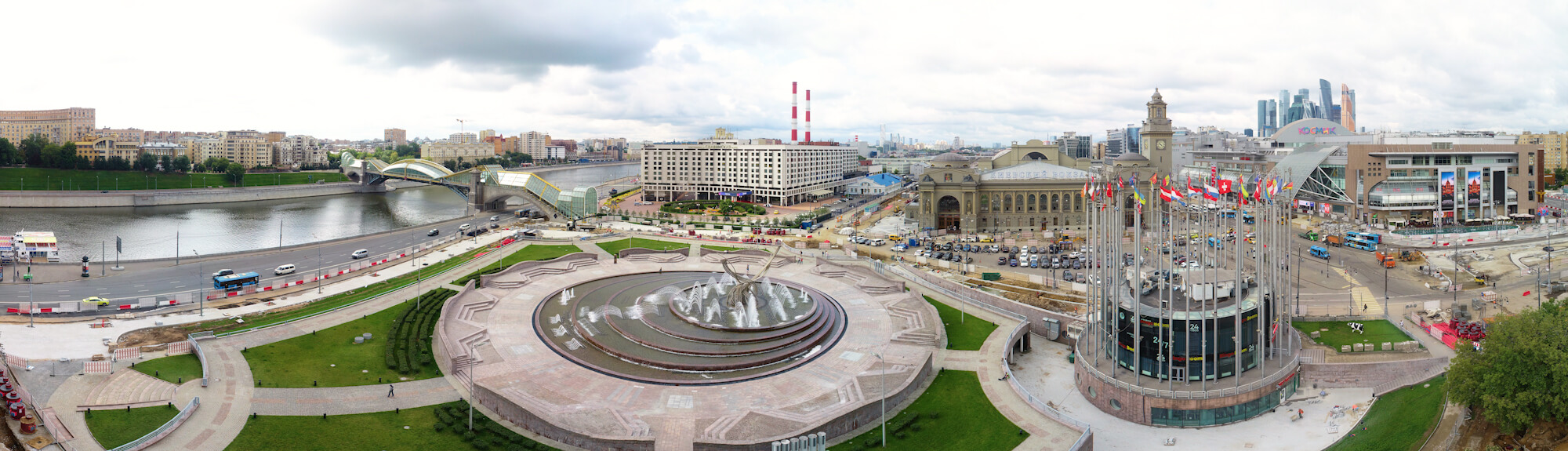
- Dorogomilovo District

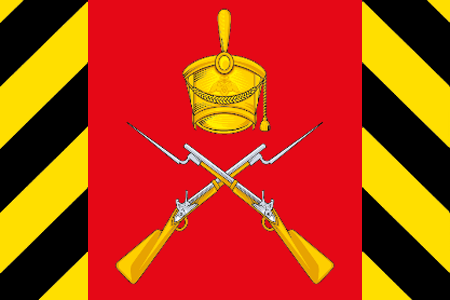
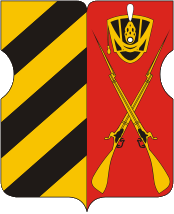
- Flag Coat of arms
- Location of Dorogomilovo District in Moscow
- Coordinates: 55°44′26″N 37°32′25″E
- Country: Russia
- Federal subject: Moscow

Area
  - Total: 7.93 km^{2} (3.06 sq mi)

Population (2010 Census)
  - Total: 67,720
  - Estimate (2017): 71,900
  - Density: 8,540/km^{2} (22,100/sq mi)
  - Urban: 100%
  - Rural: 0%
- Time zone: UTC+
- OKTMO ID: 45318000
- Website: http://dorogomilovo.mos.ru/

Dorogomilovo District (Russian: райо́н Дорогоми́лово) is a district of Western Administrative Okrug of the federal city of Moscow, Russia. The area of the district is 7.93 square kilometres (3.06 mi^{2}). Population: 67,720 (2010 census); 59,732 (2002 census). Postal codes: 113000 to 119000.

The district is adjacent to the Presnensky, Arbat, and Khamovniki Districts of Central Administrative Okrug.

== History ==
Original Dorogomilovo sloboda was located on the opposite (eastern) bank of the Moskva River, between Khamovniki and Novodevichy Monastery. Peasants of this sloboda, personally free, were paying their taxes with Yam (mail coach) service on the old road to Smolensk, the main link between Moscow and Poland. Smolensk was annexed by Moscow in the course of the Russo-Polish War, and as a result the road was straightened and a new river crossing emerged on site of present-day Borodinsky Bridge. Dorogomilovo sloboda relocated to the western bank, to present-day Dorogomilovo. For the next two hundred years, the new and the old settlements shared the same name. The only other settlement on the western bank was a fishing village owned by the Patriarch.

In 1731–1742, when Moscow city boundary expanded to Kamer-Kollezhsky Val limits, Dorogomilovo sloboda was incorporated into Moscow. Gradually, the once-free coach-drivers were stripped of their liberties and reduced to taxpayer peasant status. Former sloboda population decreased from 117 households in 1699 to 24 in 1801. Instead, Dorogomilovo acquired one of Moscow's largest cemeteries (Orthodox, 1771, Jewish, 1788).

In 1812, Old Smolensk Road witnessed the retreat of Russian troops and Napoleon's conquest of Moscow. The village of Fili, where Kutuzov made his decision to abandon Moscow, is situated just outside the modern Dorogomilovo District boundary. The French marched to Moscow in three columns, crossing the river in Fili, Dorogomilovo, and Luzhniki. Meanwhile, wounded at Battle of Borodino were dying and buried at Dorogomilovo cemeteries.

Industrial development of the 19th century was slow, due to the regular floods. The main employers in the area was a brewery set on a hill in 1875, still operating as Badayev Brewery (19th century postcard), a dye factory (1883), and a cement plant (1894). Newspapers, describing 1879 flood, wrote that "brewery workers managed to roll out a beer barrel and floated away from the site"... Development was boosted by construction of Bryansky (now Kiyevsky) railroad terminal, originally built in wood (1900 postcard). In 1912, the city built new Borodinsky Bridge, which still stands. New Kiyevsky Terminal, designed by Ivan Rerberg and Vladimir Shukhov in 1912–1914, was completed during the Russian Civil War, in 1920.

=== Dorogomilovo Cathedral ===
Dorogomilovo used to have Moscow's second largest cathedral (after Christ the Saviour, photo), rated for 10,000 worshippers. It was set on the site of present-day corner block at 1 Bolshaya Dorogomilovskaya; there are no reliable explanations why it was built in such a remote and scarcely populated place. Construction of Byzantine Revival Bogoyavlensky Church proceeded from 1898 to 1910. Originally modelled after Christ the Saviour, the design was later changed from five-domed to a single dome, and externally was the most austere of Moscow cathedrals.

Starting in 1918, Bolshevik authorities began harassing the clergy, and in 1922 stripped the church of all silver and gold, causing the Dorogomilovo Riot (April 5–7, 1922). After the demolition of Christ the Saviour (1931), Dorogomilovo Cathedral was the main operating church of Russian Orthodox Church, until its destruction in 1938.

=== Modern history ===
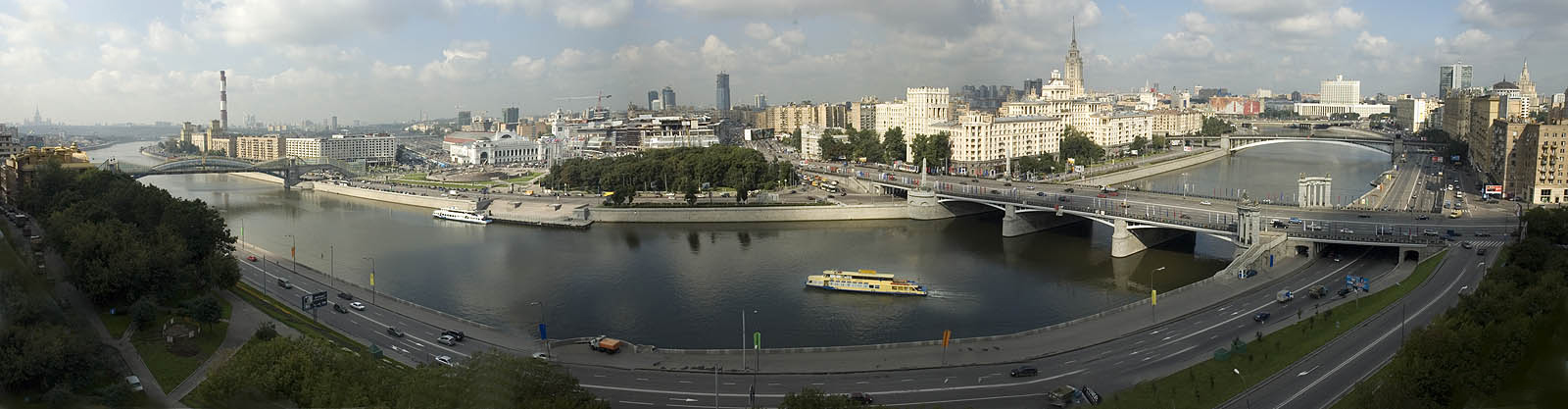
Dorogomilovo river bend, view from the west

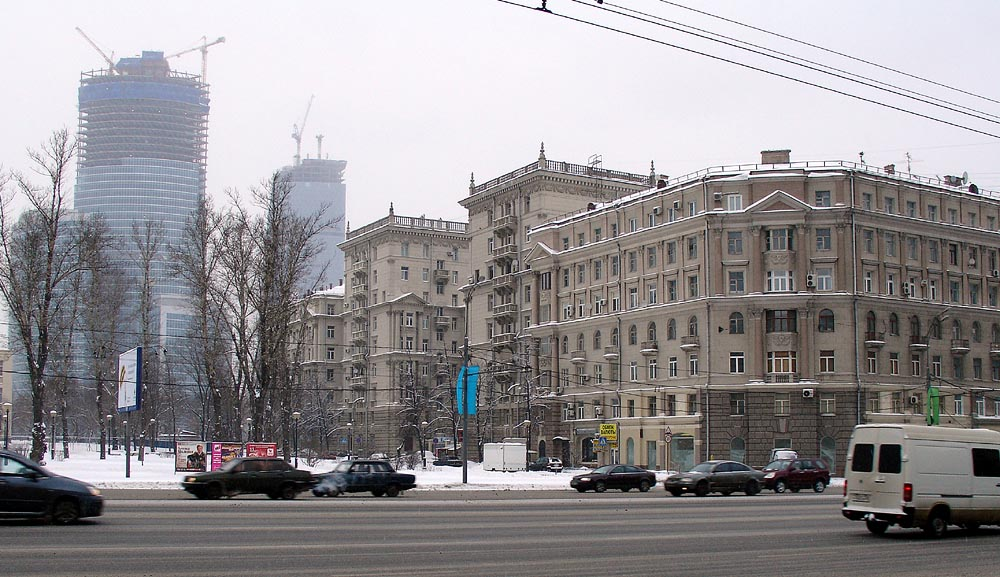
Kutuzovsky 26, Leonid Brezhnev's home

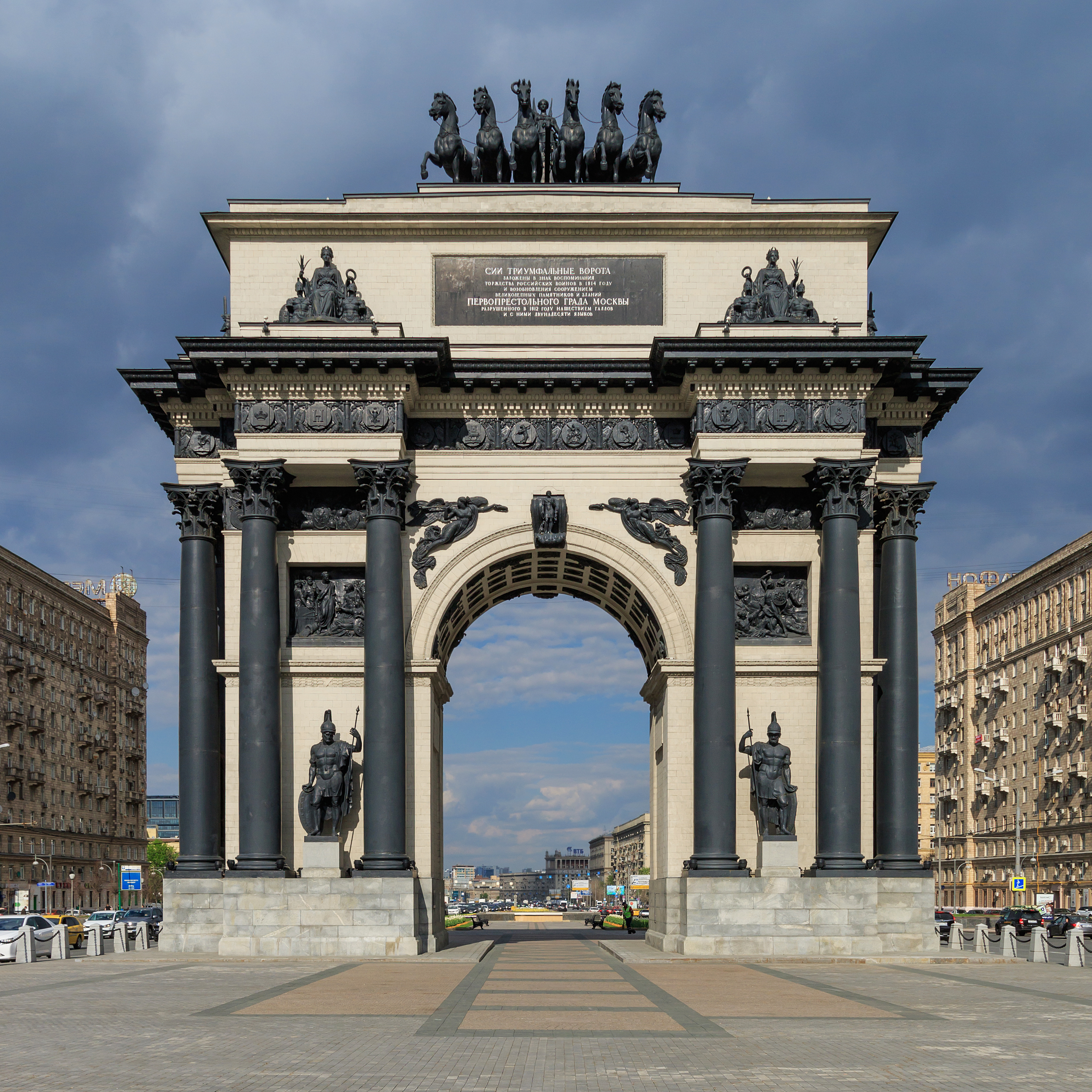
Triumphal Arch near Victory Park

In the 1920s, Dorogomilovo housed some of Moscow's post-war firsts, notably, the first new school (School No. 56 at 22 Kutuzovsky, 1927), the first new hotel (Kiyevskaya, 1934), and a student campus that gave it name to Studencheskaya Street and a metro station.

In 1935, Dorogomilovo became the site of a major stalinist architecture project. A 2.7-kilometer long stretch of Dorogomilovskaya Street and Mozhaysk highway was zoned for first-rate housing construction; half of the project was actually completed before June 1941. One of these apartment blocks, 26 Kutuzovsky, is known as Leonid Brezhnev's, Mikhail Suslov's and Yuri Andropov's home. Construction was completed during post-war years.

In 1938–1950s, Dorogomilovo cemeteries were gradually destroyed and redeveloped; however, for a short time in 1938–1940 and in 1946, relatives were allowed to re-bury the remains at out-of-town cemeteries. Remains of Isaac Levitan were relocated from Jewish cemetery to Novodevichy Cemetery. A railroad track to the brewery was severed from the main line, as a result one can see an IS20 steam locomotive stranded behind factory gates.

Post-war construction was concentrated on the embankments and the beginning of Kutuzovsky Prospect, notably, the Ukraina Hotel Skyscraper (1947–1952). Grand stalinist buildings completed the perimeters of large city blocks; inside, wooden shacks survived until the 1970s and were replaced with Brezhnev-era standard housing (of better-than-average variety).

== Notable buildings, cultural, and educational facilities ==
- Ukraina Hotel
- Museum of the Great Patriotic War, Moscow, Poklonnaya Hill, Victory Park
- Borodino Panorama (1962, painting 1912) and Kutuzov monument (1973)
- Triumphal Arch (1968), replica of 1829–1834 original by Joseph Bove that was razed in 1936
- Bagration monument (1999) and Bagration Bridge (1997)

== Education ==
The Embassy of India School Moscow is in the district.

== Public transportation access ==
Moscow Metro:

- Kievskaya-Koltsevaya, Kievskaya (Arbatsko-Pokrovskaya), Kievskaya (Filyovskaya) - west
- Studencheskaya, Kutuzovskaya - center
- Fili - north (industrial grounds only)
- Park Pobedy - west, Victory Park and Borodino Panorama
