= Tverskaya Zastava Square =

Square in central Moscow

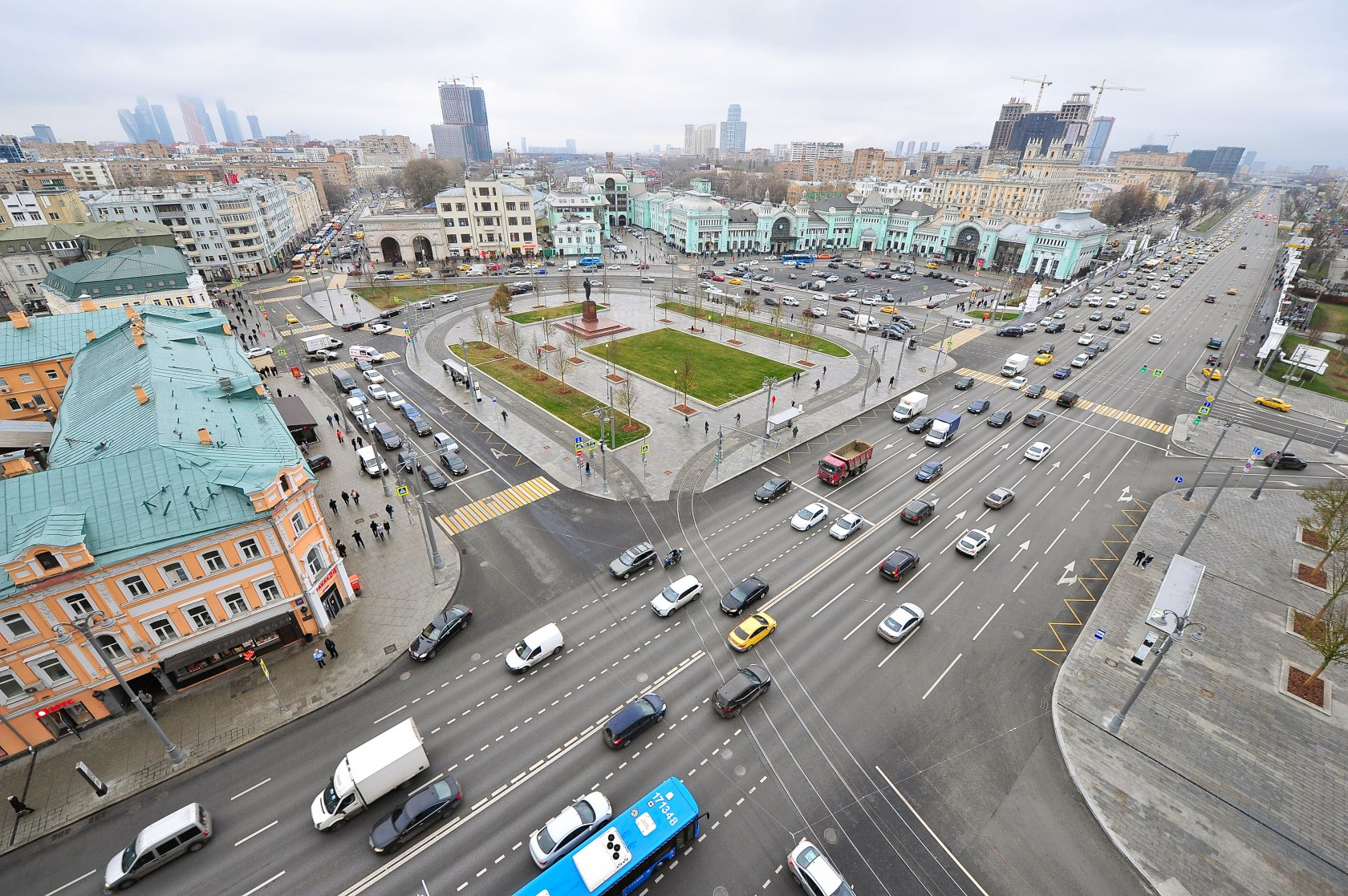
- Interactive map of Tverskaya Zastava Square
- Location: Moscow, Russia
- Nearest metro station: Belorusskaya; Belorusskaya

Construction
- Inauguration: 1742

Tverskaya Zastava (Russian: Тверская Застава) is a square in Central Administrative Okrug in Moscow. Belorussky railway station faces the square. The streets which terminate at the square are Leningradsky Avenue, Gruzinsky Val, 2nd Brestskaya Street, 1st Brestskaya Street, 1st Tverskaya-Yamskaya Street, Lesnaya Street, and Butyrsky Val.

== History ==
The site of the square is the former edge of the city of Moscow on the road to Tver. A customs post (zastava) was established there in 1742. A wooden triumphal arch was erected in Tverskaya Zastava in 1814 to celebrate the return of the Russian army following their victory in Paris over Napoleon, renaming the square Triumphalnaya (Triumphal) Square. In 1834 this was replaced by a masonry arch and the square was renamed New Triumphal Gates Square.

What is now Belorussky railway station opened at the square in 1870 under the name of Smolensky station. It was renamed to Brest station after the line was extended, and again to Aleksandrovsky station after the building was redesigned. In May 1936 it was given its present name of Belorussky station. That year the square was redesigned and the arch removed; it is now on Kutuzovsky Prospekt.

By 1950 Tverskaya Zastava Square had been laid out as a park. A bronze statue of Maxim Gorky was installed there in 1951, but when the square was reconstructed in 2008, was removed to the sculpture park near the Central House of Artists.

== Gallery ==
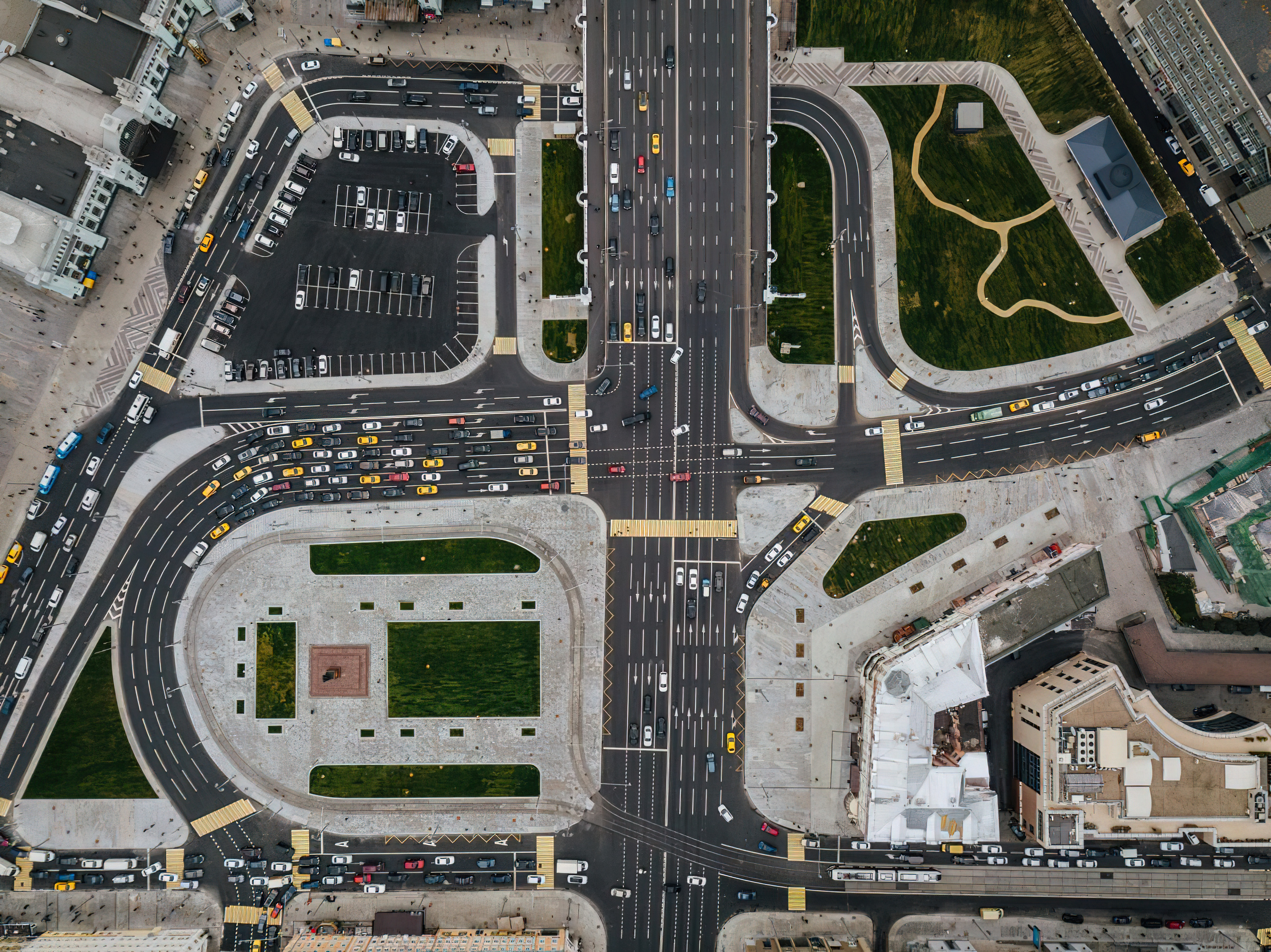
Intersection at Tverskaya Zastava Square

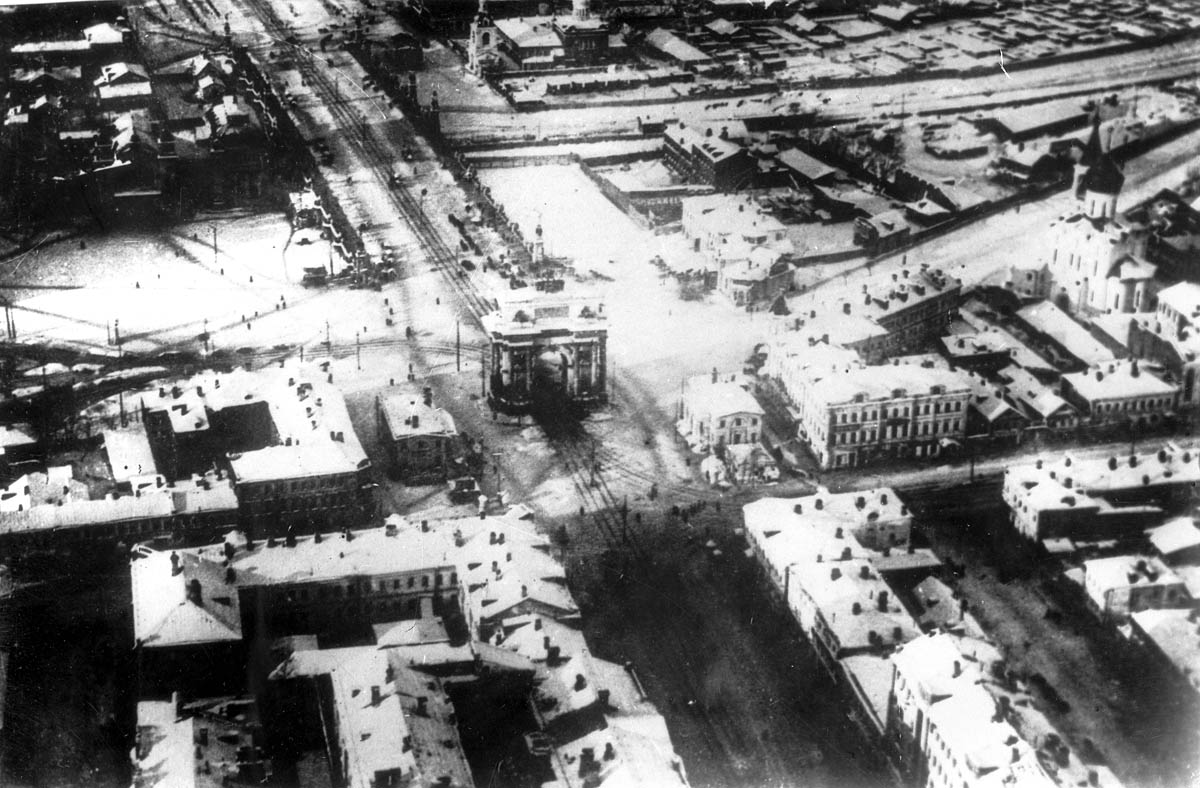
Tverskaya Zastava Square in 1920, with Triumphal Arch of Moscow

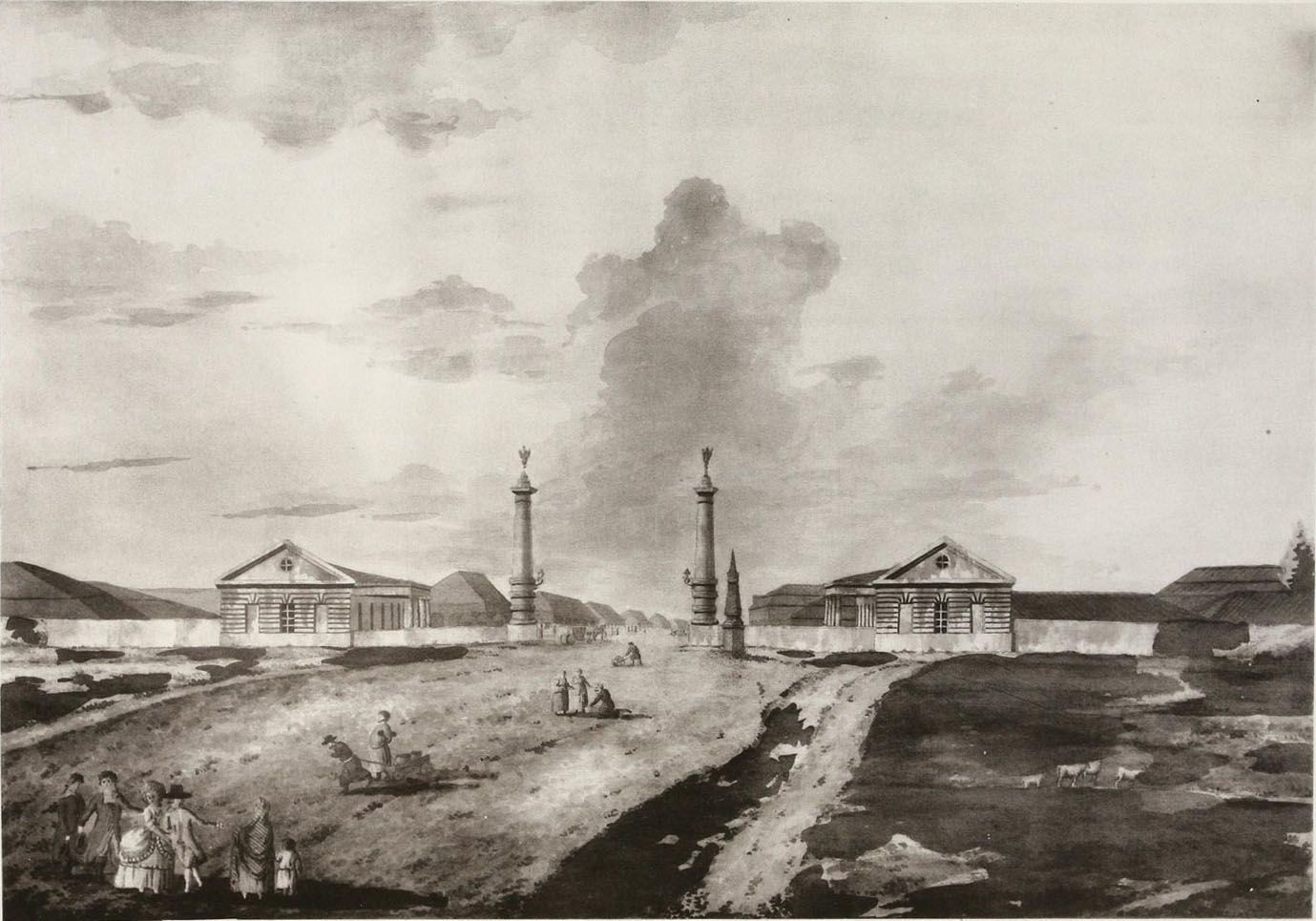
Tverskaya Zastava in the 18th century (painting by Francesco Camporesi)
