= Studencheskaya (Moscow Metro) =

Moscow Metro station

Studencheskaya Студенческая
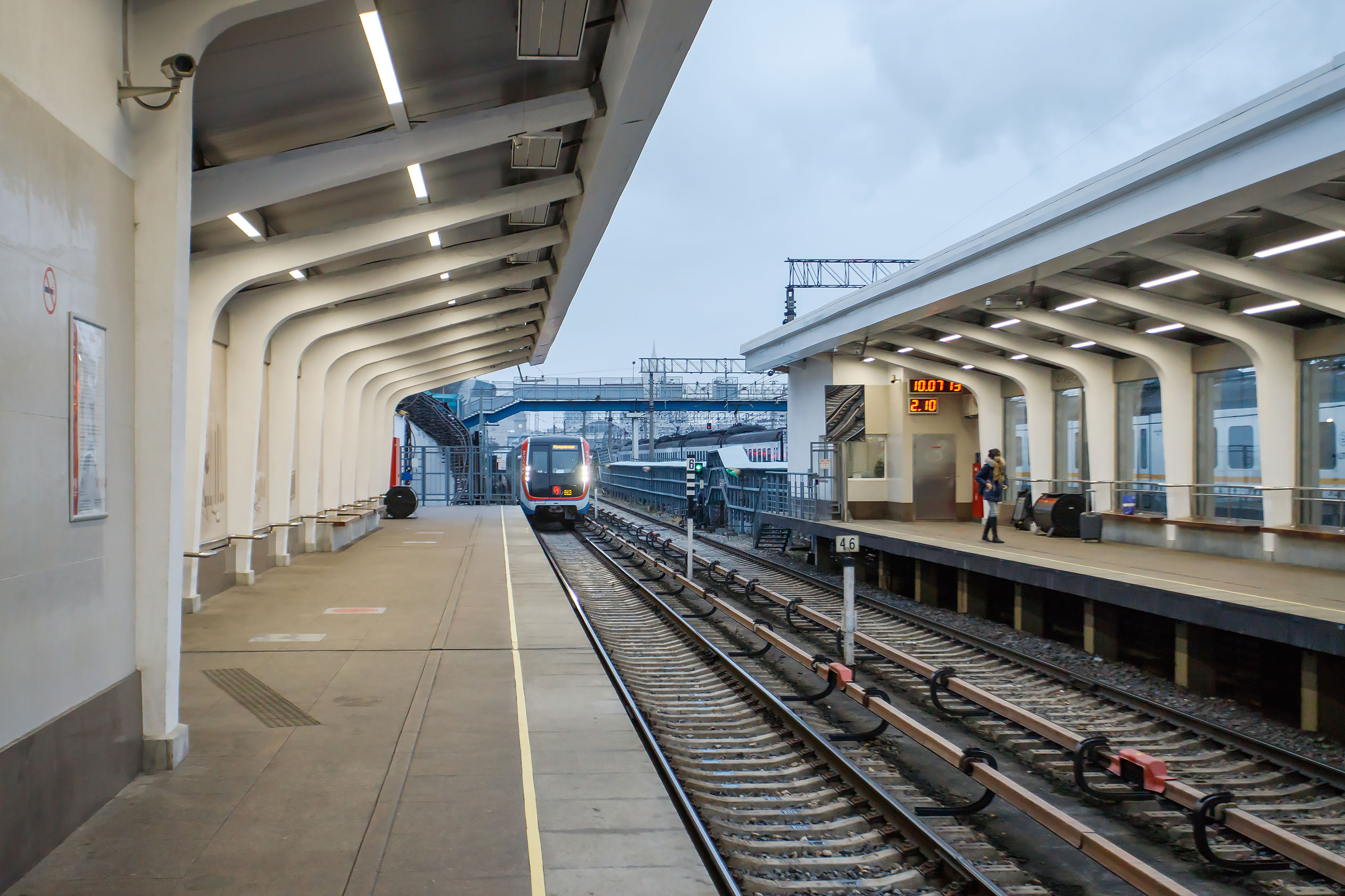

General information
- Location: Dorogomilovo District; Western Administration Okrug; Moscow; Russia
- Coordinates: 55.7388°N 37.5483°E
- System: Moscow Metro station
- Owner: Moskovsky Metropoliten
- Line: Filyovskaya line
- Platforms: 2 side platforms
- Tracks: 2

Construction
- Structure type: Ground-level, open
- Depth: surface level
- Platform levels: 1
- Parking: No

Other information
- Station code: 058

History
- Opened: 7 November 1958; 67 years ago

Services
Preceding station	Moscow Metro	Following station
Kutuzovskaya towards Kuntsevskaya	Filyovskaya line	Kiyevskaya towards Aleksandrovsky Sad
Route map
Location
- Location within Moscow Metro

Studencheskaya (Russian: Студенческая) is a Moscow Metro station in the Dorogomilovo District, Moscow, Russia. It is on the Filyovskaya Line, between Kutuzovskaya and Kiyevskaya stations.

Studencheskaya is located to the West of the Kiyevsky railway station, sandwiched between the railroad tracks and Kievskaya street. While the station is surface level, it sits in a deeper cut than normal, so that the platforms are a full story below ground level. This puts the overhead vestibule level with the street, which unusually runs parallel to the station rather than over it. Opened on 7 November 1958, Studencheskaya features unusual side platforms like its contemporaries Fili and Kutuzovskaya. The architects of all the three stations were Rimidalv Pogrebnoy and Yuriy Zenkevich.

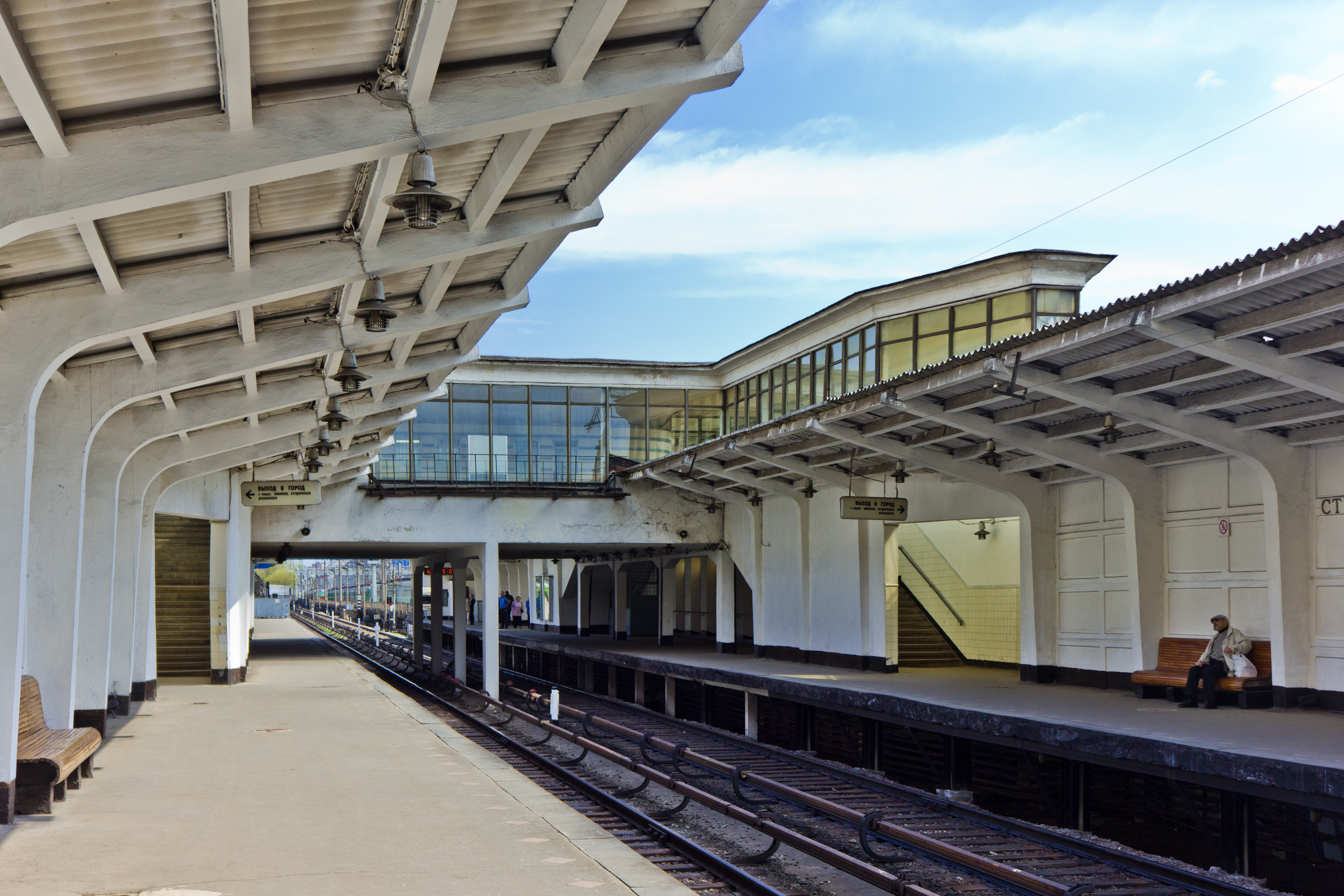
Studencheskaya before reconstruction
