= Ivan Vitali =

Russian sculptor

Ivan Vitali, by Vasily Tropinin, c. 1836, oils; Tretyakov Gallery

Ivan Petrovich Vitali (Russian: Иван Петрович Витали; 1794–1855) was a Russian sculptor of Italian descent. Born in Saint Petersburg, he was apprenticed to his father, Pietro Vitali, from an early age. After attending the Imperial Academy of Arts he moved to Moscow in 1818. His major works include a six-horse chariot for Bove's Triumphal Arch, a fountain in front of the Bolshoi Theatre (1825), the bas-reliefs above the doors of St. Isaac's Cathedral, and an outdoor bronze statue of Emperor Paul in Gatchina.

== Works ==
- Large headboard group crowning the Bauman Higher Technical School in Moscow, formerly the Trade Educationa Establishment technical training center. 1820s.
- No. 14 Solyanka street, designed by Giacomo Gilardi, bas reliefs, 1823-26
- No. 14 Leninsky Prospekt, gateway pillars (1835), and a fountain in the forecourt that "originally stood in Dzerzhinsky Square."
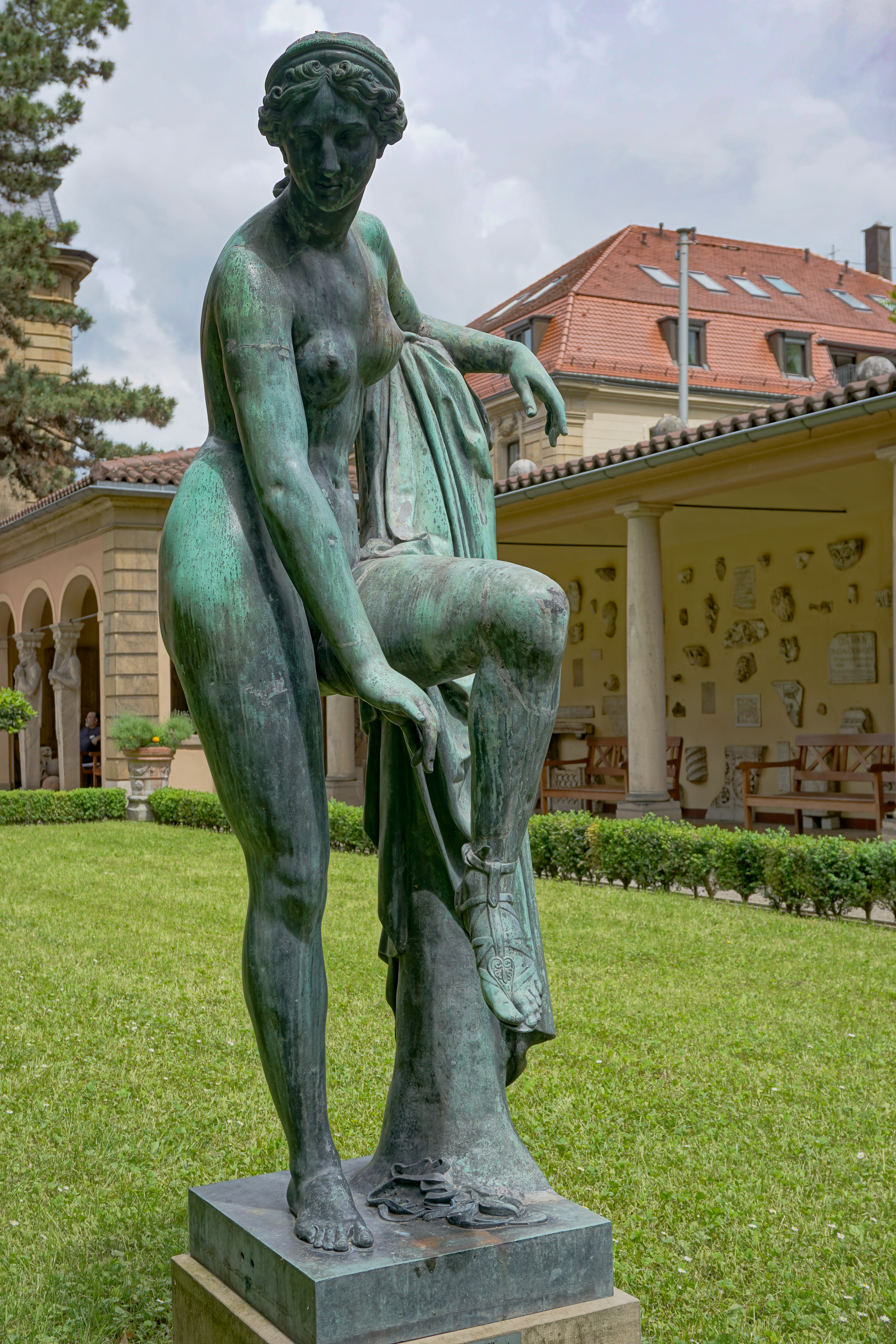
The statue of Venus removing her sandals (Stuttgart)

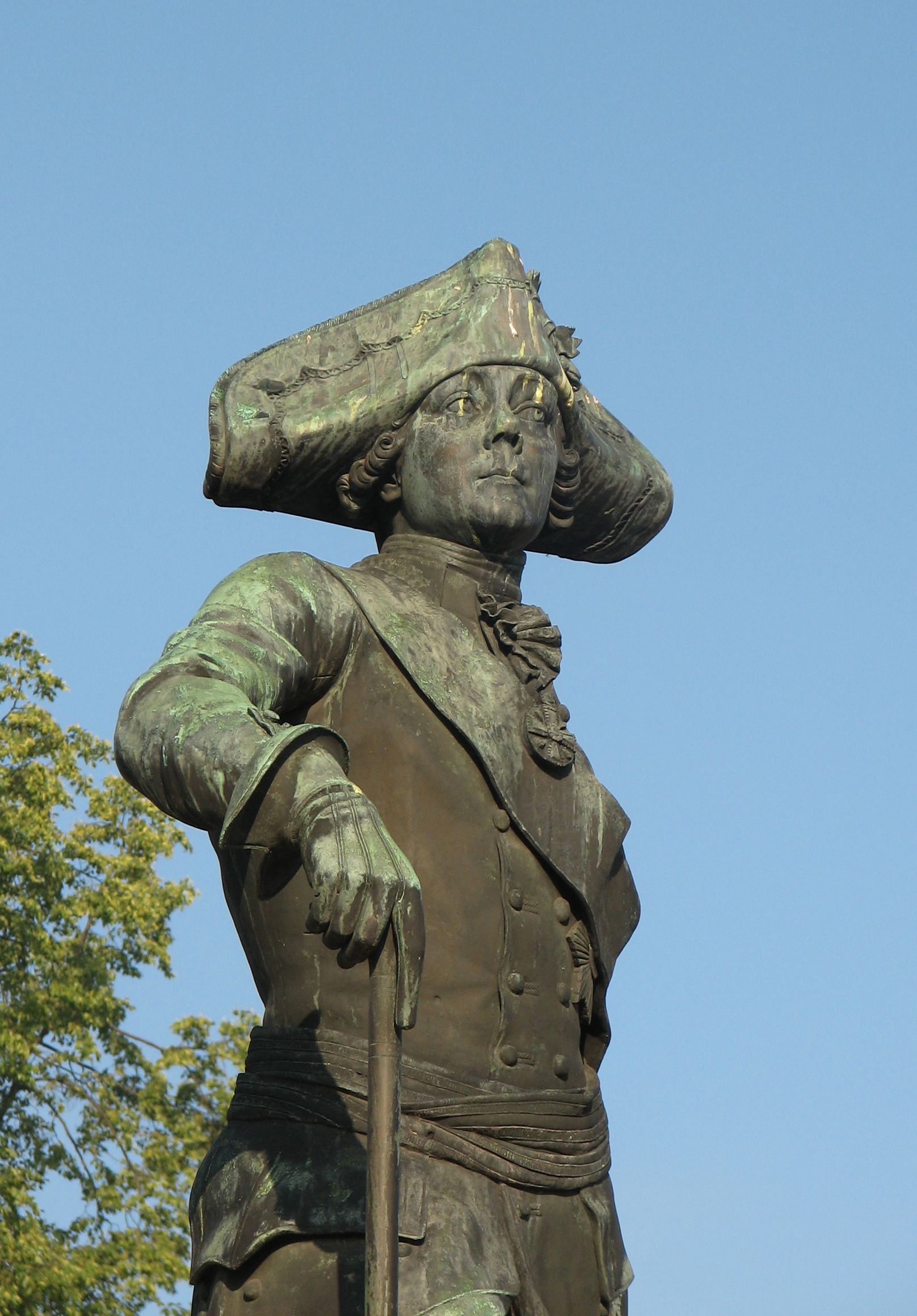
The statue of Emperor Paul in Gatchina

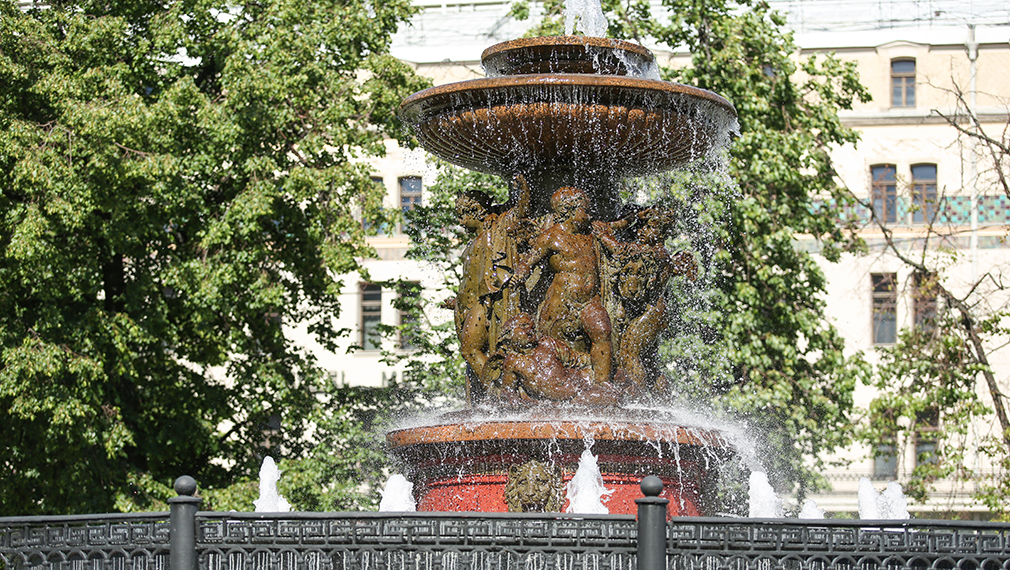
Petrovka Fountain in Moscow

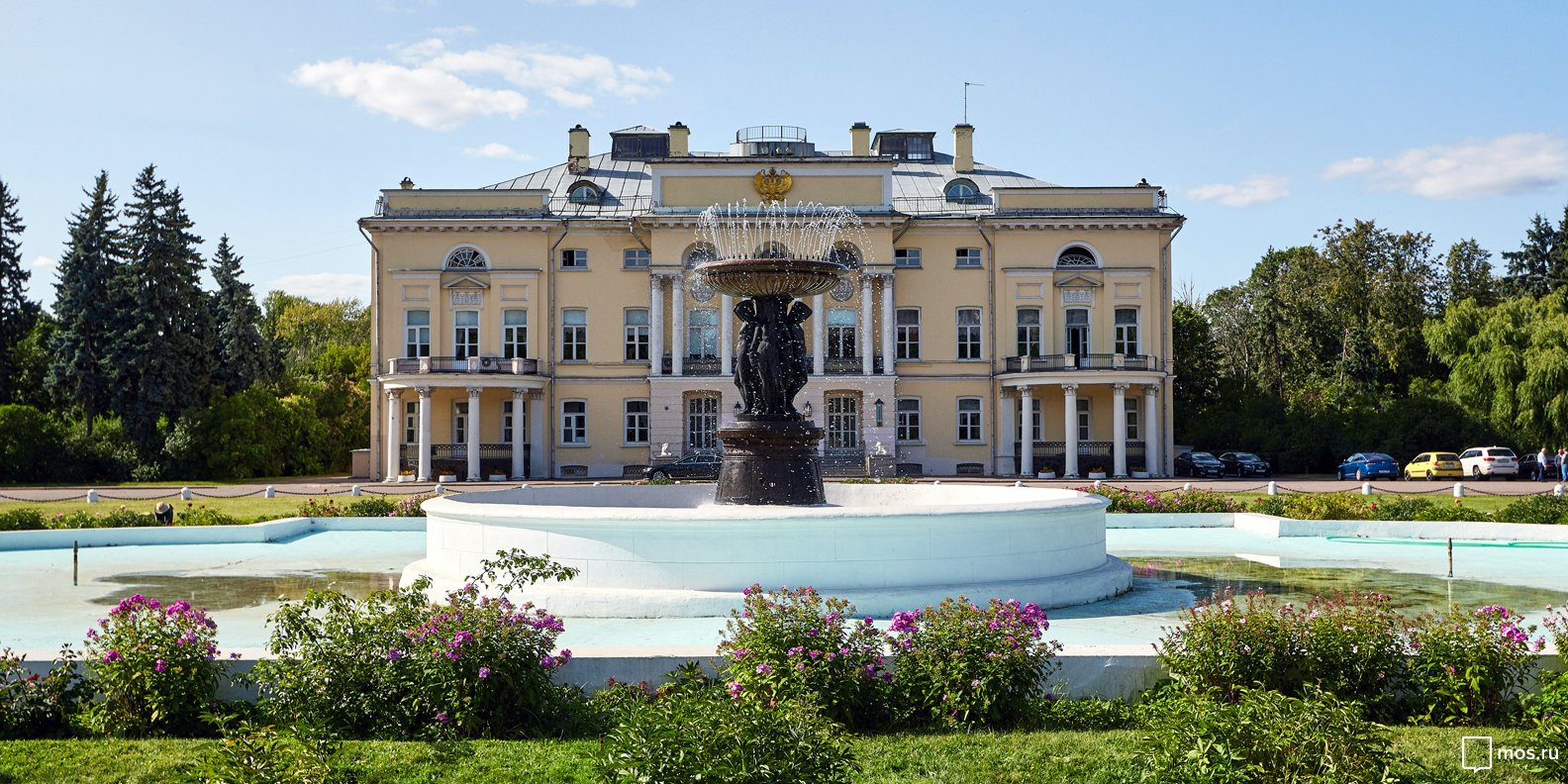
Vitali's fountain in the Neskuchny Garden

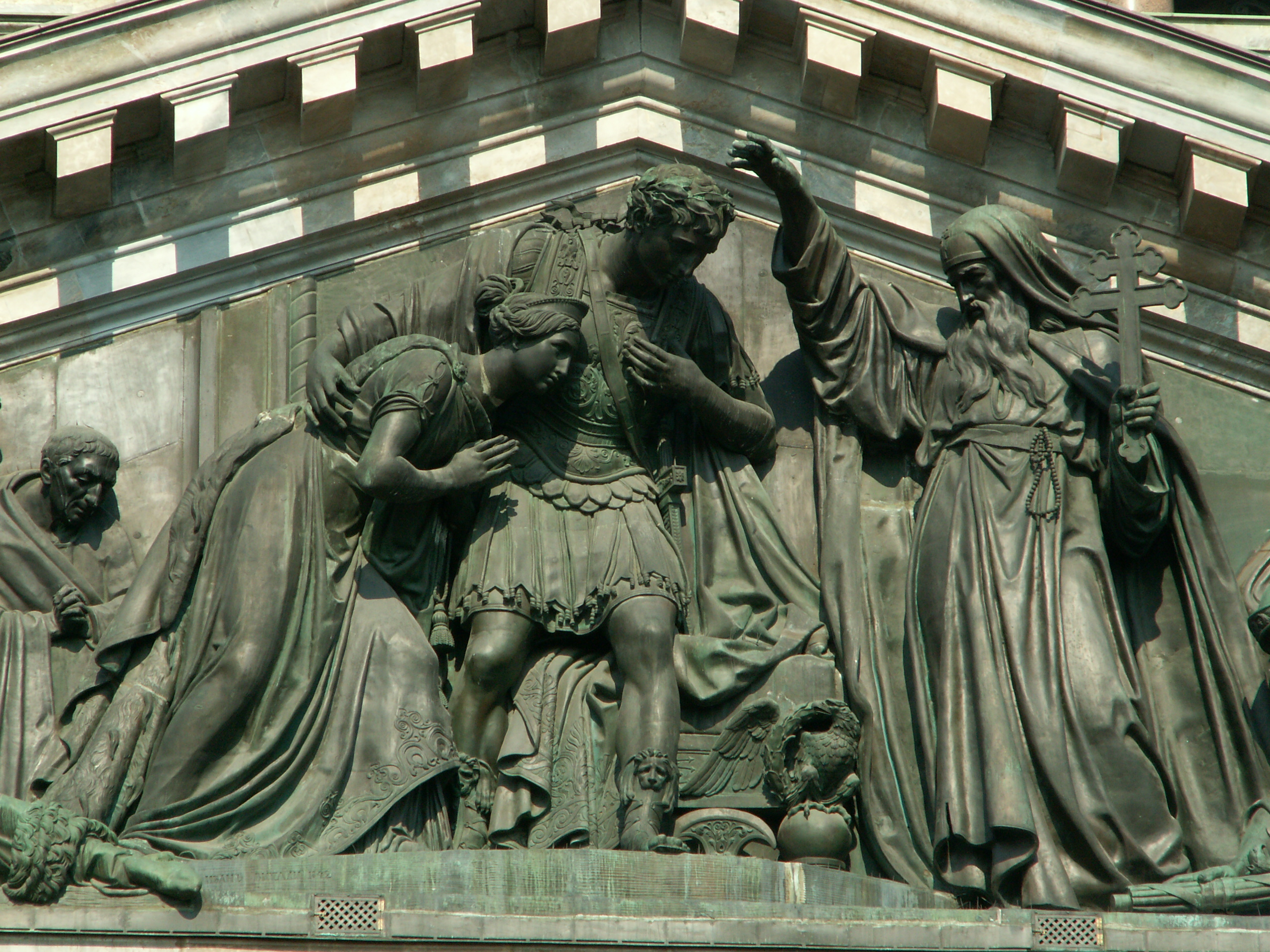
St. Isaac's Cathedral

== Bibliography ==
- Mears, Bernard (1968). Moscow: Architecture and Monuments. Translated by Bean. Moscow: Progress Publishers.
- Krivdina, Olga A. and Tychinin, Boris B. (2020). Эпоха Марка Антокольского (in Russian). Moscow: Buksmart. pp. 14–43. ISBN 978-5-907043-97-8. OCLC 1225281074.
- Ramazanov, Nikolai A. (2014). Belyaev, Nikolai S. (ed.). Материалы для истории художеств в России (PDF) (in Russian). St. Petersburg: Library of the Russian Academy of Sciences. ISBN 978-5-336-00162-4. OCLC 952577337.
- Якирина Т. В., Одноралов Н. В., Витали, Л.-М., 1960.
