= Moscow–Brest Railway =

Railway line in Russia and Belarus

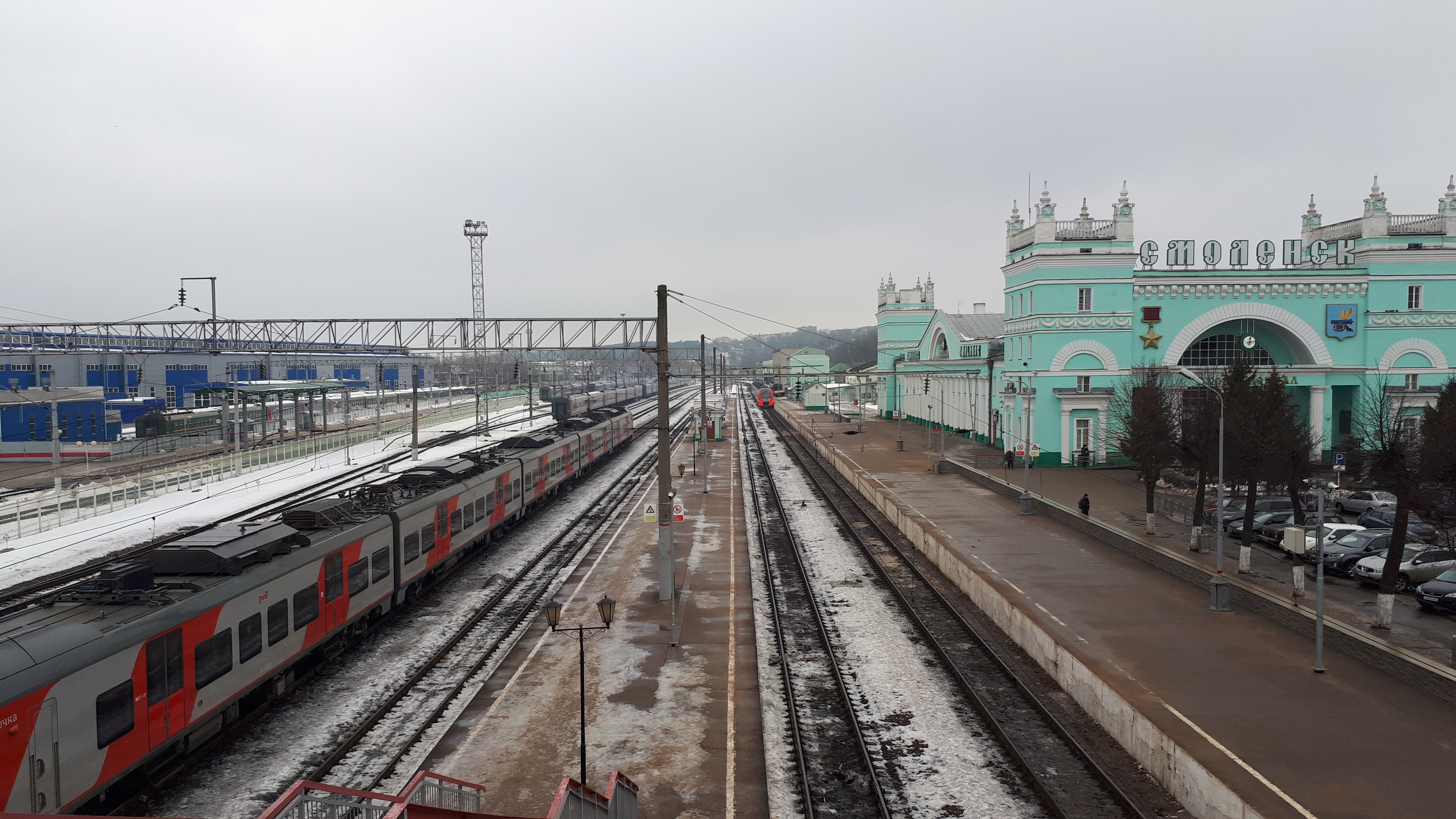
- Moscow–Brest railway at the Smolensk railway station.

Overview
- Native name: Московско-Брестская железная дорога
- Status: Operational
- Locale: Eastern Europe
- Termini: Brest-Tsentralny; Moscow Belorussky

Service
- Type: Inter-city rail; Commuter rail; Freight rail
- System: Moscow Railway (Moscow–Smolensk); Belarusian Railway (Orsha–Brest)
- Operator(s): Belarusian Railway; Russian Railways; Lithuanian Railways

History
- Opened: 20 September 1870
- Completed: 16 November 1871

Technical
- Line length: 1,100 km (680 mi)
- Track gauge: 1,520 mm (4 ft 11 27/32 in)
- Electrification: 25 kV 50 Hz AC–3 kV DC

The Moscow–Brest Railway (Russian: Московско-Брестская железная дорога) is about 1,100 km of Moscow Railway within Russian Railways and Belarusian Railway, that connects between Moscow in Russia and Brest near at the Polish border. It was built during the period of Imperial Russia.

== History ==
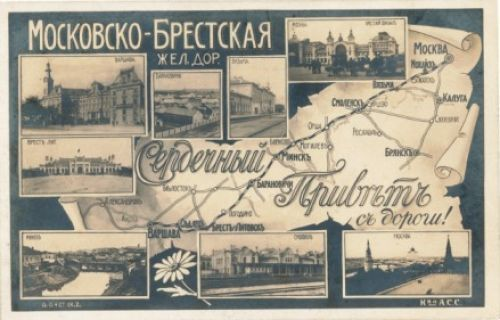
Railway map of the Moscow–Brest Railway in 1912

The construction of Moscow–Smolensk railway was approved by Alexander II On December 15, 1868. Construction began in the spring of 1869 with the construction of the Moscow Smolensk railway station at the Tverskaya Zastava Square. This railway was built simultaneously from Smolensk and from Moscow. On August 9, 1870, the first trains passed from Smolensk to Gzhatsk. On September 20, 1870, Moscow-Smolensk Railway was opened. In 1870–1871, the Smolensk-Brest railway was built, and this section was opened on November 16, 1871. Both railways merged into one and they were named the Moscow–Brest Railway. In 1877–1879, from Moscow to Kubinka, and from Smolensk to Brest became double-track sections. In 1891–1892, from Kubinka to Smolensk became a double-track section. Electrification began in 1941 and by 1973 between Moscow and Vyazma was electrified at 3,000 V direct current. In 1979 ahead of the Moscow Olympic Games the rest of the Vyazma–Brest was electrified at 50 Hz 25,000 V.

== Major stations ==
Moscow (Belorussky) - Vyazma - Smolensk - Orsha - Minsk - Stoŭbcy - Baranovichi - Brest

== In popular culture ==
The Moscow–Brest Railway plays a role in the novel Doctor Zhivago by Boris Pasternak.

== See also ==
- List of railway lines in Russia
