= Kutuzovskaya (Moscow Central Circle) =

Station on the Moscow Central Circle

Kutuzovskaya Кутузовская
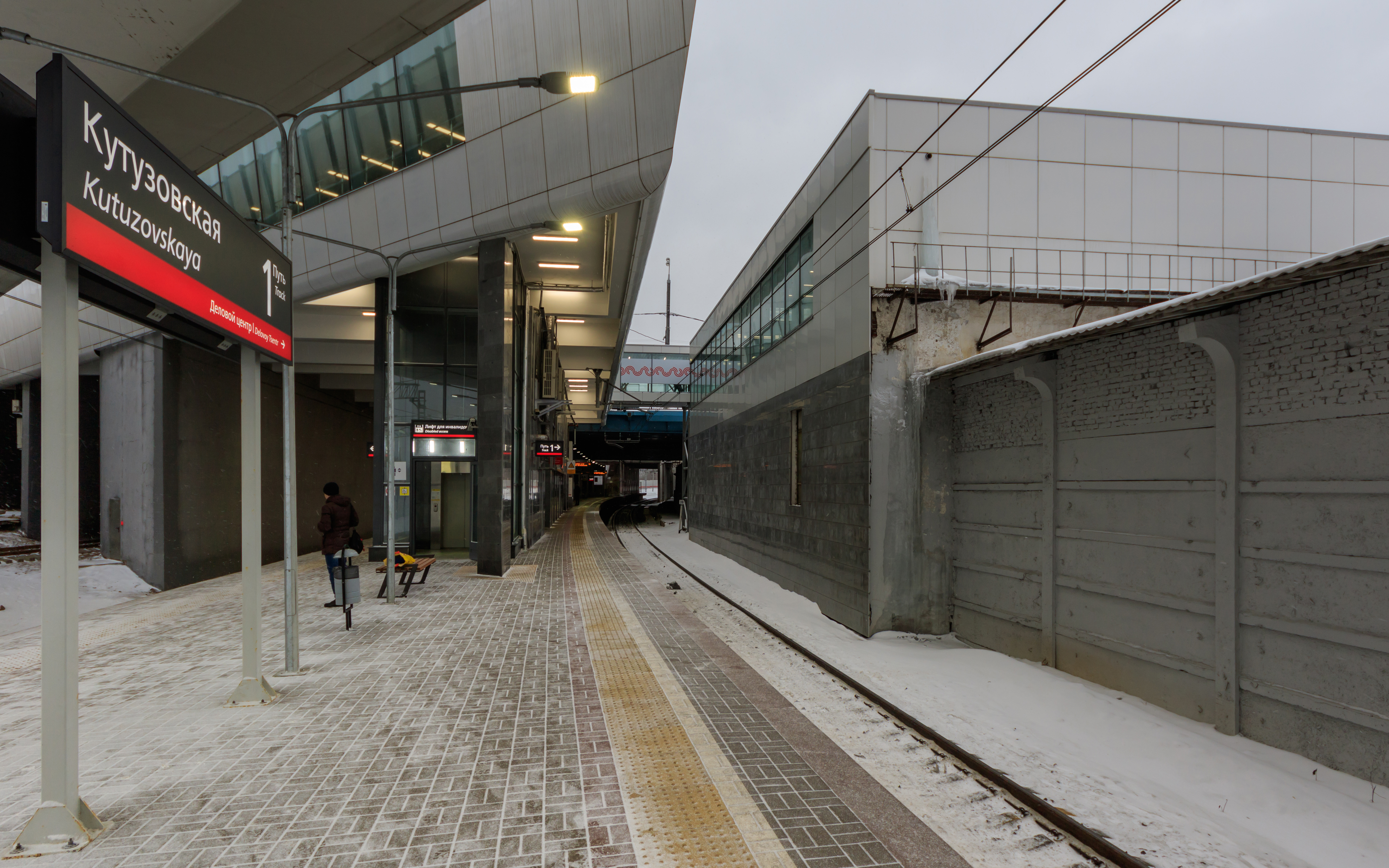

General information
- Coordinates: 55.7396°N 37.5344°E
- System: Moscow Metro
- Owner: Government of Moscow (MKZD)
- Operator: Russian Railways
- Line: Little Ring Railway
- Platforms: 2 side platforms
- Tracks: 2
- Train operators: Russian Railways

Construction
- Structure type: At-grade
- Cycle facilities: Yes
- Accessible: Yes

History
- Opened: 10 September 2016; 9 years ago

Services
Preceding station	Moscow Metro	Following station
Luzhniki anticlockwise / outer	Moscow Central Circle	Delovoy Tsentr clockwise / inner
Out-of-station interchange
Preceding station	Moscow Metro	Following station
Fili towards Kuntsevskaya	Filyovskaya line transfer at Kutuzovskaya	Studencheskaya towards Aleksandrovsky Sad
Location
- Location within Moscow Metro

Kutuzovskaya (Russian: Кутузовская) is a station on the Moscow Central Circle of the Moscow Metro that opened in September 2016.

== Name ==
Originally planned to be named Kutuzovo, the city altered the name slightly to Kutuzovskaya in concert with the connecting station Kutuzovskaya on Filyovskaya Line.

== Transfer ==
Passengers may make free out-of-station transfers to Kutuzovskaya station on the Filyovskaya Line. It is also possible to make a free transfer to the Arbatsko-Pokrovskaya Line and Kalininsko-Solntsevskaya Line at Park Pobedy; however, the distance of more than one kilometer makes this impractical.

== Gallery ==
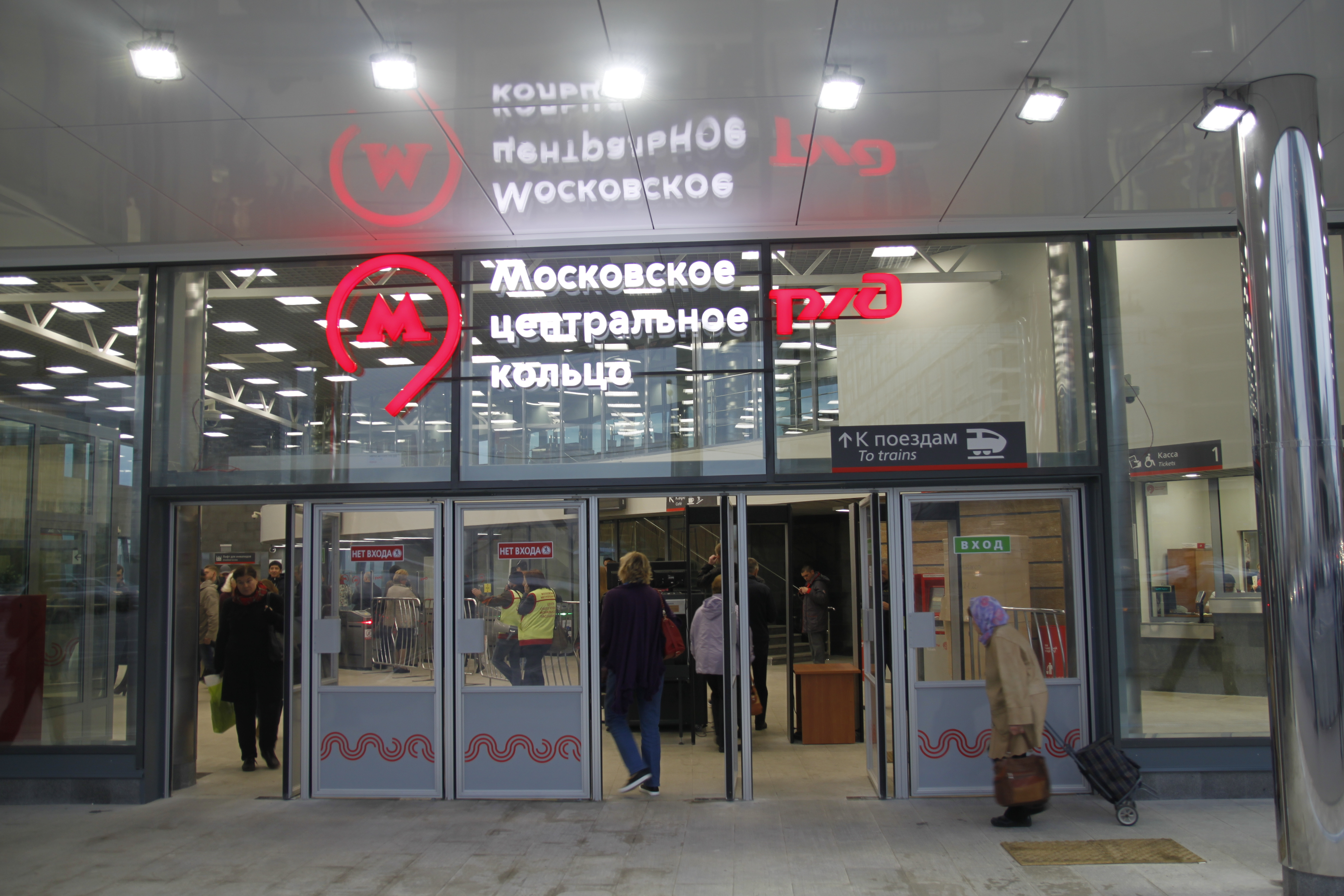

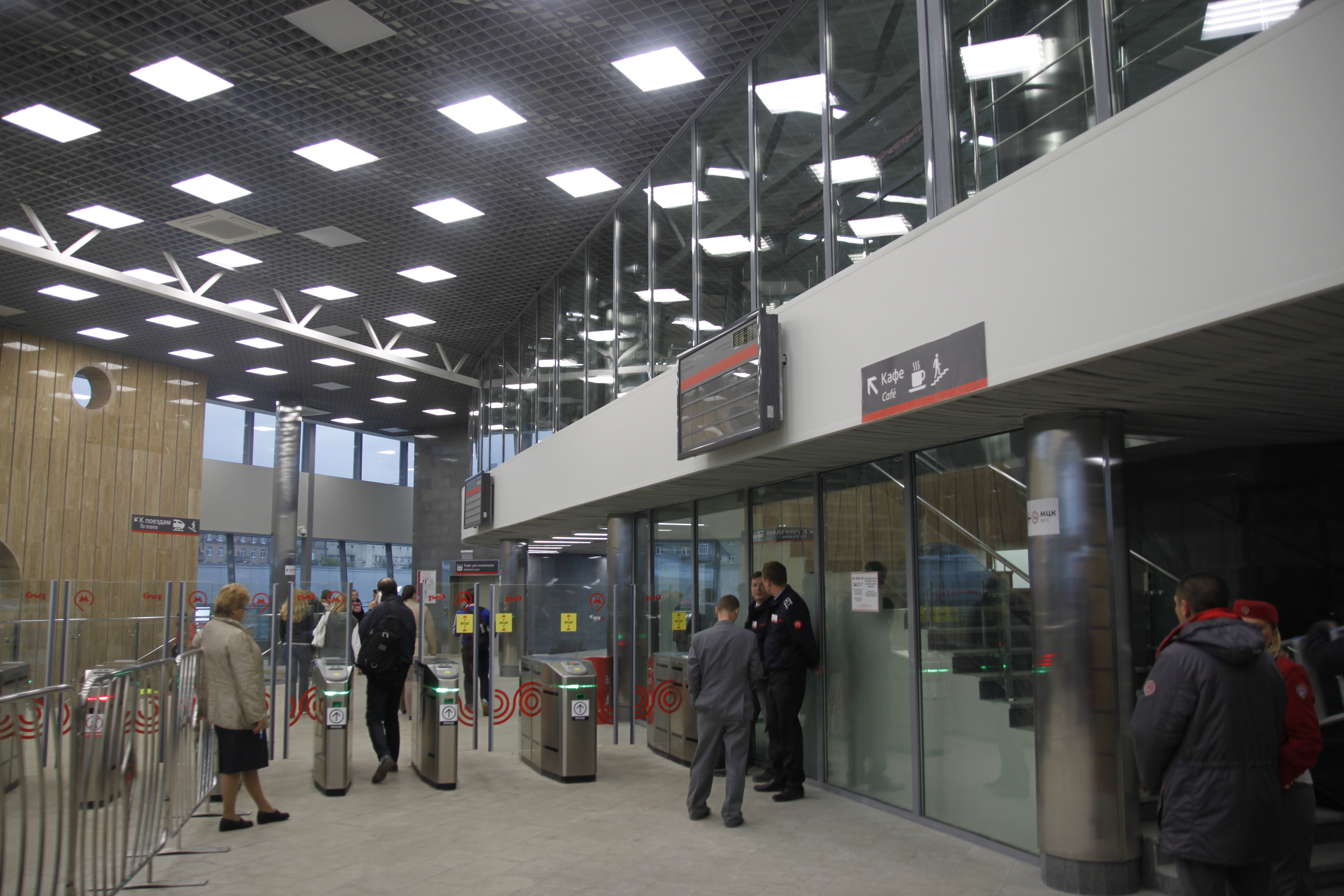

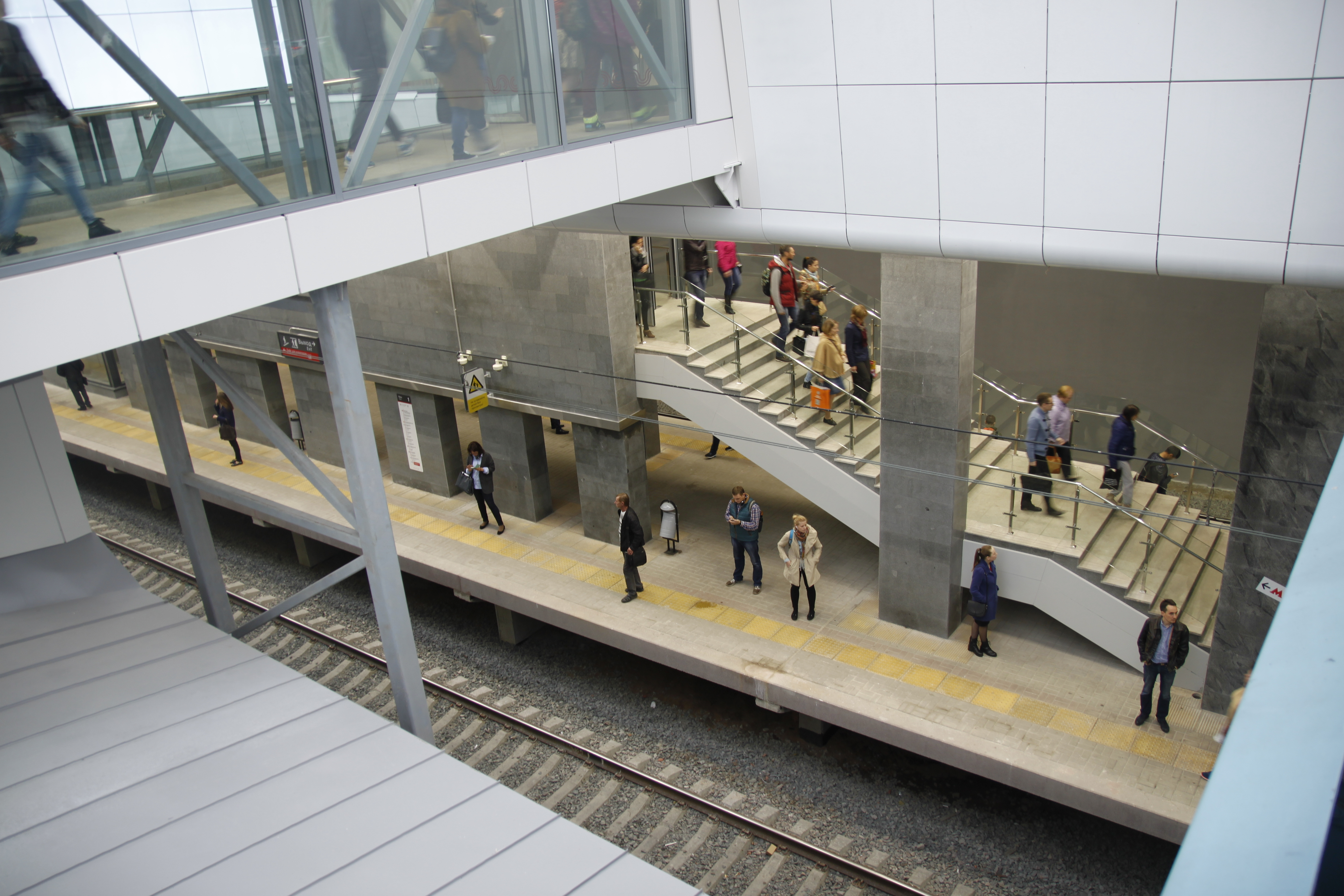

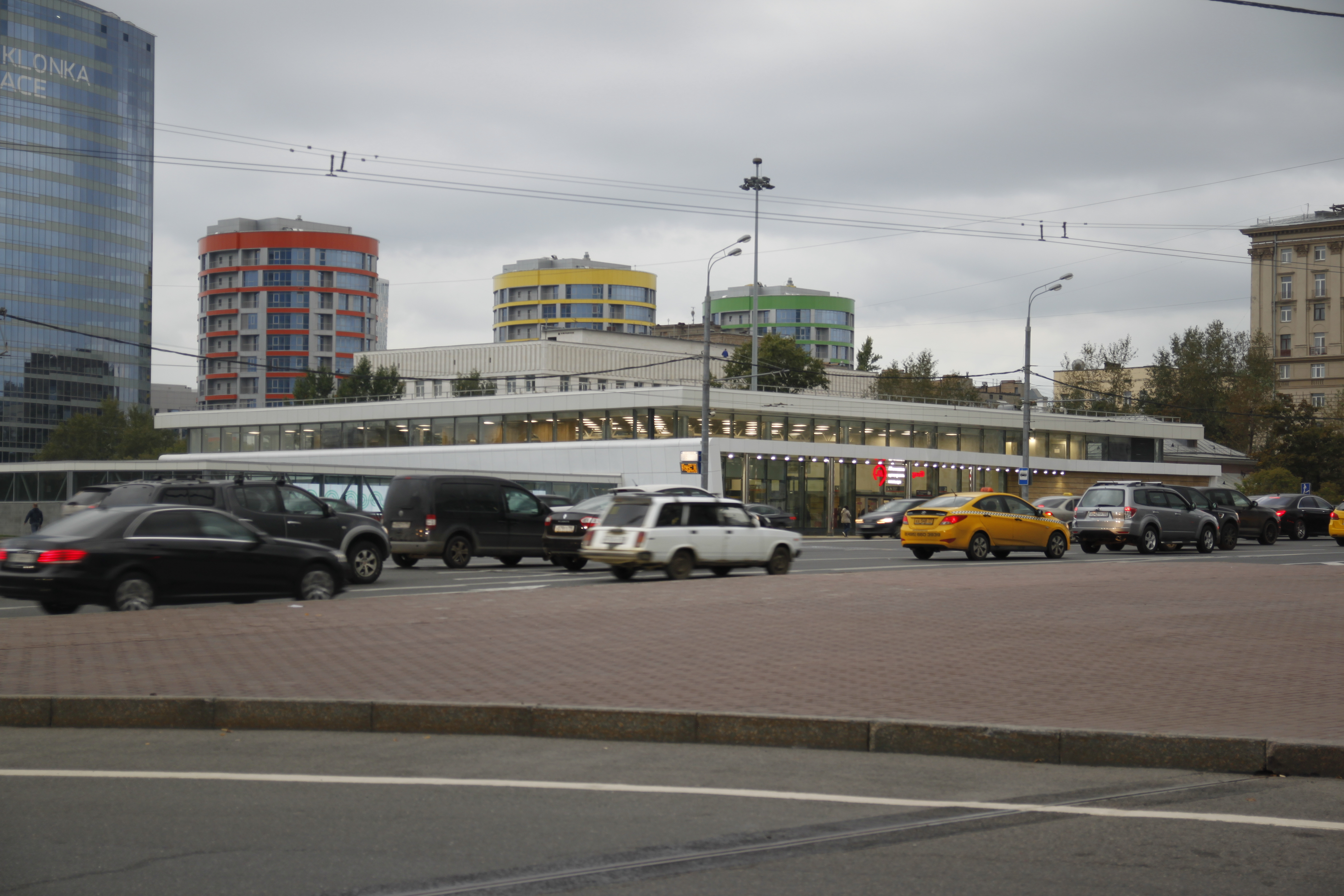
