= Smolensk railway station =

Railway station in Smolensk, Russia

Smolensk–Central Смоленск–Центральный
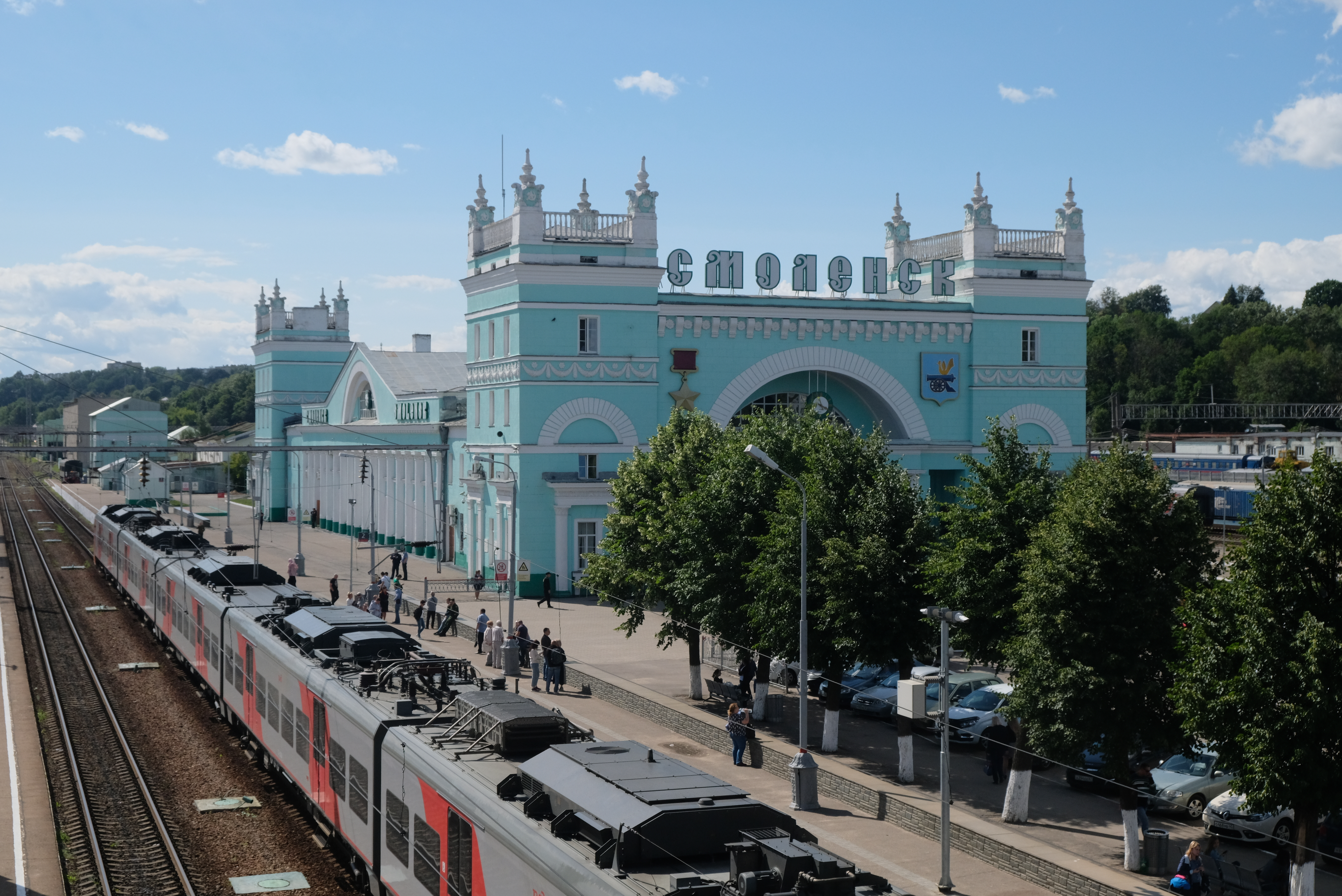
- Smolensk Railway Station

General information
- Location: Smolensk; Smolensk Oblast; Russia
- Coordinates: 54°47′52″N 32°02′04″E
- Owner: Russian Railways
- Platforms: 4
- Tracks: 22

Construction
- Structure type: At-grade

Other information
- Station code: 170108
- Fare zone: 0

History
- Opened: 1868

Services
Preceding station	Russian Railways	Following station
Orsha towards Brest	Moscow–Brest	Vyazma towards Moscow Belorussky
Location

Smolensk railway station is the primary passenger railway station for the city of Smolensk in Russia, and an important stop along the Moscow–Brest Railway.

== History ==
There were two buildings that stood parallel to each other and were connected by an arch with a clock. After the Great Patriotic War, the current railway station was built in 1949-1951. Architects were Boris Mezentsev and Mikhail Shpotov.

The first train that arrived in Smolensk was from Vitebsk (Belarus).

== Trains ==
- Moscow — Smolensk
- Moscow — Minsk
- Moscow — Brest
- Moscow — Warsaw
- Moscow — Prague
- Moscow — Berlin
- Moscow — Kaliningrad
- Novosibirsk — Minsk
