= Moscow Belorussky railway station =

Railway station in Moscow, Russia

Coordinates: 55°46′35″N 37°34′49″E

Moscow–Belorussky Москва–Белорусская
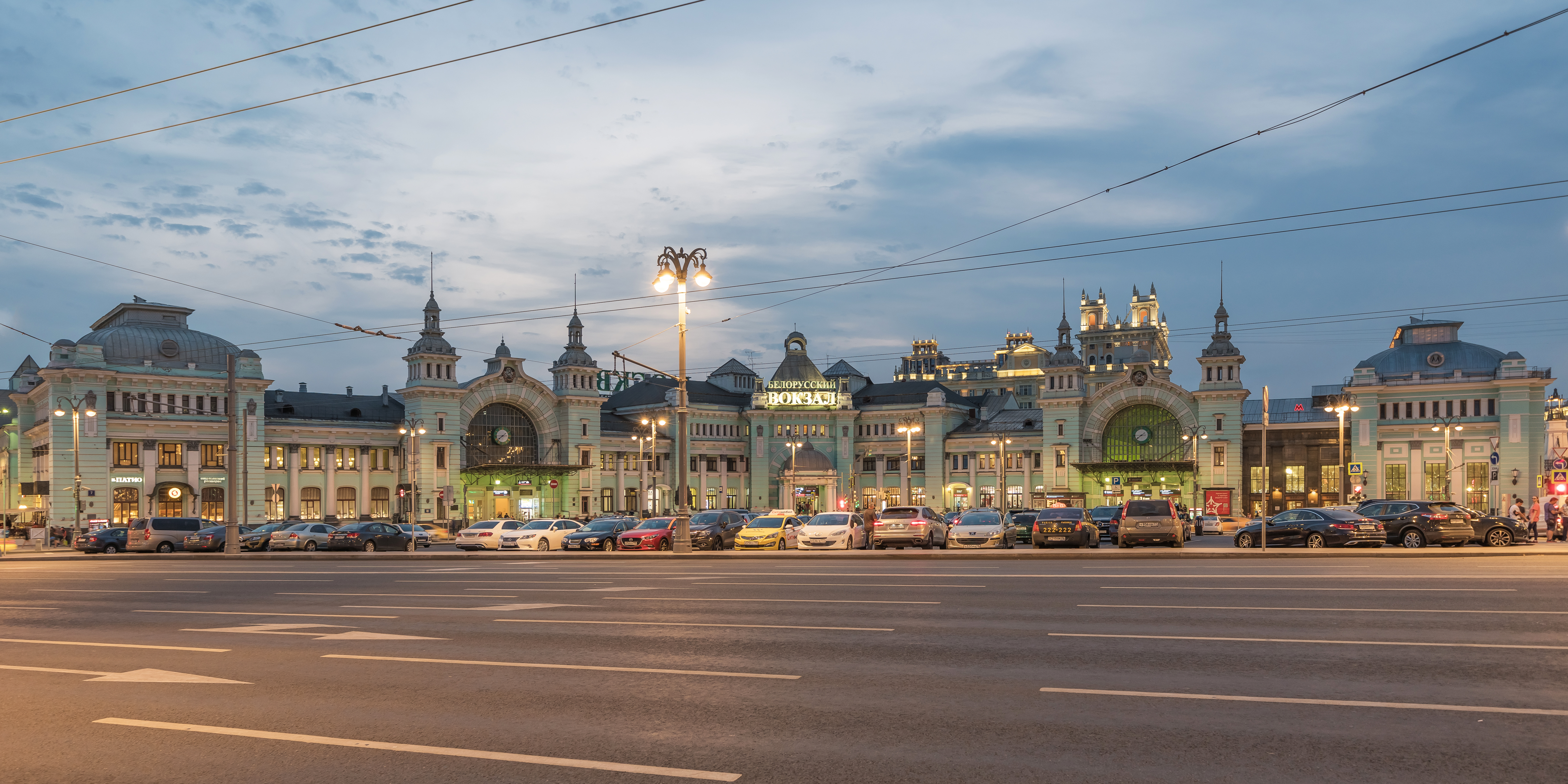
- View of the station from Tverskaya Zastava Square

General information
- Location: 7 Tverskaya Zastava Square, Moscow; Russia
- Owner: Russian Railways
- Operator: Moscow Railway
- Platforms: 7
- Tracks: 14
- Train operators: Russian Railways; Belarusian Railways
- Connections: Moscow Metro: Bus: M1, H1, T18, T78, 12, 27, 82, 84, 101, 116, 456, 904, 905 Tram: 7, 9

Construction
- Parking: Yes
- Accessible: Yes
- Architect: Ivan Strukov
- Architectural style: Neoclassical

Other information
- Station code: 198230
- Fare zone: 0

History
- Opened: 19 September 1870
- Rebuilt: 1907–1912
- Former names: Smolensky

Services
Preceding station	Russian Railways	Following station
Begovaya towards Gagarin	Belorussky Suburban	Terminus
Vyazma towards Brest	Moscow–Brest	Terminus
Preceding station	Moscow Central Diameters	Following station
Begovaya towards Odintsovo	Line D1	Savyolovskaya towards Lobnya
Preceding station	Aeroexpress	Following station
Begovaya towards Odintsovo	Odintsovo to Sheremetyevo Airport	Savyolovskaya towards Aeroport Sheremetyevo
Location
- Location within Moscow Ring Road

Belorussky railway station (Russian: Белору́сский вокза́л, IPA: [bʲɪɫɐˈruskʲɪj vɐɡˈzaɫ]) also referred to as Moscow–Passenger–Smolenskaya (Russian: Москва́-Пассажирская-Смоле́нская, lit. 'Moskva-Smolenskaya'), Informally the whole station can be called as Moscow Belorusskaya (Russian: Москва Белорусская, lit. 'Moskva Belorusskaya'), is a railway terminal of the Moscow Railway located at the front of Tverskaya Zastava Square in Central Administrative Okrug, Moscow. The station is one of nine railway terminals of Moscow. It was opened in 1870 and rebuilt in its current form in 1907–1912.

== Operations ==
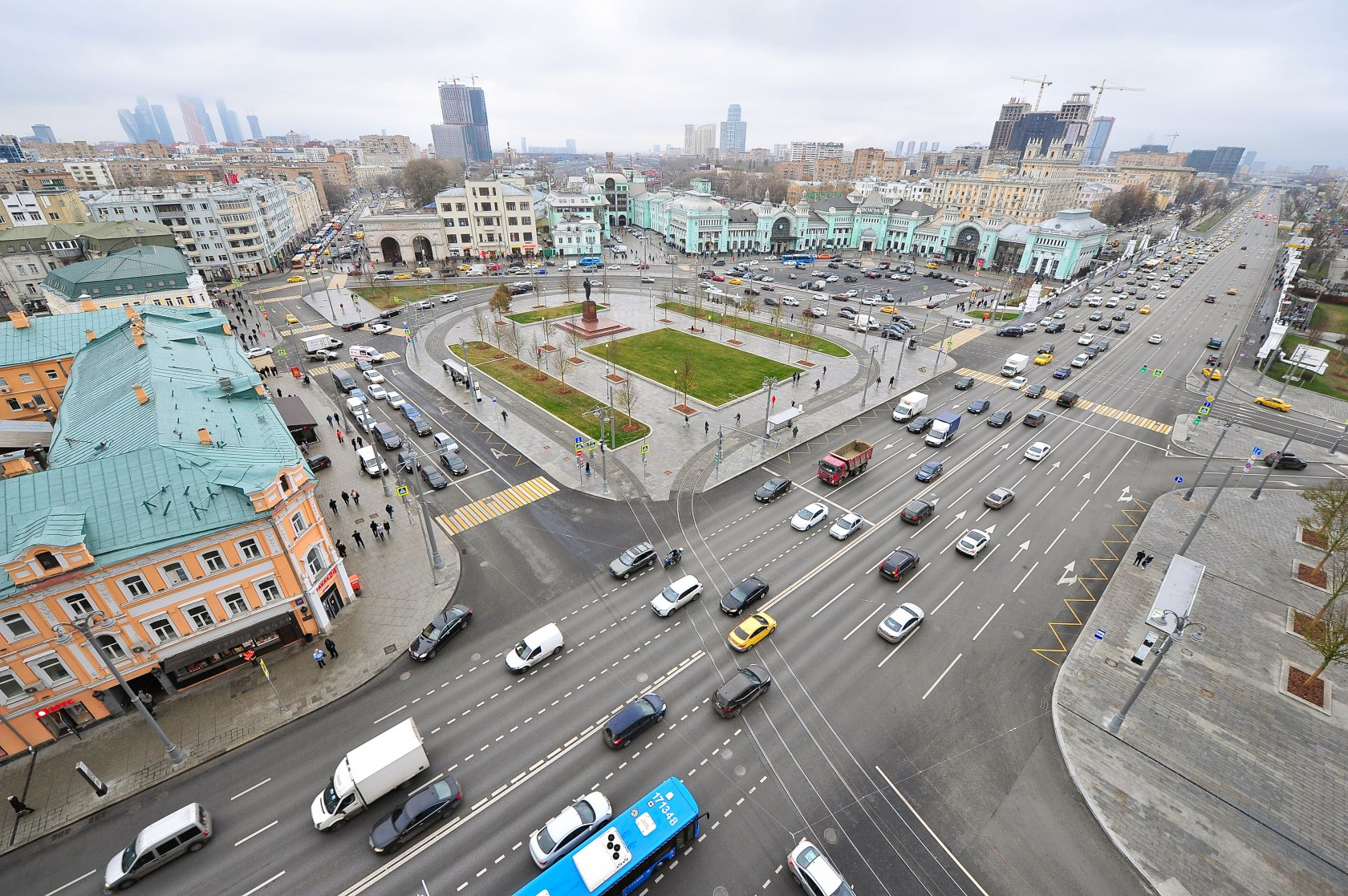
Tverskaya Zastava Square is right in front of Belorussky railway station (in the background on the right).

Belorussky railway station serves long distance trains to regions west and south-west of Moscow, and one train each to the north-east (on the Savyolovsky branch to Rybinsk with continuing service to Uglich, Vesegonsk, and Pestovo) and to the south (to Anapa through Tula, Kursk, Voronezh, and Rostov-on-Don). The station also serves local commuter trains (Belorussky suburban railway line and Line D1 of Moscow Central Diameters) to Usovo, Odintsovo, Golitsyno, Kubinka I, Mozhaisk (including express service), Borodino, and Zvenigorod as well as the Aeroexpress service to Sheremetyevo Airport.

The station is not entirely a terminus station. A transit line continues on the Alekseevskaya Line. In addition, the station provides through service to Savyolovsky (Savyolovsky suburban railway line and Line D1 of Moscow Central Diameters) and Kursky stations. Until 18 May 2015 a suburban train service also continued to Gagarin, and until the end of 2012 to Vyazma. Now the farthest station of commuter train service on this line is Mozhaisk. Approximately 1500 passengers per hour use Belorussky station.

Belorussky railway station is included in the Moscow Regional Directorate of the Directorate of railway stations. This station is part of the Moscow–Smolensk unit of DTSS-3, Moscow Directorate of Rail Traffic Control.

== History ==
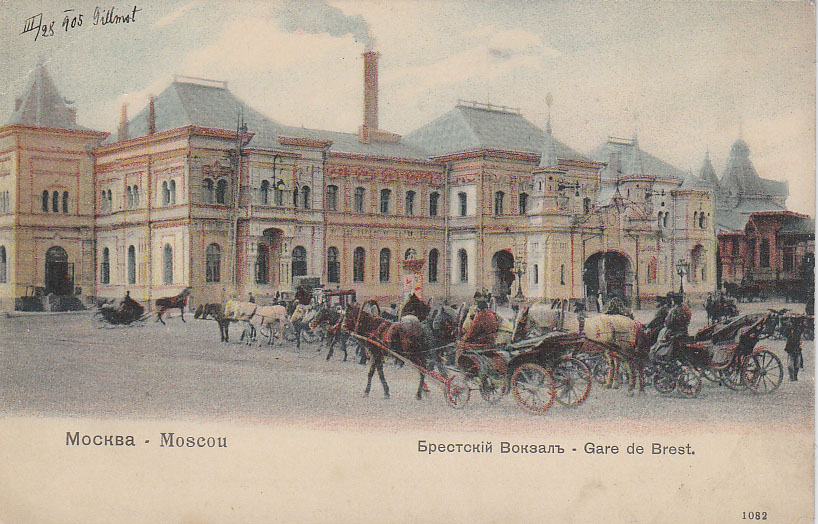
Historical view of the station (1905)

Construction of the railway from Moscow to Smolensk, and then to Minsk and Warsaw, started in the second half of the 1860s. Construction of the station, known as Smolensky, began in late April 1869. A grand opening of the Moscow–Smolensk railway took place on 19 September 1870, the station became the sixth in Moscow. In November 1871 after the extension of the railway to Belorussia, the station was renamed Belorussky Station. On 15 May 1910, the right wing of the new station opened, and on 26 February 1912, the left wing opened. The station was designed by architect Ivan Strukov. On 4 May 1912, the railway was renamed the Alexander Railway, the station was renamed Alexander Station. In August 1922, Alexander and the Moscow-Baltic railways were merged into the Moscow-Belorussia-Baltic, so the station was renamed Belorussian-Baltic station. In May 1936, after yet another reorganization of the railways, the station received its present name – Belorussky Station.

== Aeroexpress ==
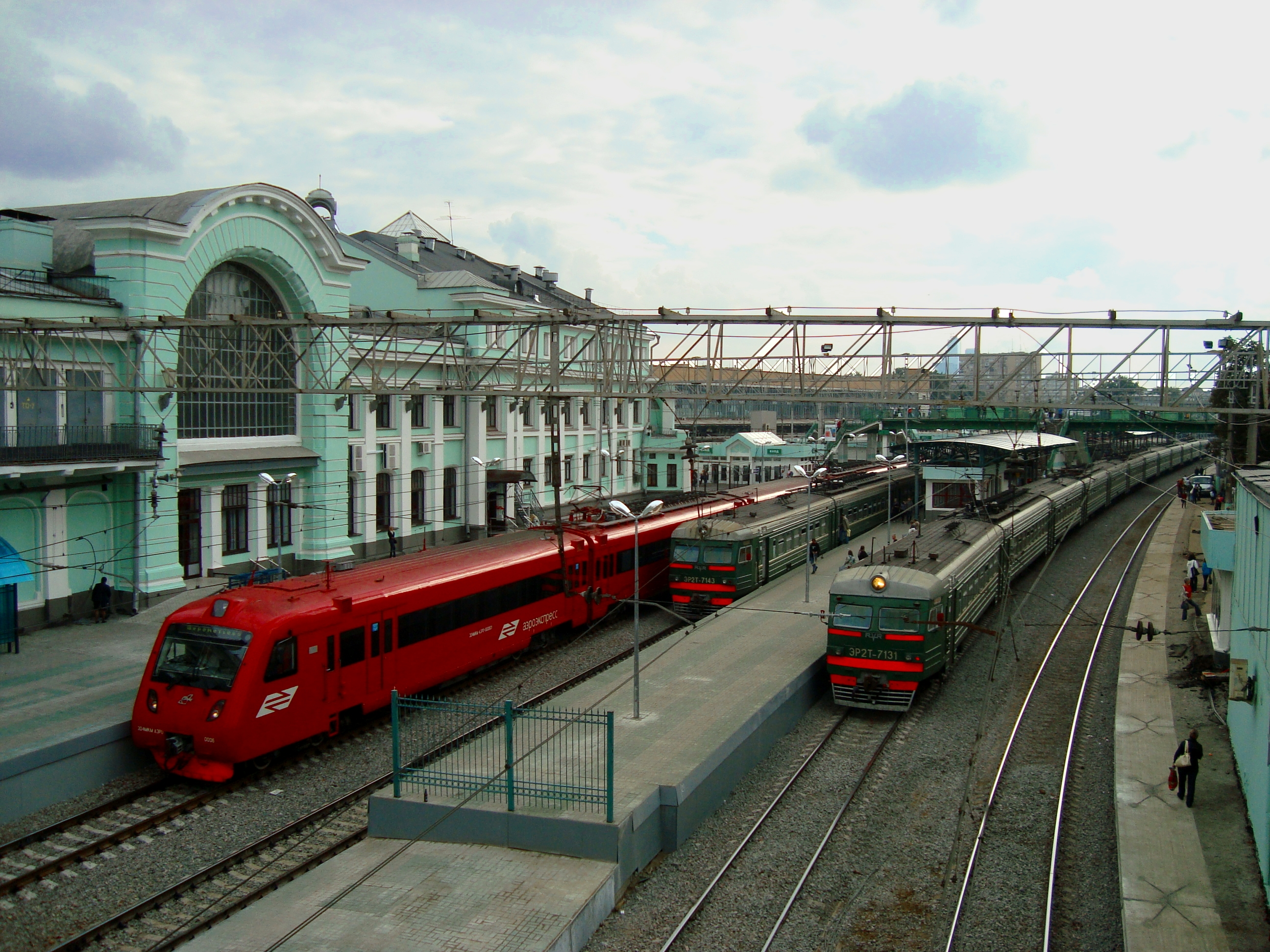
Suburban platforms of Belorussky Rail Terminal also showing Aeroexpress platform.

In September 2007 OAO "Aeroexpress" began the reconstruction of the rail link to Sheremetyevo Airport. The cost of reconstruction at the Belorussky station was estimated at US$7.7 million and involved the construction of a new terminal, which has become one of the main links in rail traffic between Moscow and the airport. The new Belorussky terminal is located in the fourth hall of the railway station and occupies an area of 600 square metres (6,500 sq ft) Passengers departing from Sheremetyevo can check in for flights using the self-service kiosks. The terminal was opened on 27 August 2009.

In June 2008 construction of a new railway terminal complex at Sheremetyevo was completed. New purpose-built rolling stock, the electric ED4MKM-Aero developed by ZAO "Transmashholding" serves the line.

Baggage check-in at the city terminal was abolished on 1 December 2010 in connection with the sharp increase in the number of passengers. The one-way cost of the trip is 500 rubles (1000 rubles for business class).

== Trains and destinations ==
=== Long distance ===
Train number	Train name	Destination	Operated by
001/002	Belarus (bel, rus: Беларусь)	(Belarus) Minsk (Main)	(Belarus) Belarusian Railways
003/004	Minsk (bel: Мінск, rus: Минск)	(Belarus) Minsk (Main)	(Belarus) Belarusian Railways
009/010	Polonez (pol: Polonez, rus: Полонез)	(Poland) Warsaw (Zachodnia)	(Poland) Polish State Railways (Russia) Russian Railways
013/014	Strizh (rus: Стриж)	(Germany) Berlin (HBF)	(Russia) Russian Railways
017/018	Riviera Express	(France) Nice (Ville)	(Russia) Russian Railways
021/022	Vltava (cz: Vltava, rus: Влтава)	(Czech Republic) Prague (Hlavní)	(Russia) Russian Railways
023/024	EuroNight	(France) Paris (Gare de l'Est)	(Russia) Russian Railways
025/026	Svislach (bel: Свіслач, rus: Свислочь)	(Belarus) Minsk (Main)	(Belarus) Belarusian Railways
027/028	Bug (bel: Буг, rus: Буг)	(Belarus) Brest	(Belarus) Belarusian Railways
029/030	Yantar (rus: Янтарь)	(Russia) Kaliningrad (cars: (Lithuania) Vilnius)	(Russia) Russian Railways (Lithuania) Lithuanian Railways
033/034	Smolensk (rus: Смоленск)	(Russia) Smolensk (Main)	(Russia) Russian Railways
039/040	Dzvina (bel: Дзвіна, rus: Двина)	(Belarus) Polotsk	(Belarus) Belarusian Railways
055/056	Sozh (bel, rus: Сож)	(Belarus) Gomel (cars: (Belarus) Salihorsk, (Belarus) Mahilyow)	(Belarus) Belarusian Railways
061/062		(Russia) Velikiye Luki	(Russia) Russian Railways
063А/064А		(Russia) Pskov	(Russia) Russian Railways
063Б/064Б		(Belarus) Minsk (cars: (Belarus) Brest) (Russia) Novosibirsk	(Belarus) Belarusian Railways
077/078	Nyoman (bel: Нёман, rus: Неман)	(Belarus) Grodno	(Belarus) Belarusian Railways
133/134		(Belarus) Minsk (cars: (Belarus) Brest) (Russia) Arkhangelsk	(Belarus) Belarusian Railways
601/602	Rybinsk (rus: Рыбинск)	(Russia) Rybinsk (cars: (Russia) Vesyegonsk, (Russia) Pestovo, (Russia) Uglich)	(Russia) Russian Railways
717/718 721/722	Lastochka (rus: Ласточка)	(Belarus) Minsk (Main)	(Russia) Russian Railways
715/716 731/732 733/734 735/736 743/744	Lastochka (rus: Ласточка)	(Russia) Smolensk (Main)	(Russia) Russian Railways

=== Other destinations ===
Country	Destinations
Austria	Innsbruck, Wien (Westbahnhof)
Belarus	Mahilyow, Vitebsk
Czech Republic	Ostrava
Germany	Frankfurt (Main)
Italy	Milan (Rogoredo)
Monaco	Monaco
Poland	Katowice, Poznań
Russia	Yaroslavl, Nizhny Novgorod, Yekaterinburg, Omsk

=== Suburban destinations ===
Suburban commuter trains (elektrichka) connect Belorussky station with the towns of Barvikha, Usovo, Odintsovo, Golitsyno, Zvenigorod, Kubinka, Mozhaysk.

Some suburban commuter trains (elektrichka) also proceed to Savyolovsky Rail Terminal to the Savyolovo direction destinations (Dolgoprudny, Lobnya, Nekrasovsky, Iksha, Dmitrov, Taldom, Dubna) and to Kursky Rail Terminal to Kursk direction destinations (Shcherbinka, Podolsk, Serpukhov).

=== Airport connections ===
Belorussky station is connected to Savyolovsky Rail Terminal (before 30 May 2010) and Sheremetyevo International Airport by Aeroexpress trains.

== Cultural references ==
- A film "Belorussky station" was created in 1970 by Andrei Smirnov.
