= Triumphal Arch of Moscow =

Monument commemorating Russia's victory over Napoleon

Coordinates: 55°44′12.3″N 37°31′11.7″E

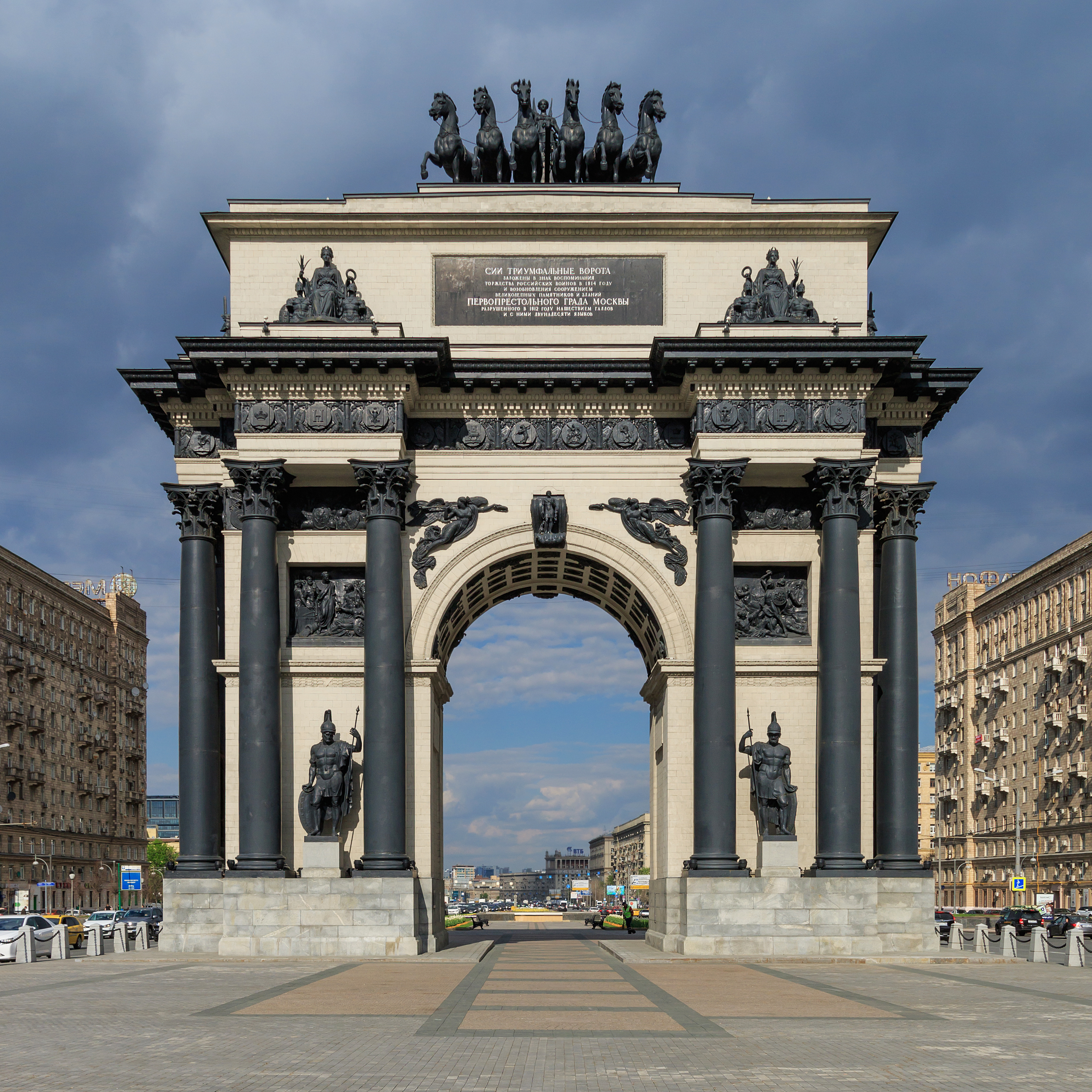
The Triumphal Gate on Victory Square, 2017

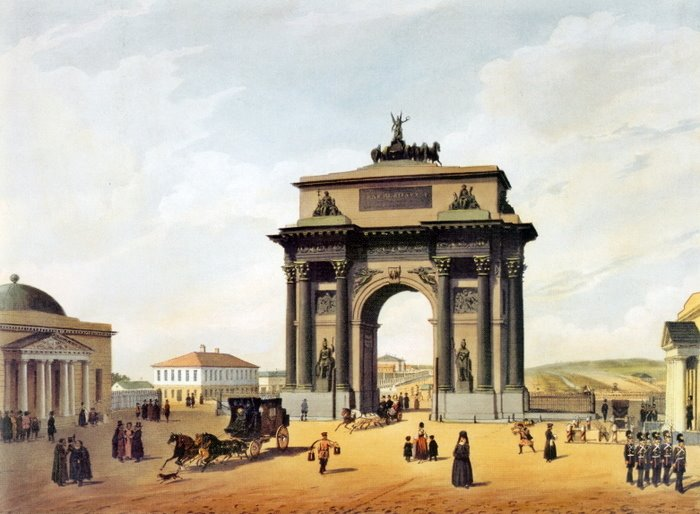
The original Triumphal Gate on Tverskaya Zastava Square, 1848, by Félix Benoist

The third and the oldest surviving triumphal arch in Moscow was built in 1829–1834 on Tverskaya Zastava Square to Joseph Bové's designs in order to commemorate Russia's victory over Napoleon during the French invasion of Russia in 1812. It replaced an earlier wooden structure built by the veterans of the Napoleonic Wars in 1814.

The arch was built in brick and lined with ashlar. The columns and statues were of cast iron. A seiuga (six-horse chariot) was designed by Giovanni Vitali. The bilingual inscription in Russian and Latin ran as follows:

To the blessed memory of Alexander I who raised from ashes and adorned with many memorials of paternal care this former capital that had been committed to the mercy of fire during the invasion of the Gauls and twelve other nations.

The arch was dismantled in 1936 as part of Joseph Stalin's reconstruction of downtown Moscow. Vitali's sculptures were then put on exhibit at an architectural museum on the grounds of the former Donskoy Monastery. After the Second World War, there were plans to rebuild the structure in front of the Belorussky railway station.

The current arch was built to Bove's original designs in 1966–1968 in the middle of Kutuzovsky Avenue (the prospekt was named after Marshall Mikhail Kutuzov who led Russia to victory over Napoleon in 1812), close to the Victory Park. An open space surrounding the arch is known as the Victory Square.

== See also ==
- List of post-Roman triumphal arches
