= Usovo =

Usovo (Russian: Усово) is the name of several rural localities in Russia.

== Modern localities ==
=== Arkhangelsk Oblast ===
As of 2023, one rural locality in the Arkhangelsk Oblast bears this name:

- Usovo, Arkhangelsk Oblast, a village in Zabelinsky Selsoviet of Kotlassky District

=== Ivanovo Oblast ===
As of 2023, one rural locality in the Ivanovo Oblast bears this name:

- Usovo, Ivanovo Oblast, a village in Puchezhsky District

=== Kaluga Oblast ===
As of 2023, one rural locality in the Kaluga Oblast bears this name:

- Usovo, Kaluga Oblast, a village in Kozelsky District

=== Moscow Oblast ===
As of 2023, one rural locality in the Moscow Oblast bears this name:

- Usovo, Moscow Oblast, a selo in the Barvikhinskoye Rural Settlement of Odintsovsky District; 55°44′N 37°12′E

=== Oryol Oblast ===
As of 2023, one rural locality in the Oryol Oblast bears this name:

- Usovo, Oryol Oblast, a village in Lomovsky Selsoviet of Zalegoshchensky District

=== Pskov Oblast ===
As of 2023, five rural localities in the Pskov Oblast bear this name:

- Usovo, Krasnogorodsky District, Pskov Oblast, a village in the Krasnogorodsky District
- Usovo, Nevelsky District, Pskov Oblast, a village in the Nevelsky District
- Usovo (Gorayskaya Rural Settlement), Ostrovsky District, Pskov Oblast, a village in the Ostrovsky District; municipally, a part of the Gorayskaya Rural Settlement of that district
- Usovo (Berezhanskaya Rural Settlement), Ostrovsky District, Pskov Oblast, a village in the Ostrovsky District; municipally, a part of Berezhanskaya Rural Settlement of that district
- Usovo, Sebezhsky District, Pskov Oblast, a village in the Sebezhsky District

=== Rostov Oblast ===
As of 2023, one rural locality in Rostov Oblast bears this name:

- Usovo, Rostov Oblast, a settlement in the Sulinskoye Rural Settlement of Millerovsky District

=== Tambov Oblast ===
As of 2023, one rural locality in the Tambov Oblast bears this name:

- Usovo, Tambov Oblast, a village in the Grazhdanovsky Selsoviet of Bondarsky District

=== Tver Oblast ===
As of 2023, two rural localities in the Tver Oblast bear this name:

- Usovo, Kimrsky District, Tver Oblast, a village in the Ustinovskoye Rural Settlement of Kimrsky District
- Usovo, Rzhevsky District, Tver Oblast, a village in the Itomlya Rural Settlement of Rzhevsky District

=== Tyumen Oblast ===
As of 2023, one rural locality in the Tyumen Oblast bears this name:

- Usovo, Tyumen Oblast, a selo in the Usovsky Rural Okrug of Sladkovsky District

=== Vologda Oblast ===
As of 2023, two rural localities in the Vologda Oblast bear this name:

- Usovo, Spassky Selsoviet, Vologodsky District, Vologda Oblast, a village in Spassky Selsoviet of Vologodsky District
- Usovo, Veprevsky Selsoviet, Vologodsky District, Vologda Oblast, a village in the Veprevsky Selsoviet of Vologodsky District

=== Yaroslavl Oblast ===
As of 2023, three rural localities in the Yaroslavl Oblast bear this name:

- Usovo, Danilovsky District, Yaroslavl Oblast, a village in the Gorinsky Rural Okrug of the Danilovsky District
- Usovo, Nekouzsky Rural Okrug, Nekouzsky District, Yaroslavl Oblast, a village in the Nekouzsky Rural Okrug of the Nekouzsky District
- Usovo, Shestikhinsky Rural Okrug, Nekouzsky District, Yaroslavl Oblast, a village in the Shestikhinsky Rural Okrug of the Nekouzsky District

== Alternative names ==
- Usovo, alternative name of Usovka, a village in the Andreyevsky Selsoviet of Sergachsky District in Nizhny Novgorod Oblast; 55°37′N 45°44′E
