= Kutuzovskaya (Filyovskaya line) =

Moscow Metro station

Kutuzovskaya Кутузовская
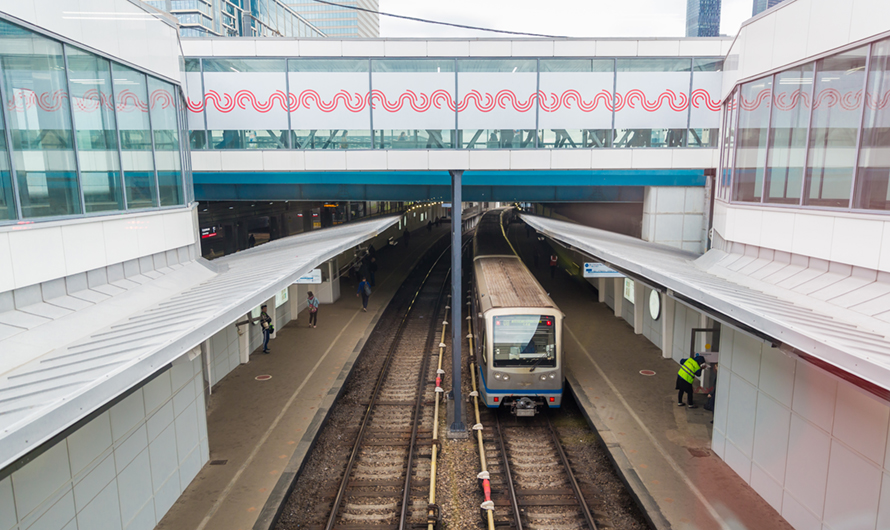

General information
- Location: Dorogomilovo District; Western Administrative Okrug; Moscow; Russia
- Coordinates: 55.7399°N 37.5344°E
- System: Moscow Metro station
- Owner: Moskovsky Metropoliten
- Line: Filyovskaya line
- Platforms: 2 side platforms
- Tracks: 2

Construction
- Structure type: Ground-level, open
- Platform levels: 1
- Parking: No

Other information
- Station code: 059

History
- Opened: 7 November 1958; 67 years ago

Services
Preceding station	Moscow Metro	Following station
Fili towards Kuntsevskaya	Filyovskaya line	Studencheskaya towards Aleksandrovsky Sad
Out-of-station interchange
Luzhniki anticlockwise / outer	Moscow Central Circle transfer at Kutuzovskaya	Delovoy Tsentr clockwise / inner
Route map
Location
- Location within Moscow Metro

Kutuzovskaya (Russian: Кутузовская) is a station of the Moscow Metro system in Moscow, Russia. It was completed in 1958 as the first westward extension of the newly created Filyovskaya line, which also included the reopening of four older stations which had been closed since 1953. Kutuzovskaya was the first permanent grade-level Metro station, part of a cost-cutting experiment which was ultimately doomed by Moscow's harsh climate. Kutuzovskaya's side platforms and curving layout are both unusual features. A large percentage of both platforms is covered by Kutuzovskiy Prospekt, an avenue which crosses over the station midway along its length. Entrance vestibules on either side of the overpass allow passengers to change platforms.

Kutuzovskaya was designed by Yuriy Zenkevich and Robert Pogrebnoi.

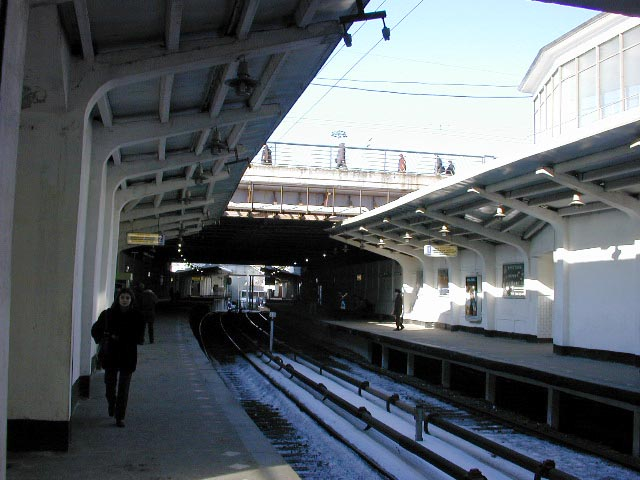
Kutuzovskaya
