= Fili (Moscow Metro) =

Moscow Metro station

Fili Фили
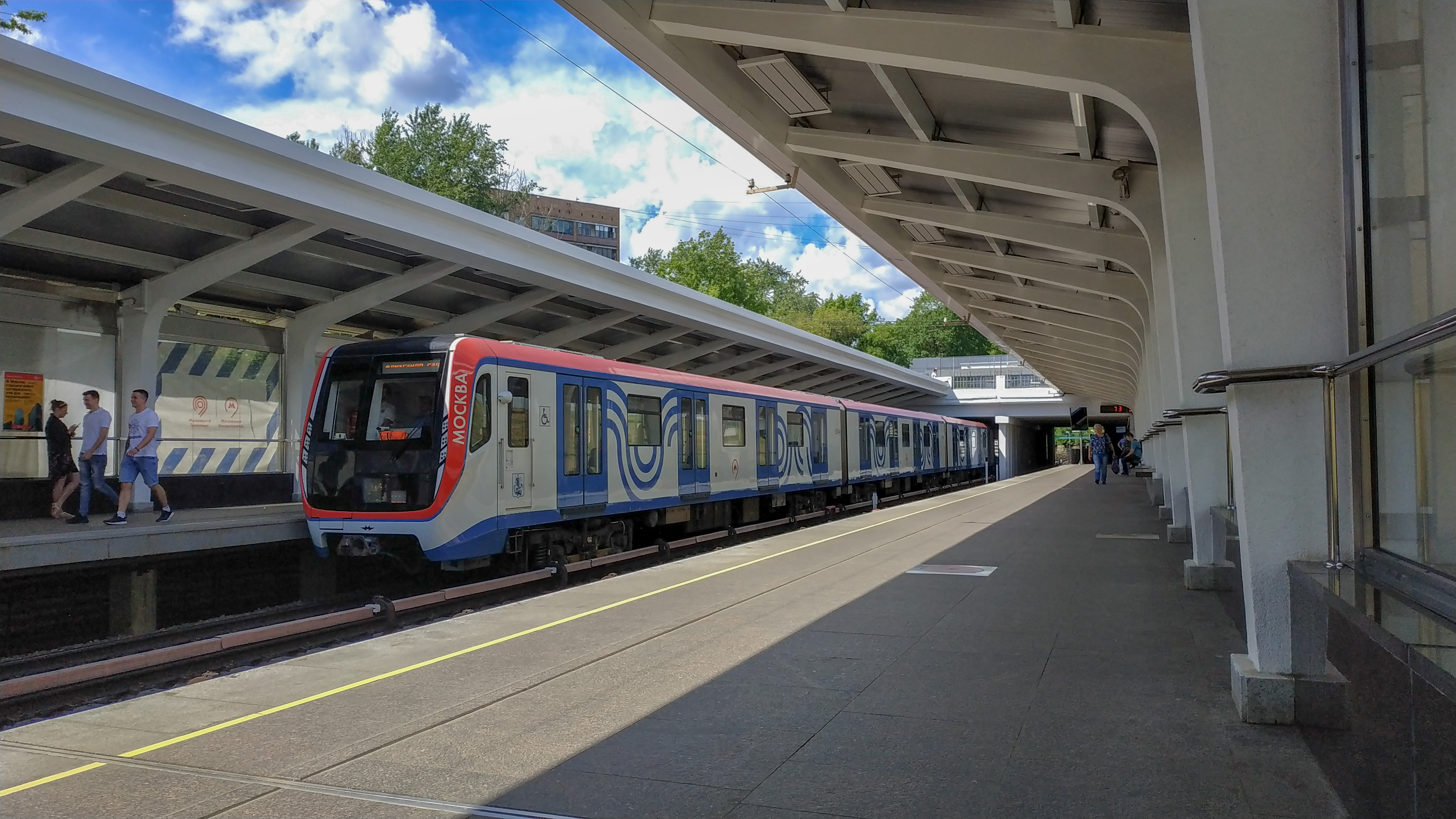
- Station after reconstruction

General information
- Location: Filyovsky Park District; Western Administrative Okrug; Moscow; Russia
- Coordinates: 55.7460°N 37.5150°E
- System: Moscow Metro station
- Owner: Moskovsky Metropoliten
- Line: Filyovskaya line
- Platforms: 2 side platforms
- Tracks: 2

Construction
- Structure type: Ground-level, open
- Platform levels: 1
- Parking: No

Other information
- Station code: 060

History
- Opened: 7 November 1959; 66 years ago

Services
Preceding station	Moscow Metro	Following station
Bagrationovskaya towards Kuntsevskaya	Filyovskaya line	Kutuzovskaya towards Aleksandrovsky Sad
Route map
Location
- Location within Moscow Metro

Fili (Russian: Фили) is a surface-level station on the Filyovskaya Line of the Moscow Metro. The station was opened on 7 November 1959, as the last surface side platform station on the line. The dual platforms are protected by canopies and are intersected at either end by road overpasses that provide additional shelter for waiting passengers. Two glazed upper-level entrance vestibule at both ends of the station allow passengers to change platforms. Robert Pogrebnoi and Yuriy Zenkevich were the main architects for the station's design. Daily passenger volume is approximately 30,100.

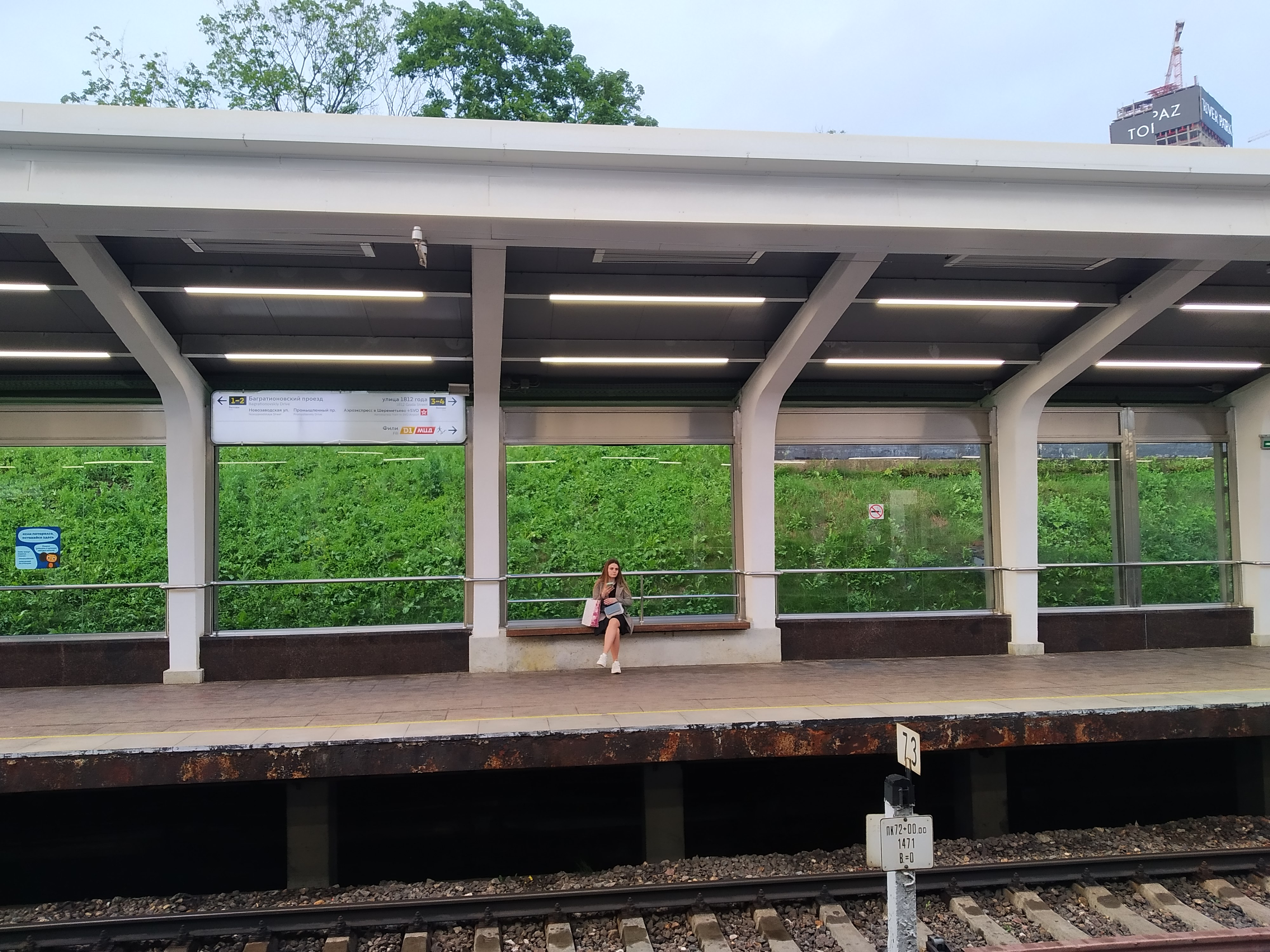
Fili (Moscow Metro) 20240618 201535
