= Alexander Garden =

Urban public park in Moscow, Russia

- Александровский сад
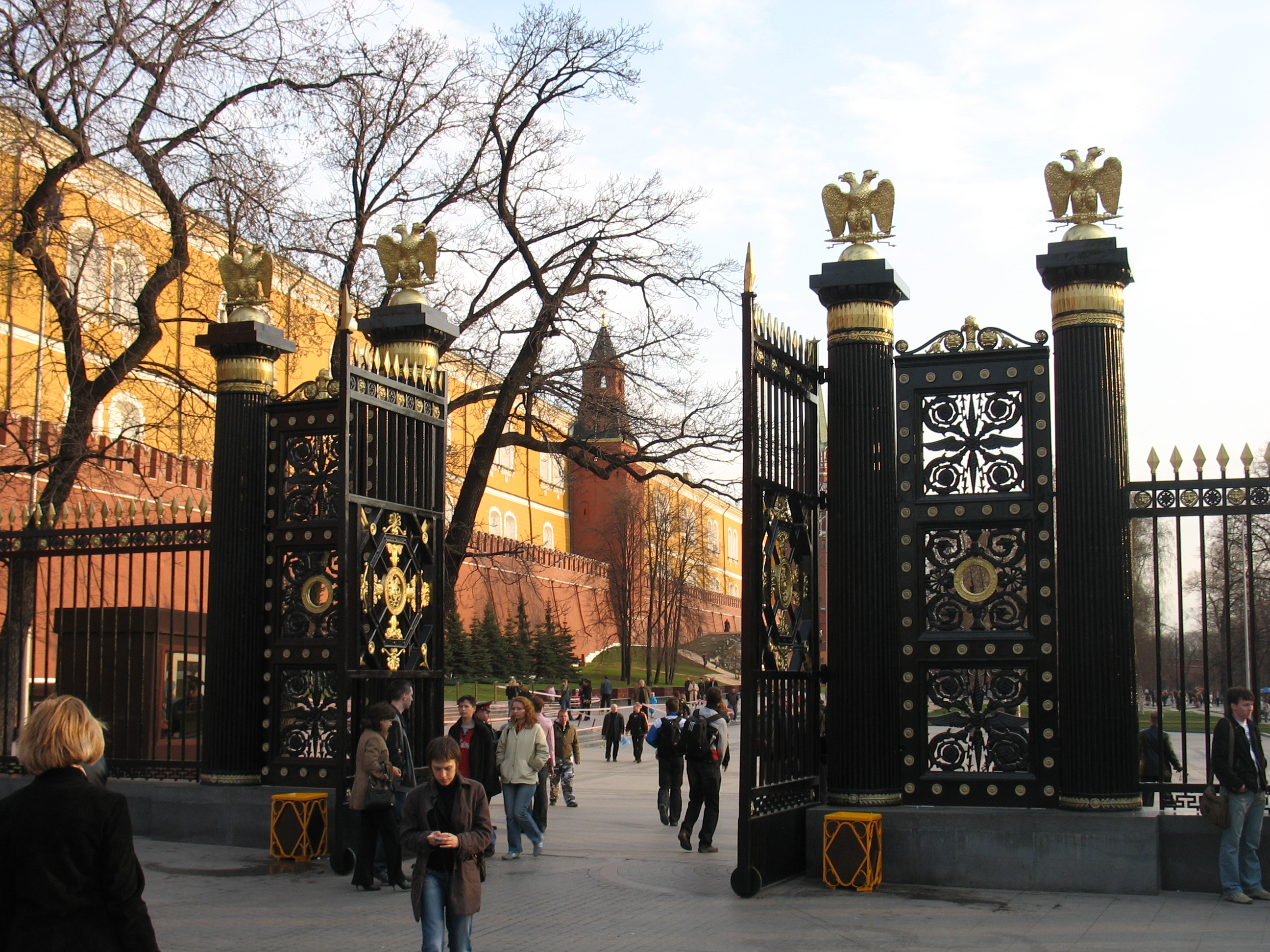
- Interactive map of Alexander Garden
- Type: Urban park
- Coordinates: 55°45′09″N 37°36′50″E
- Created: 1823
- Status: Open all year
- Public transit: Metro: Biblioteka Imeni Lenina; Okhotny Ryad; Ploshchad Revolyutsii; Aleksandrovsky Sad; Borovitskaya

Alexander Gardens (Russian: Александровский сад) is an urban public park in Moscow, Russia. The park comprises three separate gardens, which stretch along all the length of the western Kremlin wall for 865 metres (2,838 ft) between the building of the Moscow Manege and the Kremlin.

== History ==
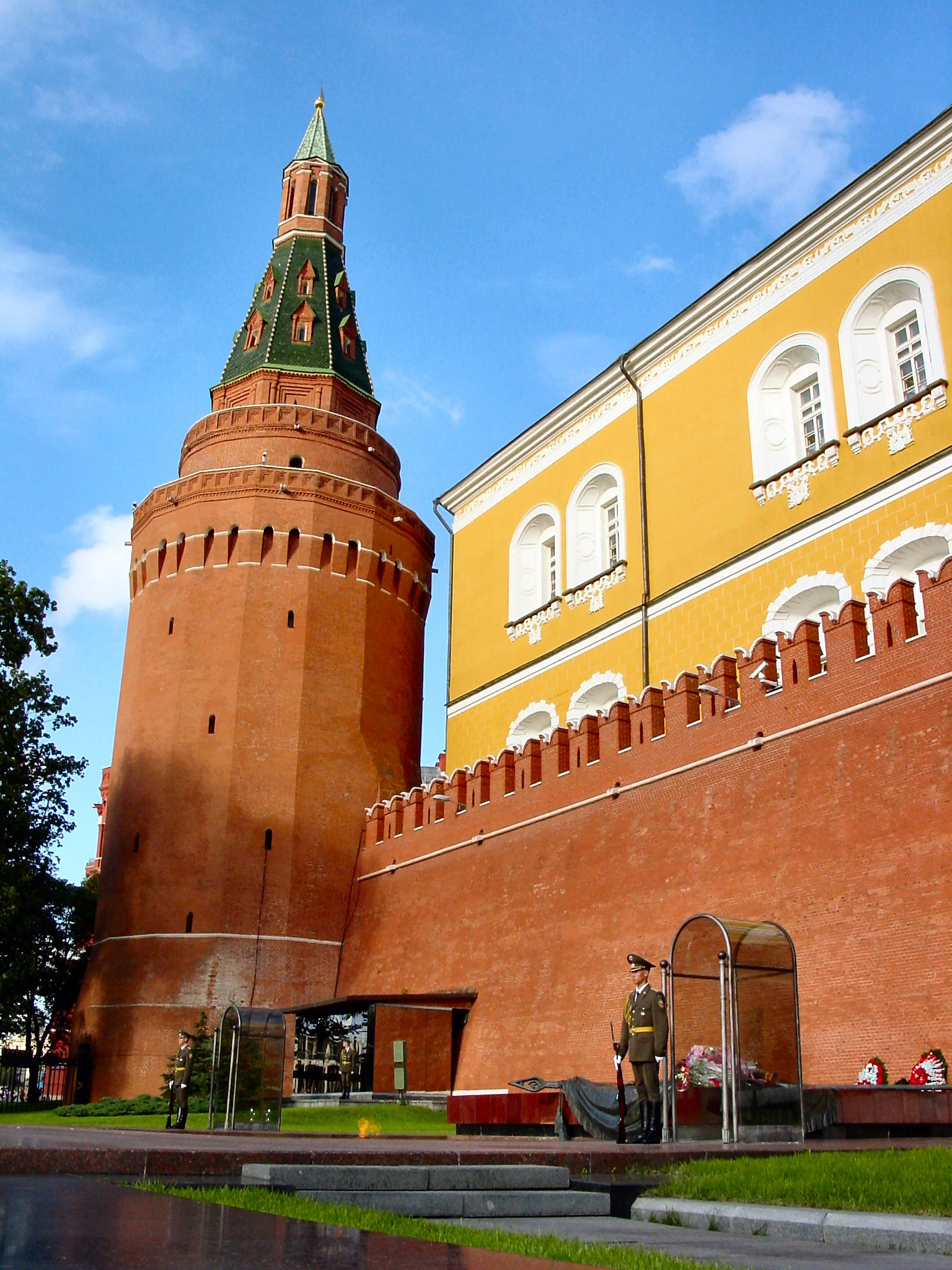
Tomb of the Unknown Soldier

Until the 18th century, the Neglinnaya River flowed on the site of Alexandrovsky Gardens, over which four bridges were built. Historically, folk festivals were held on the river banks, its water was clean and famous for fishing. After the end of the Napoleonic Wars, Emperor Alexander I decided to take the river underground and enclose it in a pipe three kilometres long. Gardens were laid out in the vacated place, designed by the architect Osip Bove as part of a plan to restore Moscow after the fire of 1812.

The gardens were built from 1819 to 1823 and were originally called the Kremlin Gardens. After the coronation of Alexander II in 1856, the gardens were renamed the Alexander Gardens.

== Layout ==
=== Upper Garden ===
Towards the main entrance to the park is the Tomb of the Unknown Soldier with an eternal flame brought from the Field of Mars in Leningrad. Created in 1967, it contains the body of a soldier who fell during the Great Patriotic War at the kilometer 41 marker of Leningradskoe Shosse, the nearest point the forces of Nazi Germany penetrated towards Moscow. Post No. 1, where the Kremlin Regiment stand on guard, used to be located in front of Lenin's Mausoleum, but was moved to the Tomb of The Unknown Soldier in the 1990s. The middle section of the upper garden contains a faux ruined grotto built underneath the Middle Arsenal Tower. Although not constructed until 1841, this was part of Bove's original design. The garden's cast iron gate and grille were designed to commemorate the Russian victories over Napoleon, and its rocks are rubble from buildings destroyed during the French occupation of Moscow.

In front of the grotto is an obelisk erected on July 10, 1914, a year after the tercentenary of the Romanov dynasty was celebrated. The monument made of granite from Finland listed all of the Romanov Tsars and had the coats of arms of the (Russian) provinces. Four years later, the dynasty was gone, and the Bolsheviks (per Lenin’s directive on Monumental propaganda) removed the imperial eagle, and re-carved the monument with a list of 19 socialist and communist philosophers and political leaders, personally approved by Lenin. Originally in the Lower Garden, it was relocated to its present location in 1966. There is discussion to remove Lenin's and reinstall an obelisk duplicating the original.

The wrought iron grille, enclosing this part of the garden, has a design of fasces, which are intended to commemorate the military victory over Napoleon.

The northern part of the garden is adjacent to the large underground shopping complex at Manege Square.

=== Middle Garden ===
The most prominent feature of the Middle Garden is the outlying Kutafya Tower of the Moscow Kremlin. There is an entrance to the park opposite the tower directly to the Moscow Metro system.

=== Lower Garden ===
Laid out in 1823, the Lower Garden stretches to the road leading to the Borovitskaya Tower, one of two vehicular and pedestrian entrances to the Kremlin.
