= Aleksandrovsky Sad (Moscow Metro) =

Moscow Metro station

Aleksandrovsky Sad Александровский сад
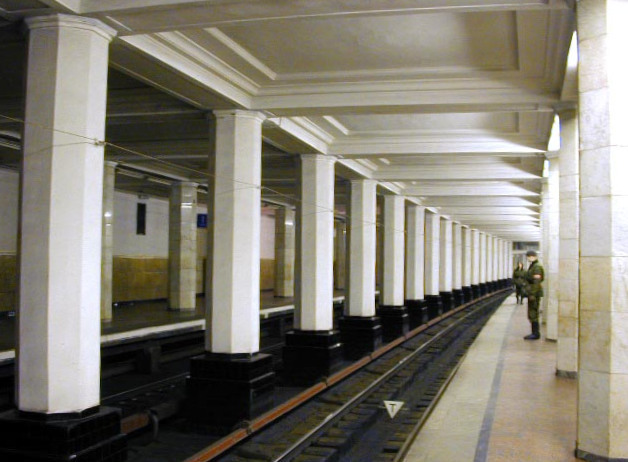

General information
- Location: Arbat District; Central Administrative Okrug; Moscow; Russia
- Coordinates: 55.7525°N 37.6085°E
- System: Moscow Metro station
- Owner: Moskovsky Metropoliten
- Line: Filyovskaya line
- Platforms: 2 side platforms
- Tracks: 2
- Connections: Bus: м1, м2, м3, м6, м27, 144, K; Night bus routes: H1, H2

Construction
- Depth: 8 metres (26 ft)
- Platform levels: 1
- Parking: No

Other information
- Station code: 054

History
- Opened: 15 May 1935; 91 years ago
- Closed: 5 April 1953; 73 years ago to 7 July 1958; 68 years ago
- Former names: Ulitsa Kominterna (1935–1946); Kalininskaya (1946–1990); Vozdvizhenka (1990)

Services
Preceding station	Moscow Metro	Following station
Arbatskaya towards Kuntsevskaya or Mezhdunarodnaya	Filyovskaya line	Terminus
Smolenskaya towards Pyatnitskoye Shosse	Arbatsko-Pokrovskaya line transfer at Arbatskaya	Ploshchad Revolyutsii towards Shchyolkovskaya
Kropotkinskaya towards Potapovo	Sokolnicheskaya line transfer at Biblioteka Imeni Lenina	Okhotny Ryad towards Bulvar Rokossovskogo
Route map
Location
- Location within Central Moscow

Aleksandrovsky Sad (Russian: Алекса́ндровский сад, IPA: [ɐlʲɪˈksandrəfskʲɪj ˈsat]) (English: Alexander Garden) is a station of the Filyovskaya line of the Moscow Metro. It was designed by A. I. Gontskevich and S. Sulin and opened on 15 May 1935 along with the first stage of the metro.

The station is situated under the southern part of the Vozdvizhenka Street (which was then called Kominterna—hence the original name) next to the building of the Russian State Library.

The northern of the two side platforms of the station works during rush hours only.

== History ==
Originally the station was not included in the plans for the first stage due to its closeness to the Biblioteka Imeni Lenina station. When a change to the plans was introduced with a new station it was decided not to augment the design of the planned large tunnel with parallel tracks separated by a row of columns, but to modify it by increasing its height and building platforms on the sides in what is known as a Parisian Style.

Construction began in July 1934, and immediately encountered problems. Under the street, only 1.5–2 metres away from the proposed subway tunnels, was a massive sewage pipe of fragile ceramic, with an outflow of two million buckets. In such conditions, even a slight vibration in the soil would have caused a serious accident.

A few solutions to the problems were proposed, either to temporary turn off the sewer system and deposit the massed water via a gully on the Arbatskaya square into the Moskva River, or to relay the sanitation into metal pipes. Moscow Soviet discarded both ideas, the former out of sanitary and hygienic interests, the second one because that would have required closing off the whole street for a few weeks to the traffic. Engineer Kulbakh came up with a more innovative solution – relaying the collector not from trenches dug up from the surface, but from those in which the walls of the tunnels were built. Works on a shared 40-metre stretch were carried out with superior precision and accuracy, thus preventing the collector to be damaged, with no injuries or streets being closed off.

For the remaining part of the station very little problems took place and in record times on 31 January 1935 the station was completed. The unique circumstances which resulted in station is accredited to its current appearance with side platforms that are curved and three rows of octagonal columns. The two outer rows of columns, which run along the centre line of each platform, are faced with white marble. The third row of columns, painted white and resting on square, black-tiled piers to account for the difference in height between the track bed and the platforms, runs along the main axis of the station and separates the two tracks. Passenger cross over a central bridge that was added later.

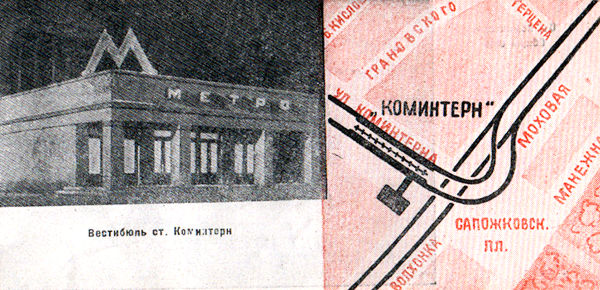
Old vestibule

For entrances and exits as well as transfers to the close by station Biblioteka Imeni Lenina, a temporary vestibule was built (architects P. Faidysh and S. Lavrov), and was situated on the corner of Vozdvizhenka and Mokhovaya streets (currently an entrance to an understreet subway is located there). A more permanent vestibule was planned to be included inside the massive building of the Lenin library. One more vestibule was planned on the western end exiting to a subway underpass across the recently demolished Voyentorg building. Staircases from the platforms still exist and go to rooms that are used for service needs.

No direct transfer to Biblioteka Imeni Lenina originally existed, that was because on the first stage trains went from Sokolniki to Smolenskaya (Kievskaya after 1937) and then onto Park Kultury one after the next. Although transfer corridors were completed soon after, it is unlikely that they were used prior to the opening of the Pokrovskiy radius in 1938 which allowed to separate Arbatskiy from Kirovskiy.

During this time the main library building was being completed which had plans to accommodate a metro entrance inside it. The new vestibule was due to be opened in 1940, but it became apparent that the station will not cope with the passenger traffic that will bestow upon it, and a reconstruction project was developed. Both platforms would be connected with a small footbridge over the paths, and the transfer corridors were to double in width.

However World War II delayed the plans' realisation, and the new vestibule was opened only in 1946. During this time the reconstruction was finally carried out, with the footbridge being directly accessible from the vestibule. Its pre-war planning is clearly demonstrated in the light architecture, uncharacteristic of the postwar Stalinist monumentalism. The dark narrow corridors with staircase were also widened and leveled by raising the floor a total of 1.5 metres. On the 24 December 1946 of that year the reconstruction was complete, and the station was renamed as Kalininskaya following the disestablishment of the Comintern.

On 5 April 1953 a new, deep Arbatsky radius was launched. Kalininskaya was closed to passengers and its underground section was sealed. The vestibule inside the library was handed over to Arbatskaya which required an escalator to be built to connect to the main underground lobby of the new station, a staircase was also built in place of Kalininskaya's foyer. The passenger traffic was also divided, to rise – escalator, down – staircases. Two out of three passes to Kalininskaya's platforms were sealed.

However, on 8 November 1958 metro traffic on the new Filyovskaya line was re-opened, starting from Kalininskaya and including the first, shallow Arbatsky radius.

During the mid-1960s additional access to the subways under the crossroads as well as a second transfer corridor to Biblioteka Imeni Lenina were added. In a second reconstruction (1997–99), the small escalator was removed and replaced with a staircase.

During its history the station was renamed several times, originally opened as Ulitsa Kominterna it was renamed in 1946 to Kalininskaya after Mikhail Kalinin. However the confusion caused by a similarly named Kalininskaya line and the changing politics in the USSR caused the station to be renamed again. In 1990, it was officially renamed Vozdvizhenka for the nearby square; however after only a few days, was renamed Alexandrovsky Sad after the Alexander Garden next to the Kremlin.

== Transfers ==
Station is a part of largest interchange hub of Moscow Metro, consisting of 4 stations. From here, it is possible to change into Arbatskaya station of the Arbatsko–Pokrovskaya line and Biblioteka Imeni Lenina station of the Sokolnicheskaya line in eastern end of station, those 2 stations have combined exit to Mokhovaya street. Through those stations it is possible to change into the Borovitskaya station of the Serpukhovsko–Timiryazevskaya line. There is no direct change into the Borovitskaya station.
