= Okhotny Ryad =

Okhotny Ryad (Russian: Охотный Ряд, literally: Hunters' Row) may reference:

- Okhotny Ryad (street), a street in Moscow
- Okhotny Ryad (Moscow Metro)
- Okhotny Ryad (store) under the Manezhnaya Square, Moscow
- State Duma
