= Borovitskaya (Moscow Metro) =

Moscow Metro station

Borovitskaya Боровицкая
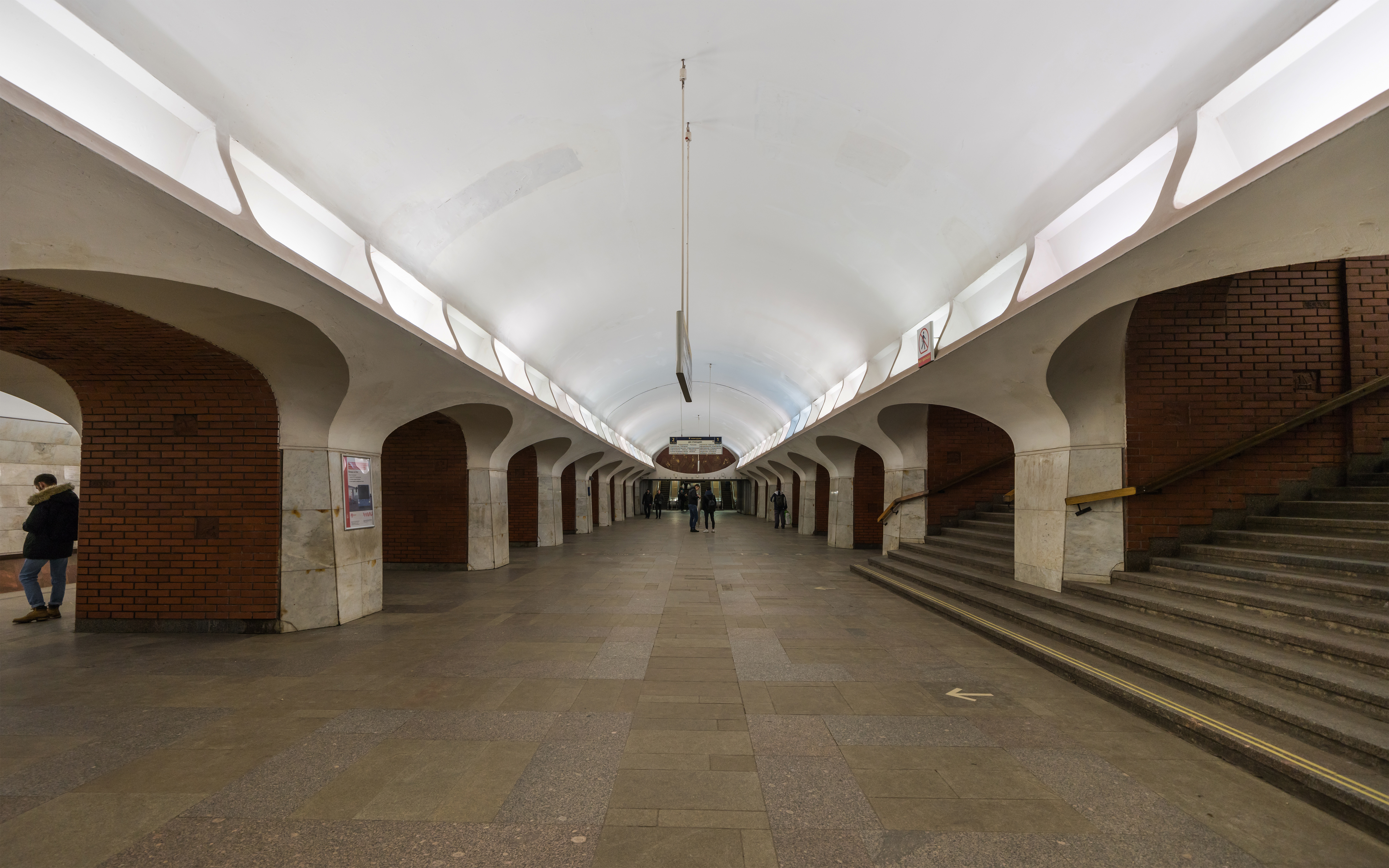

General information
- Location: Arbat District, Central Administrative Okrug; Moscow; Russia
- Coordinates: 55.7511°N 37.6072°E
- System: Moscow Metro station
- Owner: Moskovsky Metropoliten
- Line: Serpukhovsko-Timiryazevskaya line
- Platforms: 1
- Tracks: 2

Construction
- Structure type: pylon tri-vault
- Depth: 46.5 metres (153 ft)
- Platform levels: 1
- Parking: No

Other information
- Station code: 140

History
- Opened: 23 January 1986; 40 years ago

Services
Preceding station	Moscow Metro	Following station
Chekhovskaya towards Altufyevo	Serpukhovsko-Timiryazevskaya line	Polyanka towards Bulvar Dmitriya Donskogo
Smolenskaya towards Pyatnitskoye Shosse	Arbatsko-Pokrovskaya line transfer at Arbatskaya	Ploshchad Revolyutsii towards Shchyolkovskaya
Kropotkinskaya towards Potapovo	Sokolnicheskaya line transfer at Biblioteka Imeni Lenina	Okhotny Ryad towards Bulvar Rokossovskogo
Route map
Location
- Location within Central Moscow

Borovitskaya (Russian: Боровицкая) is a station of the Serpukhovsko-Timiryazevskaya Line of the Moscow Metro. It was opened in January 1986. It is geographically located in the very centre of Moscow, although it is mainly used as a transfer station.

== Transfers ==
The station provides transfers to the Biblioteka Imeni Lenina station of the Sokolnicheskaya Line, and the Arbatskaya station of the Arbatsko-Pokrovskaya Line. It shares its ground vestibule and exit to Mokhovaya Street and Borovitskaya Square with the station Biblioteka Imeni Lenina. There is no direct transfer to the Aleksandrovsky Sad station which is a part of the same interchange point; it's accessible via each of the above two stations only.

== Gallery ==
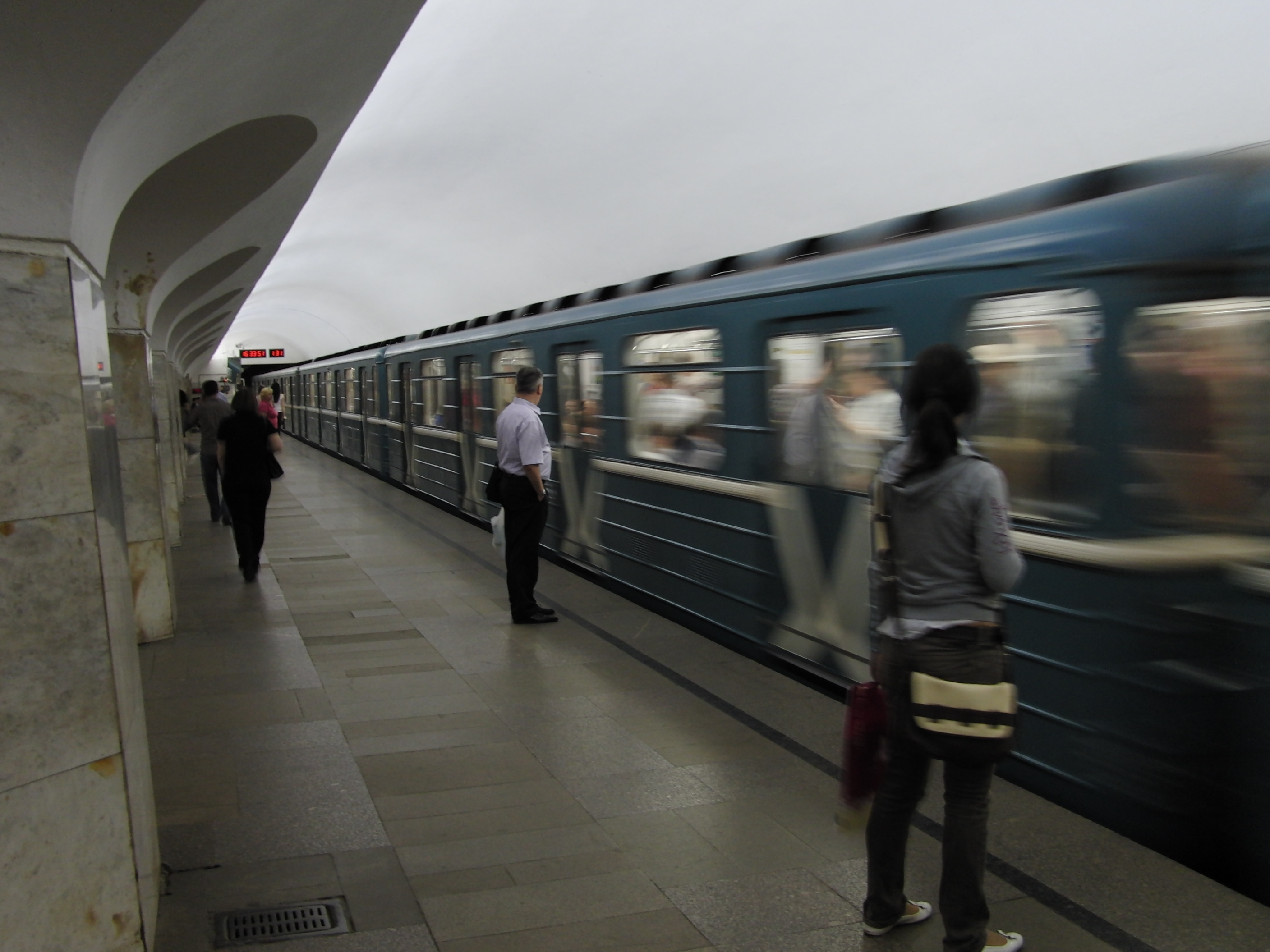
Station platform
