= Manège =

Manège is the French word for a riding academy. As a loanword in Russian it is transliterated back into Latin script as Manezh (Манеж) or Manege.

It may refer to any riding school, riding arena or exercise rectangle, or specifically to:

- the Salle du Manège in Paris, France

or, also with the spelling "Manezh", to one of the following:

- the Veliky Novgorod Manege in Veliky Novgorod, Russia
- the Konnogvardeisky Manege in St. Petersburg, Russia
- the Mikhailovsky Manege in St. Petersburg
- the Moscow Manege in Moscow, Russia
- Manezhnaya Square (disambiguation), in Moscow and St. Petersburg

In Russia and the post Imperial Russian states the word "manezh" is also used for indoor stadium or sports hall built to conduct any team sports or various athletic events.

== See also ==
- Manege (circus), a circular stage in the center of a circus tent
- Ménage (disambiguation)
