= Teatralnaya (Moscow Metro) =

Moscow Metro station

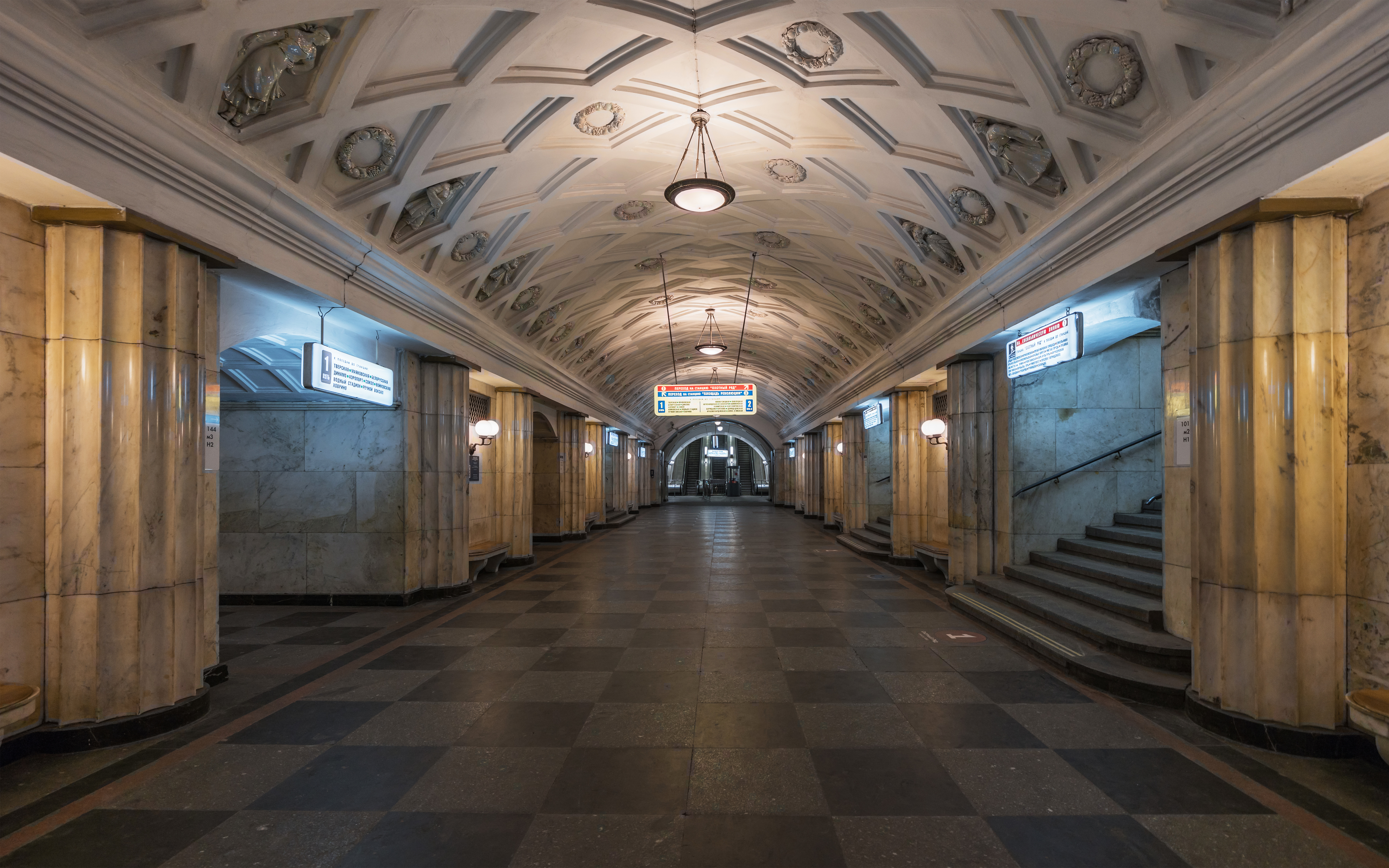

General information
- Location: Tverskoy District; Central Administrative Okrug; Moscow; Russia
- Coordinates: 55.7578°N 37.6190°E
- System: Moscow Metro station
- Owner: Moskovsky Metropoliten
- Line: Zamoskvoretskaya line
- Platforms: 1 island platform
- Tracks: 2
- Connections: Bus: м1, м2, м3, м6, м7, м9, м40, е10, е30, с344, с538; night routes: н1, н2, н6, н11, н12

Construction
- Depth: 33.9 metres (111 ft)
- Platform levels: 1
- Parking: No
- Architect: Ivan Fomin, Leonid Polyakov
- Architectural style: Stalinist Architecture

Other information
- Station code: 032

History
- Opened: 11 September 1938; 87 years ago
- Former names: Ploshchad Sverdlova

Services
| Preceding station | Moscow Metro | Following station |
|---|---|---|
| Tverskaya towards Khovrino | Zamoskvoretskaya line | Novokuznetskaya towards Alma-Atinskaya |
| Biblioteka Imeni Lenina towards Potapovo | Sokolnicheskaya line transfer at Okhotny Ryad | Lubyanka towards Bulvar Rokossovskogo |
| Arbatskaya towards Pyatnitskoye Shosse | Arbatsko-Pokrovskaya line transfer at Ploshchad Revolyutsii | Kurskaya towards Shchyolkovskaya |
Route map
Location
- Location within Central Moscow

Teatralnaya (Russian: Театра́льная, English: Theater) is an underground metro station on the Zamoskvoretskaya line of the Moscow Metro, named for the nearby Teatralnaya Square, the location of numerous theaters, including the famed Bolshoi Theatre. The station is unique in that it does not have its own entrance halls. The north escalator leads to Okhotniy Ryad and the south escalator to Ploshchad Revolyutsii.

== History ==
The station was originally called Ploshchad Sverdlova when it opened on September 11, 1938, as part of the second stage of construction of the Moscow Metro system. It was the terminal station of the Zamoskvoretskaya line until the line was extended on January 1, 1943. Teatralnaya's architect was Ivan Fomin. The station is located at a depth of 33.9 meters (111 feet). The central hall has a diameter of 9.5 meters (31 feet), with an 8.5 meters (28 feet) lateral lining of cast-iron tubing.

From its opening until 1990, the station's name was Ploshchad Sverdlova, which was named in honor of the prominent Bolshevik, Yakov Sverdlov. In 1990, the city changed the name of the square to Teatralnaya Ploshchad. The name of the station followed accordingly.

== Decoration ==
Teatralnaya Station has fluted pylons faced with labradorite and white marble taken from the demolished Cathedral of Christ the Saviour. Crystal lamps in bronze frames attached to the center of the room give the central hall a festive appearance. The vault of the central hall is decorated with caissons and majolica bas-reliefs by Natyla Danko on the theme of theatre arts of the USSR, manufactured by Leningrad Porcelain Factory. These bas-reliefs are a series of fourteen different figures, each representing music and dance from various nationalities of the Soviet Union. Seven male and seven female figures attired in their national costumes are either performing an ethnic dance or are playing a distinctively ethnic musical instrument. The series included Armenia, Byelorussia, Georgia, Kazakhstan, Russia, Ukraine and Uzbekistan. Each figure is reproduced four times for a total of 56 figures. Initially, the floor was of black-and-yellow granite patterned as a chessboard; however in 1970, the yellow panels were replaced with gray.

A bust of Yakov Sverdlov, for whom the station was originally named, was located at the end of the platform opposite the escalators. Only the base remains today. A bust of Vladimir Lenin was however, preserved.

== Transfers ==
From this station it is possible to transfer to Okhotniy Ryad on the Sokolnicheskaya Line and Ploshchad Revolyutsii on the Arbatsko-Pokrovskaya line.

== Gallery ==
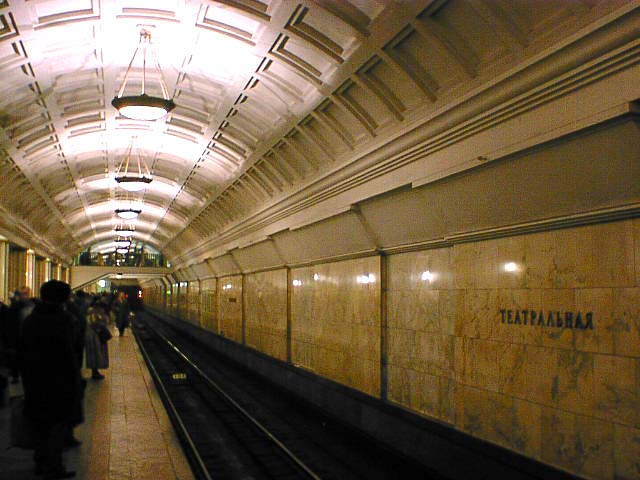
Platform

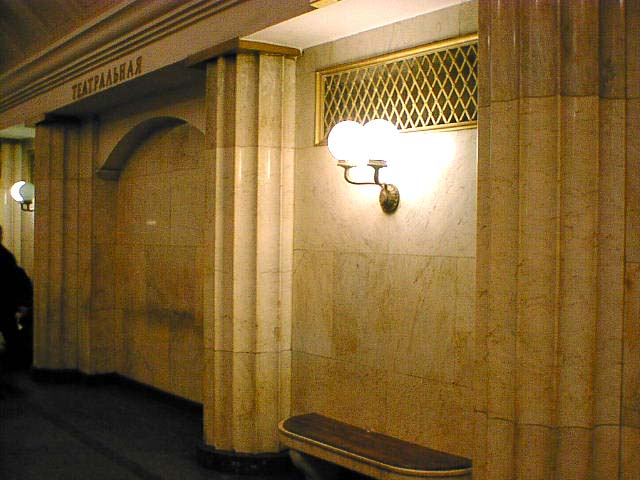
Pylon

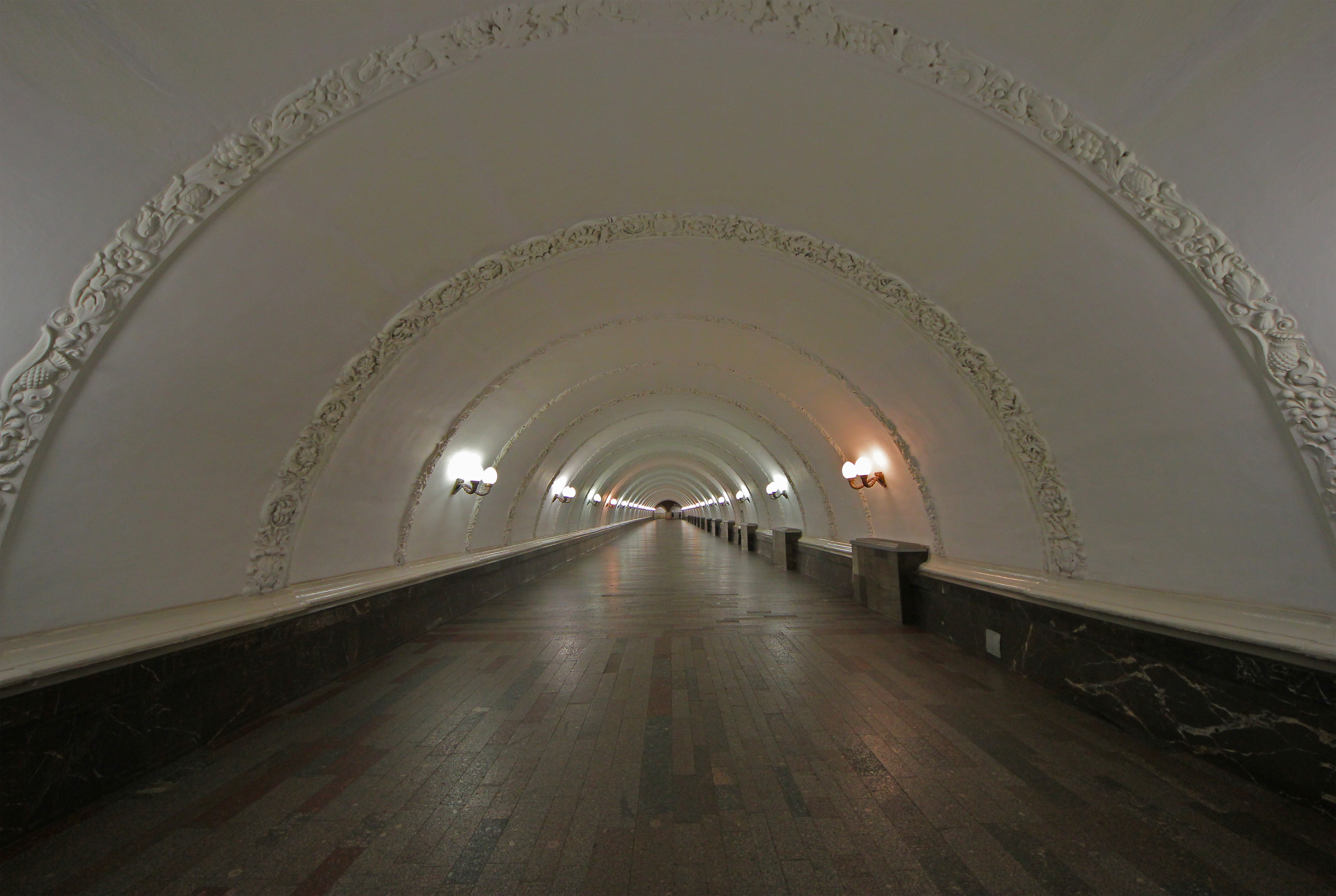
The connection with Okhotny Ryad served by the Sokolnicheskaya Line

== Location ==
The station is limited to the sections: Teatralnaya "Tverskaya" and Teatralnaya "Novokuznetskaya". The Teatralnaya metro station is located in the very center of Moscow. The northern lobby is built into a former apartment building located at Bolshaya Dmitrovka street, exit to Theatre Square (Moscow). The southern lobby faces Revolution Square, Moscow.

=== Sights ===
There are a lot of attractions near the Teatralnaya metro station:

Exit to Teatralnaya Square:

1 — Bolshoi Theater
2 — Maly Theater
3 — State Academic Theater "Moscow Operetta"
4 — Moscow Art Theater named after A.P. Chekhov
5 — Russian Academic Youth Theater
6 — House of the Unions
7 — TsUM (Moscow)

Exit to the Revolution Square:

8 — Red Square
9 — Tomb of the Unknown Soldier (Moscow)
10 — State Historical Museum
11 — Hotel Metropol Moscow
12 — GUM (department store)
13 — Okhotny Ryad

=== Ground public transport ===
At this station, you can change to the following routes of urban passenger transport [37]:

Buses: 38, 101, 144, 904, m1, m2, m3, m10, m27, s43, n1, n2, n6, n11
