= Arbatskaya (Arbatsko–Pokrovskaya line) =

Moscow Metro station

Arbatskaya Арбатская
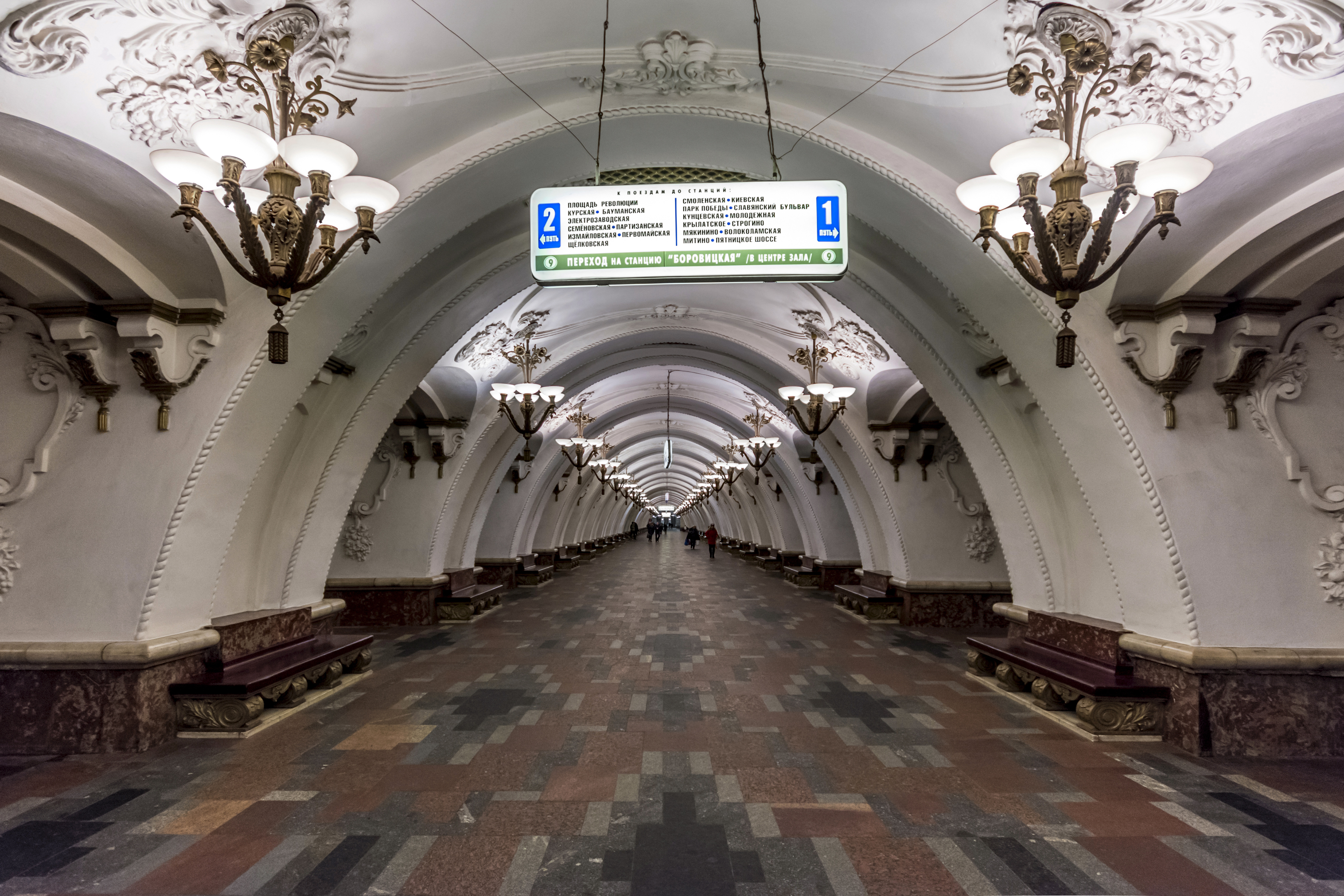

General information
- Location: Arbat District; Central Administrative Okrug; Moscow; Russia
- Coordinates: 55.7522°N 37.6061°E
- System: Moscow Metro station
- Owner: Moskovsky Metropoliten
- Line: Arbatsko-Pokrovskaya line
- Platforms: 1 island platform
- Tracks: 2

Construction
- Structure type: Pylon station
- Depth: 41 metres (135 ft)
- Platform levels: 1
- Parking: No

Other information
- Station code: 042

History
- Opened: 5 April 1953; 73 years ago

Services
Preceding station	Moscow Metro	Following station
Smolenskaya towards Pyatnitskoye Shosse	Arbatsko-Pokrovskaya line	Ploshchad Revolyutsii towards Shchyolkovskaya
Arbatskaya towards Kuntsevskaya	Filyovskaya line transfer at Aleksandrovsky Sad	Terminus
Kropotkinskaya towards Potapovo	Sokolnicheskaya line transfer at Biblioteka Imeni Lenina	Okhotny Ryad towards Bulvar Rokossovskogo
Chekhovskaya towards Altufyevo	Serpukhovsko-Timiryazevskaya line transfer at Borovitskaya	Polyanka towards Bulvar Dmitriya Donskogo
Route map
Location
- Location within Central Moscow

Arbatskaya (Russian: Арба́тская) is a station on the Arbatsko–Pokrovskaya line of the Moscow Metro. Along with Smolenskaya and Kievskaya, it was built in 1953 to replace an older, parallel section of track which has since become part of the Filyovskaya line. The old station had been damaged in a German bomb attack in 1941, so its replacement was much deeper and included larger stations that could double as shelters (especially in the event of nuclear attack). Although it was initially supposed to be closed permanently, the old section reopened five years later, creating the somewhat confusing situation of having two pairs of completely separate stations with the same names (Arbatskaya and Smolenskaya).

Arbatskaya was designed by Leonid Polyakov, Valentin Pelevin and Yury Zenkevich. Since it was meant to serve as a bomb shelter as well as a Metro station, Arbatskaya is both large (the 250-m platform is the second-longest in Moscow) and deep (41 m underground). The main tunnel is elliptical in cross-section, an unusual departure from the standard circular design. The station features low, square pylons faced with red marble and a high vaulted ceiling elaborately decorated with ornamental brackets, floral reliefs, and chandeliers.

== Transfers ==
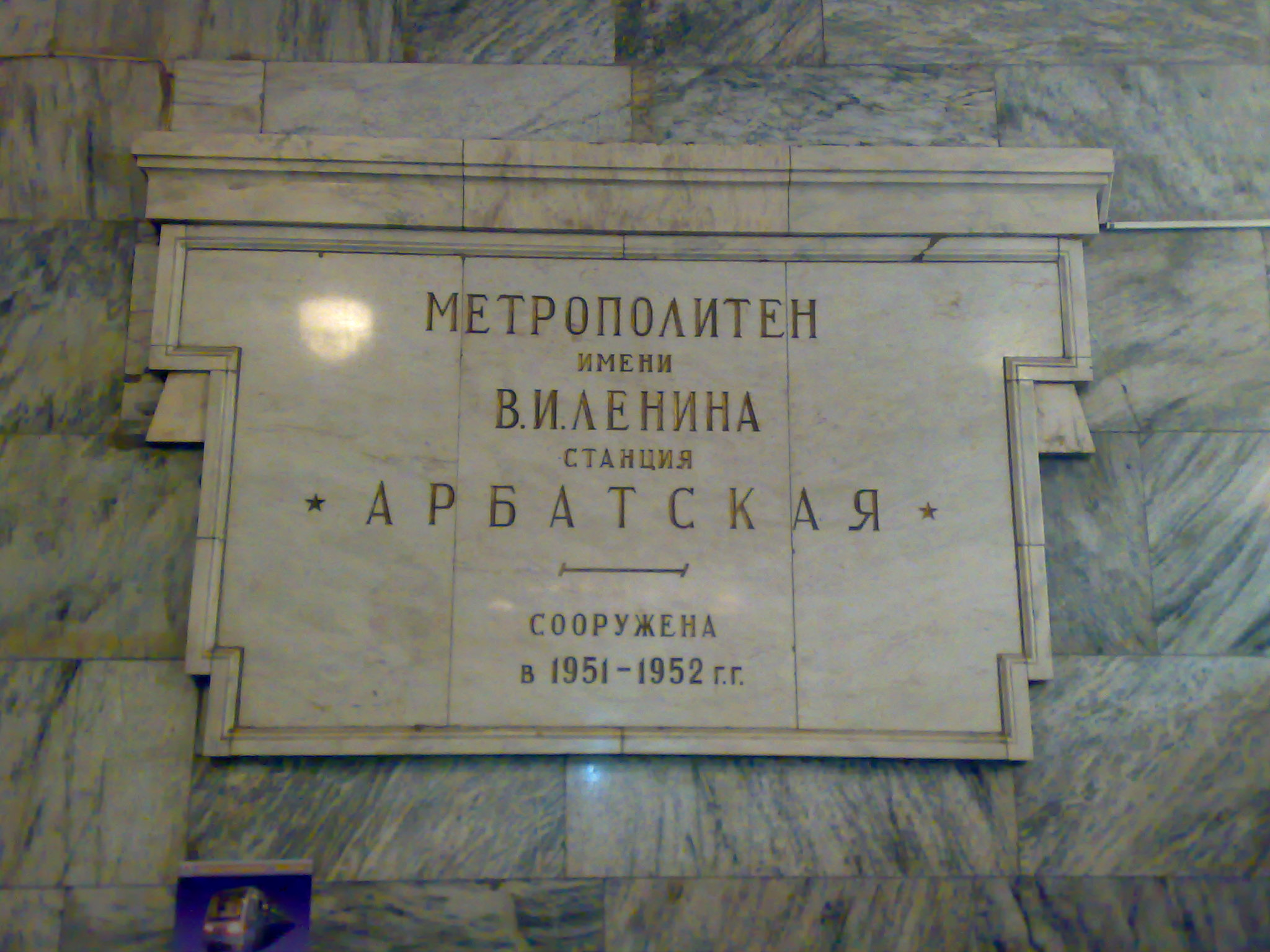
Plaque in the passage connecting Arbatsko–Pokrovskaya and Filyovskaya lines

From this station passengers can transfer to Biblioteka Imeni Lenina on the Sokolnicheskaya line, Aleksandrovsky Sad on the Filyovskaya line, and Borovitskaya on the Serpukhovsko–Timiryazevskaya line. Despite the name, however, it is not possible to transfer to Arbatskaya on the Filyovskaya line.

== In popular culture ==
The station and Arbatskaya on the Filyovskaya line are featured in the Moscow segment of Resident Evil: Retribution.

The station, alongside Aleksandrovskiy Sad, Biblioteka Lenina, and Borovitskaya, makes up the 'city-state' of Polis in the Metro series of games and novels.
