= Eternal triangle (disambiguation) =

Eternal triangle is a type of love triangle.

The term Eternal triangle can also refer to:

- Eternal Triangle, a London based pop group
- "Eternal Triangle", a jazz standard by Sonny Stitt, recorded on the album Sonny Side Up
- The Eternal Triangle, an album by trumpeters Freddie Hubbard and Woody Shaw
- The Eternal Triangle (film), a 1917 British silent romance film

== See also ==
- Love triangle (disambiguation)
