= Love triangle (disambiguation) =

A love triangle is a romantic relationship involving three people.

Love triangle may also refer to:

- The triangular theory of love, developed by psychologist Robert Sternberg to describe types of love
- "Love Triangle" (The Fairly OddParents), a television episode
- Love Triangle (game show), a reality game show hosted by Wendy Williams
- "Love Triangle" (RaeLynn song), 2016
- "Love Triangle" (Wolf Howl Harmony song), 2024
- "Love Triangle" (Snuff Box), a television episode
- Love Triangle (book), a nonfiction book by Matt Parker

== See also ==
- Bizarre Love Triangle, a 1986 song by New Order
- Eternal triangle (disambiguation)
- Ménage à Trois (disambiguation)
