= Manezhnaya Square =

Manezhnaya Square, Russian: Манежная площадь may refer to:

- Manezhnaya Square, Moscow
- Manezhnaya Square, Saint Petersburg
