= Manezhnaya Square, Moscow =

Square in Moscow, Russia

Manezhnaya Square
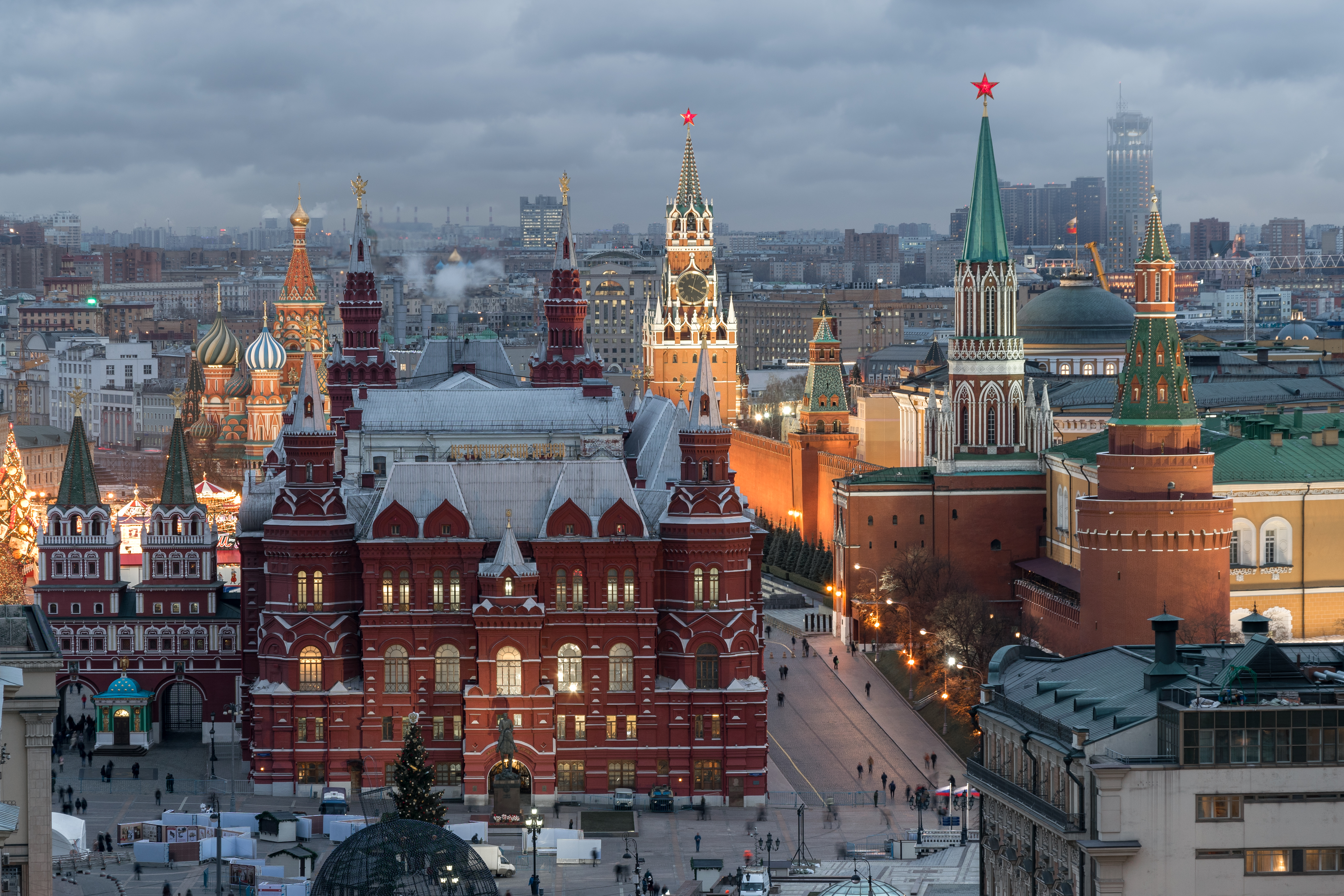
- View of the State Historical Museum from the Manezhnaya Square
- Interactive map of Manezhnaya Square
- Native name: Манежная площадь (Russian)
- Location: Moscow; Central Administrative Okrug; Tverskoy District
- Postal code: 125009
- Nearest metro station: Okhotny Ryad; Teatralnaya; Ploshchad Revolyutsii
- Coordinates: 55°45′21″N 37°36′53″E

Manezhnaya (Russian: Манежная площадь, IPA: [mɐˈnʲeʐnəjə ˈploɕːɪtʲ], lit. 'Manege Square') is a pedestrian open space in the Tverskoy District, at the heart of Moscow. It is bound by the Hotel Moskva to the east, the State Historical Museum and the Alexander Garden to the south, the Moscow Manege to the west, and the 18th-century headquarters of the Moscow State University to the north.

The square forms a vital part of downtown Moscow, connecting Red Square (which sprawls behind the Iberian Gate immediately to the south) with the major traffic artery Tverskaya Street, which starts here and runs northwestward in the direction of Saint Petersburg. It is served by three Moscow Metro stations: Okhotny Ryad, Ploshchad Revolyutsii, and Teatralnaya.

== History ==
The Manezhka (as it is familiarly known) had its origins in Moiseyevskaya Square, which was formed in 1798 in consequence of the demolition of the medieval Moiseyevsky Monastery which had stood on the banks of the muddy Neglinnaya River since the times of Ivan the Terrible. Although the river was later culverted, the neighbourhood remained crammed with public houses and taverns, which gave the area its infamous nickname of "Moscow's belly".

A decision was reached in 1932 to pull down these "ugly relics of the bourgeois lifestyle" in order to make room for Communist meetings and demonstrations. As a result, the 19th-century Grand Hotel and several Neoclassical mansions by Osip Bove were dismantled, whereupon the Moiseyevskaya Square was expanded to its present size and renamed Manezhnaya after the Moscow Manege it now abutted upon.

Notwithstanding its new name, the eastern side of the square came to be dominated by another building, the newly built Hotel Moskva, a hybrid of several styles, most notable for its huge proportions and uptight look.

In 1967, the square was renamed after the 50th Anniversary of the October Revolution. Furthermore, in order to commemorate that event, the Communist authorities laid a foundation stone for a grandiose sculptural monument, which failed to materialize.

In August 1991, Manezhnaya Square (its name by then restored) became a venue for great demonstrations celebrating the fall of Communism after the abortive Soviet coup attempt of 1991. More recently, it made the news in connection with riots following the Russia national football team's defeat at the 2002 FIFA World Cup. The place became a stage of rioting again in December 2010, when thousands of youth representing football fans and/or those who support nationalist slogans held a rally at Manezhnaya which turned violent. It made the square's name common in media when it comes to growth of nationalist sentiments in modern Russia.

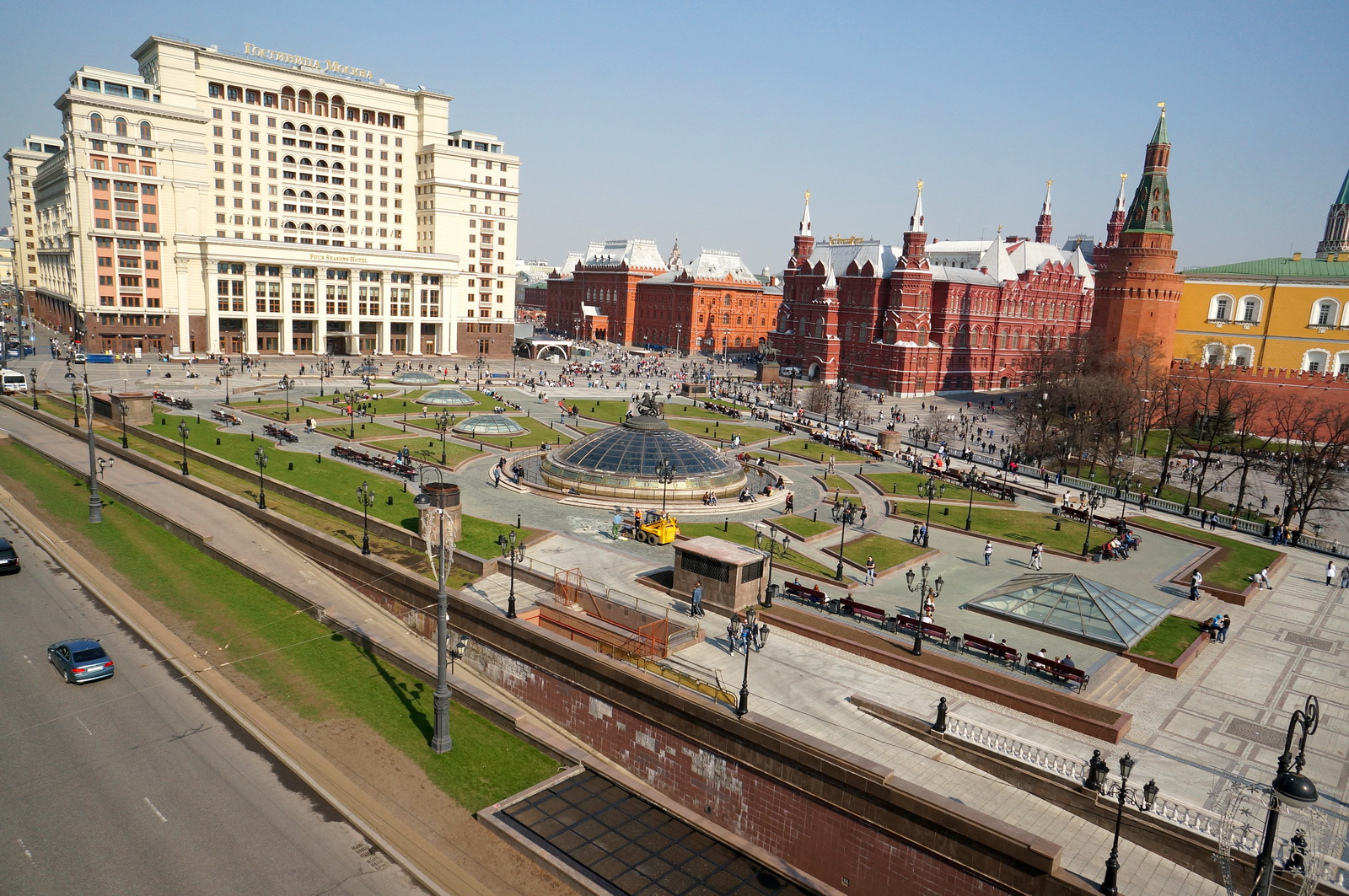
In the center glass dome of the four-story underground shopping mall "Okhotny Ryad"

== Reconstruction ==
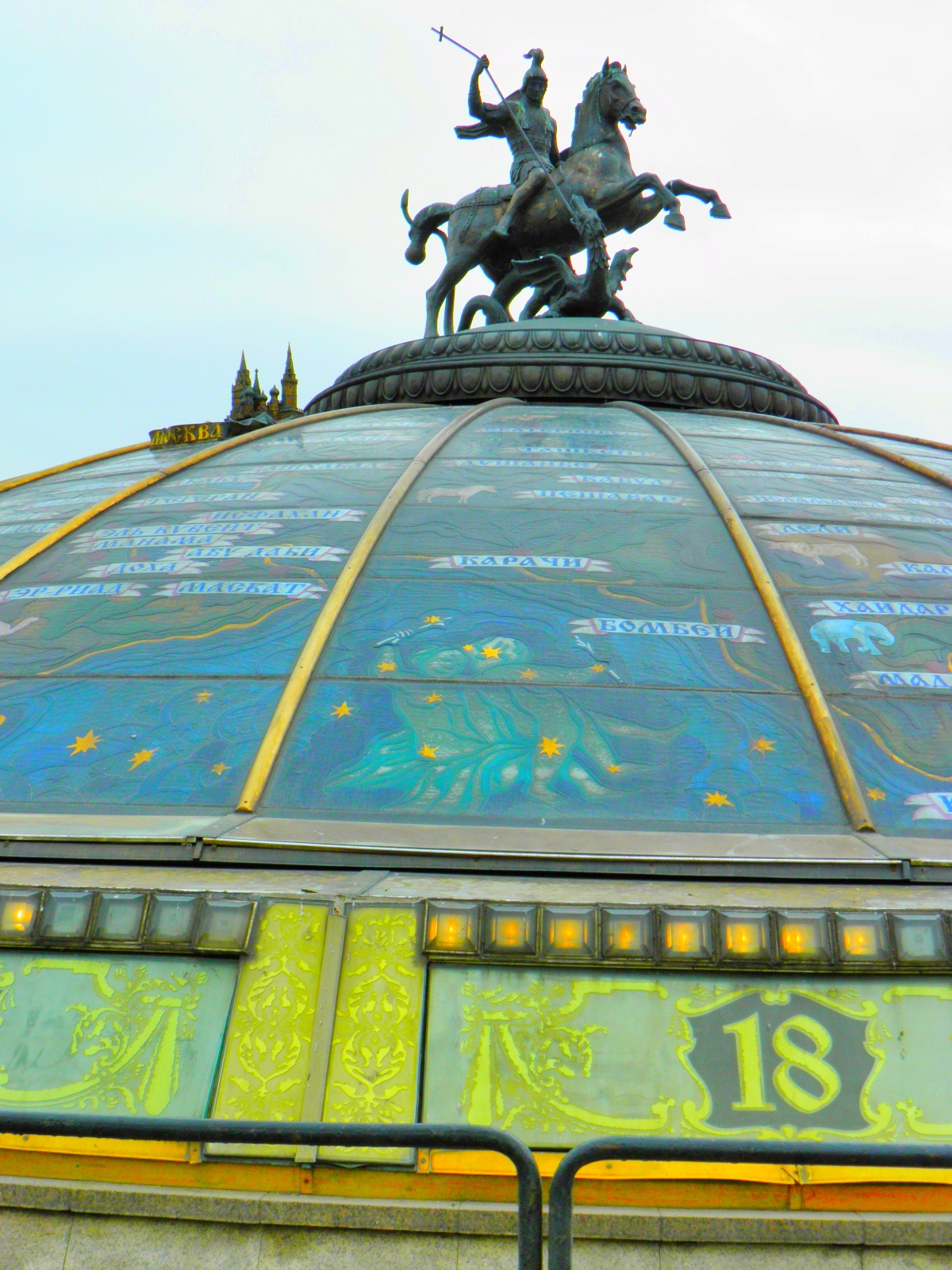
Rotating glass clock cupola and statue

During the 1990s Moscow mayor Yury Luzhkov had the square closed to traffic and substantially renovated. The centrepiece of the refurbished square is a four-story underground shopping mall and parking lot, surmounted by a rotating glass cupola, which forms a world clock of the Northern Hemisphere with major cities marked and a scheme of lights below each panel to show the progression of the hour. On the top of the cupola is an equestrian statue of Saint George and the Dragon, the symbol of Moscow.

Another innovation is the former river-bed of the Neglinnaya River, which has become a popular attraction for Muscovites and tourists alike, especially on sultry summer days. The course of the river (which now really flows underground) is imitated by a rivulet dotted with fountains and statues of Russian fairy-tale characters, as sculpted by Zurab Tsereteli. In 1995, Vyacheslav Klykov's equestrian statue of Marshal Zhukov was unveiled in front of the State Historical Museum to mark the 50th anniversary of the Moscow Victory Parade of 1945, when the Soviet commander had spectacularly ridden a white stallion through Red Square and Manege Square.

== Gallery ==
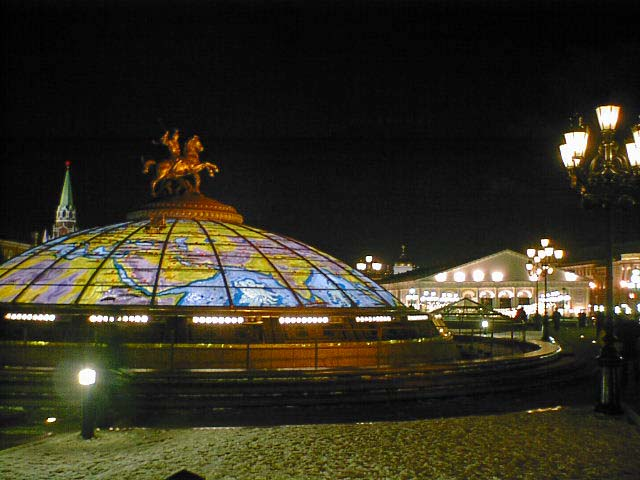
Glass cupola crowned by a statue of Saint George, holy patron of Moscow, with the Manege looming in the background (western side)

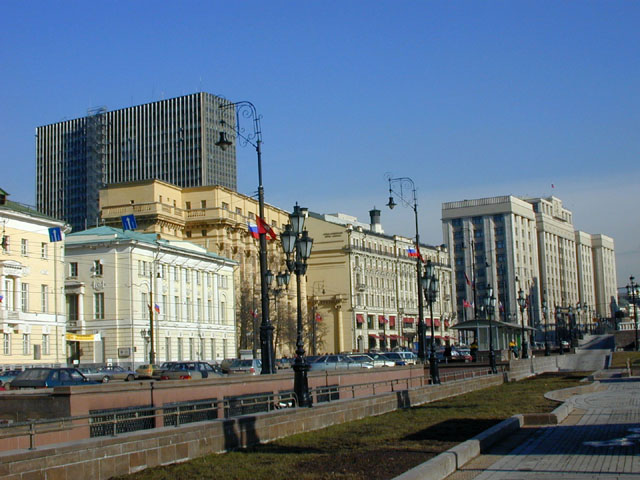
View towards the State Duma (northern side)

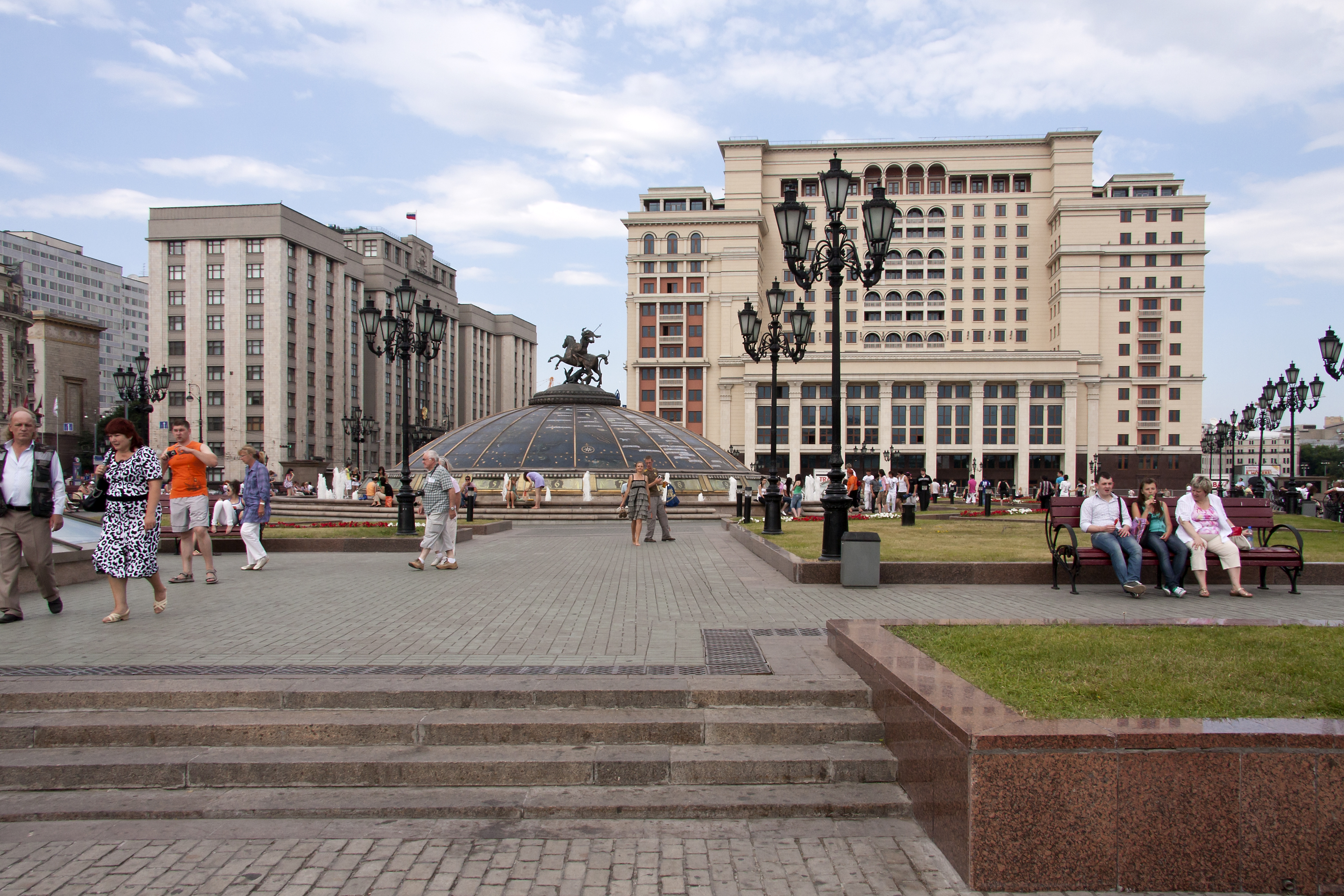
View towards the Hotel Moskva (eastern side)

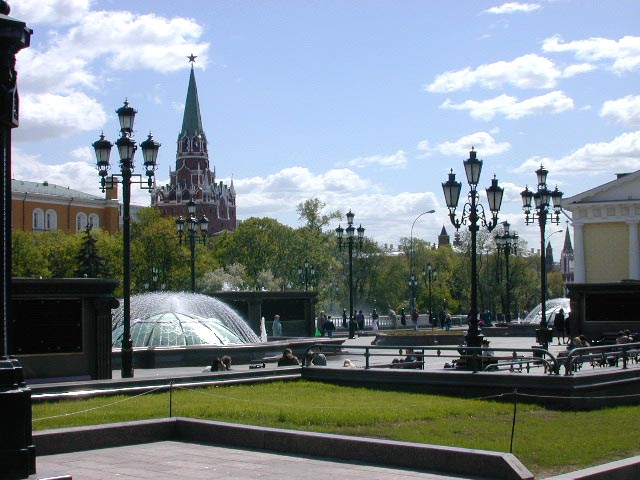
View towards the Alexander Garden (southern side)

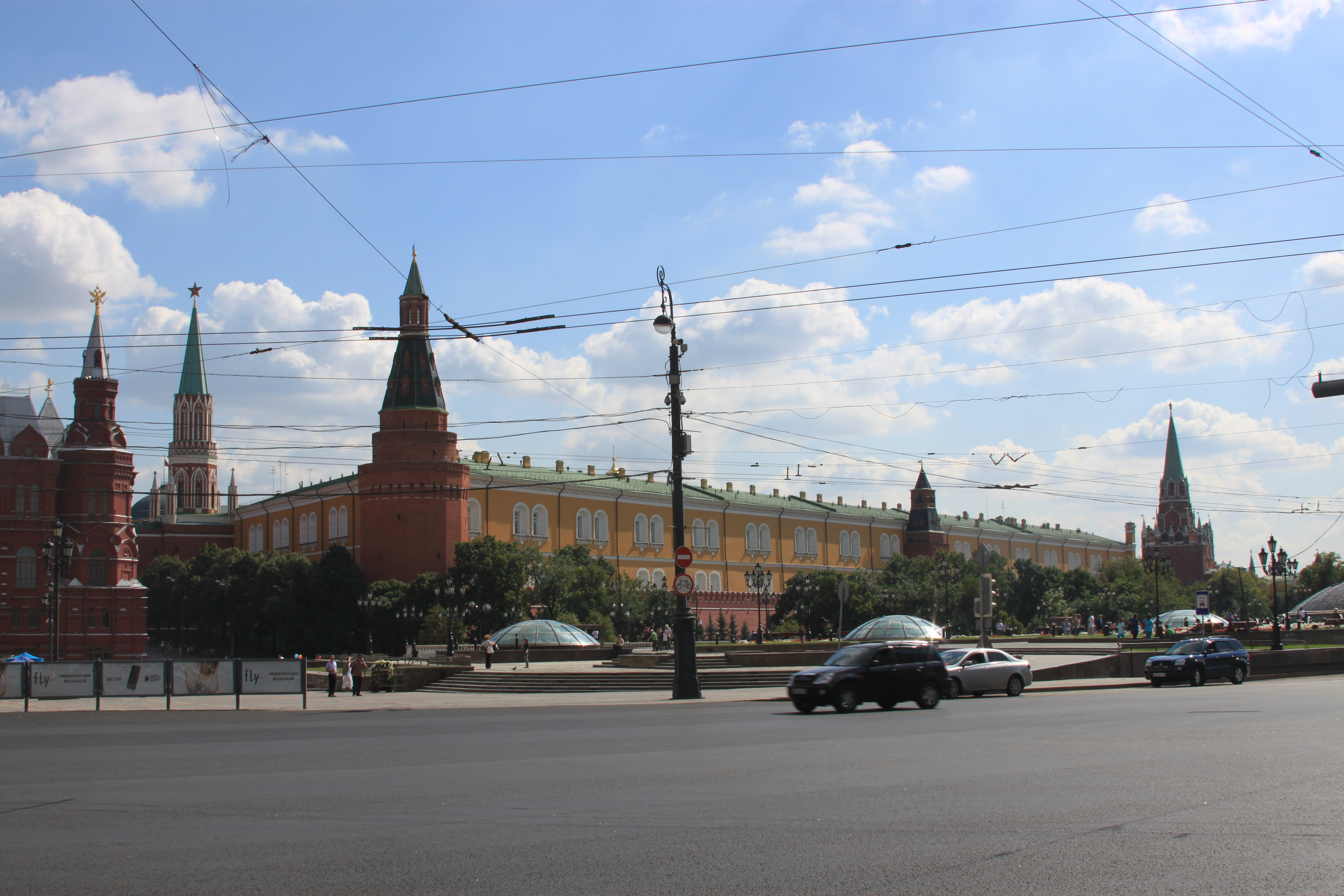
Manezhnaya Square seen from the start of Tverskaya Street

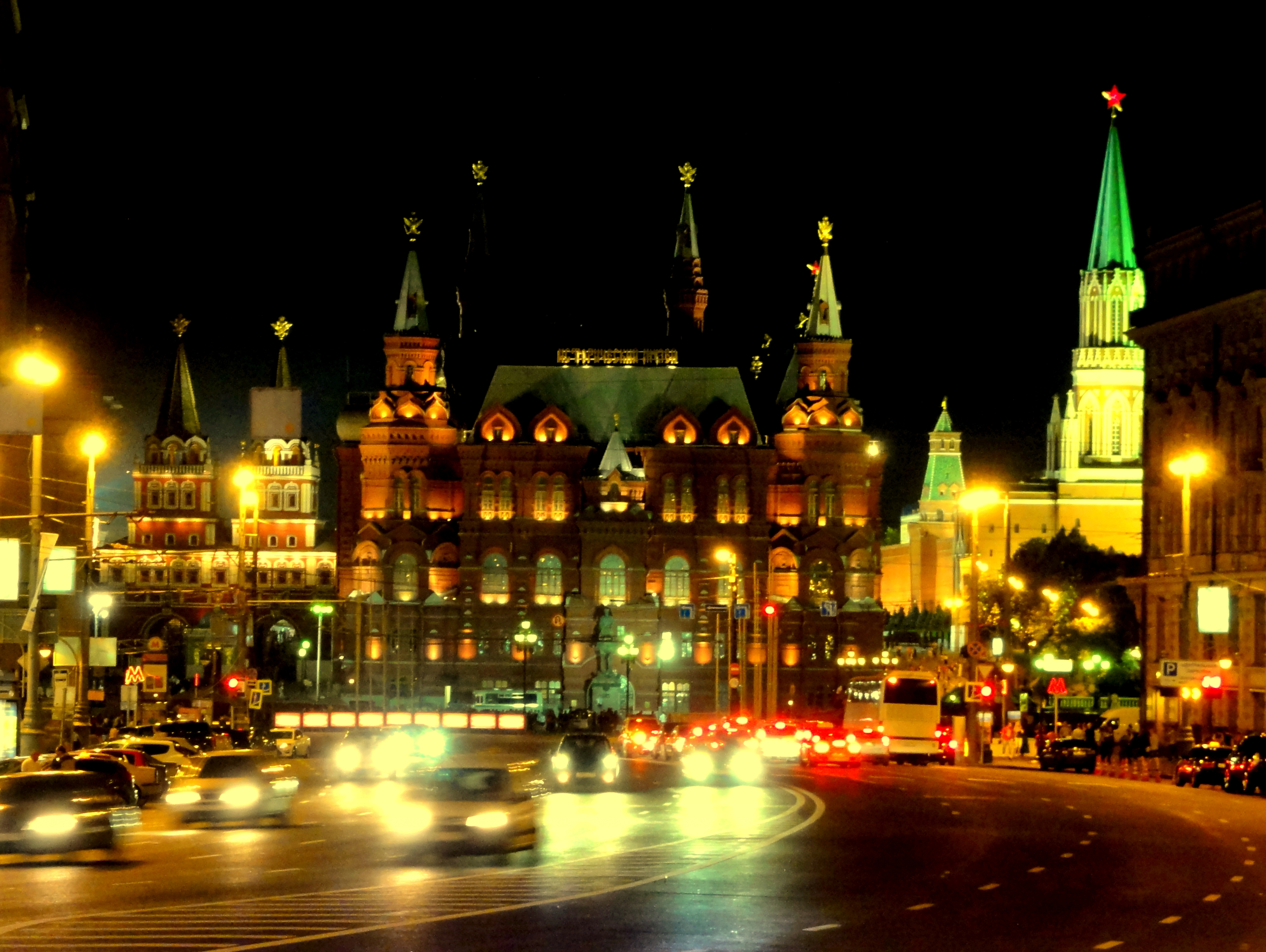
At night
