= Guard (military) =

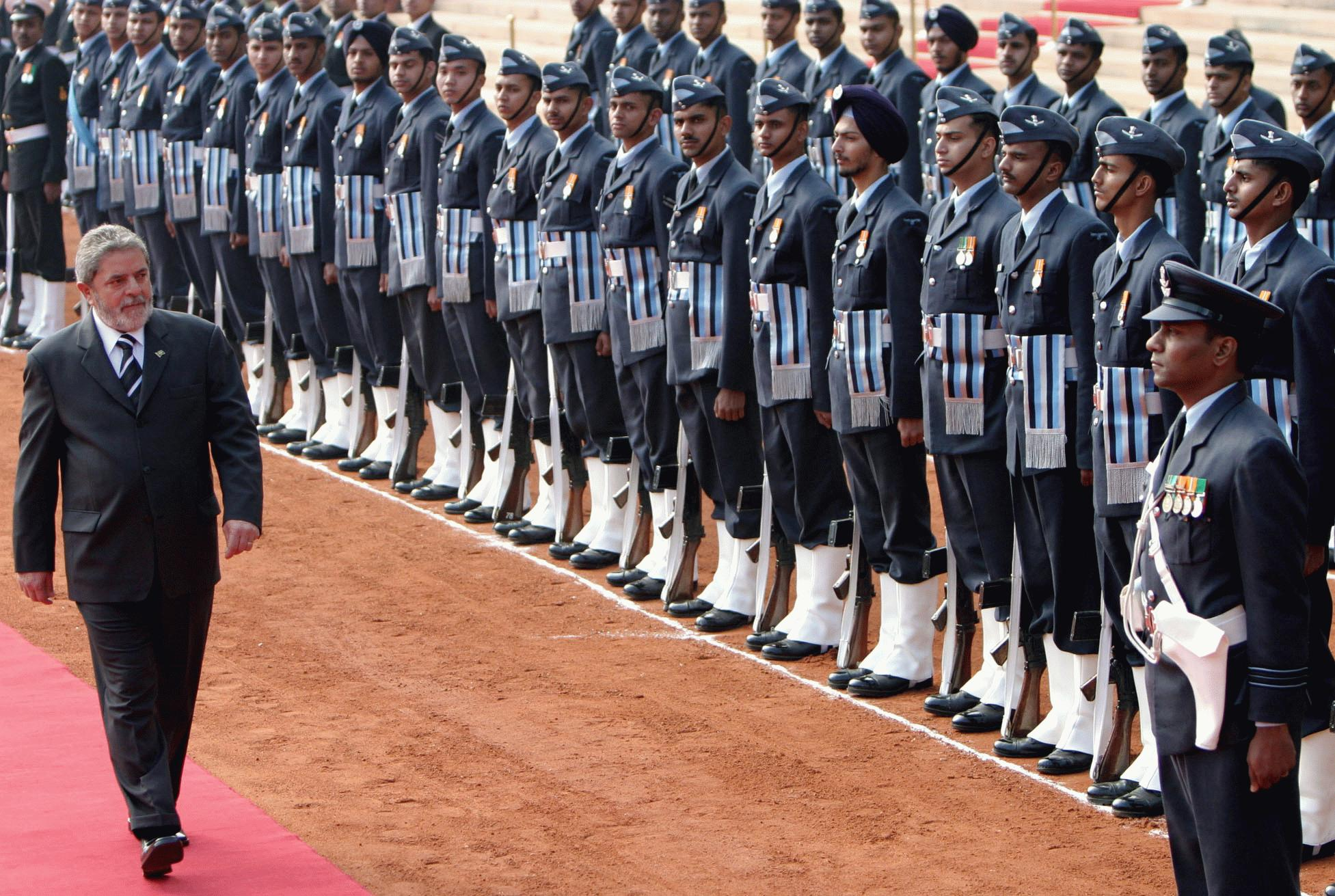
The Indian guard of honour greets the President of Brazil Luiz Inacio Lula da Silva at the Rashtrapati Bhavan

Guard (Russian: Караул; Polish: Warta; Ukrainian: Варта; French: Garde) is an armed unit that performs a combat mission to protect and defend battle flags, military and state facilities, protect persons held in the guardhouse or in a disciplinary battalion, and also to render military honors.

== Etymology ==
In the Russian language the term is called Karaul (Russian: Караул) originated from Kazakh word Karau (Kazakh: карау) which stands for I watch and aul (Kazakh: аул). Guards were also called guard detachments sent by Turkic military leaders to reconnoiter the route before the main army arrived. In the Explanatory Dictionary of the Living Great Russian Language Karaul, is a guard, people assigned to guard, with the purpose of saving something.

== Overview ==
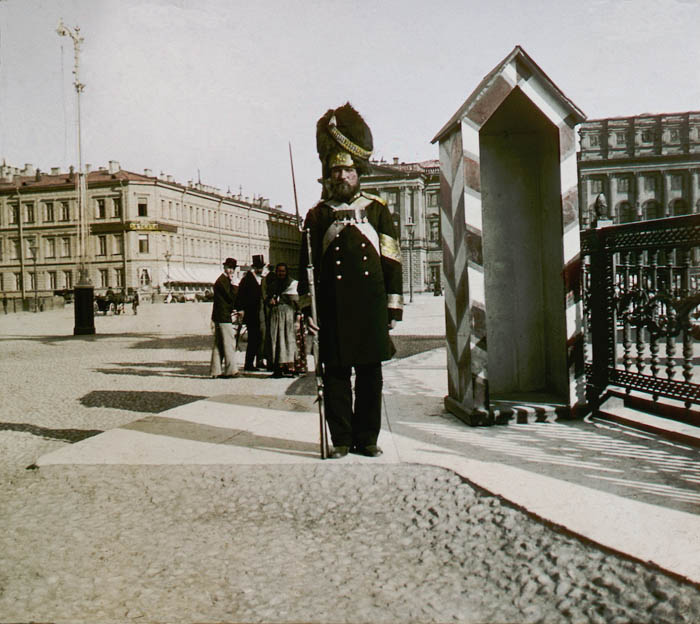
A sentry of the guard, from the personnel of the company of palace grenadiers, at his post at the monument to Nicholas I on Saint Isaac's Square in Saint Petersburg, 1896.

Depending on the state affiliation of the armed forces, there are different types of guards. According to the Charter of the Garrison and Guard Service of the Russian Armed Forces, there are 3 types of guards:

- Internal guard is a guard for the protection of objects in a military town, at the permanent deployment point of a military unit. That is, inside the military town (ship). It is located within the perimeter of the military town, in a separate building with a fenced area called a guard town. The guard town is a restricted area on the territory of the military unit. Access to it for military personnel not engaged in guard duty is limited. The internal guard is not a permanent formation. It is formed for a certain period of time. For example, in the Soviet Armed Forces, the guard is formed for 24 hours. After 24 hours, the guard in full force is replaced by another guard according to the established procedure. The internal guard is subordinate to the commander of the military unit, known as Korablya (Russian: корабля), the duty officer for the unit and his assistant.
- Garrison (camp) guard is a guard for the protection and defense of garrison facilities that do not have their own security units, as well as for the protection of military personnel held in the garrison guardhouse. Subordinate to the garrison (camp assembly) chief, the garrison military commandant and the guard duty officer.
- Guard of honour - is a ceremonial unit of permanent or temporary composition, formed to protect historical sites, state facilities, to meet high officials of foreign states, to render military honours.

According to the organization, guards are permanent and temporary.

Permanent guards are guards of facilities that are under constant protection. Permanent guards are provided for by the guard schedule, which determines the change of units going on duty. Temporary guards are appointed by order to protect and defend military property during its loading (unloading) at railway stations (river/sea ports, airports) or temporary storage in other places during natural disasters and fires, to protect and escort special cargo, as well as to protect arrested and convicted persons during transportation. The most famous permanent guard in Russia is Post No. 1 at standing next to the Tomb of the Unknown Soldier at Alexander Garden in Moscow.

== Legal basis ==
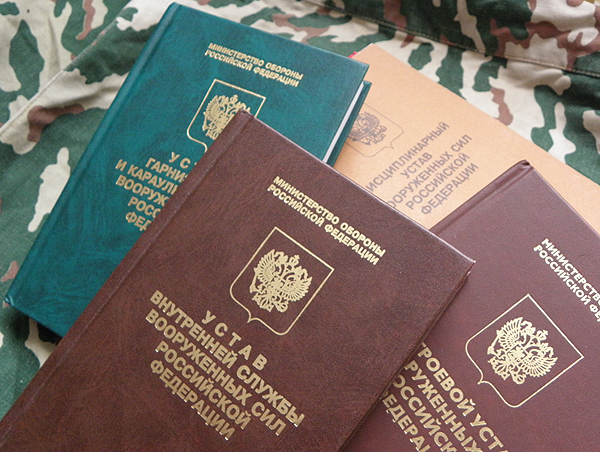
On the left is the charter of the garrison and guard service of the Russian Armed Forces

The Charter of garrison and guard service is the general governing document for the Russian Armed Forces, regulating the functioning of the guard. In Russia and some other post-Soviet states the legislation in force is based the Soviet Armed Forces traditions is taken as a basis, accordingly, its basis was the charter of garrison and guard service of the Imperial Russian Army. The charter contains a complete list of duties of persons included in the guards, the procedure for actions to protect objects, the procedure for guard mounting and changing, the order of subordination and reporting on guard duty, the organization of guard duty, requirements for the arrangement of guarded objects and much more.

== Guard composition ==
The guard includes the following officials:

- Guard chief
- Assistant guard chief
- Assistant guard chief (operator) for technical security equipment
- Guard leader
- Sentry (guard on duty)
- Vehicle driver
- Withdrawal (for guard at the guardhouse)
