= Ménage (disambiguation) =

Ménage or Tenue de soirée is a 1986 French comedy-drama film.

Ménage may also refer to:

- En ménage, an 1881 novel by French writer Joris-Karl Huysmans
- Ménage, a frequent error for manège, a rectangular arena for horse training and dressage
- Ménage problem, in combinatorial mathematics
- In Scotland (where it also spelled as “menodge”): a type of savings club; see rotating savings and credit association (ROSCA)

== People with the surname ==
- François-Xavier Ménage (born 1980), French journalist
- Gilles Ménage (1613–1692), French scholar
- Louis F. Menage (1850–1924), real estate speculator
- Marie Menage (born 1967), Mauritian Olympic windsurfer
- Nicki Minaj (born 1982), Trinidadian-American rapper from Queens, New York
- Victor Louis Ménage (1920–2015), British historian and Turkologist

== See also ==
- Manege (disambiguation)
- Ménage à Trois (disambiguation)
