= Ménage à Trois (disambiguation) =

A ménage à trois is a domestic arrangement in which three people having sexual relations occupy the same household.

Ménage à Trois may also refer to:

== Music ==
- Menage a Trois (album), an album by Baby Bash
- "Ménage à Trois" (song), a song by Alcazar
- "Menage à Trois", a song by trio K-Ram, which featured member Amanda Redington
- "Menage a Trois", a song by Dolour from Suburbiac

== Other uses ==
- Ménage à 3 (webcomic), a Keenspot webcomic began May 2008
- Ménage à Trois, a brand of wine produced by Folie à Deux

== See also ==
- "Ménage à Troi", an episode of Star Trek: The Next Generation
- Ménage (disambiguation)
- Love triangle (disambiguation)
