= Biblioteka Imeni Lenina =

Moscow Metro station

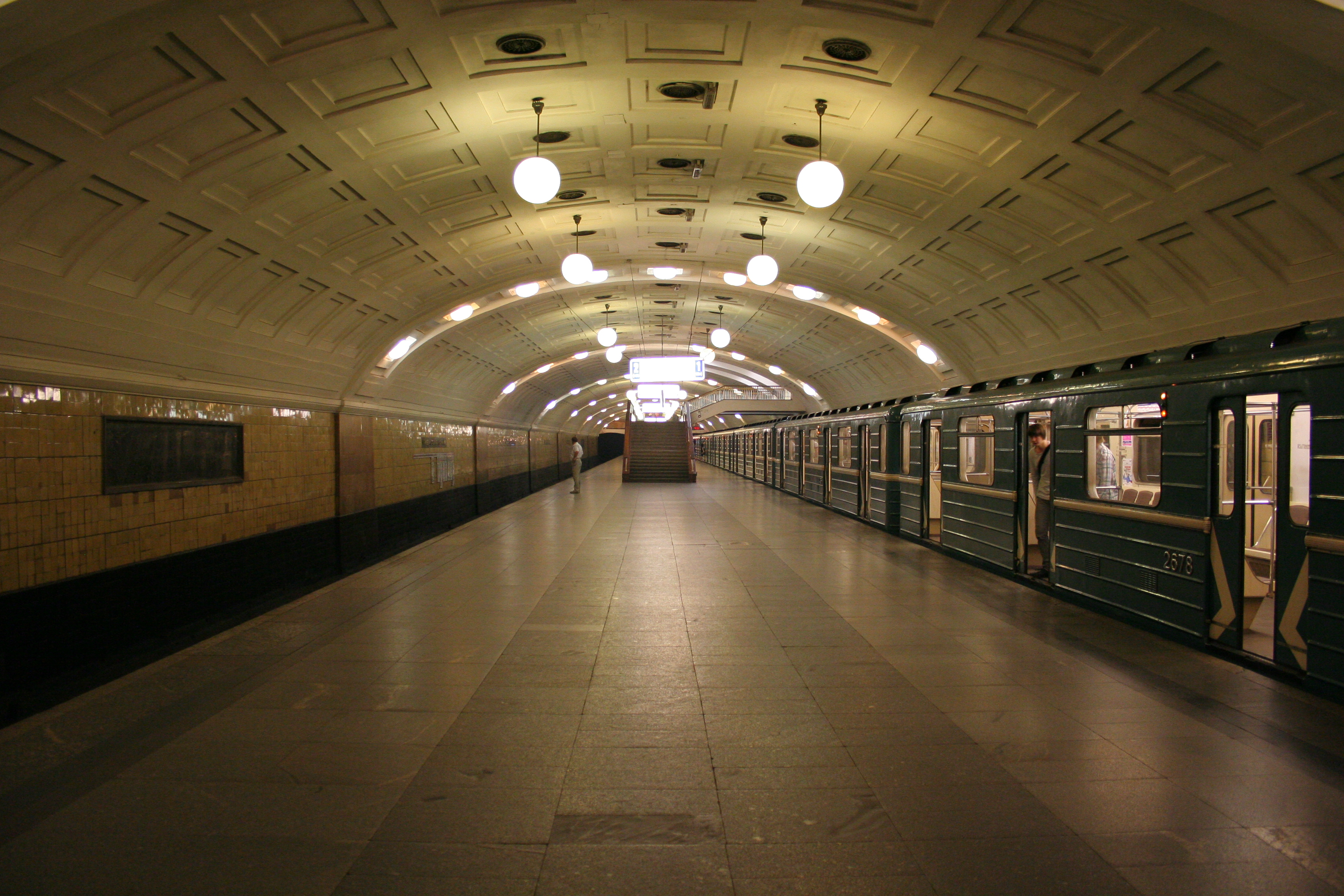

General information
- Location: Tverskoy District; Arbat District; Central Administrative Okrug; Moscow; Russia
- Coordinates: 55.7512°N 37.6100°E
- System: Moscow Metro station
- Owner: Moskovsky Metropoliten
- Line: Sokolnicheskaya line
- Platforms: 1
- Tracks: 2
- Connections: Bus: 144, м1, м2, м3, м6, м27, н2, н11

Construction
- Structure type: Shallow single-vault station
- Depth: 12 metres (39 ft)
- Platform levels: 1
- Parking: No
- Cycle facilities: No

Other information
- Station code: 011

History
- Opened: 15 May 1935; 91 years ago
- Former names: Biblioteka Lenina, Mokhovaya, Rossiyskaya biblioteka

Services
Preceding station	Moscow Metro	Following station
Kropotkinskaya towards Potapovo	Sokolnicheskaya line	Okhotny Ryad towards Bulvar Rokossovskogo
Chekhovskaya towards Altufyevo	Serpukhovsko-Timiryazevskaya line transfer at Borovitskaya	Polyanka towards Bulvar Dmitriya Donskogo
Arbatskaya towards Kuntsevskaya	Filyovskaya line transfer at Alexandrovsky Sad	Terminus
Smolenskaya towards Pyatnitskoye Shosse	Arbatsko-Pokrovskaya line transfer at Arbatskaya	Ploshchad Revolyutsii towards Shchyolkovskaya
Route map
Location
- Location within Central Moscow

Biblioteka Imeni Lenina (Russian: Библиоте́ка и́мени Ле́нина, lit. 'Lenin Library') is a station on the Sokolnicheskaya Line of the Moscow Metro. The station was opened on 15 May 1935 as a part of the first stage of the Metro. It is situated in the very centre of the city under Mokhovaya Street, and is named for the nearby Russian State Library (named the Lenin Library from 1925 until 1992). Its architects were A. I. Gontskevich and S. Sulin.

To prevent the disruption of traffic, Biblioteka Imeni Lenina was built using underground excavation rather than cut and cover even though the station ceiling is just two metres (6.5 ft) below ground level. Soil conditions and the narrowness of the space in which the station was to be built necessitated a single-vault design, the only one on the first Metro line. The entire excavation was only 19.8 metres (65 ft) wide and 11.7 metres (38 ft) high. The main station vault was built from rubble stone set in concrete and reinforced with an iron framework. This was lined with an "umbrella" of bitumen-coated paper to prevent groundwater from seeping into the station. The station was finished with plaster, yellow ceramic tile, and marble.

The station originally had two entrance vestibules, one at either end. The southern vestibule, located between the old and new buildings of the State Library, is shared with Borovitskaya. The temporary northern vestibule, which served Biblioteka Imeni Lenina and Aleksandrovsky Sad, was removed in the 1940s.

== Transfers ==
From this station it is possible to transfer to Arbatskaya on the Arbatsko-Pokrovskaya Line, Aleksandrovsky Sad on the Filyovskaya Line, and Borovitskaya on the Serpukhovsko-Timiryazevskaya Line.

Though Biblioteka Imeni Lenina and Aleksandrovsky Sad (then called Komintern) were built concurrently, they were not connected by transfer passages until 1938, when Aleksandrovsky Sad became part of the Arbatsko-Pokrovskaya Line. Before this the line from Aleksandrovsky Sad to Kievskaya operated as a branch of the Sokolnicheskaya Line.
