= Kropotkinskaya =

Moscow Metro station

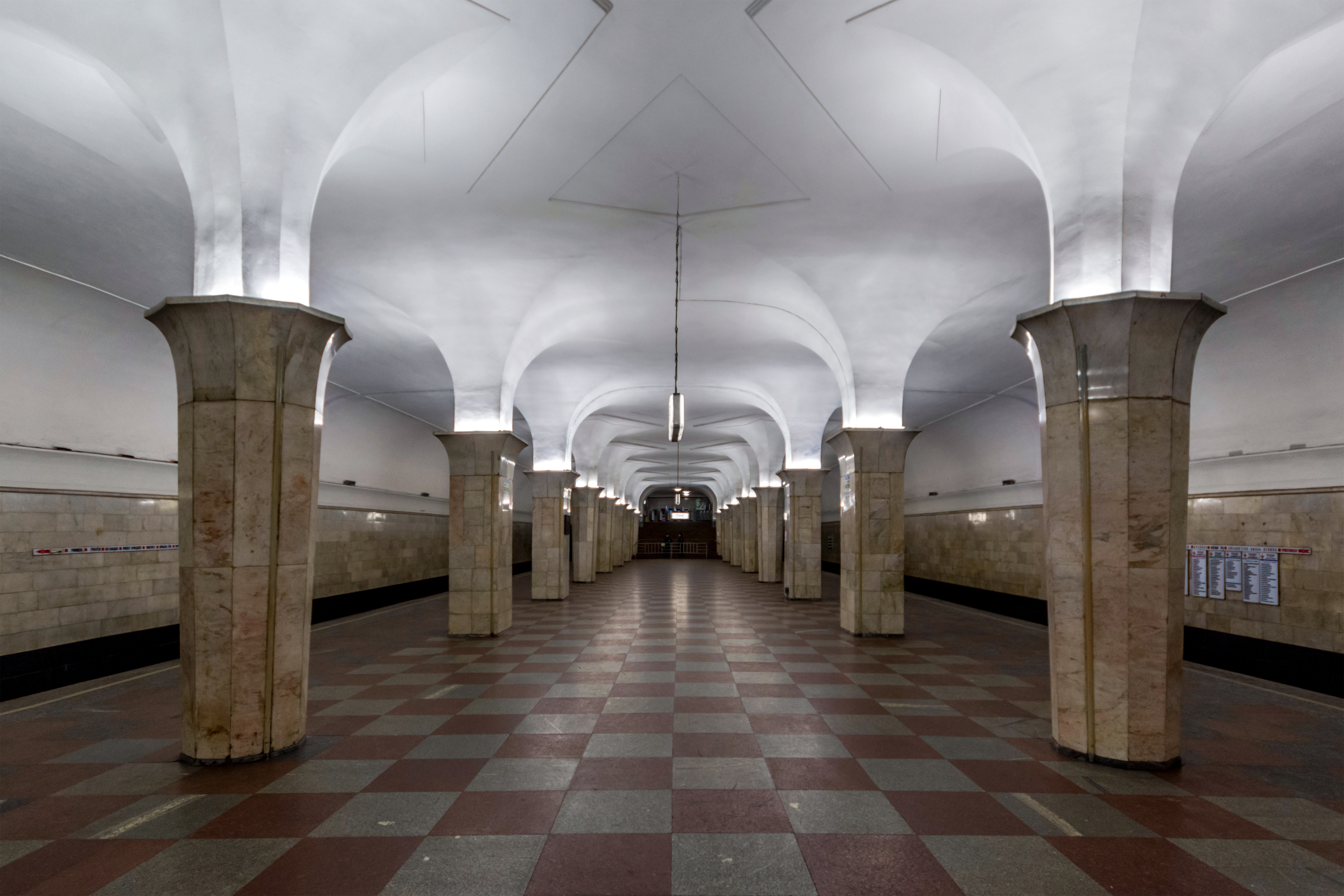

General information
- Location: Khamovniki District; Central Administrative Okrug; Moscow; Russia
- Coordinates: 55.7453°N 37.6037°E
- System: Moscow Metro station
- Owner: Moskovsky Metropoliten
- Line: Sokolnicheskaya line
- Platforms: 1
- Tracks: 2
- Connections: Bus: 5, 015; Trolleybus: 1, 2, 15, 16, 31, 31k, 33, 44

Construction
- Structure type: Shallow column station, tri-span
- Depth: 13 metres (43 ft)
- Platform levels: 1
- Parking: No
- Cycle facilities: No

Other information
- Station code: 012

History
- Opened: 15 May 1935; 91 years ago
- Former names: Dvorets Sovetov (1935-1957)

Services
Preceding station	Moscow Metro	Following station
Park Kultury towards Potapovo	Sokolnicheskaya line	Biblioteka Imeni Lenina towards Bulvar Rokossovskogo
Route map
Location
- Location within Central Moscow

Kropotkinskaya (Russian: Кропо́ткинская, IPA: [krɐˈpotkʲɪnskəjə]) is a station on the Sokolnicheskaya Line of the Moscow Metro. One of the oldest Metro stations, it was designed by Alexey Dushkin and Yakov Lichtenberg and opened in 1935 as part of the original Metro line, named after Russian anarchist Peter Kropotkin.

The station was originally planned to serve the enormous Palace of the Soviets (Dvorets Sovetov), which was to rise nearby on the former site of the Cathedral of Christ the Saviour. Kropotkinskaya was therefore designed to be the largest and grandest station on the first line. However, the Palace project was cancelled by Nikita Khrushchev in 1953, leaving the Metro station as the only part of the complex that was actually built.

Kropotkinskaya was constructed in a massive open trench measuring 176 metres (577 ft) long by 25 metres (82 ft) wide. The tunnels from Biblioteka Imeni Lenina were constructed using the cut and cover technique. The combination of unrestricted space and dry soil made for ideal conditions, and construction of the station took only 180 days from start to finish. Kropotkinskaya was completed in January 1935 and opened five months later, on 15 May 1935. The station was named Dvorets Sovetov until 1957, when it was renamed in honour of Peter Kropotkin, a geographer, philosopher, and anarchist theoretician born in the vicinity.

Since it was to serve as the gateway to the Palace of Soviets, great care was taken to make Kropotkinskaya suitably elegant and impressive. The station has flared columns faced with white marble which are said to have been inspired by the Temple of Amun at Karnak. Contrary to popular opinion, the marble used in the station did not come from the demolished Cathedral. The spacious platform is covered with squares of gray and red granite and the walls, originally tiled, are now faced with white Koyelga marble. The station is illuminated by concealed lamps set into the tops of the columns.

A model of the station won two Grand Prix awards at expositions in Paris (1937) and Brussels (1958). In March 1941 the designers and engineers were also awarded the Stalin prize of the USSR of the second order for architecture and construction.

Kropotkinskaya opened with only one entrance vestibule, located at the end of Gogolevskiy Boulevard. This U-shaped structure was designed by S.M. Kravets and features two separate pavilions joined by a central arch. In late 1950s the station was given a slight reconstruction replacing the original cast of the upper pillars was replaced by marble and the floor was relayed with granite. The reconstruction finished with a new entrance which faces the Cathedral and Moskva River which was opened on 16 July 1960.

Because of the demise of the Palace of Soviets project, much of Kropotkinskaya's planned ridership never materialized. As of 2013 the station serves about 42,050 passengers daily, many of them tourists visiting the newly rebuilt Cathedral or the Pushkin Museum of Fine Arts.

In a long-term future, a transfer to the Kalininskaya Line is planned to open. The future station will be called Volkhonka.

== Gallery ==
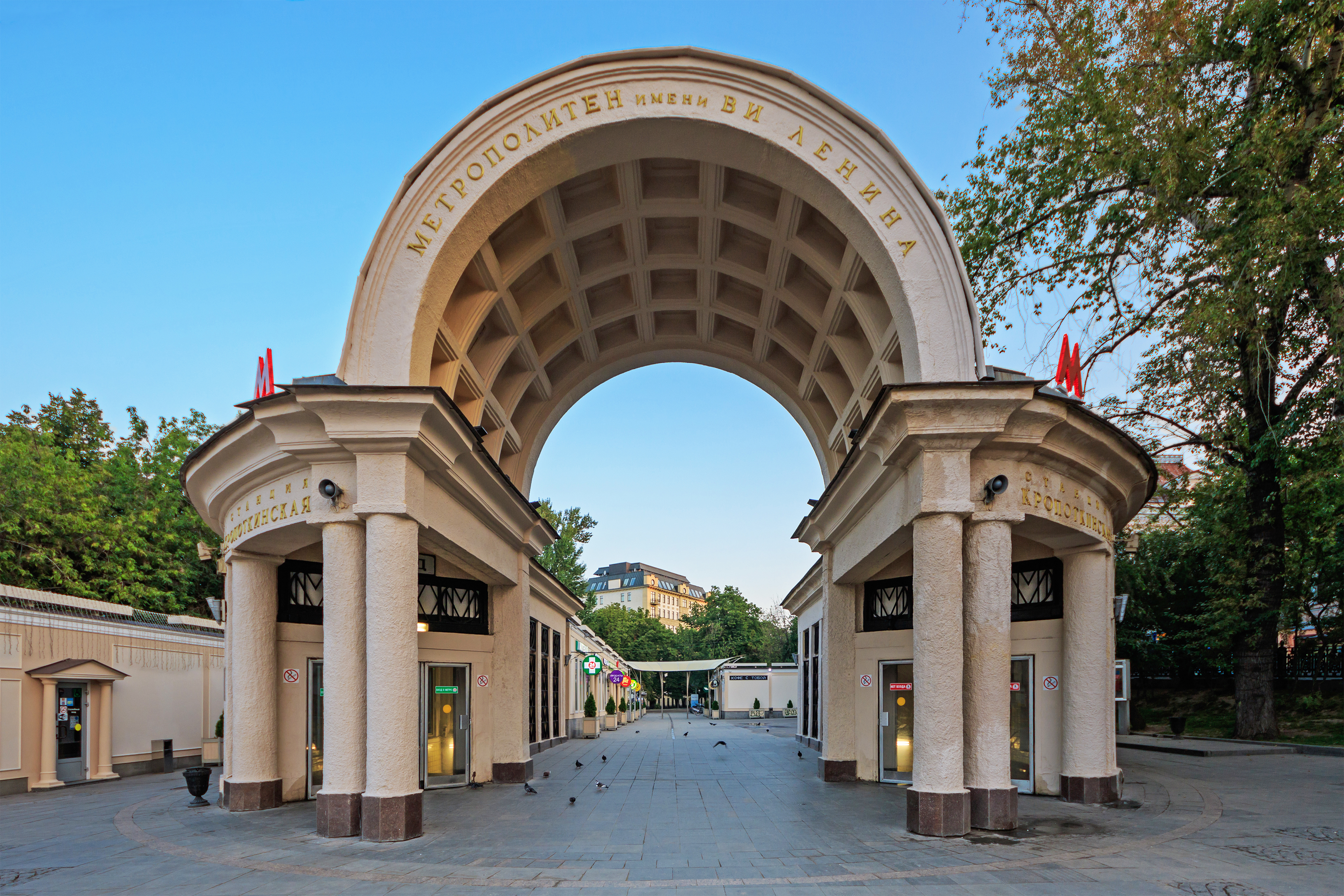
Entrance to Kropotkinskaya

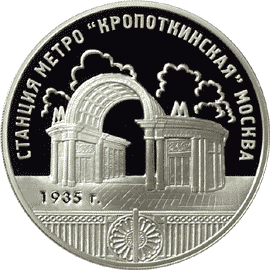
Coin Bank of Russia – Series: "The monuments of Russian architecture", Metro "Kropotkin", Moscow, 3 BR, reverse

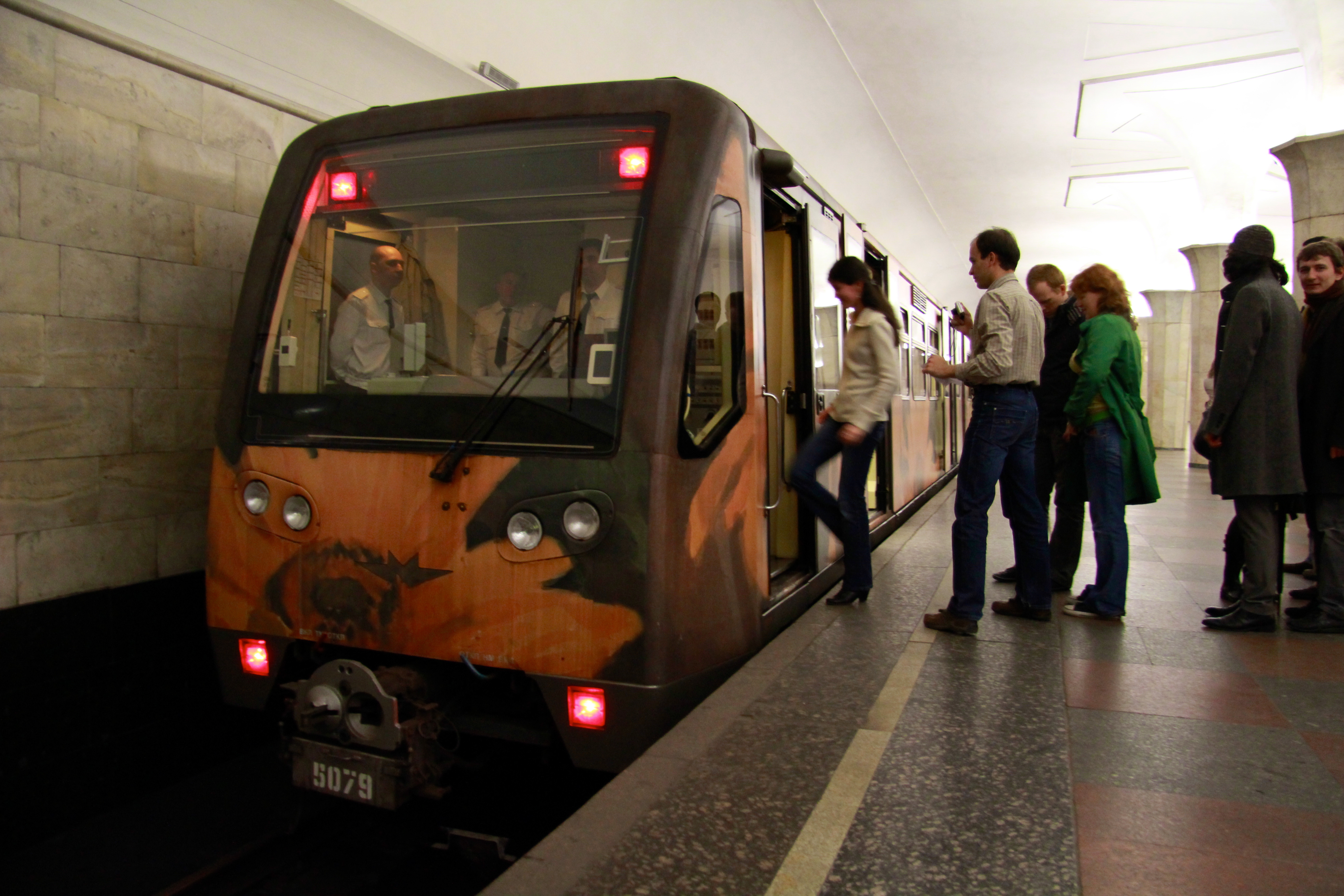
Rusich train at the platform

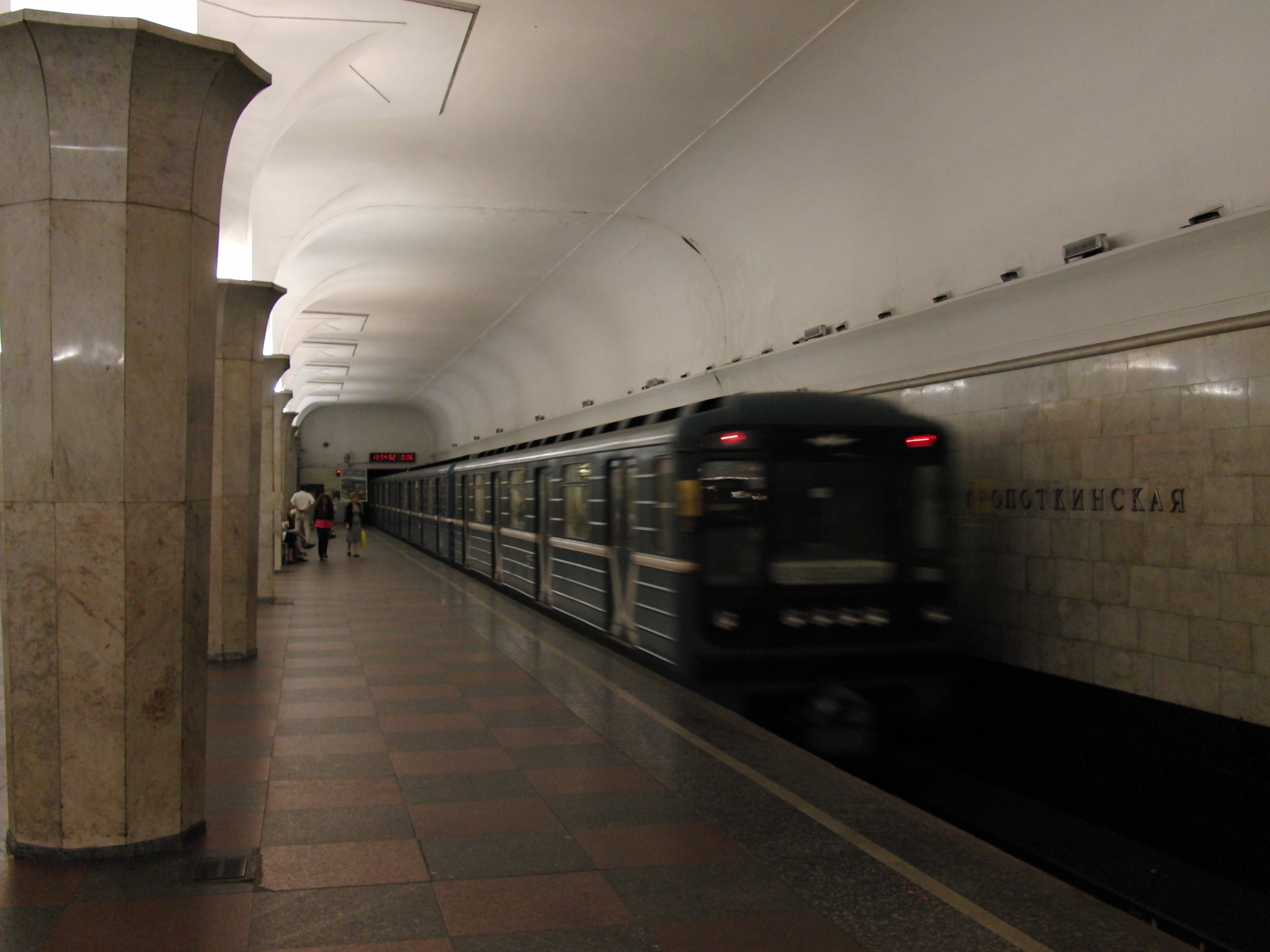
Platform view with an 81-717/714 train leaving

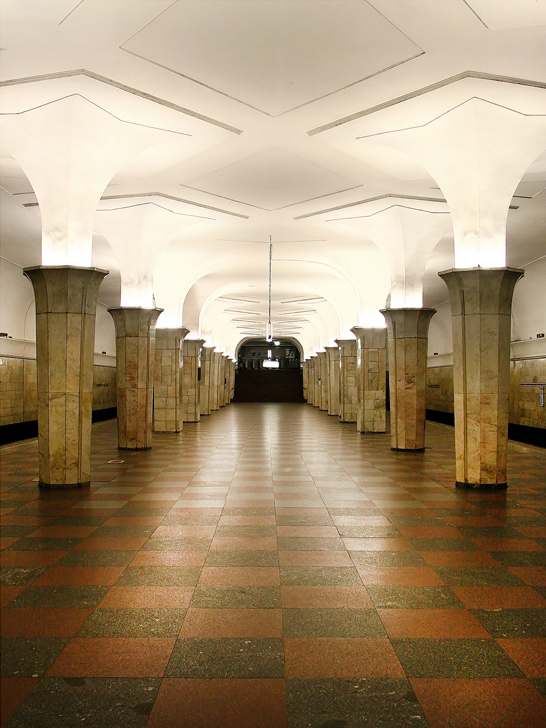

== See also ==
- Louise Michel station
- Ricardo Flores Magón metro station
