= Ploshchad Revolyutsii (Moscow Metro) =

Moscow Metro station

Ploshchad Revolyutsii Площадь Революции
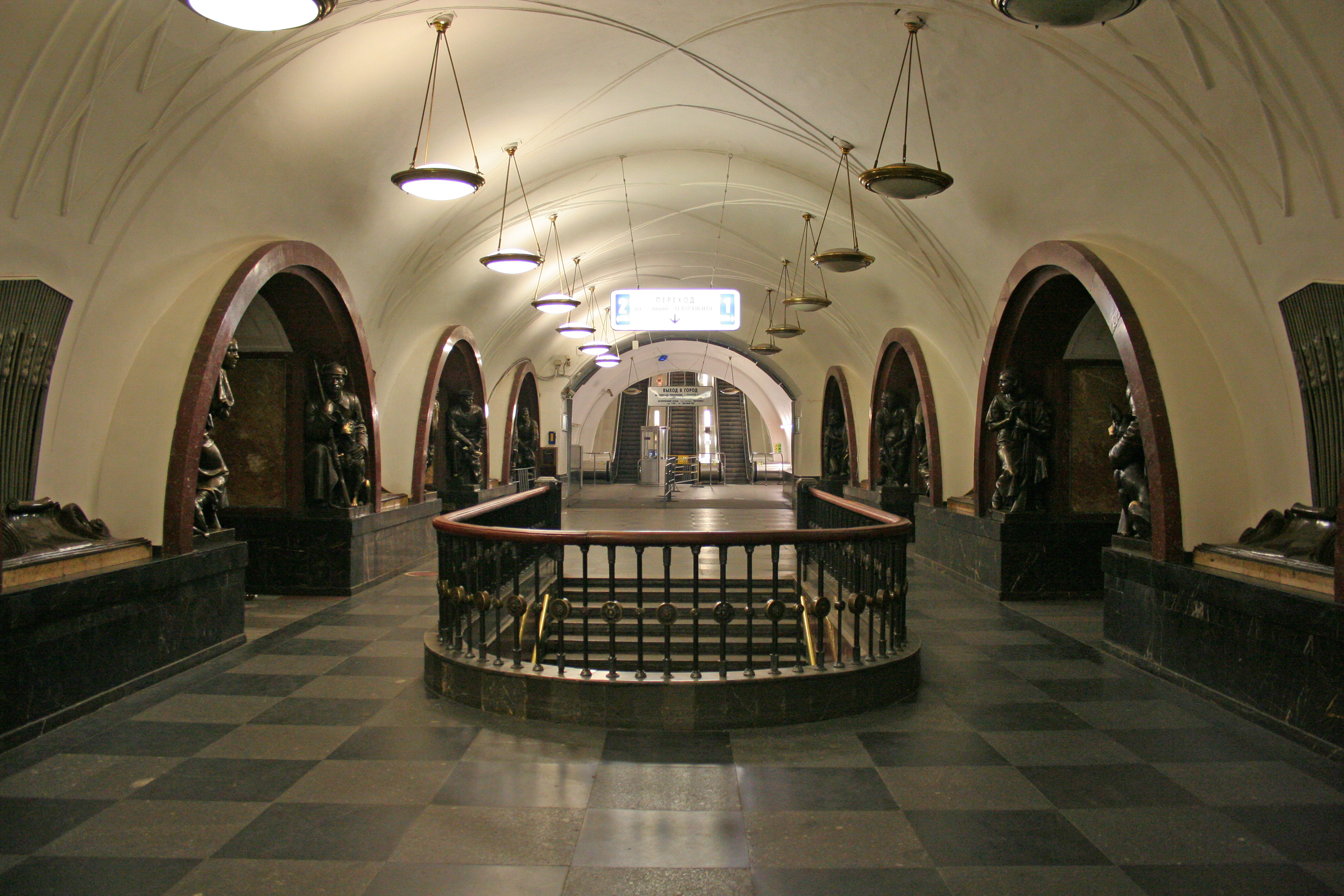

General information
- Location: Tverskoy District; Central Administrative Okrug; Moscow; Russia
- Coordinates: 55.7566°N 37.6216°E
- System: Moscow Metro station
- Owner: Moskovsky Metropoliten
- Line: Arbatsko-Pokrovskaya line
- Platforms: 1 island platform
- Tracks: 2

Construction
- Structure type: Pylon station
- Depth: 33.6 metres (110 ft)
- Platform levels: 1
- Parking: No
- Architect: Alexey Dushkin
- Architectural style: Stalinist Architecture, Socialist Realism

Other information
- Station code: 045

History
- Opened: 13 March 1938; 88 years ago

Services
Preceding station	Moscow Metro	Following station
Arbatskaya towards Pyatnitskoye Shosse	Arbatsko-Pokrovskaya line	Kurskaya towards Shchyolkovskaya
Tverskaya towards Khovrino	Zamoskvoretskaya line transfer at Teatralnaya	Novokuznetskaya towards Alma-Atinskaya
Biblioteka Imeni Lenina towards Potapovo	Sokolnicheskaya line via Teatralnaya platform transfer at Okhotny Ryad	Lubyanka towards Bulvar Rokossovskogo
Route map
Location
- Location within Central Moscow

Ploshchad Revolyutsii (Russian: Площадь Революции) is a station of the Moscow Metro system, in the Tverskoy District of central Moscow, Russia. The station is on the Arbatsko-Pokrovskaya Line and named after Revolution Square (Resurrection Square until 1918), under which it is located.

== History ==
When the Arbatsko-Pokrovskaya Line was first built, the tracks from Ploshchad Revolyutsii extended westward to Aleksandrovsky Sad rather than Arbatskaya. When the westward extension of the line was completed in 1953, trains were rerouted through the new segment.

=== Architecture ===
The station opened in 1938, its architect was Alexey Dushkin. The station features red and yellow marble arches resting on low pylons faced with black Armenian marble. The spaces between the arches are partially filled by decorative ventilation grilles and ceiling tracery.

=== Sculptures ===
The station contains 76 statues in the socialist realism style. Originally, 80 sculptures were created for the space—10 pairs, each replicated 4 times throughout the station. Today, nine pairs are in the archways, and a copy of the final pair ("The Pioneers") appears on each of the two platforms, bringing the total number of statues to 76. Each arch is flanked by a pair of bronze sculptures by Matvey Manizer depicting the people of the Soviet Union, including soldiers, farmers, athletes, writers, aviators, industrial workers, and schoolchildren. The series is meant to be considered in order, symbolizing Russia's transformation from the pre-revolutionary past, through the revolution, into the (then) contemporary era. The order of sculpture pairs are:

1. Male worker-partisan & male enlisted soldier
2. Male agricultural laborer & male sailor with pistol
3. Male sailor & female aviator
4. Male soldier with dog & female sharpshooter
5. Male miner & male engineer
6. Male & female agricultural laborers
7. Female & male students
8. Male football player & female athlete
9. Mother & father in swim clothing
10. Male & female students in Young Pioneers uniforms

Several of the sculptures are widely believed to bring good luck to those who rub them. The practice is targeted at specific areas on individual sculptures, including the soldier's pistol, the patrolman's dog, the roosters, and the female student's shoe.

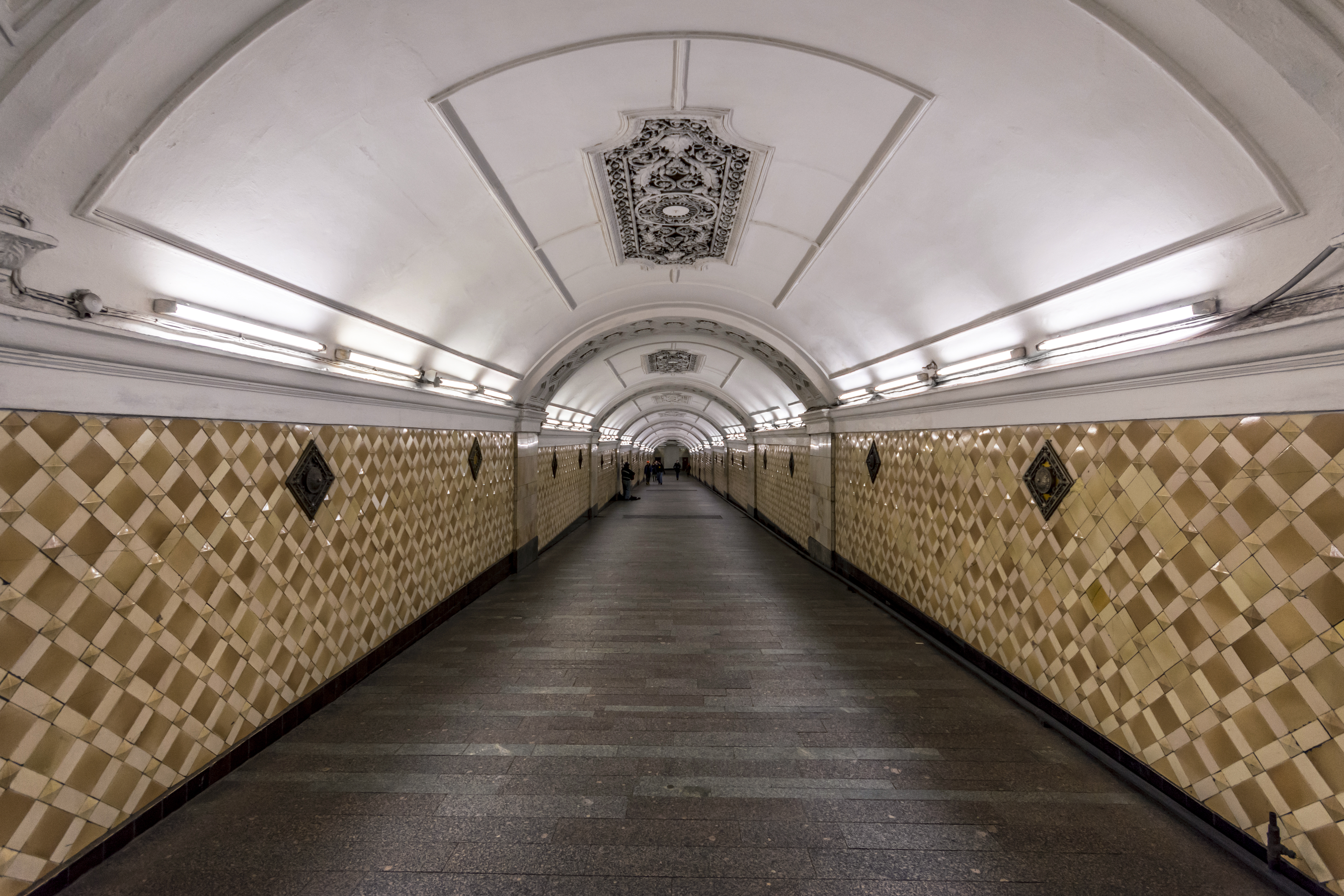
The transfer to Teatralnaya on the Zamoskvoretskaya Line

== Transfers ==
From this station, passengers can transfer to Teatralnaya on the Zamoskvoretskaya Line and Okhotny Ryad on the Sokolnicheskaya Line, but the latter can be reached only through Teatralnaya as there is no direct transfer.

== Image Gallery ==
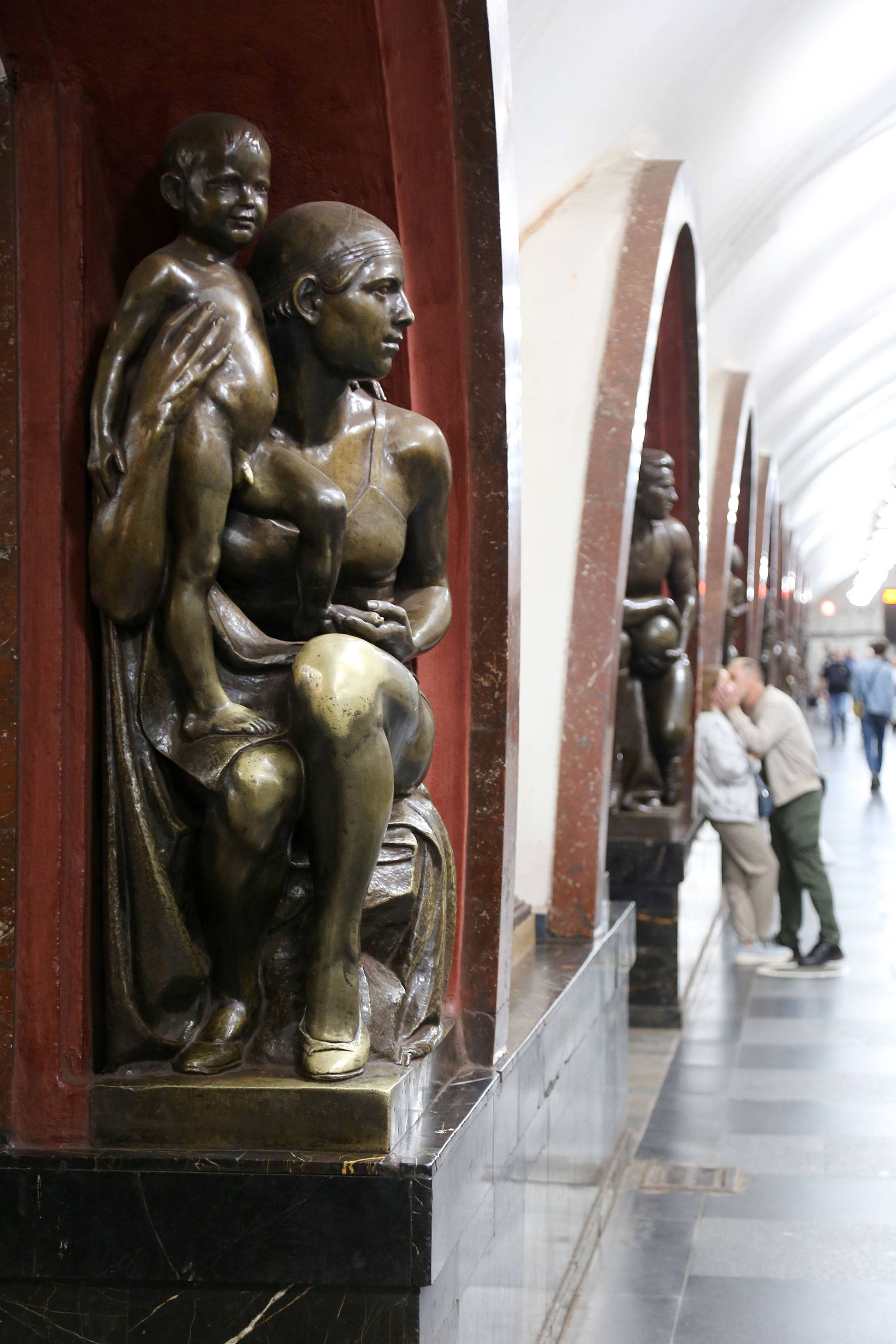
Ploschad Revolyutsii Metro Station, Moscow, Russia
