= Okhotny Ryad (Moscow Metro) =

Moscow Metro station

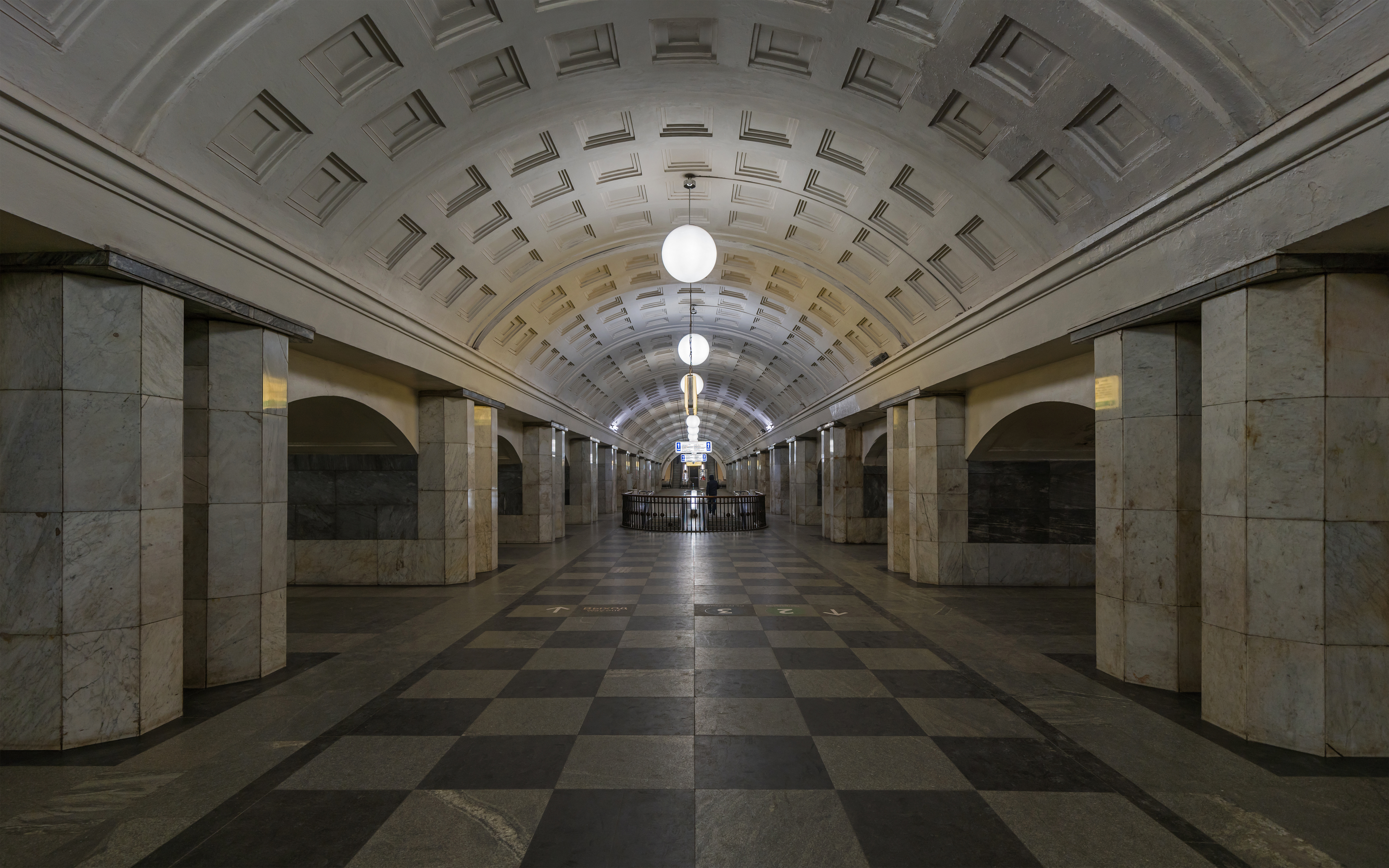

General information
- Location: Tverskoy District; Central Administrative Okrug; Moscow; Russia
- Coordinates: 55.7577°N 37.6166°E
- System: Moscow Metro station
- Owner: Moskovsky Metropoliten
- Line: Sokolnicheskaya line
- Platforms: 1
- Tracks: 2
- Connections: Bus: К, 12ц Trolleybus: 1, 2, 12, 33

Construction
- Structure type: Pylon triple-vault station
- Depth: 15 metres (49 ft)
- Platform levels: 1
- Parking: No
- Cycle facilities: No

Other information
- Station code: 010
- Website: www.ox-r.ru

History
- Opened: 15 May 1935; 91 years ago
- Former names: Imeni Kaganovicha (1955–1957); Prospekt Marksa (1961–1990)

Services
Preceding station	Moscow Metro	Following station
Biblioteka Imeni Lenina towards Potapovo	Sokolnicheskaya line	Lubyanka towards Bulvar Rokossovskogo
Tverskaya towards Khovrino	Zamoskvoretskaya line transfer at Teatralnaya	Novokuznetskaya towards Alma-Atinskaya
Arbatskaya towards Pyatnitskoye Shosse	Arbatsko-Pokrovskaya line via Teatralnaya platform transfer at Ploshchad Revolyutsii	Kurskaya towards Shchyolkovskaya
Route map
Location
- Location within Central Moscow

Okhotny Ryad (Russian: Охотный ряд) is a station on the Sokolnicheskaya Line of the Moscow Metro. It is situated in the very centre of Moscow in the Tverskoy District, near the Kremlin, Manezhnaya Square and State Duma. It is named after a nearby street, whose name literally means "hunters' row".

== History ==
Okhotny Ryad station is located under what was originally the swamplands of the upper Neglinnaya River. Later two ancient churches stood on the site, and their graveyards were excavated during the construction of the station. The station opened as part of the original Metro line on 15 May 1935.

Okhotny Ryad has been renamed more times than any other Metro station. Planned to be called Okhotnoryadskaya, it was opened as Okhotny Ryad instead. The station was renamed Imeni Kaganovicha in honour of Lazar Kaganovich during the brief period between 25 November 1955 and 1957, when its original name was restored. The station's name was changed once more on 30 November 1961, to Prospekt Marksa (the station still contains a mosaic portrait of Karl Marx). Finally, on 5 June 1990, the original name was restored once more.

=== Construction ===
The construction of Okhotny Ryad presented a number of engineering challenges. The task of wedging a metro station into the narrow space between two major buildings, the Hotel Moskva that has been re-built, and what is now the State Duma building, at a depth of only 8 metres (26 ft) without damaging their foundations was further complicated by the difficult soil conditions in the area, including numerous underground water channels. The station was built using a so-called "German" method in which the station walls were constructed above ground and then lowered into the construction site. This helped to brace the foundations of the nearby buildings during the subsequent construction of the station vault and pylons.

The station was originally planned to be a bi-vault design similar to many London Underground stations, but Lazar Kaganovich, who was in charge of the Moscow Metro project at the time, insisted that the station be changed to a tri-vault design after 20 metres (66 ft) of tunnel had already been bored. A major setback occurred when accumulated rainwater broke through the vault before it had been completely sealed and flooded the station. Though no one was injured in the disaster, construction had to be halted while the damage was repaired.

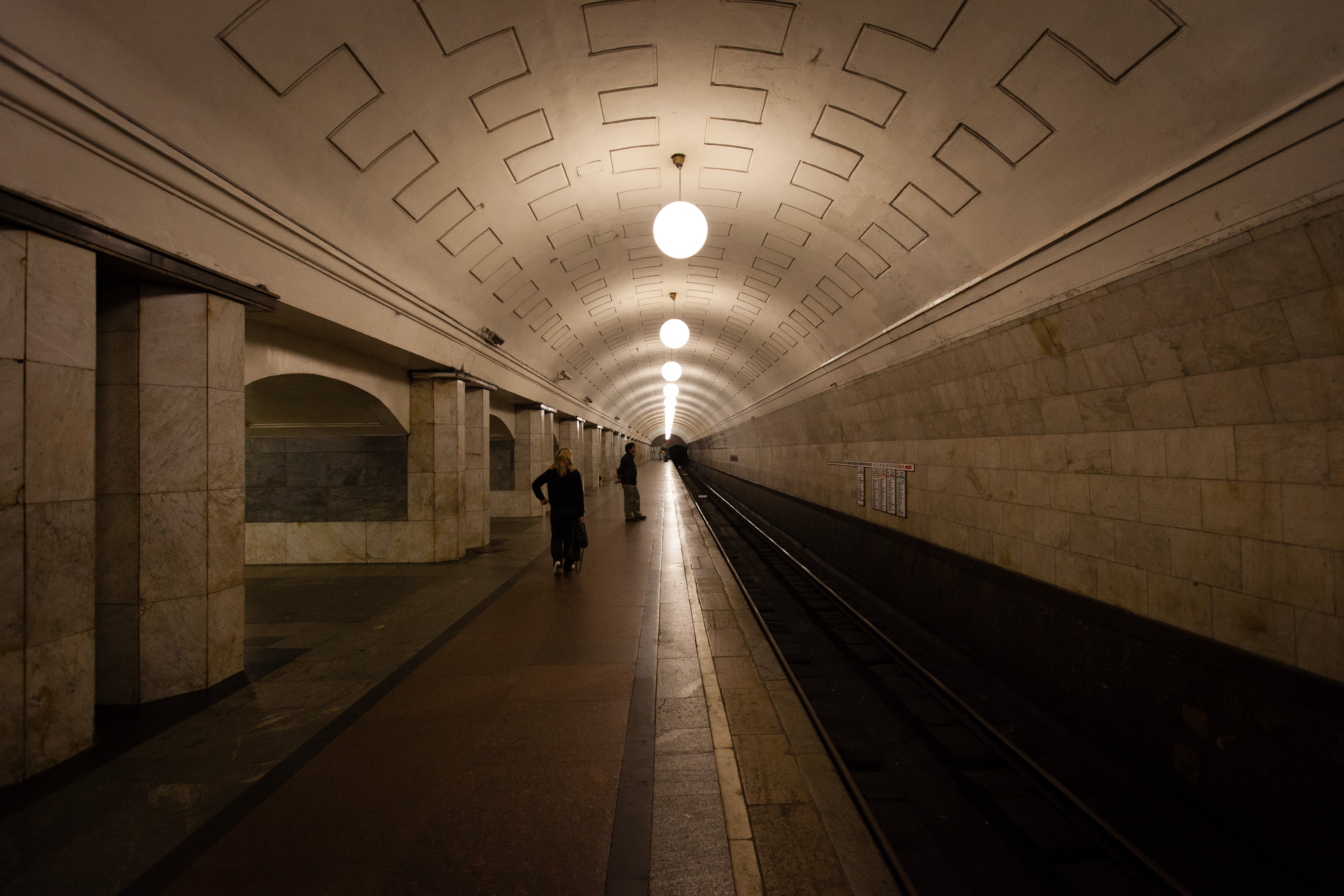
Okhotny Ryad station platform

== Interiors ==
The architects, Yuri Revkovsky, N. Borov, and G. Zamskoy, employed a silvery marble from Italy for the finishing of the pylons, the only documented case where imported material was used in the Metro. The walls are faced with ceramic tile. The finishing of the station, which involved the installation of more than 3,000 square metres (32,000 sq ft) of marble, 20,000 square metres (220,000 sq ft) of plaster, and thousands of square metres of tile as well as lighting and decorations, was completed in just two weeks.

In 2004, Okhotny Ryad underwent a major renovation which included replacing the lighting elements inside the spheres and repainting the plaster from light beige to white. A further renovation took place in 2007/2008 when the old ceramic tiles were replaced by bright marble, though a small tiled section was retained. An average of 42,110 passengers per day enter the station through its vestibules with an additional 241,000 passengers entering via Teatralnaya.

== Entrances ==
The station has two subterranean vestibules, each linked with the platform via an escalator. During the construction of the vestibules, orders of the Moscow's party committee prohibited the obstruction of traffic, so American bridges had to be built over the pits of the future vestibules.

The eastern vestibule, through a mezzanine level is situated on the ground floor of a building situated on the corner of Bolshaya Dmitrovka street, Teatralny Drive, and Teatralnaya Square. The facade of this building was redesigned by Dmitry Chechulin and originally incorporated sculptures of athletes which were modeled after performers from the Moscow Circus. The original three N-type escalators were replaced by ET-5M units in 1997 (9.2 metres/30 ft high). The vestibule also acts as a transfer point to the Teatralnaya station.

The western vestibule's original N-type escalators were replaced in 1990 by the ET-5M series (also 9.2 metres/30 ft high). The vestibule's original entrance was built into the ground floor of Hotel Moskva, on the corner of Manezhnaya Square and Okhotny Ryad street. In 1959 the original structure was expanded with the first of many underground subway networks, and opened on 21 November. Dual descent entrances appeared on both corners of the Tverskaya Street, in front of the original entrance. The tunnel the continued along the facade of the Hotel Moskva, to offer entrance on both sides of the driveway between Manezhnaya Square and Revolution Square (closed to traffic only in 1990s). The final addition came in 1997 when a new underground mall was opened under the Manezhnaya Square, a direct access was made possible from the 1959 network. When the original Hotel Moskva was closed for demolition in 2004, the original entrance on its northwest corner was also demolished. It is unknown whether there are plans to restore it in the new building.

== Transfers ==
Okhotny Ryad station is connected to Teatralnaya station of the Zamoskvoretskaya Line. Originally, when opened in 1938, transfer was only possible via the eastern vestibule. A direct transfer was under construction, but did not open until 30 December 1944. (Note: Some sources say 1940.) It features a long inclined tunnel that descends towards Teatranalaya. As the system grew, the original arrangement proved inadequate to handle the large passenger load and on 7 November 1974 a second transfer tunnel was opened.

Access to both transfer routes is done via escalators in the centre of the platform. The original two tandem N-type escalator pairs were replaced in 2001 by ET-5M series (8.3 metres high). In the mezzanine under the platform the northwards direction carries passenger to Teatralnaya, whilst the southern direction brings them from the station via the older 1940s transfer. Thus the escalators are also one way, with the western on descent and vice versa.

There is no direct transfer to Ploshchad Revolyutsii station of the Arbatsko-Pokrovskaya Line, which must be reached via Teatralnaya station.
