= Kiyevsky =

Kiyevsky or Kievsky (masculine), Kiyevskaya (feminine), or Kiyevskoye (neuter) may refer to:

- Kiyevsky District, name of Kulundinsky District in West Siberian Krai and later in Altai Krai, Russia, in 1935–1938
- Kiyevsky (inhabited locality), several inhabited localities in Russia
- Moscow Kiyevskaya railway station, a rail terminal in Moscow, Russia
- Stations of Moscow Metro:
  - Kiyevskaya (Arbatsko-Pokrovskaya line)
  - Kiyevskaya (Filyovskaya line)
  - Kiyevskaya (Koltsevaya line)
- Kyivska (Kharkiv Metro) (Kievskaya), a station of the Kharkiv Metro, Kharkiv, Ukraine
