= Kiyevskaya (Koltsevaya line) =

Moscow Metro station

Kiyevskaya Киевская
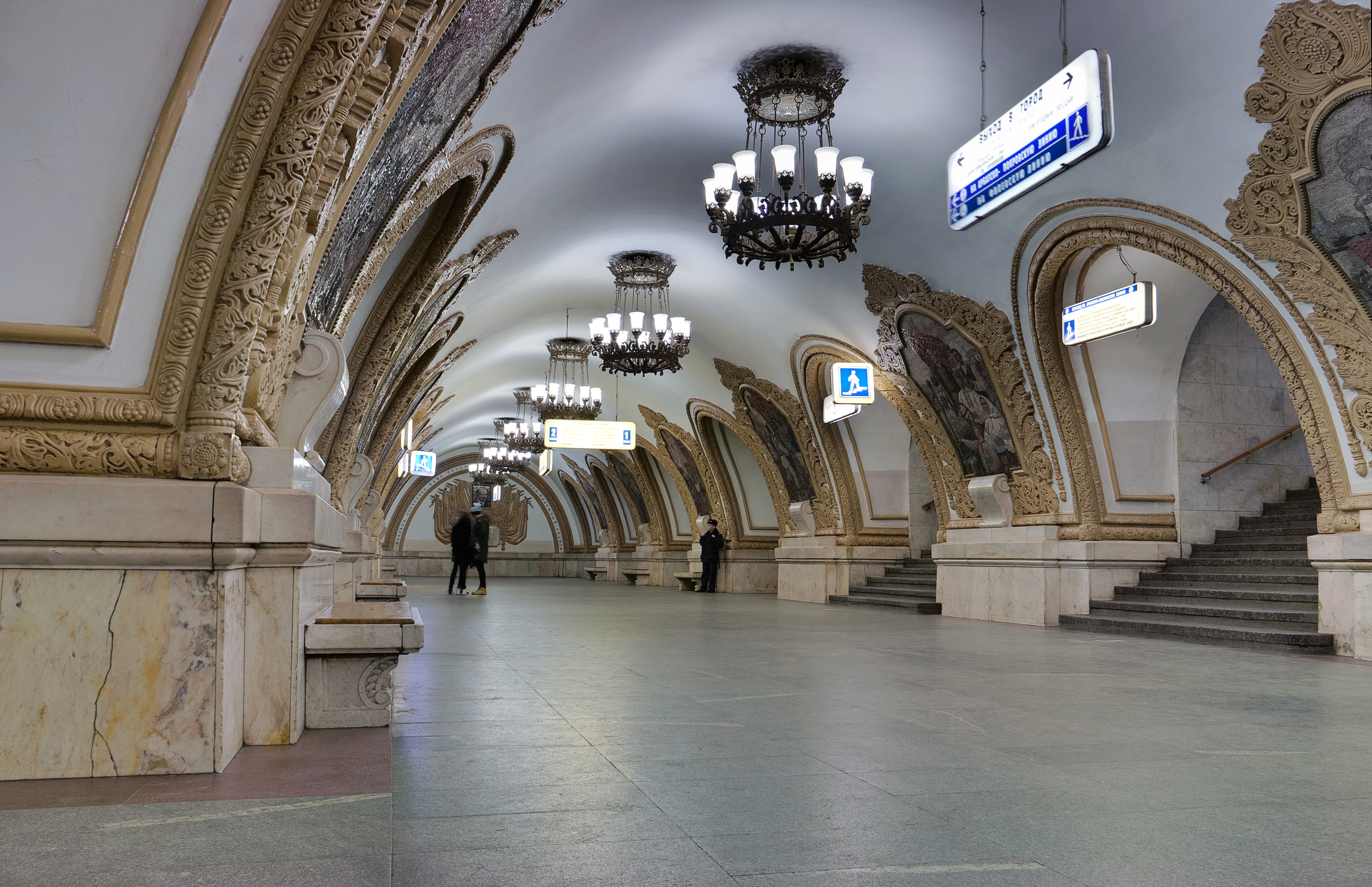

General information
- Location: Dorogomilovo District; Western Administrative Okrug; Moscow
- Coordinates: 55.7446°N 37.5644°E
- System: Moscow Metro station
- Owner: Moskovsky Metropoliten
- Line: Koltsevaya line
- Platforms: 1 island platform
- Tracks: 2
- Connections: Bus: 77, 119, 132, 157, 240, 791, 818, 900; Trolleybus: 7, 17, 34, 39

Construction
- Structure type: Pylon station
- Depth: 53 metres (174 ft)
- Platform levels: 1
- Parking: No

Other information
- Station code: 077

History
- Opened: 14 March 1954; 72 years ago

Services
Preceding station	Moscow Metro	Following station
Park Kultury anticlockwise / outer	Koltsevaya line	Krasnopresnenskaya clockwise / inner
Park Pobedy towards Pyatnitskoye Shosse	Arbatsko-Pokrovskaya line transfer at Kiyevskaya	Smolenskaya towards Shchyolkovskaya
Vystavochnaya towards Mezhdunarodnaya	Filyovskaya line transfer at Kiyevskaya	Smolenskaya towards Aleksandrovsky Sad
Studencheskaya towards Kuntsevskaya	Filyovskaya line transfer at Kiyevskaya	Smolenskaya towards Aleksandrovsky Sad
Route map
Location
- Location within Central Moscow

Kiyevskaya (Russian: Ки́евская) is a Moscow Metro station in the Dorogomilovo District, Western Administrative Okrug, Moscow. It is on the Koltsevaya Line, between Park Kultury and Krasnopresnenskaya stations. It is named after the nearby Kiyevsky Rail Terminal. The design for the station was chosen in an open competition held in Ukraine; the entry submitted by the team of E. I. Katonin, V. K. Skugarev, and G. E. Golubev placed first among 73 others and it became the final design. Kievskaya features low, square pylons faced with white marble and surmounted by large mosaics by A.V. Myzin celebrating Russo-Ukrainian unity. Both the mosaics and the arches between the pylons are edged with elaborate gold-colored trim. At the end of the platform is a portrait of Vladimir Lenin.

The entrance to the station, which is shared with both of the other two Kievskaya stations, is built into the Kiev railway station. With the completion of the segment of track between Belorusskaya and Park Kultury in 1954 the Koltsevaya Line became fully operational with trains running continuously around the loop for the first time.

One of the station's entrances is topped by a reproduction of an Art Nouveau Paris Metro entrance by Hector Guimard, given by the Régie autonome des transports parisiens in 2006 in exchange for an artwork by Russian artist Ivan Lubennikov installed at Madeleine station in Paris.

== Transfers ==
From this station passengers can transfer to Kiyevskaya on the Arbatsko-Pokrovskaya Line and Kiyevskaya on the Filyovskaya Line.

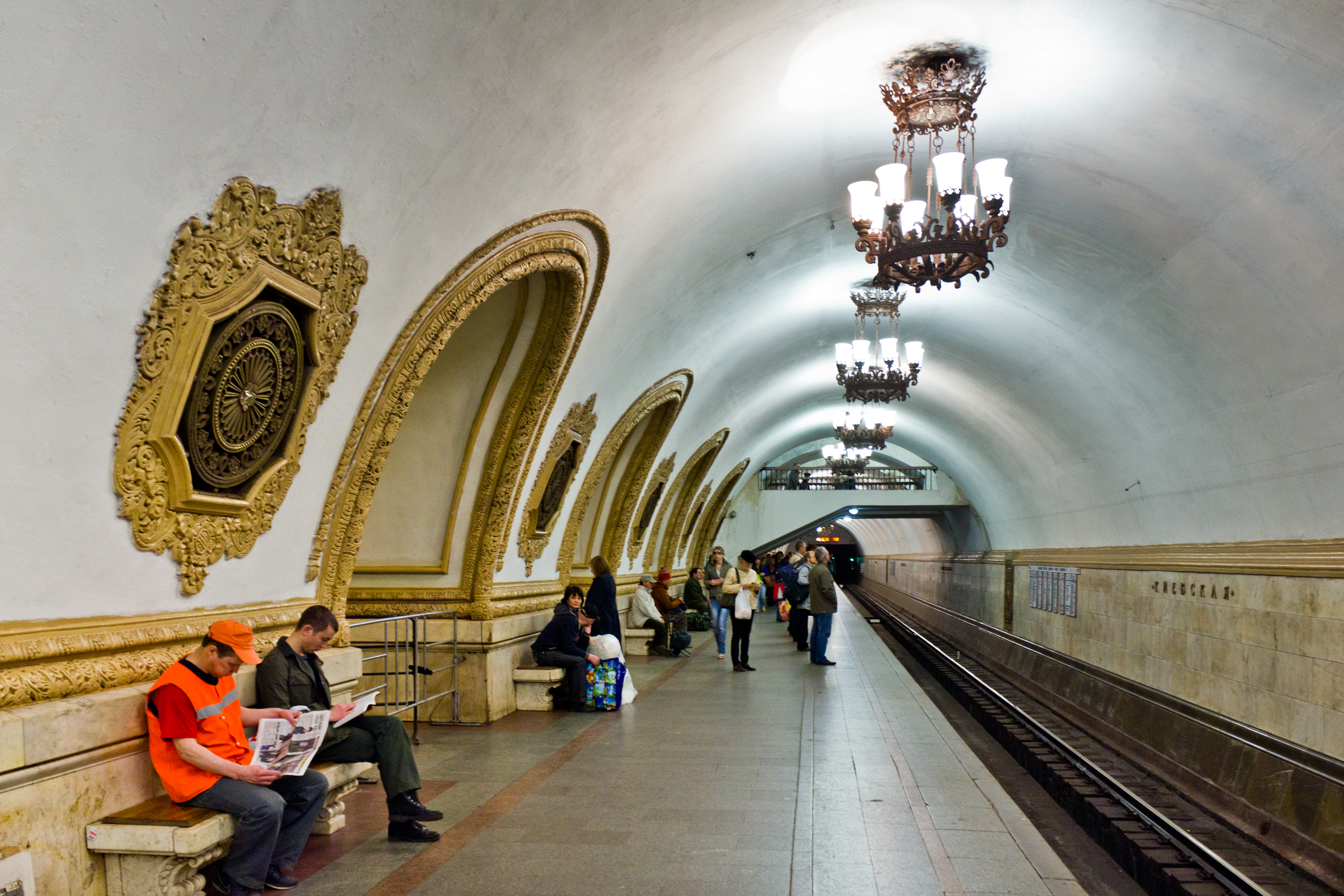
Station platform of Kiyevskaya

== Gallery ==
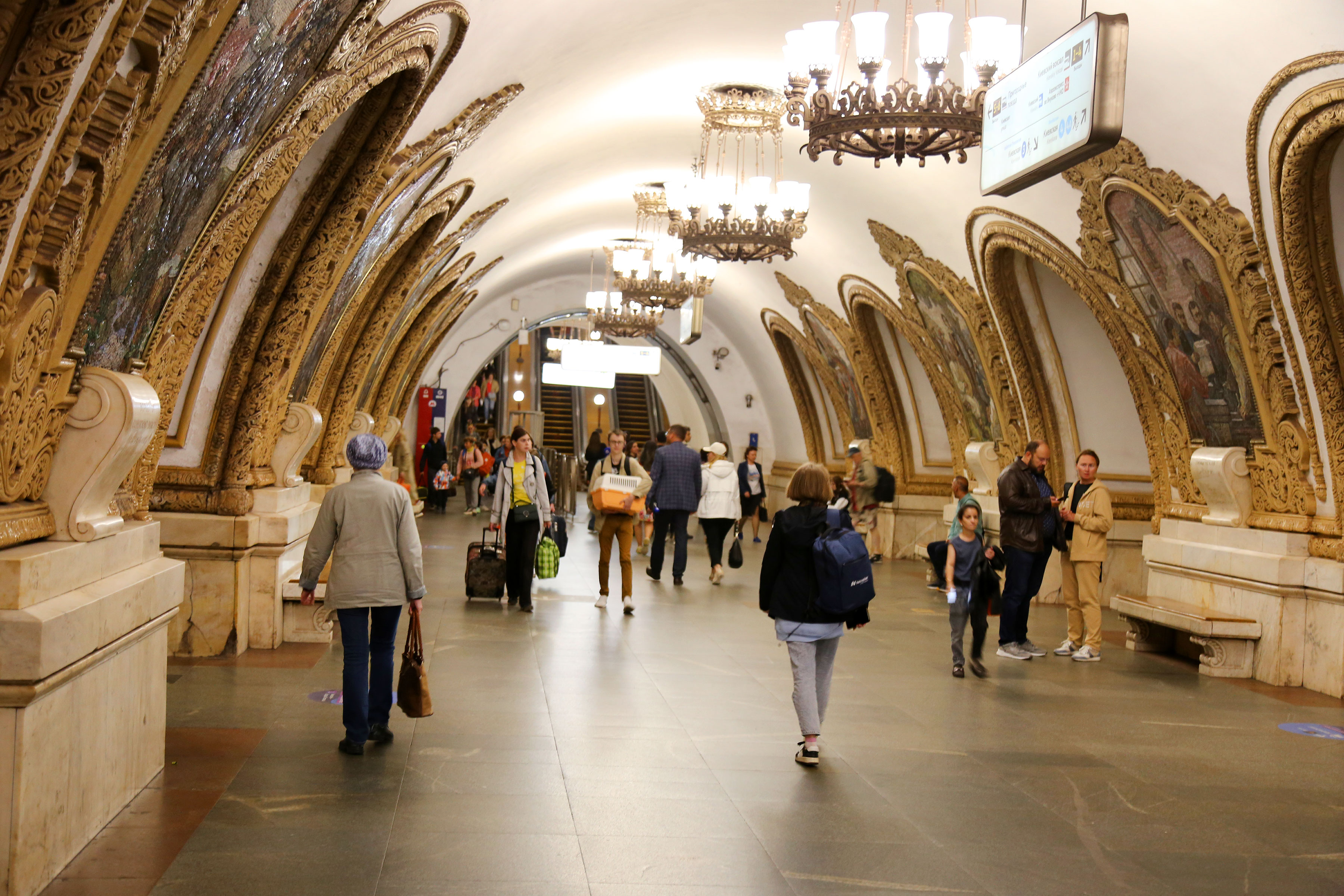
Kievskaya Subway Station, Moscow, Russia

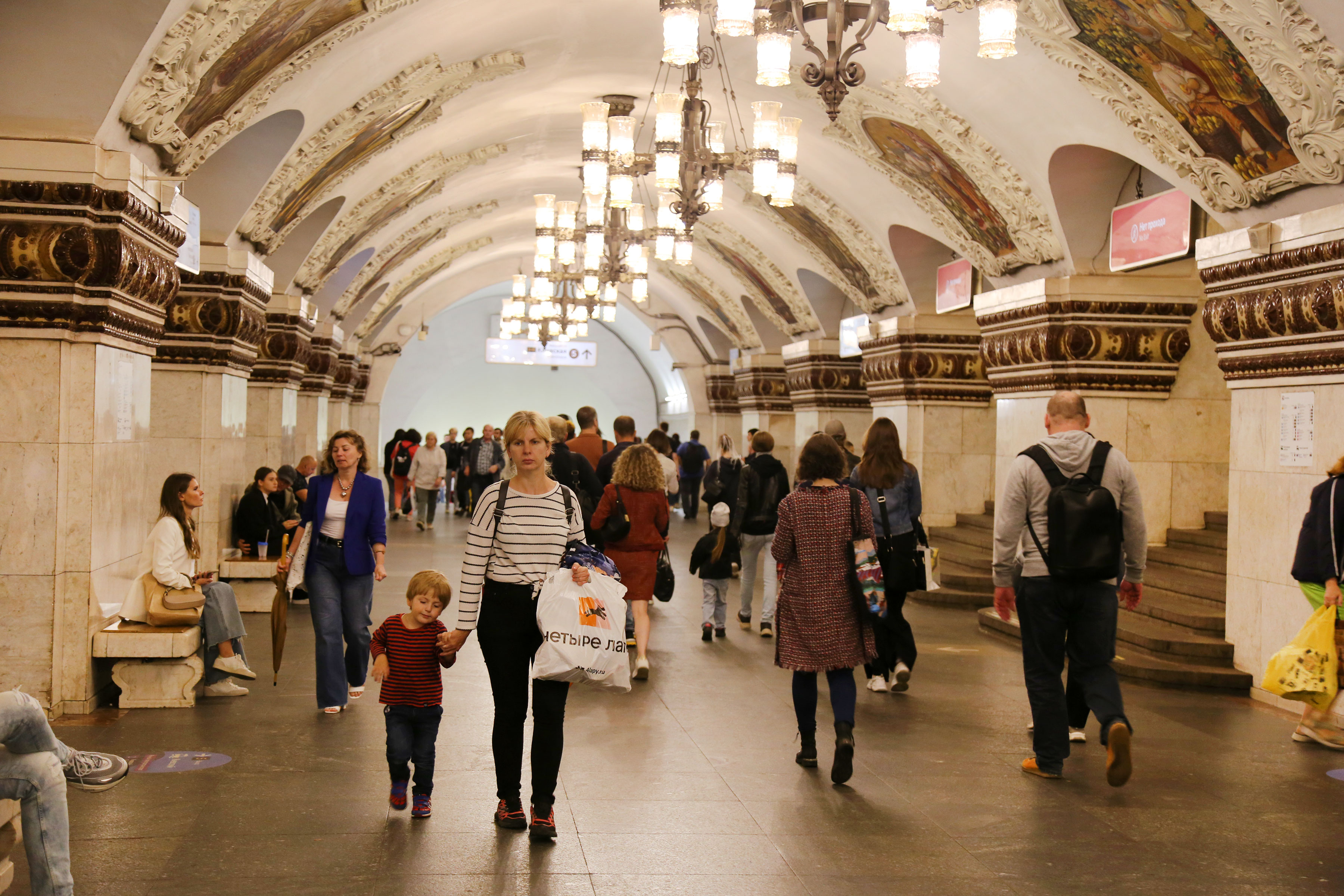
Kievskaya Subway Station, Moscow, Russia

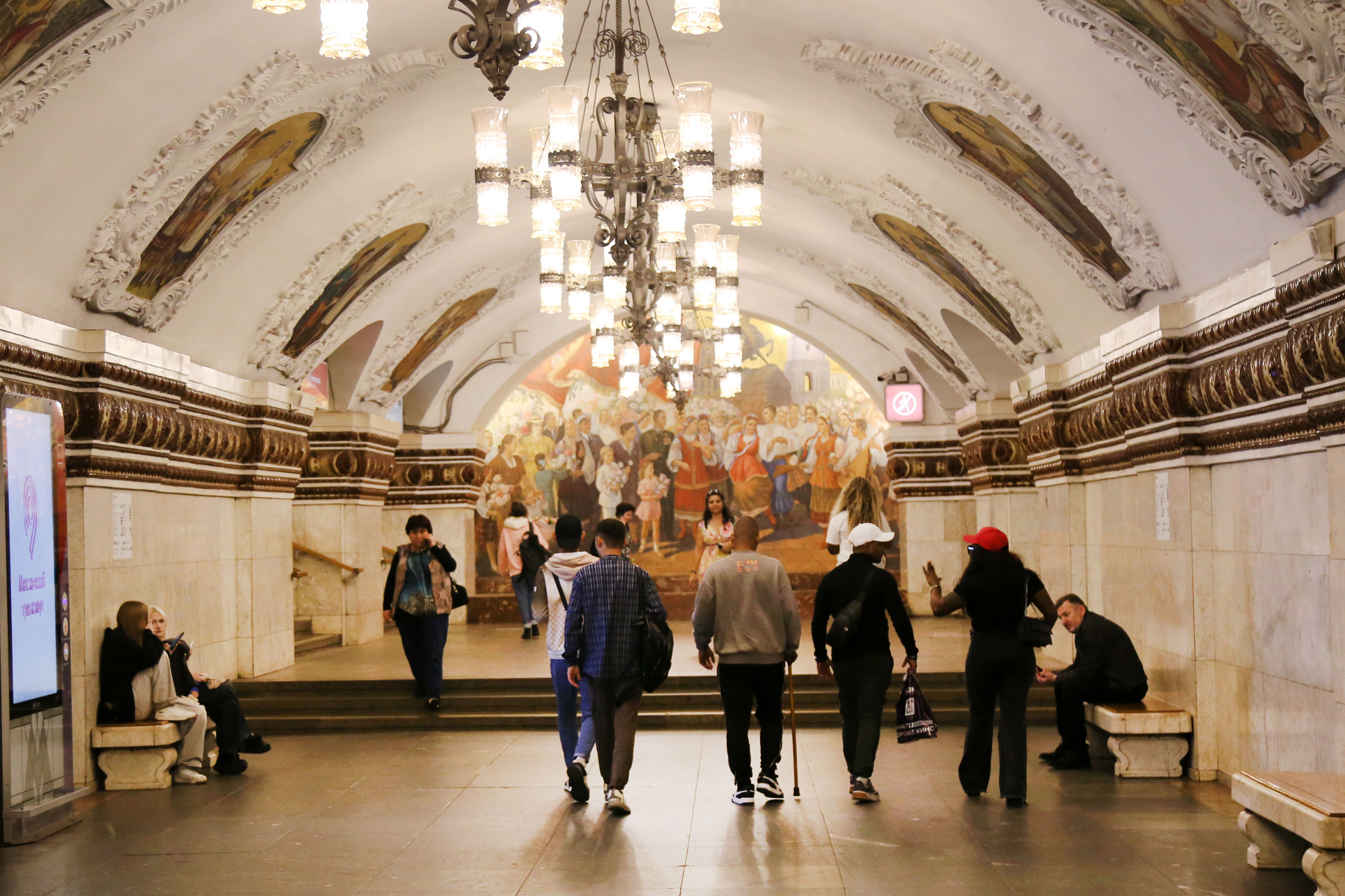
Kievskaya Subway Station, Moscow, Russia
