= Kiyevskaya (Arbatsko-Pokrovskaya line) =

Moscow Metro station

Kiyevskaya Киевская
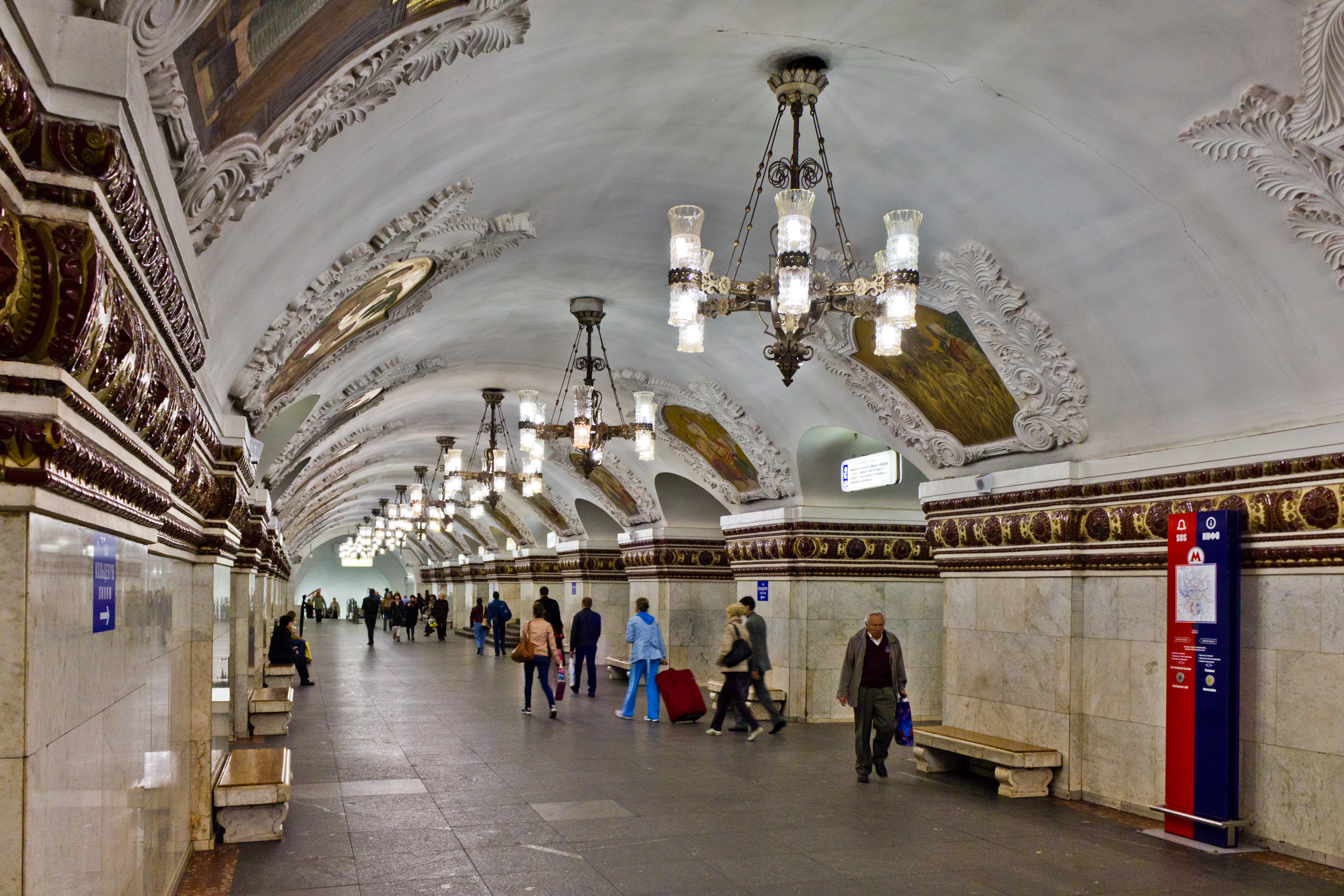

General information
- Location: Dorogomilovo District; Western Administrative Okrug; Moscow; Russia
- Coordinates: 55.7442°N 37.5645°E
- System: Moscow Metro station
- Owner: Moskovsky Metropoliten
- Line: Arbatsko-Pokrovskaya line
- Platforms: 1 island platform
- Tracks: 2

Construction
- Structure type: Pylon station
- Depth: 38 metres (125 ft)
- Platform levels: 1
- Parking: No

Other information
- Station code: 042

History
- Opened: 5 April 1953; 73 years ago

Services
Preceding station	Moscow Metro	Following station
Park Pobedy towards Pyatnitskoye Shosse	Arbatsko-Pokrovskaya line	Smolenskaya towards Shchyolkovskaya
Vystavochnaya towards Mezhdunarodnaya	Filyovskaya line transfer at Kiyevskaya	Smolenskaya towards Aleksandrovsky Sad
Studencheskaya towards Kuntsevskaya	Filyovskaya line transfer at Kiyevskaya	Smolenskaya towards Aleksandrovsky Sad
Park Kultury anticlockwise / outer	Koltsevaya line transfer at Kiyevskaya	Krasnopresnenskaya clockwise / inner
Route map
Location
- Location within Central Moscow

Kiyevskaya (Russian: Киевская), named for the nearby Kiyevsky railway station, is a station on the Arbatsko–Pokrovskaya line of the Moscow Metro. Opened in 1953, it is lavishly decorated in the quasi-baroque style that predominated in the early 1950s. The square pylons are faced with white Ural marble and elaborately patterned ceramic tile and the plastered ceiling is decorated with a series of frescoes by various artists depicting life in Ukraine. A large mosaic at the end of the platform commemorates the 300th anniversary of the Treaty of Pereyaslav, which was viewed by 20th-century Soviet historiography as an act of reunification of Russia and Ukraine. Light comes from a row of hexagonal chandeliers. The architects were L. V. Lile, V. A. Litvinov, M. F. Markovsky, and V. M. Dobrokovsky.

Kiyevskaya has no vestibule of its own. Instead, escalators at the end of the hall lead to Kiyevskaya and thence to that station's entrance, which is built into the Kiyevsky railway station.

For half a century Kiyevskaya was the terminus of the Arbatsko–Pokrovskaya line; the 2003 extension to Park Pobedy ended that situation.

== Transfers ==
From this station it is possible to transfer to Kiyevskaya on the Filyovskaya line and the Kiyevskaya on the Ring.

== Image gallery ==
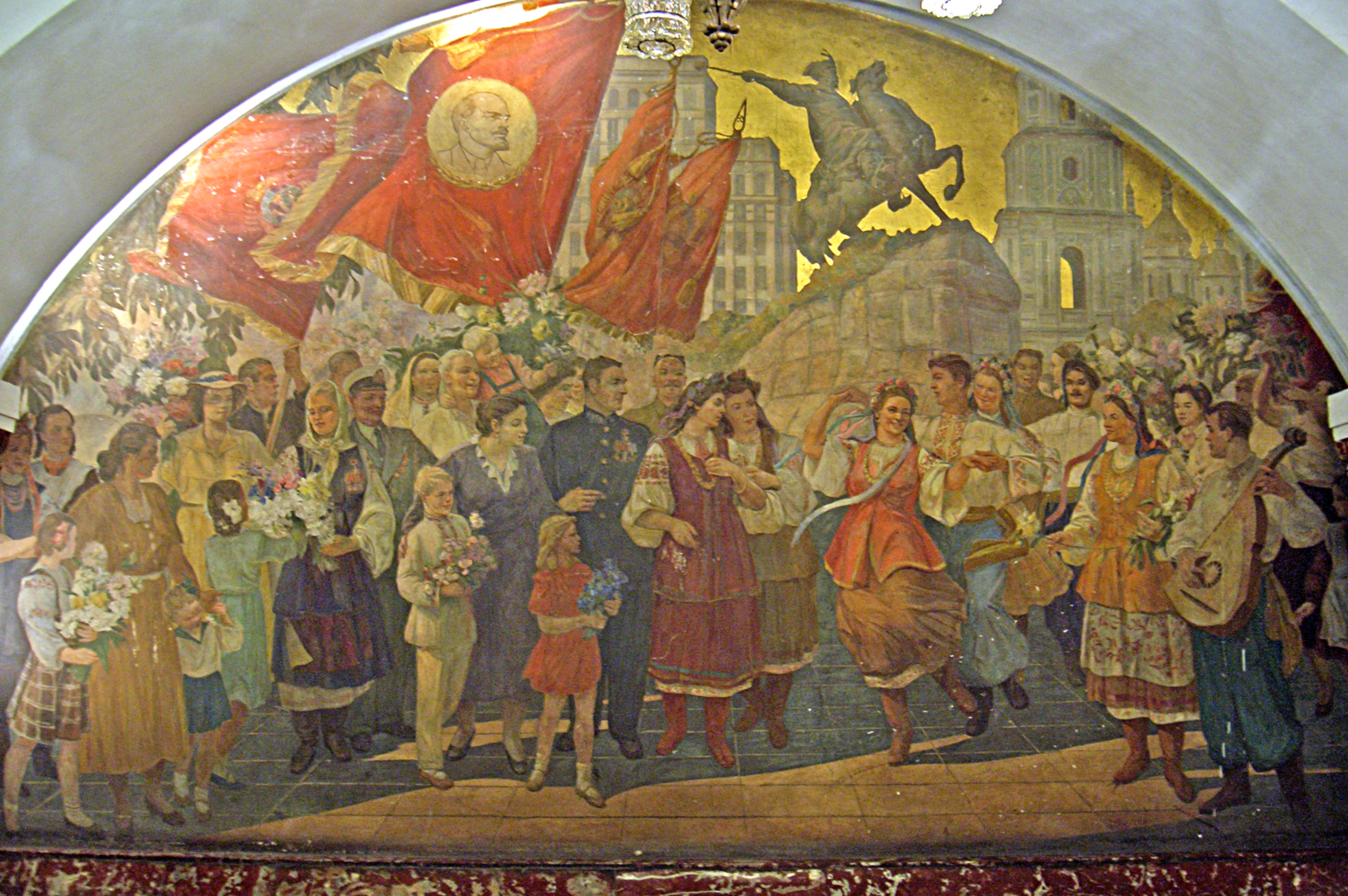
Panel at the end of the hall

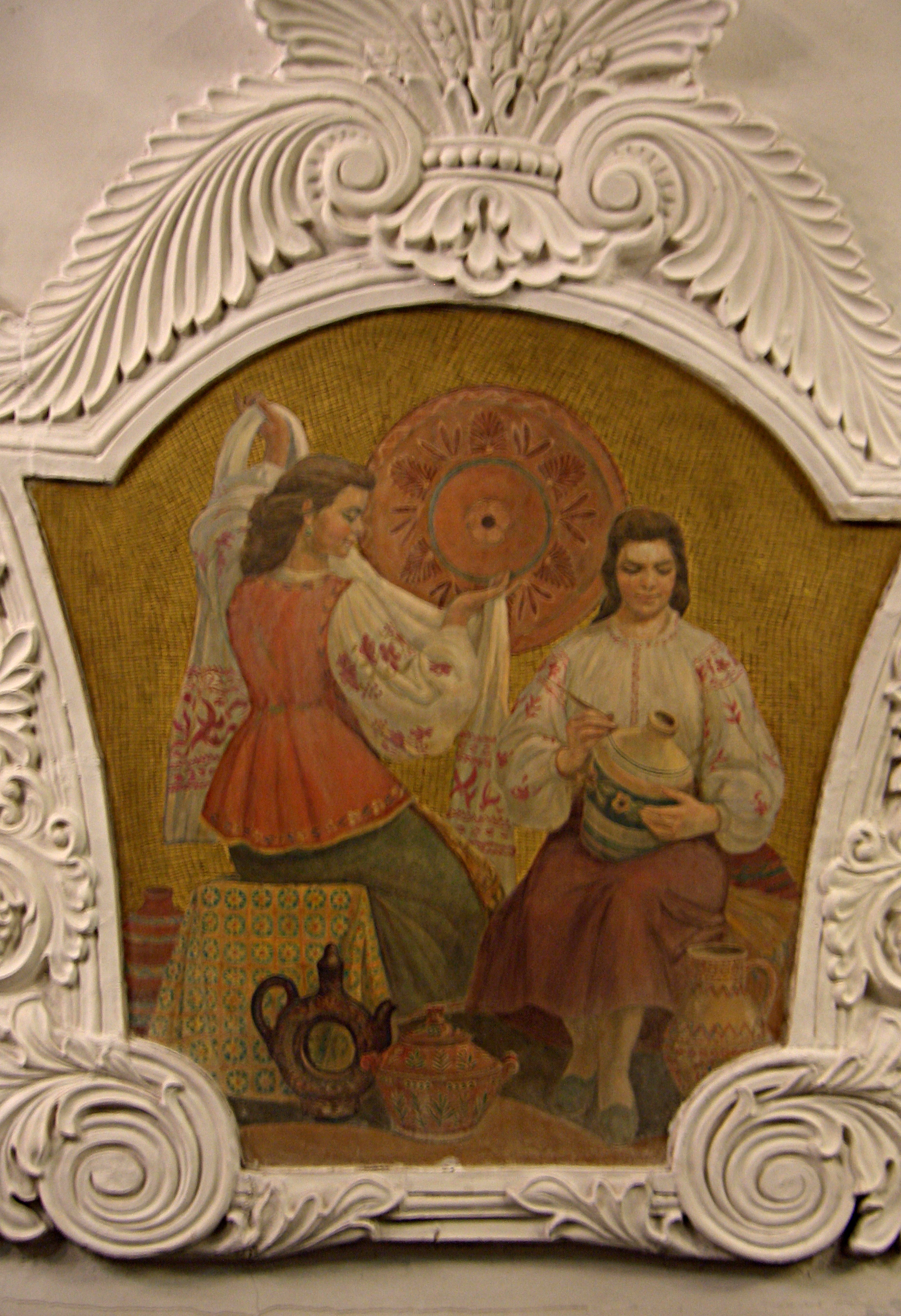
Mosaic

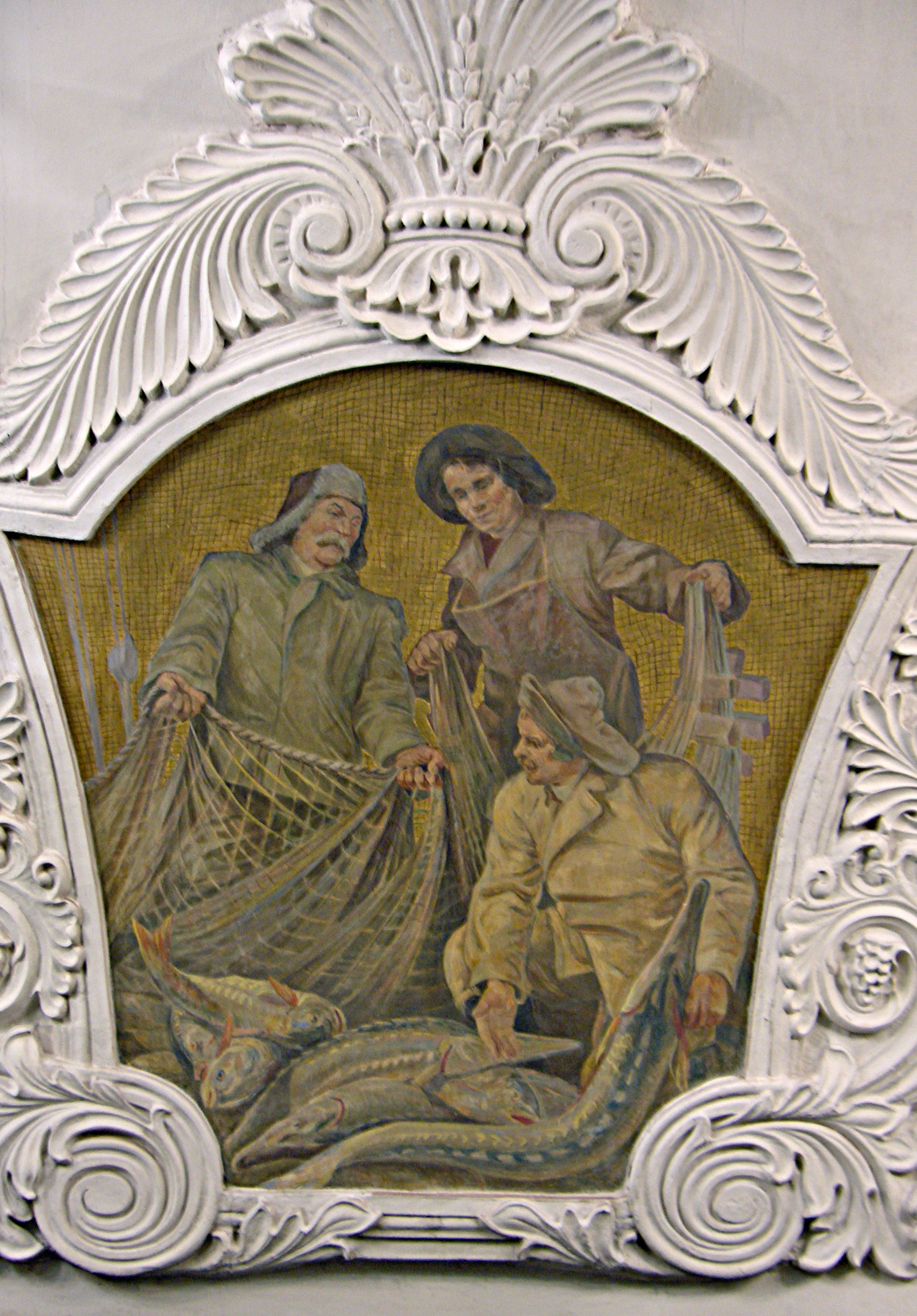
Mosaic

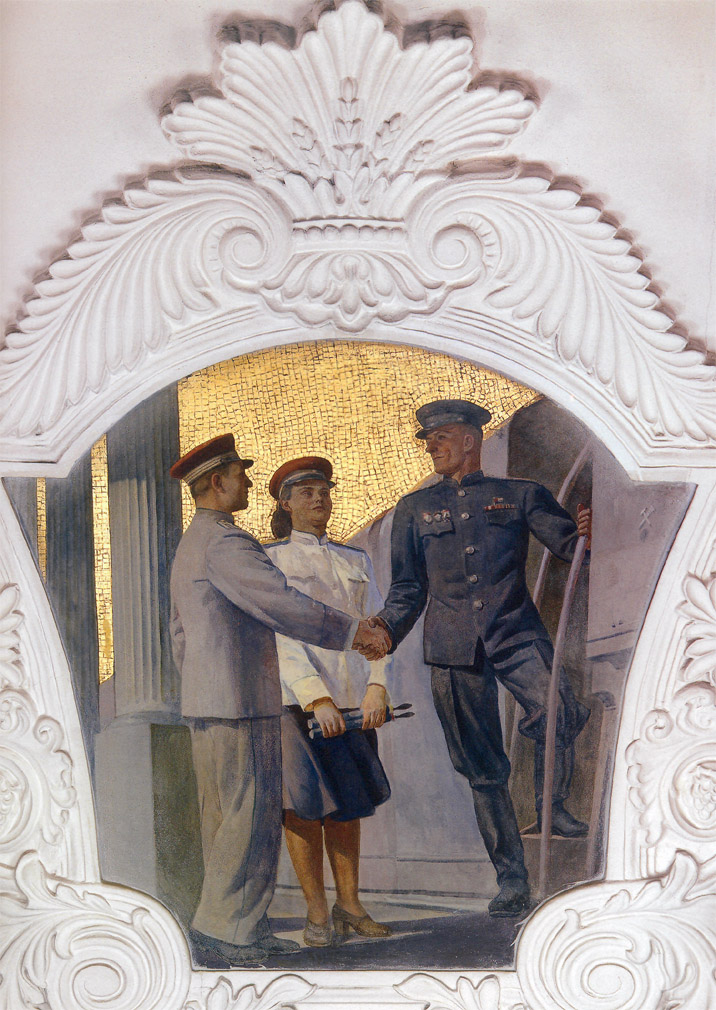
Mosaic

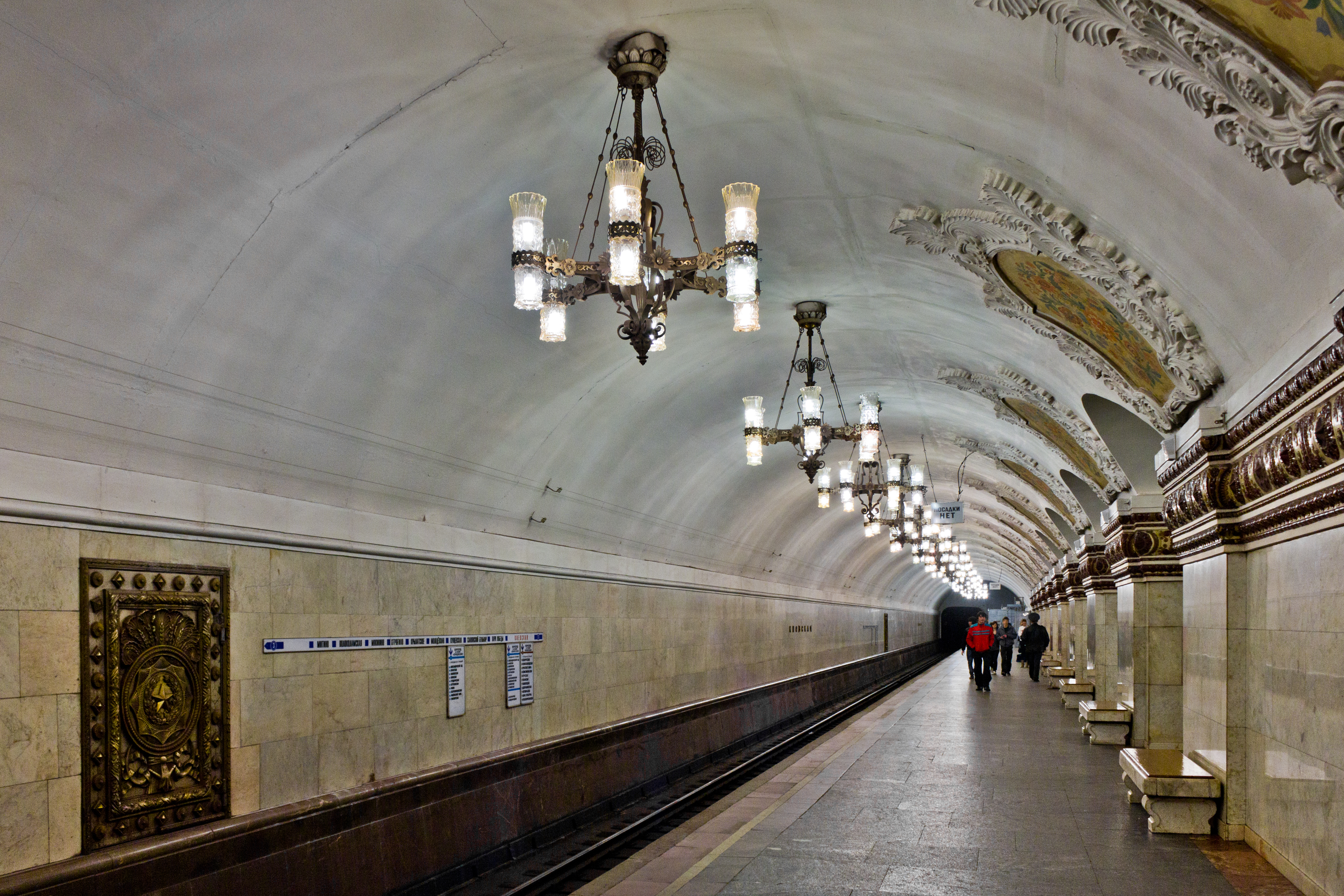
Platform
