= Smolensky Metro Bridge =

Bridge in Moscow, Russia

Coordinates: 55°44.892′N 37°34.4712′E

Smolensky Metro Bridge (Russian: Смоленский метромост, Metromost) is a steel arch bridge that spans Moskva River in Dorogomilovo District of Moscow, Russia. It is the first bridge built for the Moscow Metro in 1935–1937, designed by N.P.Polikarpov, P.K.Antonov (structural engineering) and Yakovlev brothers (architectural design). It is one of two (the second one is Mitinsky Metro Bridge) bridges over Moskva River that are used exclusively by Metro (subway) trains, while the other Metro bridges combine road and rail.

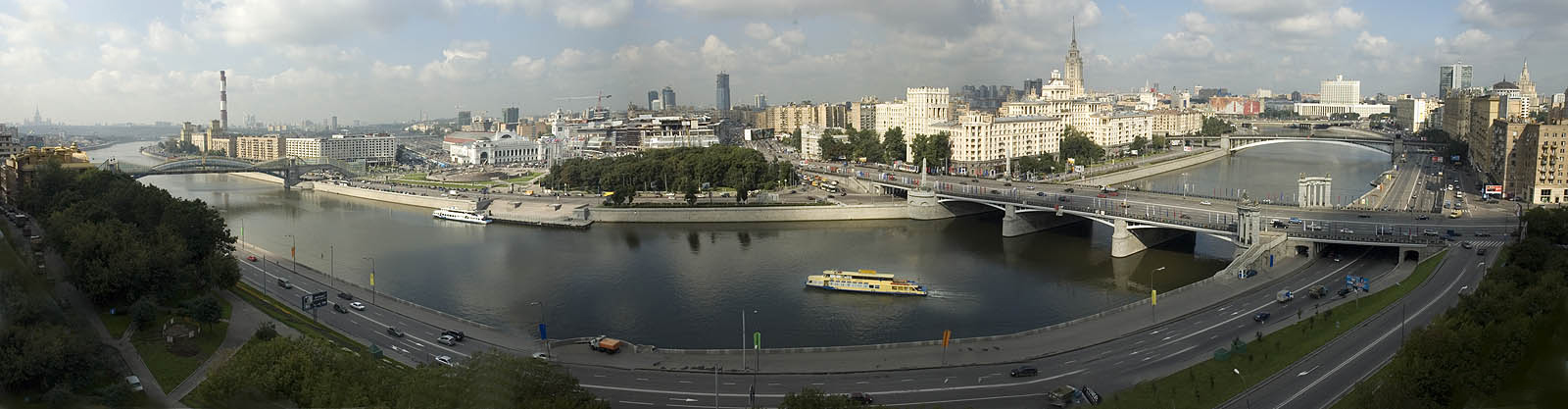
Panorama of Moscow, Borodinsky Bridge near right, Smolensky Metro Bridge far right

== History and specifications ==
The first stage of Moscow Metro opened in 1935 terminated at a shallow alignment Smolenskaya station. The second stage (opened in 1937) started with a 1.4 kilometer westward extension from Smolenskaya to Kiyevskaya, a station serving the Kiyevsky Rail Terminal, which required a river crossing. Tunnel crossing was impractical; an open contest for the bridge design was held in spring 1935. Yakovlev brothers won with a relatively modest, reserved prototype. Actual bridge was built without planned statues and portico.

The two-track bridge is supported with two 150 meter long, 11 meter high П-shaped steel arches. Arch box profile is 1.2 meter high at extreme points, 2.7 meter high in the middle. Above ground, track continues on concrete girders above embankments, so the bridge has a total of six spans: 19.225+20.5+19.225+150.0+19.225+19.225 meters. Two main pillars, finished in grey granite, are based on flat caissons, each measuring 40 by 17.5 meters (700 square meters).

Regular train service was closed in 1953 when a parallel, deep alignment Metro line was built. In 1958, service was resumed with the opening of Filyovskaya Line.

== See also ==
- List of bridges in Moscow
- Postcard of Metro train on the Bridge
