= Kiyevskaya (Filyovskaya line) =

Moscow Metro station

Kiyevskaya Киевская
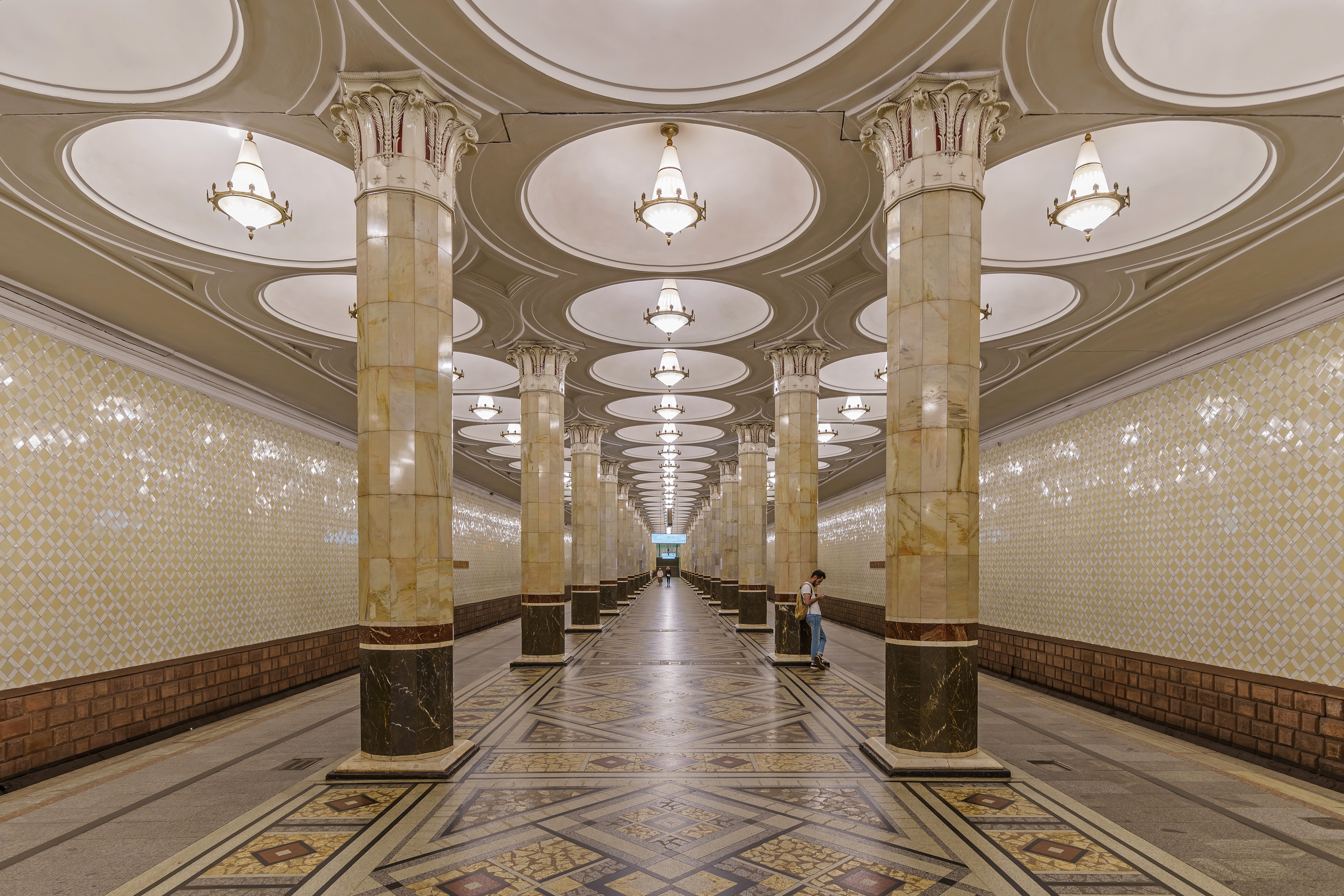

General information
- Location: Dorogomilovo District; Western Administrative Okrug; Moscow; Russia
- Coordinates: 55.7436°N 37.5655°E
- System: Moscow Metro station
- Owner: Moskovsky Metropoliten
- Line: Filyovskaya line
- Platforms: 1 island platform
- Tracks: 2

Construction
- Structure type: Shallow column station, triple-span
- Depth: 8.7 metres (29 ft)
- Platform levels: 1
- Parking: No

Other information
- Station code: 057

History
- Opened: 20 March 1937; 89 years ago
- Closed: 5 April 1953; 73 years ago to 7 November 1958; 67 years ago

Services
Preceding station	Moscow Metro	Following station
Vystavochnaya towards Mezhdunarodnaya	Filyovskaya line	Smolenskaya towards Aleksandrovsky Sad
Studencheskaya towards Kuntsevskaya	Filyovskaya line	Smolenskaya towards Aleksandrovsky Sad
Park Pobedy towards Pyatnitskoye Shosse	Arbatsko-Pokrovskaya line transfer at Kiyevskaya	Smolenskaya towards Shchyolkovskaya
Park Kultury anticlockwise / outer	Koltsevaya line transfer at Kiyevskaya	Krasnopresnenskaya clockwise / inner
Route map
Location
- Location within Central Moscow

Kiyevskaya (Russian: Киевская) is a station on the Filyovskaya line of the Moscow Metro in Moscow, Russia. It was originally part of the Arbatsko–Pokrovskaya line and initially opened in 1937 and closed in 1953 when the new Kiyevskaya station, intended to replace it, was completed. Due to a change of plans, however, it reopened after only five years as part of the new Filyovskaya line. The original architect was Dmitry Chechulin.

Kiyevskaya features tall, octagonal pillars topped with elaborate capitals. The pillars were originally faced with Armenian onyx, but this was replaced with yellowish Gazgan marble after ten years. The platform is intricately patterned with Ukrainian designs executed in red, white, and gray granite. The three rows of circular ceiling coffers originally housed incandescent light fixtures but these were abandoned in favor of the current three-bladed fluorescent lamps in the 1960s. Restoration work was done on the station from 2015 to 2016 to preserve the original 1930s design.

Between Kiyevskaya and Smolenskaya is the Smolensky Metro Bridge, which spans the Moskva River. The bridge was built in 1937 and was the first above-ground section of the Metro.

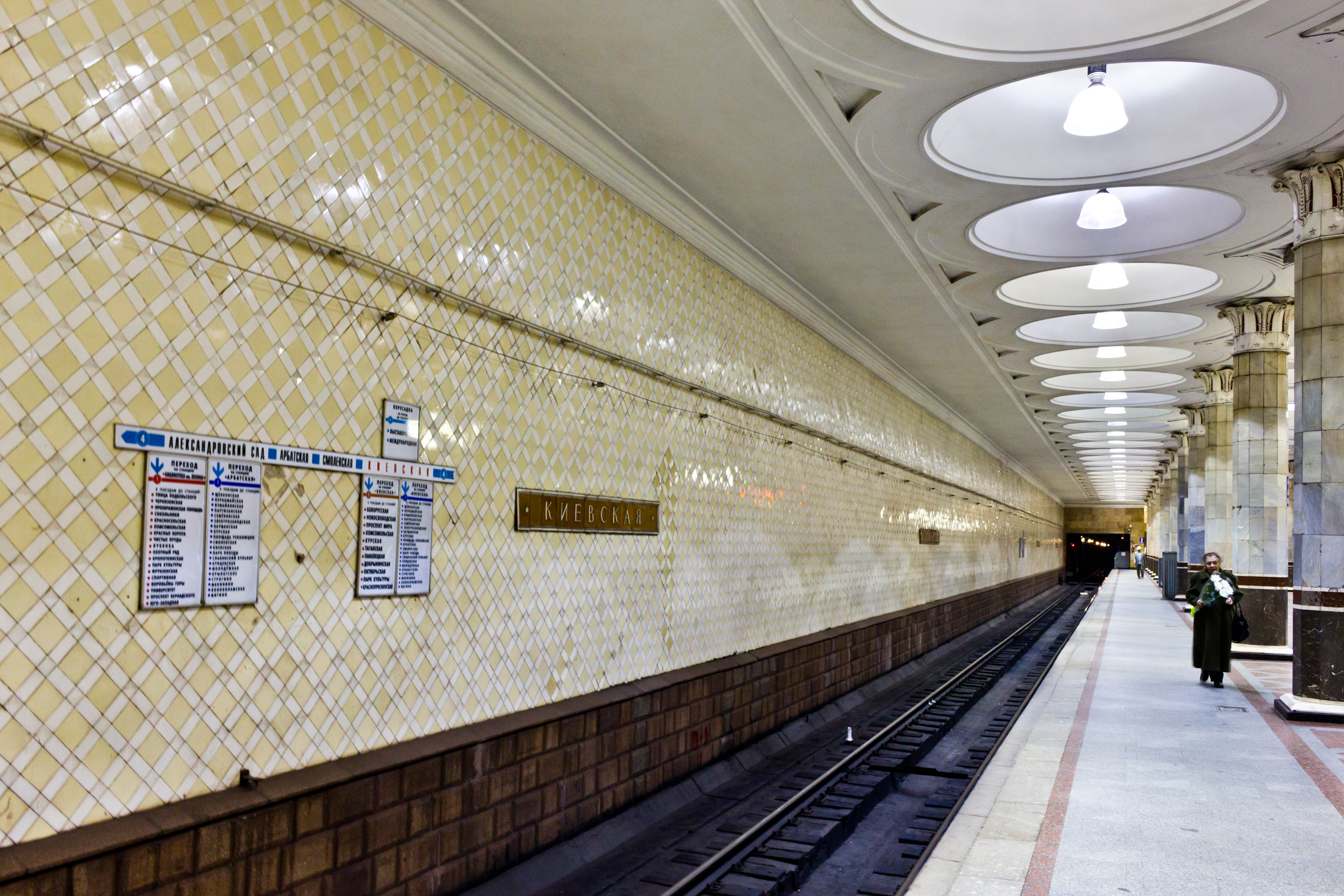
Station platform

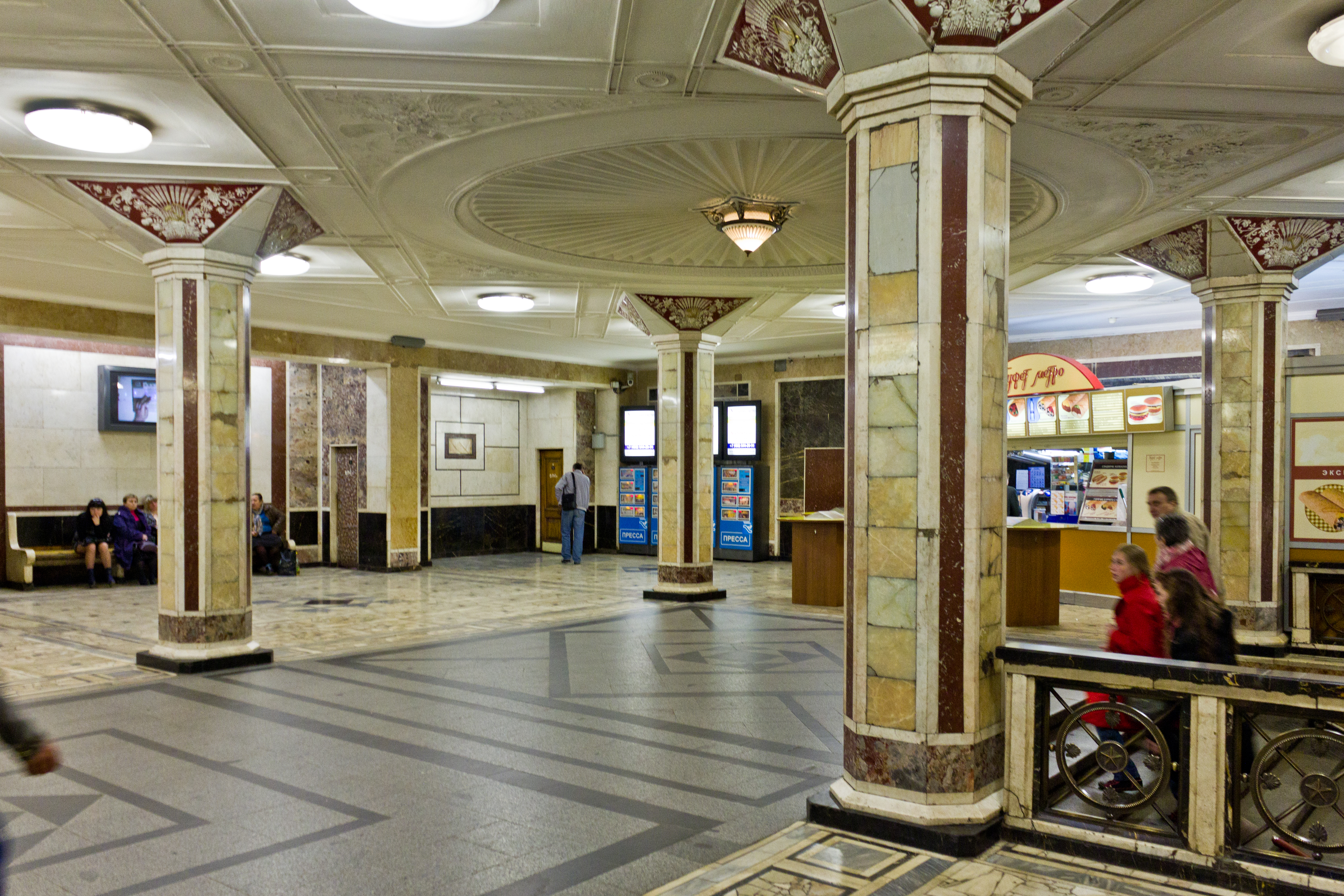
Upper level

== Transfers ==
From this station, passengers can transfer to Kiyevskaya on the Arbatsko–Pokrovskaya line and Kiyevskaya on the Koltsevaya line.
