= Kiyevsky (inhabited locality) =

Kiyevsky (Russian: Ки́евский; masculine), Kiyevskaya (Ки́евская; feminine), or Kiyevskoye (Ки́евское; neuter) is the name of several inhabited localities in Russia.

Urban localities

- Kiyevsky, Moscow, an urban-type settlement formerly in Naro-Fominsky District of Moscow Oblast; transferred to the jurisdiction of the federal city of Moscow on July 1, 2012.

Rural localities

- Kiyevsky, Kaluga Oblast, a settlement in Baryatinsky District of Kaluga Oblast
- Kiyevsky, Tomsk Oblast, a settlement in Kargasoksky District of Tomsk Oblast
- Kiyevsky, Volgograd Oblast, a khutor in Profsoyuzny Selsoviet of Danilovsky District of Volgograd Oblast
- Kiyevskoye, Kaliningrad Oblast, a settlement in Kovrovsky Rural Okrug of Zelenogradsky District of Kaliningrad Oblast
- Kiyevskoye, Krasnodar Krai, a selo in Kiyevsky Rural Okrug of Krymsky District of Krasnodar Krai
- Kiyevskoye, Republic of North Ossetia–Alania, a selo in Kiyevsky Rural Okrug of Mozdoksky District of the Republic of North Ossetia–Alania
- Kiyevskaya (rural locality), a village in Kumzersky Selsoviet of Kharovsky District of Vologda Oblast
