= Smolenskaya (Filyovskaya line) =

Moscow Metro station

Smolenskaya Смоленская
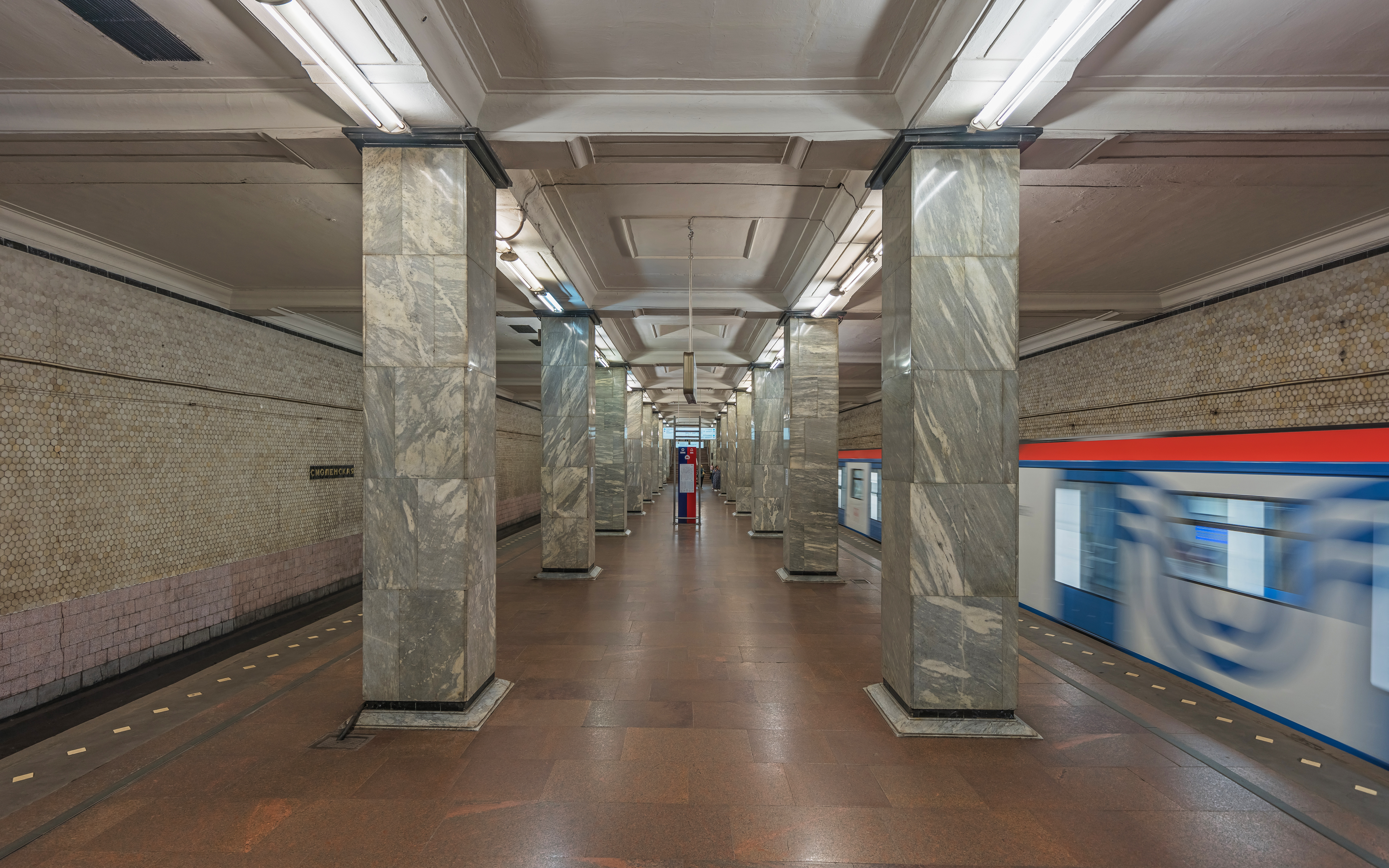

General information
- Location: Arbat District; Central Administrative Okrug; Moscow; Russia
- Coordinates: 55.7488°N 37.5825°E
- System: Moscow Metro station
- Owner: Moskovsky Metropoliten
- Line: Filyovskaya line
- Platforms: 1
- Tracks: 2

Construction
- Depth: 8 metres (26 ft)
- Platform levels: 1
- Parking: No

Other information
- Station code: 056

History
- Opened: 15 May 1935; 91 years ago
- Closed: 5 April 1953; 73 years ago to 7 July 1958; 68 years ago

Passengers
- 2002: 5,274,250

Services
Preceding station	Moscow Metro	Following station
Kiyevskaya towards Kuntsevskaya or Mezhdunarodnaya	Filyovskaya line	Arbatskaya towards Aleksandrovsky Sad
Route map
Location
- Location within Central Moscow

Smolenskaya (Russian: Смоленская) is a station on the Filyovskaya line of the Moscow Metro system in Moscow, Russia. It was opened in 1935 as part of the first Metro line. Designed by S.G. Andriyevsky and T.N. Makarychev, the station features grey marble pillars with flared bases and walls faced with white ceramic tile. Smolenskaya originally had two entrance vestibules, but one was demolished with the expansion of the Garden Ring avenue. There are still two sets of exit stairs on the platform, but one leads to a dead end where the passage to the old vestibule (very similar to the one still in use at Chistye Prudy) used to be. There is no direct transfer to the Smolenskaya metro station. Instead, there is a direct transfer to Plyushchika planned to the station from the Arbatsko-Pokrovskaya line.

== See also ==
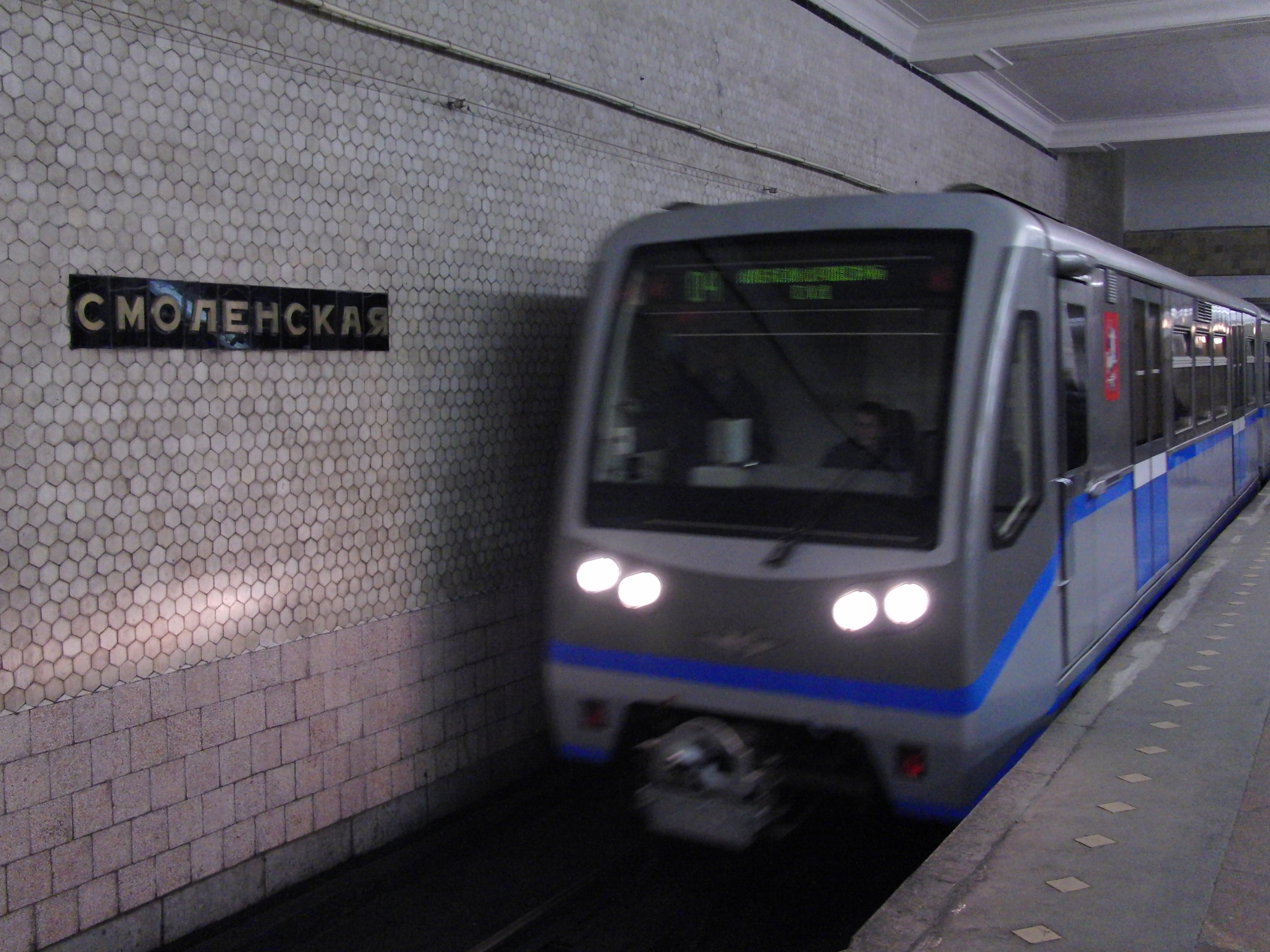
Platform

- Smolenskaya (Arbatsko–Pokrovskaya line) for another Moscow Metro station with the same name.
- Smolensky Metro Bridge over the Moskva River connecting the station to Kievskaya.
