= Smolenskaya (Arbatsko-Pokrovskaya line) =

Moscow Metro station

Smolenskaya Смоленская
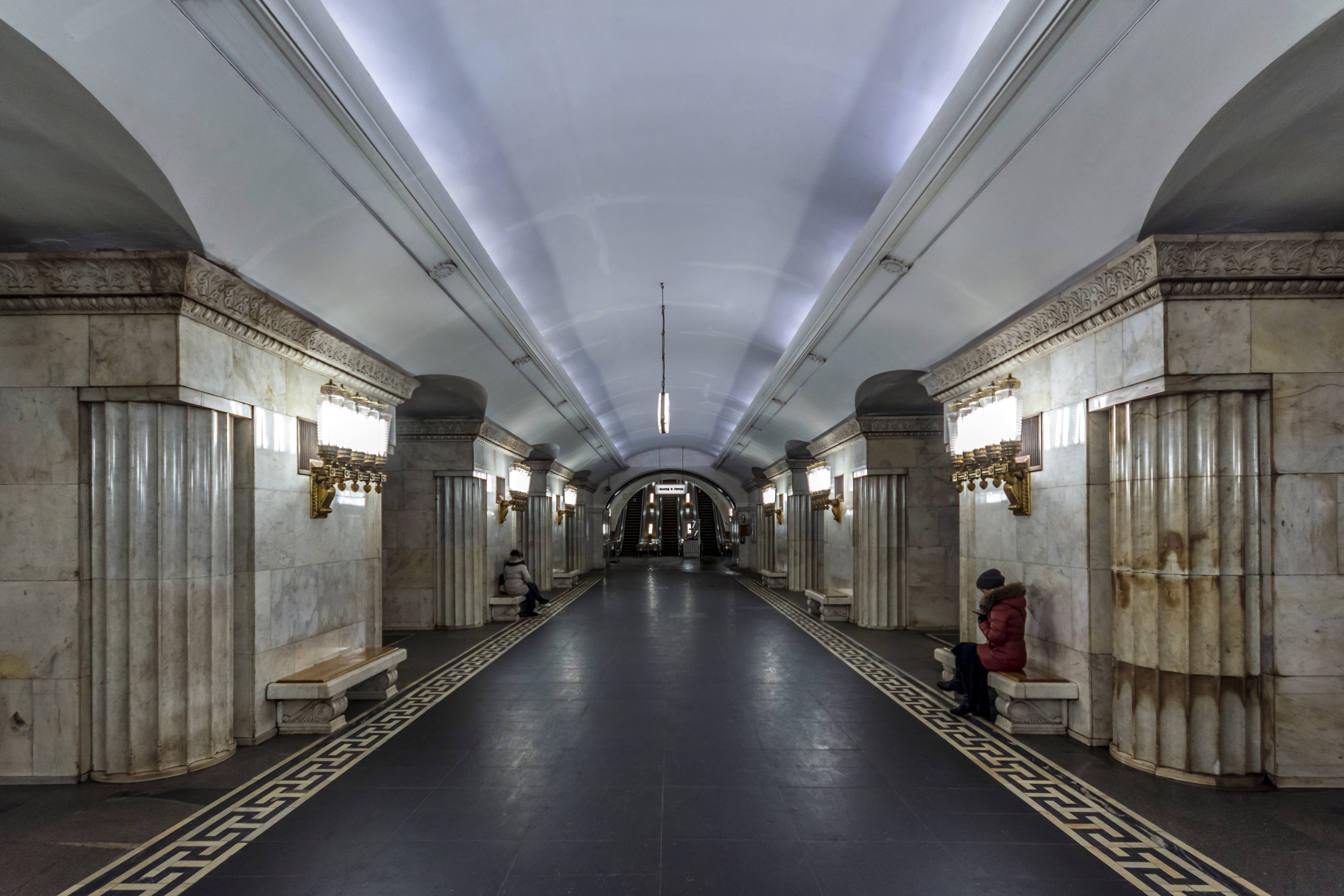

General information
- Location: Arbat District; Central Administrative Okrug; Moscow; Russia
- Coordinates: 55.7474°N 37.5823°E
- System: Moscow Metro station
- Owner: Moskovsky Metropoliten
- Line: Arbatsko-Pokrovskaya line
- Platforms: 1 island platform
- Tracks: 2

Construction
- Structure type: Pylon station
- Depth: 50 metres (160 ft)
- Platform levels: 1
- Parking: No

Other information
- Station code: 043

History
- Opened: 5 April 1953; 73 years ago 9 July 2021; 5 years ago (reopening)
- Closed: 22 February 2020; 6 years ago

Services
Preceding station	Moscow Metro	Following station
Kiyevskaya towards Pyatnitskoye Shosse	Arbatsko-Pokrovskaya line both	Arbatskaya towards Shchyolkovskaya
Route map
Location
- Location within Central Moscow

Smolenskaya (Russian: Смоленская) is a station on the Arbatsko–Pokrovskaya line of the Moscow Metro. It was built in 1953 to replace an older station of the same name, though that one was later reopened as part of the Filyovskaya line. The two stations are not connected.

Smolenskaya has square, white marble columns with fluted corners, decorative cornices, and ventilation grilles concealed behind ornamental sconces. At the end of the platform is a bas-relief by G.I. Motovilov entitled "The Defenders of Russia," which depicts soldiers of the Red Army in battle. The architects of the station were Igor Rozhin and G. P. Yakovlev. At 50 m below the surface, Smolenskaya was the deepest station on the line until Park Pobedy opened in 2003.

From 22 February 2020 to 9 July 2021, the station was closed for reconstruction due to the replacement of escalators.

There is no direct transfer to Smolenskaya planned, but there is an out-of-system transfer to it. A direct transfer to Plyushchika on the Kalininsko-Solntsevskaya line is planned.

== Gallery ==
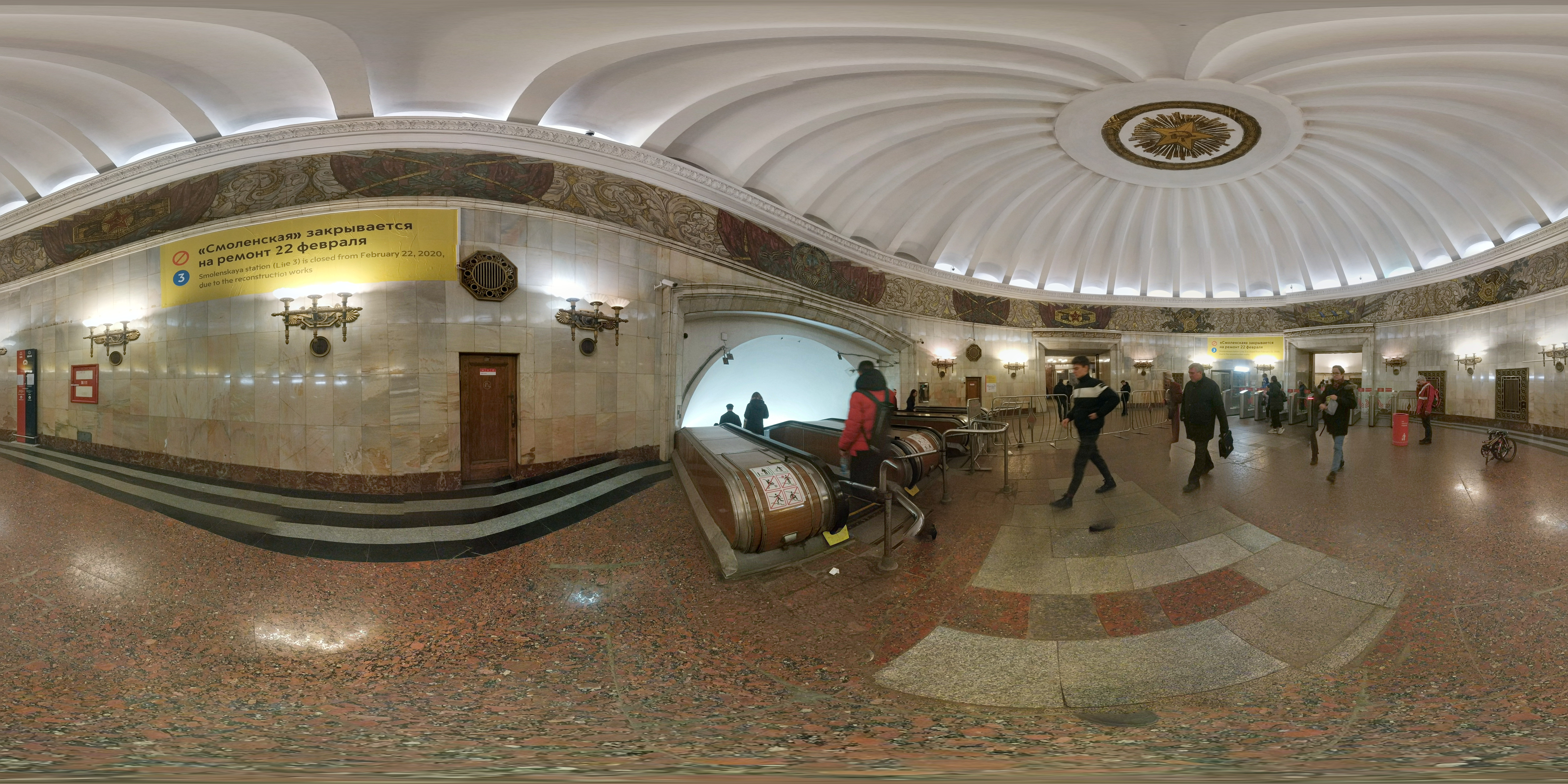
Interior of vestibule (view as a 360° interactive panorama)

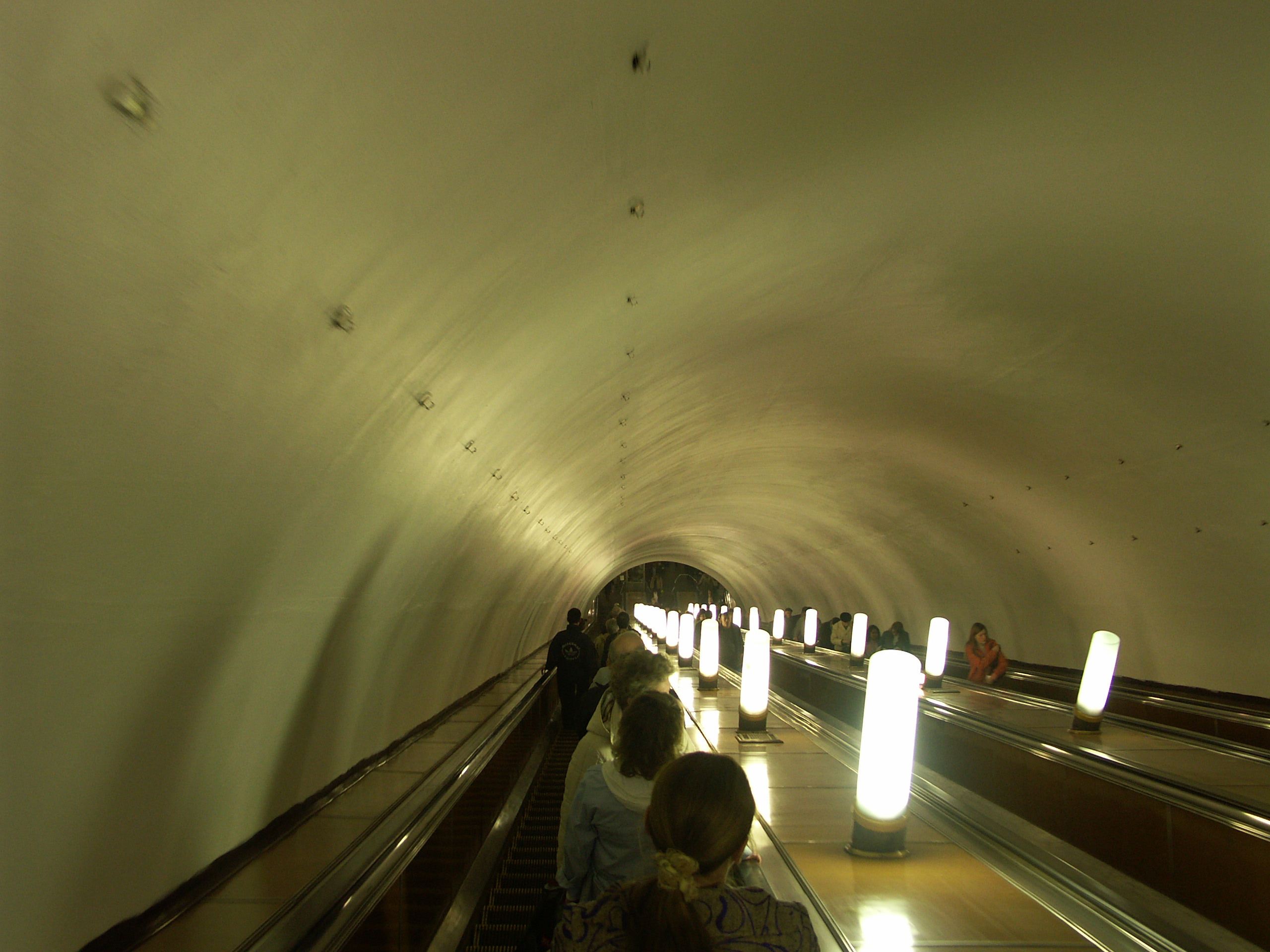
Station escalators

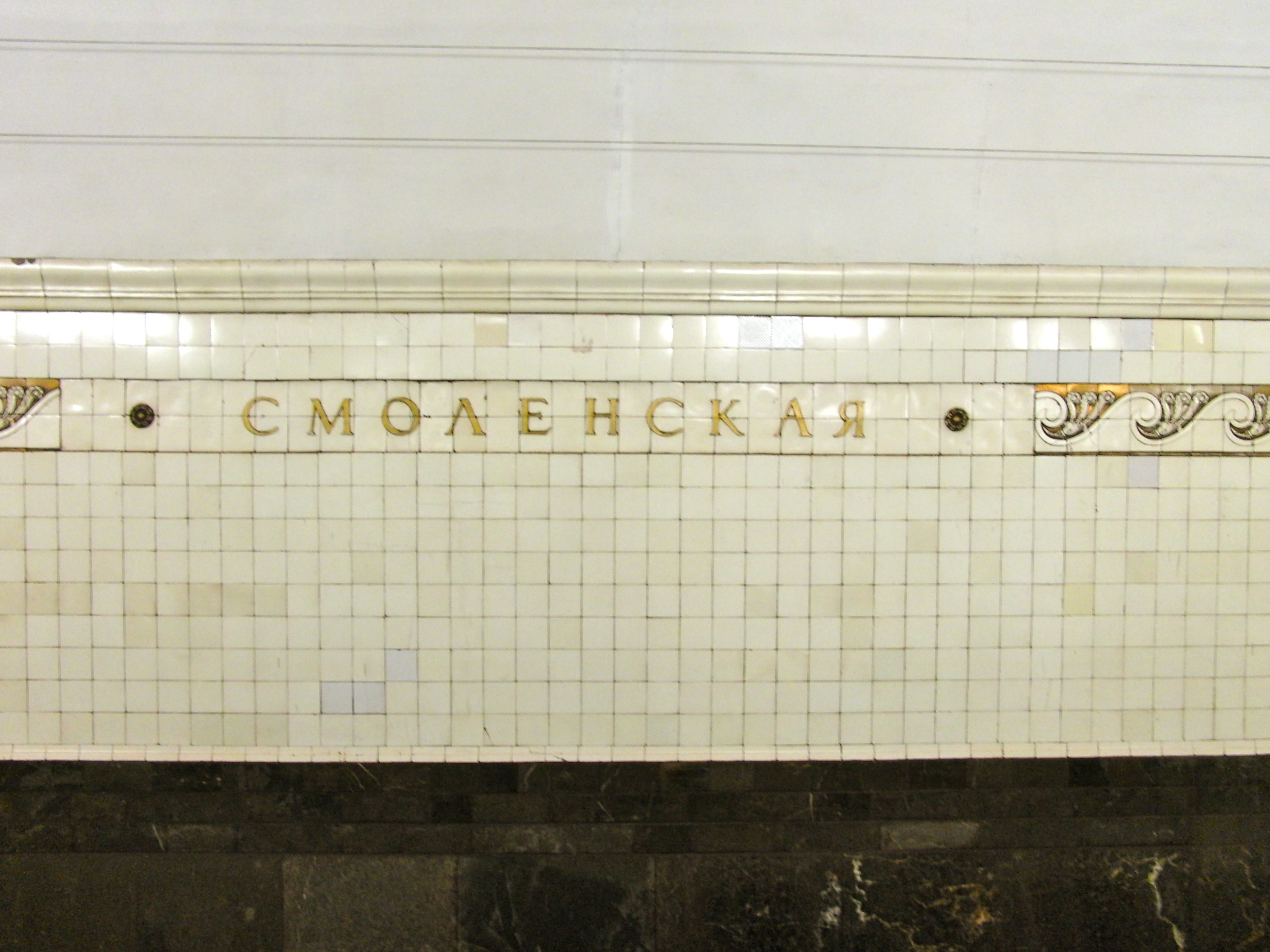
Station name in Russian on platform

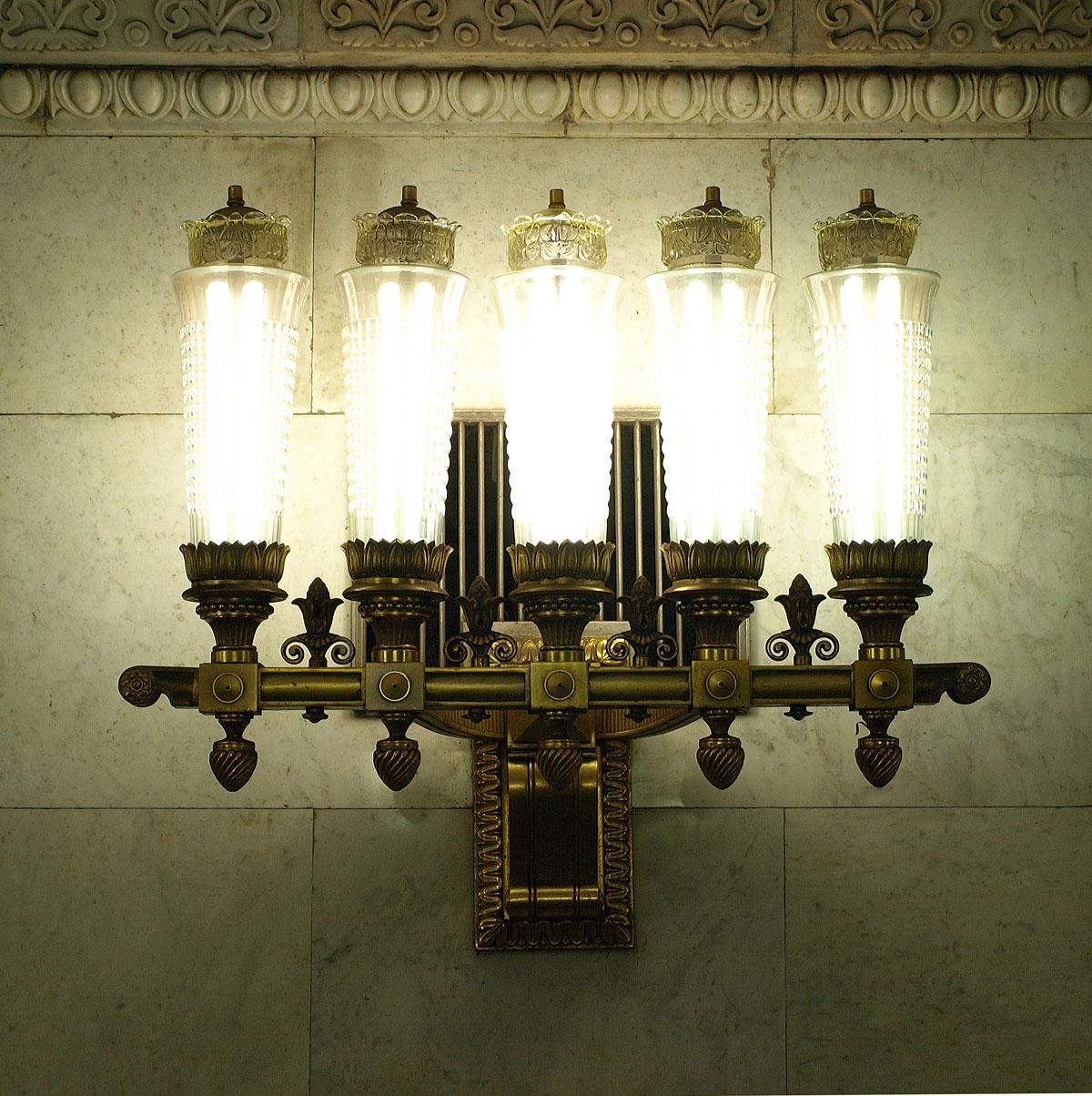
Station lighting

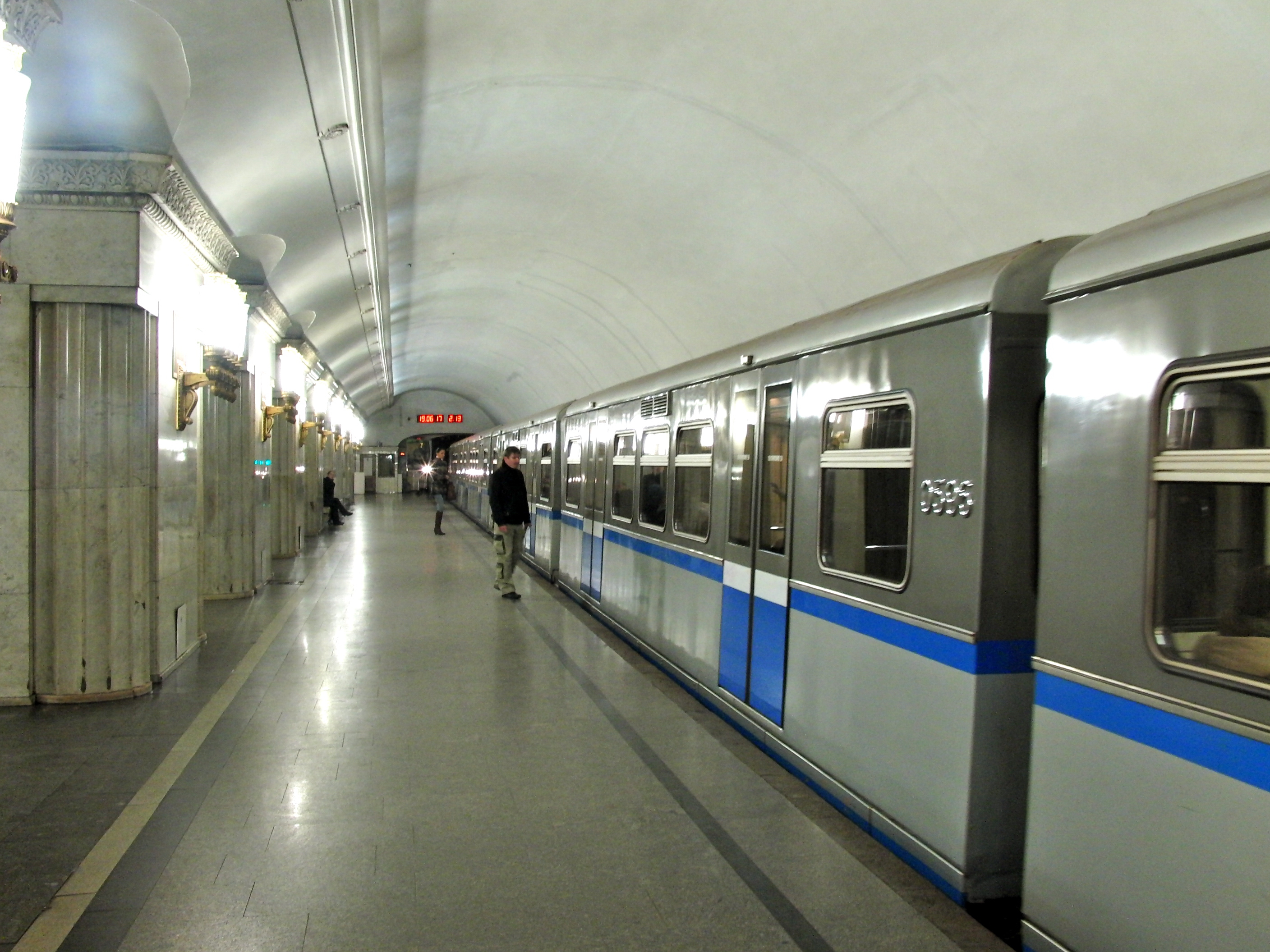
Station platform
