= Kiyevsky, Volgograd Oblast =

Kiyevsky Киевский
- Khutor
- Location within Volgograd Oblast Location within Russia
- Coordinates: 50°31′N 43°43′E
- Country: Russia
- Region: Volgograd Oblast
- District: Danilovsky District
- Time zone: UTC+4:00

Kiyevsky (Russian: Киевский) is a rural locality (a khutor) in Profsoyuzninskoye Rural Settlement, Danilovsky District, Volgograd Oblast, Russia. The population was 2 as of 2010. There is 1 street.

== Geography ==
The village is located in steppe, on the north-west bank of the Bobrovoye Lake, 9.4 km from Profsoyuznik, 40 km from Danilovka and 260 km from Volgograd.
