= Delovoy Tsentr (Filyovskaya line) =

Moscow Metro station

Delovoy Tsentr Деловой центр
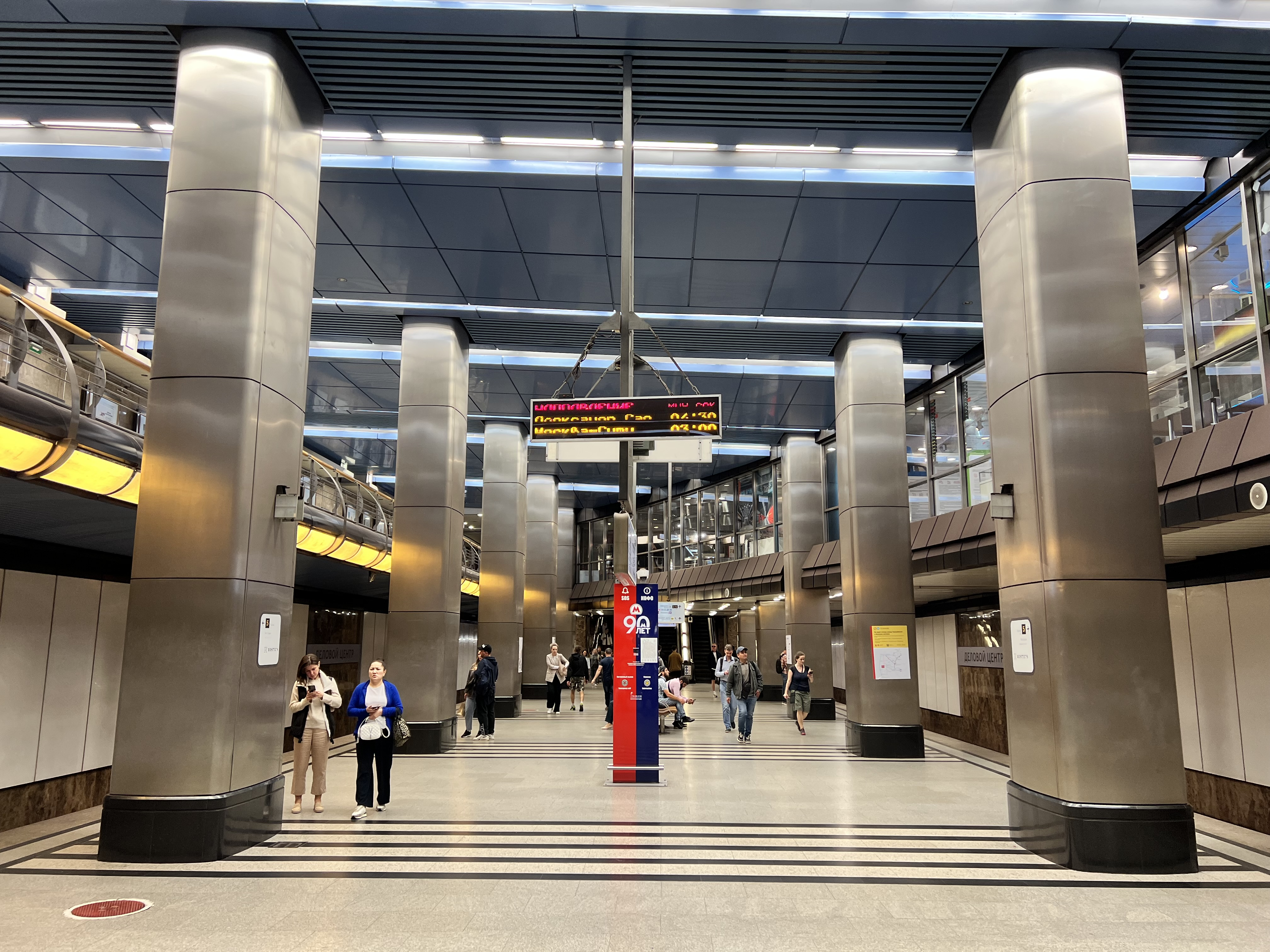

General information
- Location: Presnensky District; Central Administrative Okrug; Moscow; Russia
- Coordinates: 55.7502°N 37.5408°E
- System: Moscow Metro station
- Owner: Moskovsky Metropoliten
- Line: Filyovskaya Line
- Platforms: 1
- Tracks: 2

Construction
- Depth: 25 metres (82 ft)
- Platform levels: 1
- Parking: paid, every day (service exit on Bagration bridge under Evolution tower, or public exit via Afi mall)

Other information
- Station code: 188

History
- Opened: 10 September 2005; 20 years ago
- Former names: Delovoy Tsentr (2005–2008); Vystavochnaya (2008–2024)

Services
Preceding station	Moscow Metro	Following station
Mezhdunarodnaya Terminus	Filyovskaya line (business centre branch)	Kiyevskaya towards Aleksandrovsky Sad
Terminus	Rublyovo-Arkhangelskaya line transfer at Delovoy Tsentr	Shelepikha towards Delovoy Tsentr
Park Pobedy towards Aeroport Vnukovo	Kalininsko-Solntsevskaya line (Solntsevsky radius) transfer at Delovoy Tsentr	Terminus
Route map
Location
- Location within Moscow Metro

Delovoy Tsentr (Russian: Деловой центр, "Business Centre") is a station on the Filyovskaya Line of the Moscow Metro system in Moscow, Russia. It was opened on 10 September 2005, and was named Vystavochnaya (Russian: Выставочная) from June 3, 2008, to March 31, 2024.

The high-tech design, which was the work of architects Aleksandr Vigdorov, Leonid Borzenkov, and Olga Farstova, is a radical departure from the design of previous Metro stations.

The station is built on two levels, with the platform on the lower level. The upper level consists of two walkways which span the length of the platform. One walkway, the larger one, is enclosed in glass and sweeps from one side of the station to the other and back in a large arc. The other walkway is open and straight, running directly above the inbound track. The D-shaped area between the two walkways extends to the full height of the station. The two rows of pillars span both levels and are clad in stainless steel. The walls are faced with white plastic panels and brown marble, and Alucobond was used for the ceiling.

The entrance to the station is built into the lower level of Moscow International Business Center (Moscow-City), near the north bank of the Moskva River, also serving access to Moscow Expocentre.

In the upper level of the station before you go through the turn styles can be found the public museum to the Moscow Metro. It is free to enter and has photos and displays of memorabilia and artwork spanning the ages. There is also a train cab simulator.

== Transfer ==
Passengers at Vystavochnaya are able to transfer to Delovoy Tsentr of the Kalininsko–Solntsevskaya line. A third station, that allow transfers to the Bolshaya Koltsevaya line.

== Gallery ==
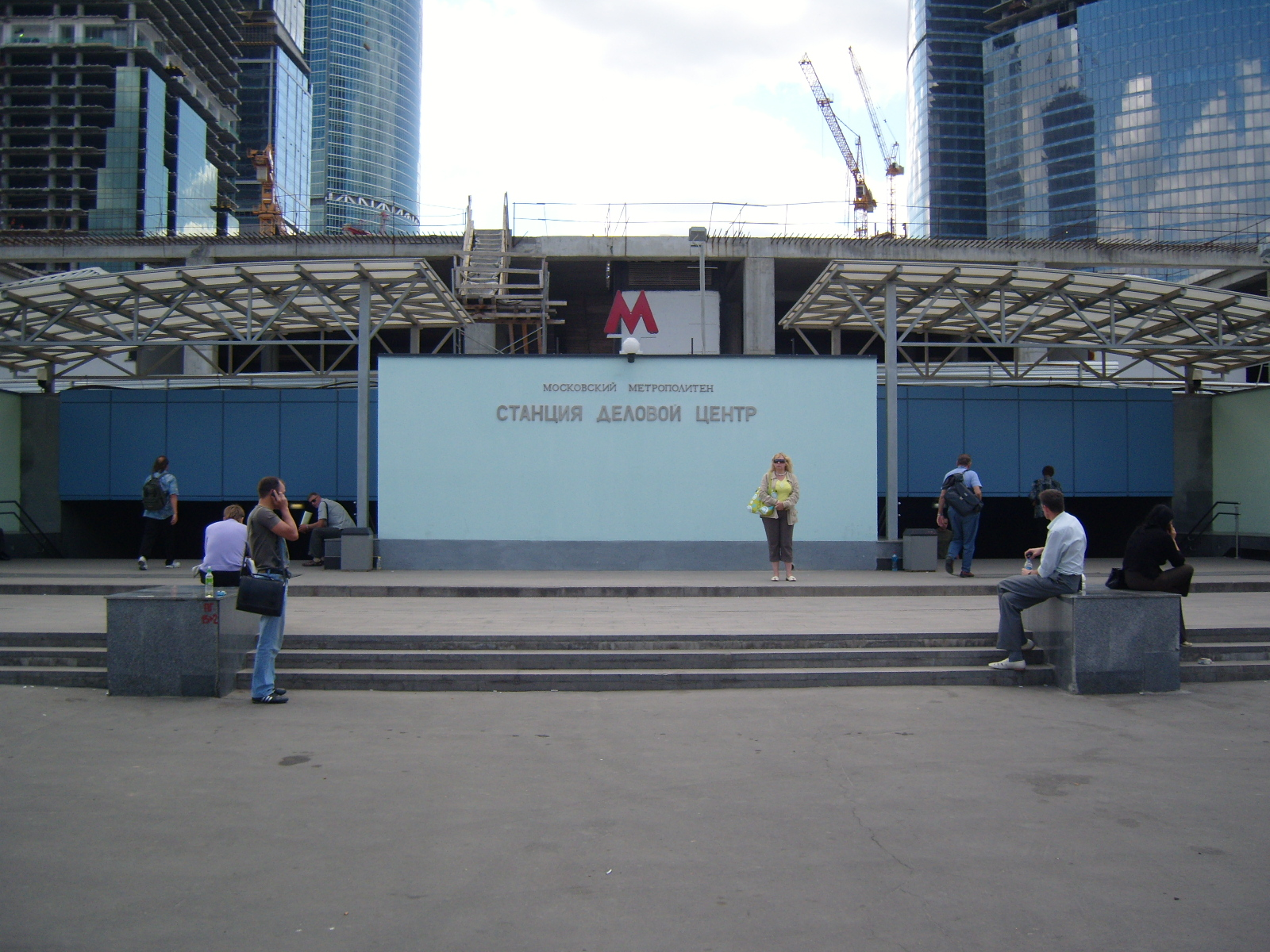
Surface hall of the station when it was under construction

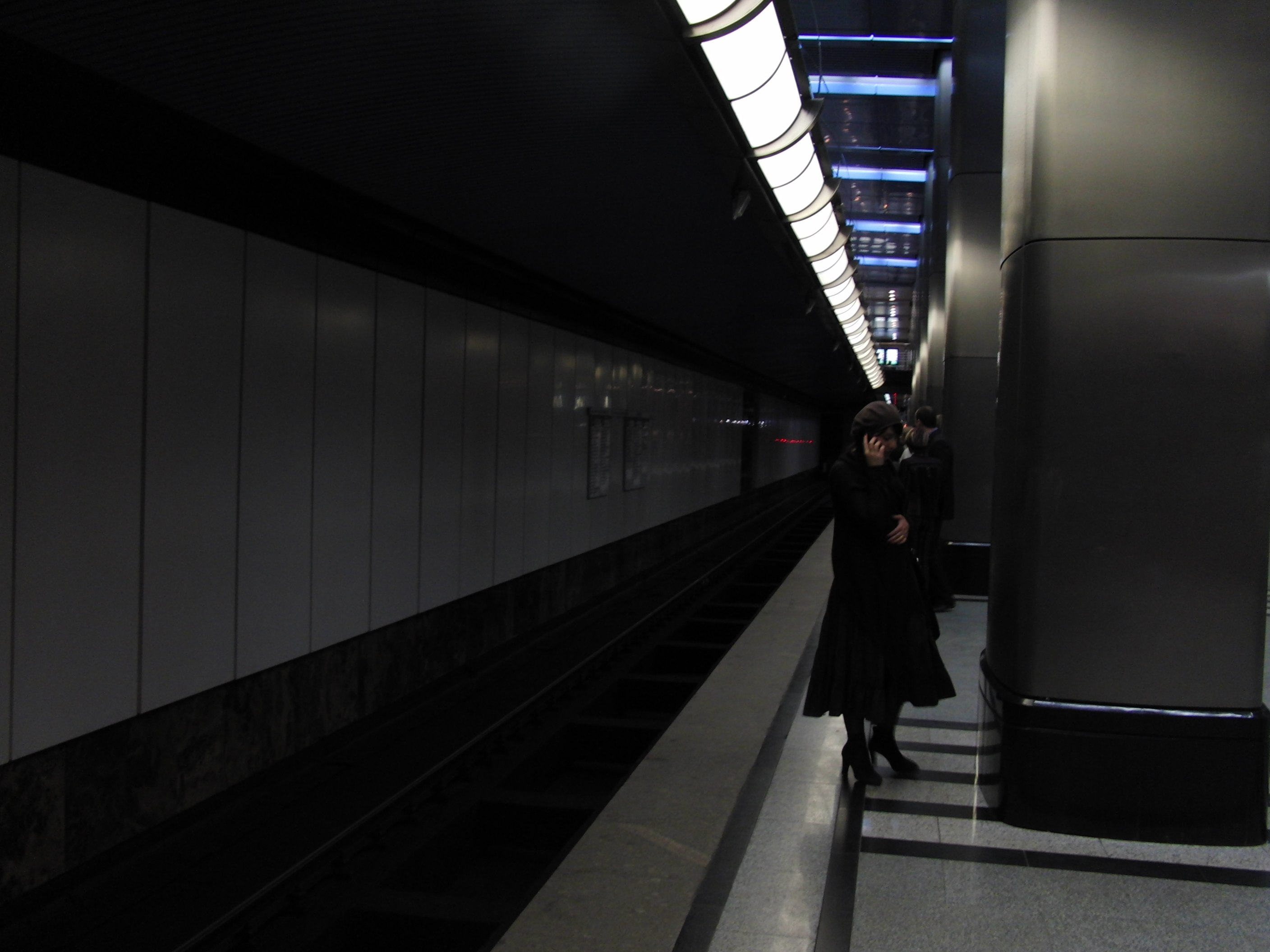
Platform

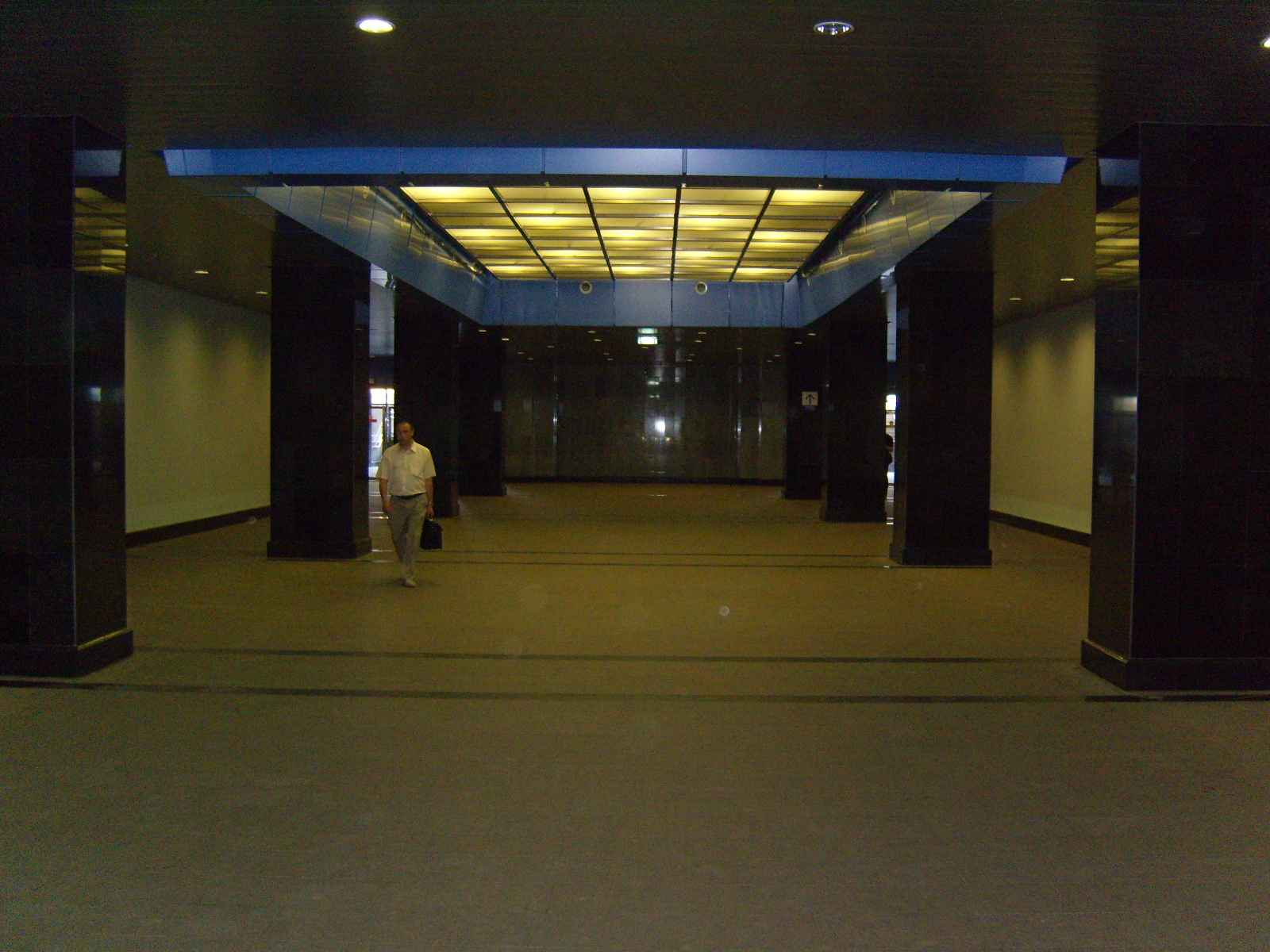
Surface hall inside

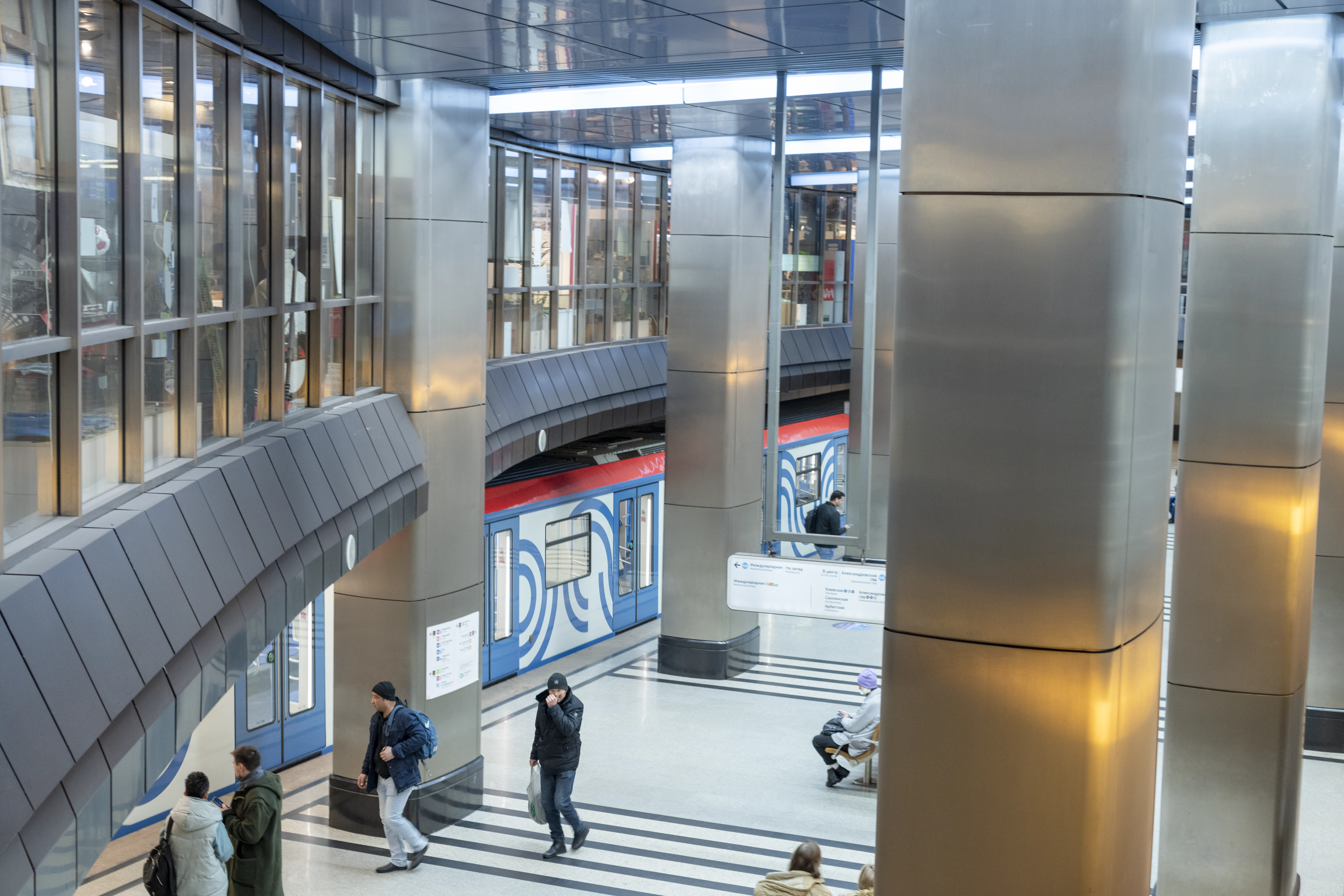
Balcony on the station

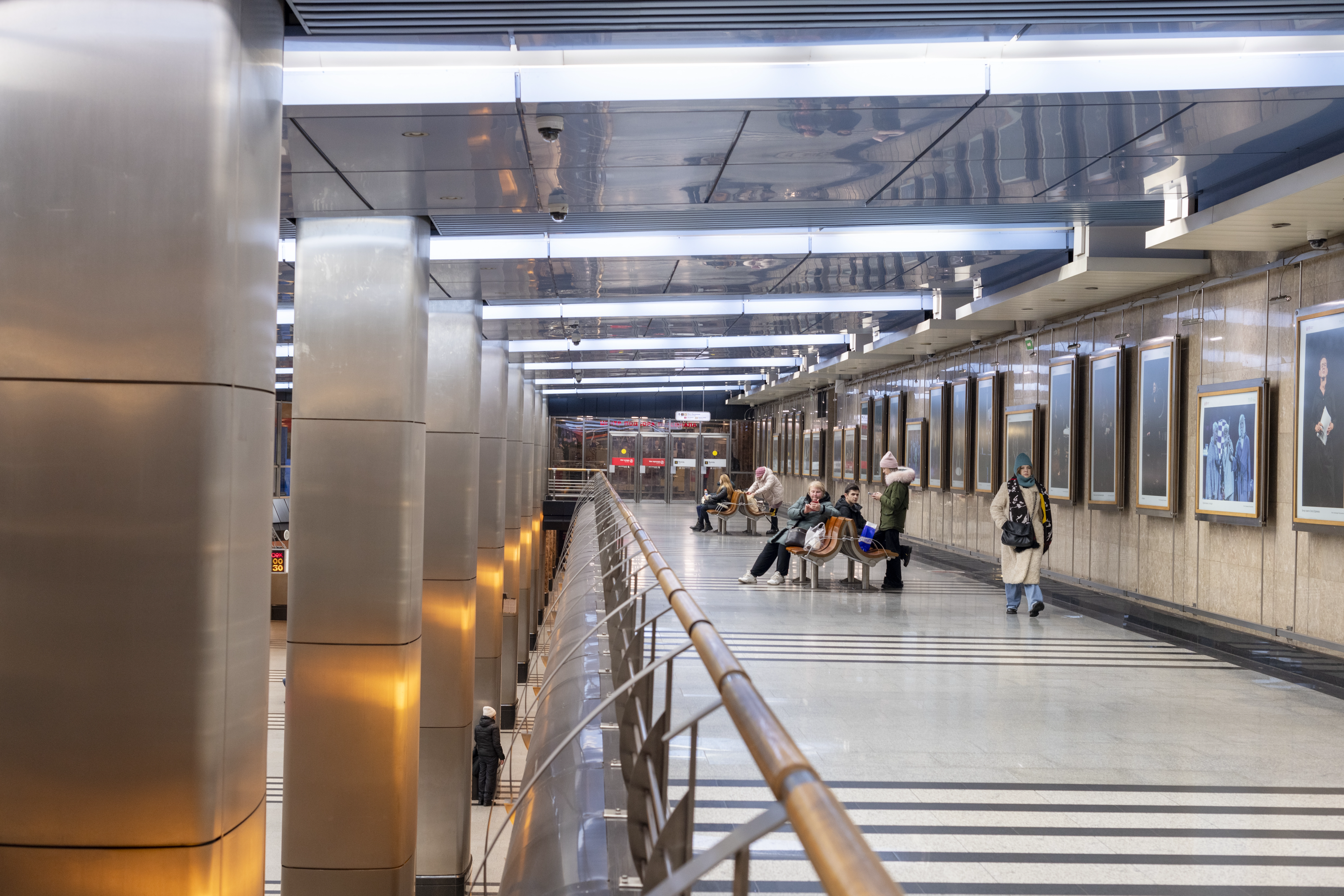
Photo exhibition on balcony
