= Moskva-City (Filyovskaya line) =

Moscow Metro station

Moskva-City Москва-Сити
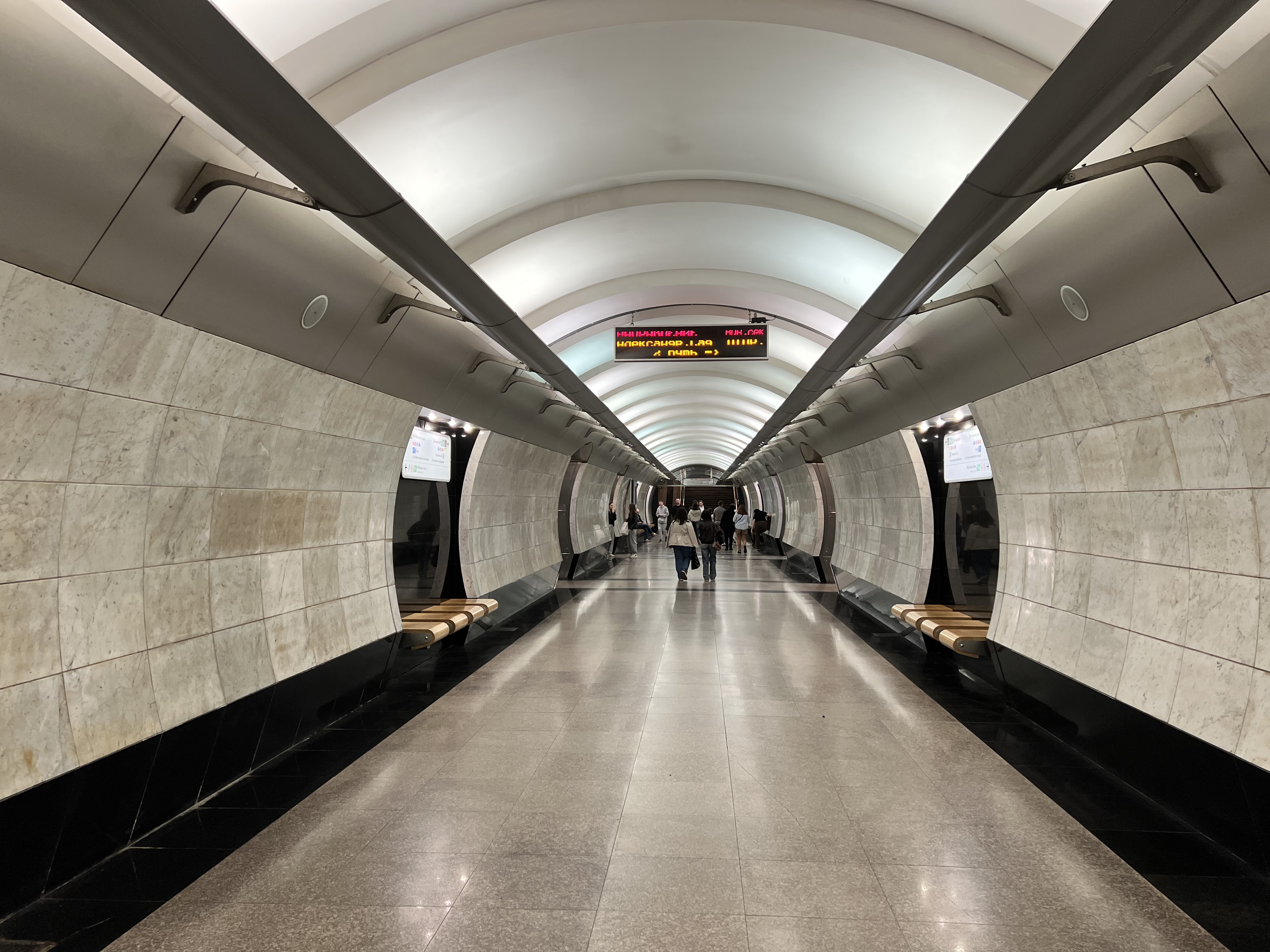

General information
- Location: Presnensky District; Central Administrative Okrug; Moscow; Russia
- Coordinates: 55.7483°N 37.5339°E
- System: Moscow Metro station
- Owner: Moskovsky Metropoliten
- Line: Filyovskaya Line
- Platforms: 1 island platform
- Tracks: 2

Construction
- Depth: 25 metres (82 ft)
- Platform levels: 1
- Parking: No

Other information
- Station code: 189

History
- Opened: 30 August 2006; 19 years ago
- Former names: Mezhdunarodnaya (2006–2024)

Services
Preceding station	Moscow Metro	Following station
Terminus	Filyovskaya line (business centre branch)	Delovoy Tsentr towards Aleksandrovsky Sad
Route map
Location
- Location within Moscow Metro

Moskva-City (Russian: Москва-Сити; "Moscow-City") is the northern terminus of one of the 2 branches of the Filyovskaya Line of the Moscow Metro system in Moscow, Russia. The station was built as part of the second stage and completed the branch of the Filyovskaya Line into the Moscow International Business Center (Moscow-City). It opened on 30 August 2006.

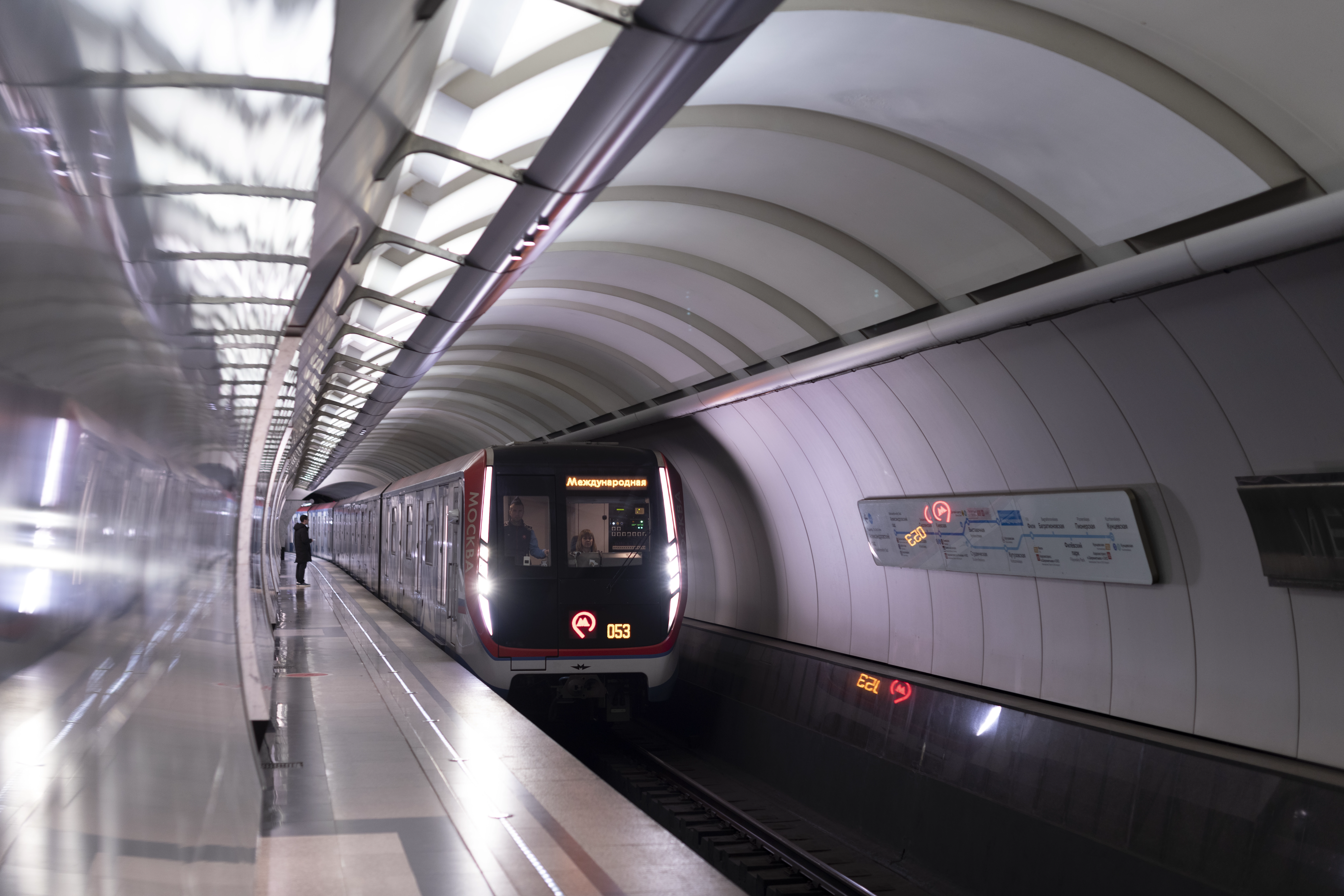
Train at narrow platform hall

The station, designed by architects A. Orlov and A. Nekrasov, features a deep-level column tri-vault design. However, unlike the standard Moscow Metro station sizes, the platform length is shortened from 162 to 118 metres, while the sizes of both the central and platform vaults have also been reduced from the standard 9 to 7.5 metres. As a result, the station has sizes similar to those on the London Underground stations. Also, Moskva-City is the only deep-level station that features a curved platform.

Track diagram

Decoratively the station has a modern "high-tech" design that blends with the skyscraper landscape of the Moscow-City. The design consists of white marble and plastic panels, a dark granite floor, and metallic interpylon slabs. The western vestibule of the station is located under Moscow's internal motorway, the Third Ring. The lobby contains modernized turnstiles.

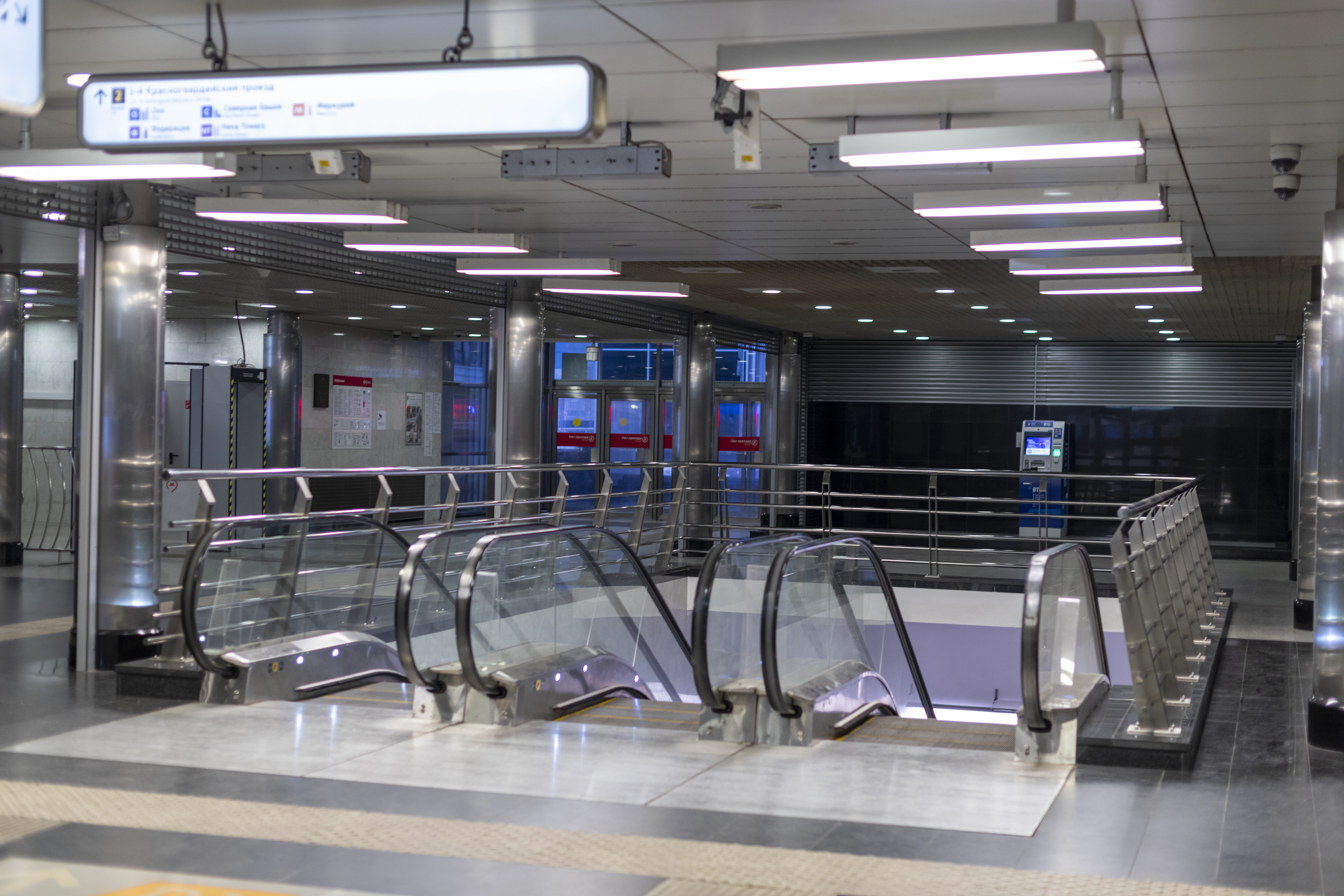
Escalators

The eastern vestibule with escalator was built later, and opened on 30 December 2017.
