= Filyovskaya line =

Moscow Metro line

Overview
- Owner: Moskovsky Metropoliten
- Locale: Moscow
- Termini: Aleksandrovsky Sad (center); Kuntsevskaya (west); Moskva-City (west)
- Stations: 13

Service
- Type: Rapid transit
- System: Moscow Metro
- Operator: Moskovsky Metropoliten
- Rolling stock: 81-765.2/766.2/767.2
- Daily ridership: 320,600

History
- Opened: 15 May 1935 (as branch of); 7 November 1958 (as fully separate)

Technical
- Line length: 14.9 km (9.3 mi)
- Character: At-grade, underground
- Track gauge: 1,520 mm (4 ft 11 27/32 in)
- Electrification: Third rail

The Filyovskaya line (Russian: Филёвская ли́ния, IPA: [fɪˈlʲɵfskəjə ˈlʲinʲɪjə]), (Line 4; Sky Line), formerly the Arbatsko-Filyovskaya line (Russian: Арбатско-Филёвская) is a line of the Moscow Metro system in Moscow, Russia. Chronologically the sixth line to open, it connects the major western districts of Dorogomilovo and Fili along with the Moscow-City with the city centre. At present it has 13 stations and is 14.9 kilometres (9.3 mi) long.

== History ==
The history of the Filyovskaya line is one of the most complicated in the Moscow Metro system, due to the eastern radius falling victim to changing policies. Originally the earliest stations are the oldest, dating to 1935 and 1937 when they opened as part of the First stage and operated as a branch from what later became the Sokolnicheskaya line. In 1938 the branch service was liquidated, and the Arbatsko-Pokrovskaya line was created by trains now terminating at Kurskaya. However, during the Second World War, the station Arbatskaya suffered damage when a German bomb pierced its ceiling, as all of the 1930s stations were built subsurface.

The threat of the Cold War becoming hot meant that these early stations were not suited to double as bomb shelters, and instead, a deep parallel section was built. This would have meant the end of the Filyovskaya line, had Nikita Khrushchev as part of his visit to New York City not been inspired by seeing elevated and surface lines. Upon his return, and coinciding with his pursuit to save costs on architecture and construction, he cancelled the planned deep-level extension to Fili and instead built a surface line that would see the old stations reopened. In 1958 the Arbatsko–Filyovskaya line was inaugurated, becoming the sixth to open (the term Arbatsko- was dropped later). The line continued to extend westwards reaching Fili in 1959, along with its separate depot, the Fili Park in 1961 and ultimately the housing complex of Kuntsevo in 1965. A further extension was built to a newer development in Krylatskoye in 1989.

All of the stations, save Molodyozhnaya and Krylatskoye, were at ground level, the original late 1950s trio was built to an identical side-platform configuration, while the remaining four with a standardised island platform. Despite the success in saving costs, the Russian climate, particularly the winter, the sharp bends, and the small station size made the line one of the most unpopular with passengers.

By the 21st century, however, Filyovskaya line's fate would change radically. First the rising Moscow City business centre required a metro line, and a two-station branch was opened from Kievskaya in 2005 to Delovoy Tsentr and again in 2006 to Mezhdunarodnaya. In December 2020 the route from Alexandrovsky Sad, line's eastern terminus, to Mezhdunarodnaya was given its own designation on metro maps.

In early 2008, with the realization of the Strogino–Mitino extension the Filyovskaya line's underground end was taken up by the same Arbatsko-Pokrovskaya line, and its terminus was a redesigned platform at Kuntsevskaya.

=== Timeline ===
Segment	Date opened	Length
Aleksandrovsky Sad – Smolenskaya	15 May 1935	1.7 km
Smolenskaya – Kiyevskaya	20 March 1937	1.4 km
Aleksandrovsky Sad – Ploshchad Revolyutsii	13 March 1938	*
Kiyevskaya – Kutuzovskaya	7 November 1958	2.3 km
Kutuzovskaya – Fili	7 November 1959	1.7 km
Fili – Pionerskaya	13 October 1961	3.5 km
Pionerskaya – Molodyozhnaya	5 July 1965	3.8 km***
Kuntsevskaya	31 August 1965	N/A
Molodyozhnaya – Krylatskoye	31 December 1989	1.9 km
Kiyevskaya – Delovoy Tsentr	10 September 2005	2.2 km**
Delovoy Tsentr – Moskva-City	30 August 2006	0.5 km
Kuntsevskaya – Krylatskoye detached	2 January 2008	−4.3 km***
Total		14.7 km

* Service branch of 0.9 km was used to connect Aleksandrovsky Sad and Ploshchad Revolyutsii.

** Segment exists as branch on route Aleksandrovskiy Sad – Kiyevskaya – Mezhdunarodnaya.

*** On 2 January 2008 the Filyovskaya line was shortened to its terminus at Kuntsevskaya, whilst the stations Molodyozhnaya and Krylatskoye were passed on to the Arbatsko-Pokrovskaya line

== Routes ==
As of 2024, the Filyovskaya line is the only line of the Moscow Metro with two routes.

Icon	Section of line	Number of stations
#4 Filyovskaya line	from Aleksandrovsky Sad to Kuntsevskaya	11
#4A Filyovskaya line	from Aleksandrovsky Sad to Moskva-City	5

== Name changes ==
Station	Previous name(s)	Years
Aleksandrovsky Sad	Komintern	1935–1937
Aleksandrovsky Sad	Ulitsa Kominterna	1937–1946
Aleksandrovsky Sad	Kalininskaya	1946–1990
Moskva-City	Mezhduranodnaya	2006–2024
Delovoy Tsentr	Delovoy Tsentr	2005–2008
Delovoy Tsentr	Vystavochnaya	2008–2024

== Transfers ==
Transfer to	At
Sokolnicheskaya line	Aleksandrovsky Sad
Arbatsko-Pokrovskaya line	Kiyevskaya
Arbatsko-Pokrovskaya line	Aleksandrovsky Sad
Arbatsko-Pokrovskaya line	Kuntsevskaya
Koltsevaya line	Kiyevskaya
Solntsevskaya line	Vystavochnaya
Serpukhovsko-Timiryazevskaya line	Aleksandrovsky Sad (via or)

== Rolling stock ==
The line is served by the Fili (№ 9) depot and currently the whole fleet is undergoing replacement. The oldest E type trains in Moscow were retired in 2009. Six carriage fleet of 24 trains (a mix of Ezh, Ezh1, Em-508 and Em-509) will was passed on to other depots and replaced by the new 81–740.1/741.1 "Rusich" (also known as "Skif") which are more suited for the outdoor climate that the line has. Also, there are five old 81-717/714 trains from Koltsevaya and Kalininskaya lines. They are mostly running on the "Aleksandrovsky sad" – "Mezhdunarodnaya" line, but some trains are running on the main line to "Kuntsevskaya".

In the summer of 2018, the operation of new 81-765.2/766.2/767.2 "Moskva" trains began. By December 2018 the line was solely operating 81–765.2/766.2/767.2s. The 81-765/766/767s are also suited for the outdoor climates the line has but have gangways between every carriage and are more advanced.

Subway car types used on the line over the years:

Type	Dates
Series A, B	1935 - 1953
Series V	1958 - 1962
Series D	1961 - 1992
Series E	1986 - 2007
Series Ezh, Em-508 and Em-509	1986 - 2009
Series 81-740A/741A	2005 - 2006
Series 81-740.1/741.1	2005 - 2019
Series 81-717/714	2011 - 2018
Series 81-765.2/766.2/767.2	2018–present

== Recent developments and future plans ==
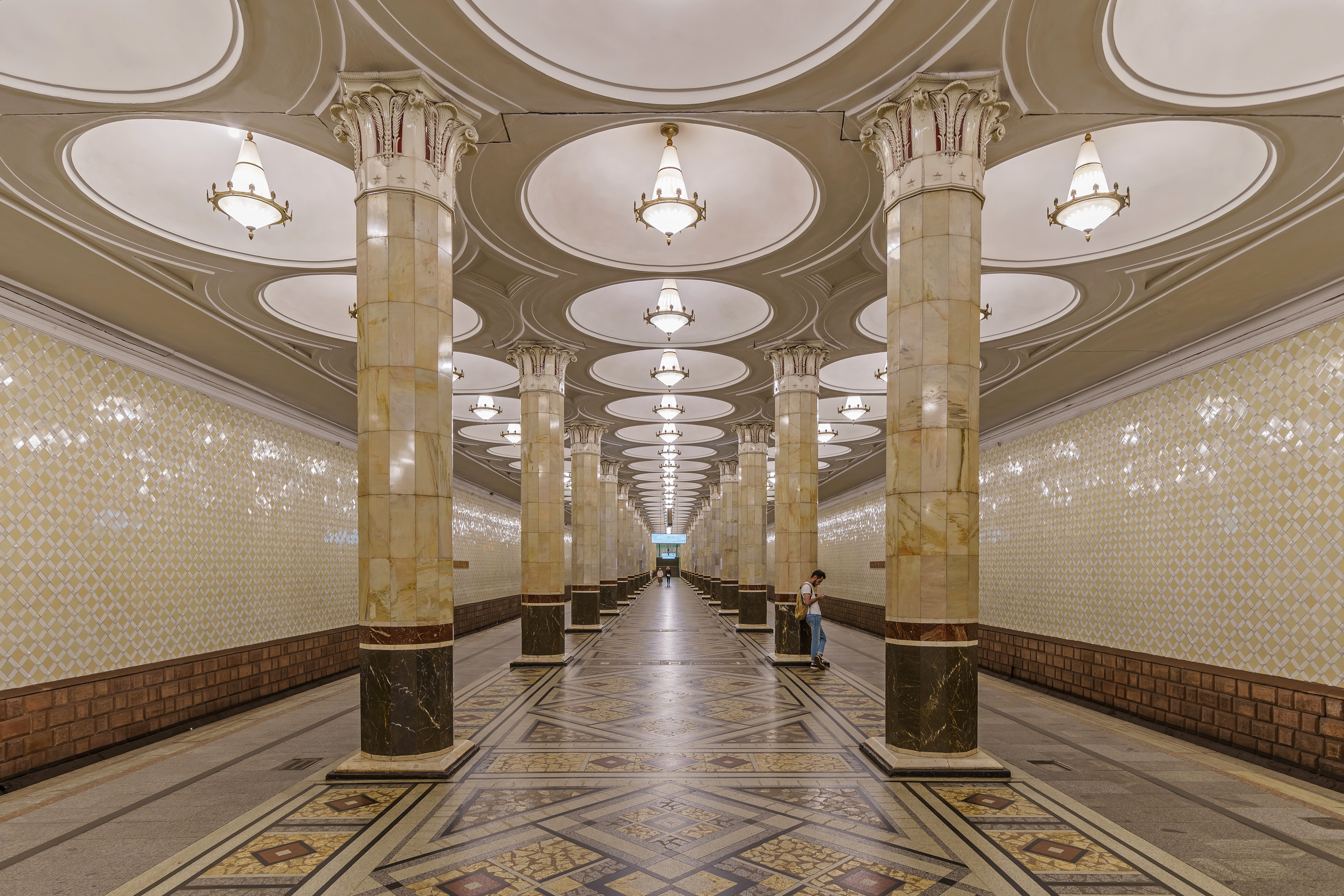
Kiyevskaya station

After the line lost its terminus, its passenger flow dropped substantially, making it more local. Presently work is planned to upgrade the surface stations, and to finish replacement of the rolling stock. The branch service originally having 15 minute intervals now has 5 min which makes 1:1 ratio of trains traveling from Aleksandrovsky Sad. There are expansion plans westward from Kuntsevskaya station.
