= Revolution Square =

Revolution Square may refer to:

- The Plaza de la Revolución in Havana, Cuba.
- The Plaza de la Revolución in Managua, Nicaragua.
- Piaţa Revoluţiei in central Bucharest.
- Revolyutsii Square in Moscow, Russia.
- Revolution Square (Maribor), a square in the town of Maribor, northeastern Slovenia.
- Republic Square (Ljubljana), formerly called Revolution Square, a square in Ljubljana, the capital of Slovenia.
- Congress Square, formerly (1945–1974) called Revolution Square, a square in Ljubljana, the capital of Slovenia.
