= Gorbusha =

Gorbusha may refer to:

- Gorbusha, Moscow Oblast, a settlement in Moscow Oblast, Russia
- Gorbusha, Vologda Oblast, a village in Vologda Oblast, Russia
- Gorbusha, a former settlement in Primorsky Krai, Russian SFSR; now a part of the town of Dalnegorsk

== See also ==
- Gorbushka, a market place in Moscow
