= Markets in Moscow =

This is a list of markets in Moscow. The city has a vibrant history of formal and informal markets.

== Operational markets ==
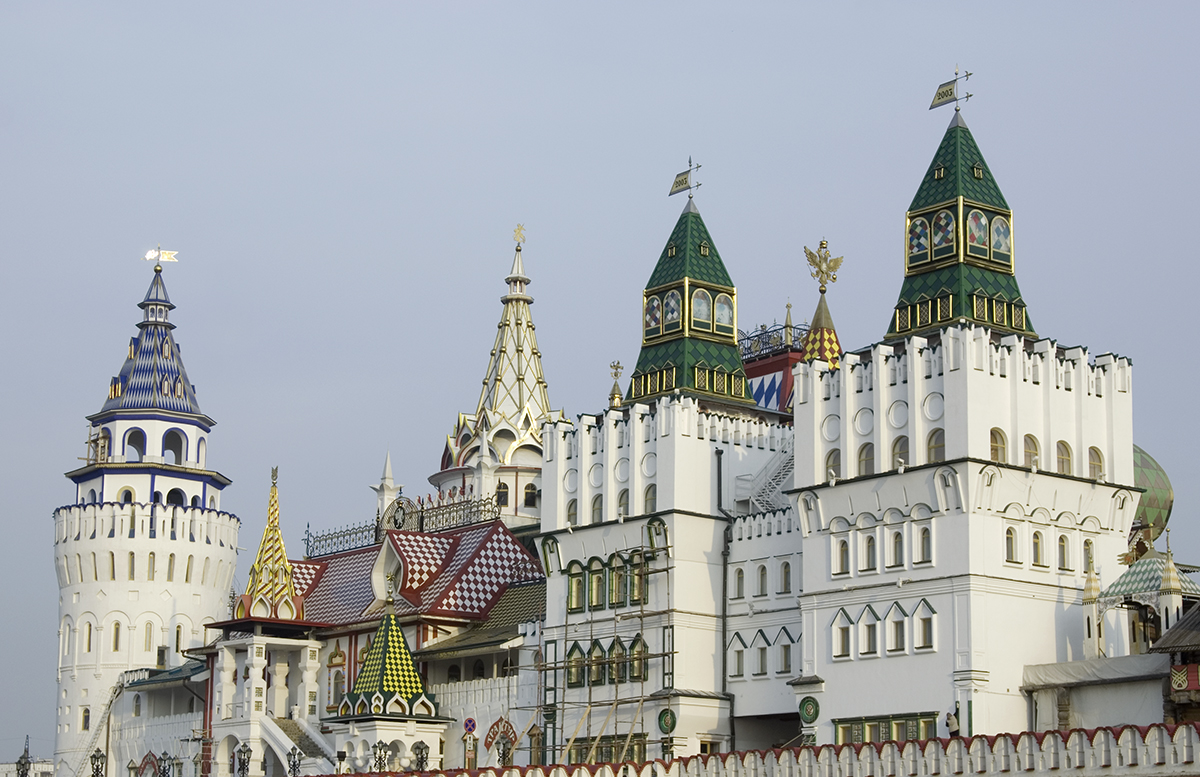
the Izmailovsky Market

- Hotel Sevastopol - Run by Afghan traders.
- Izmailovsky Market - Souvenir and flea market and a culture center.
- Gorbushka - Electronics market.

== Defunct markets ==
- Luzhniki market
- Cherkizovsky market
