= Four Seasons Hotel Moscow =

Hotel in Moscow, Russia

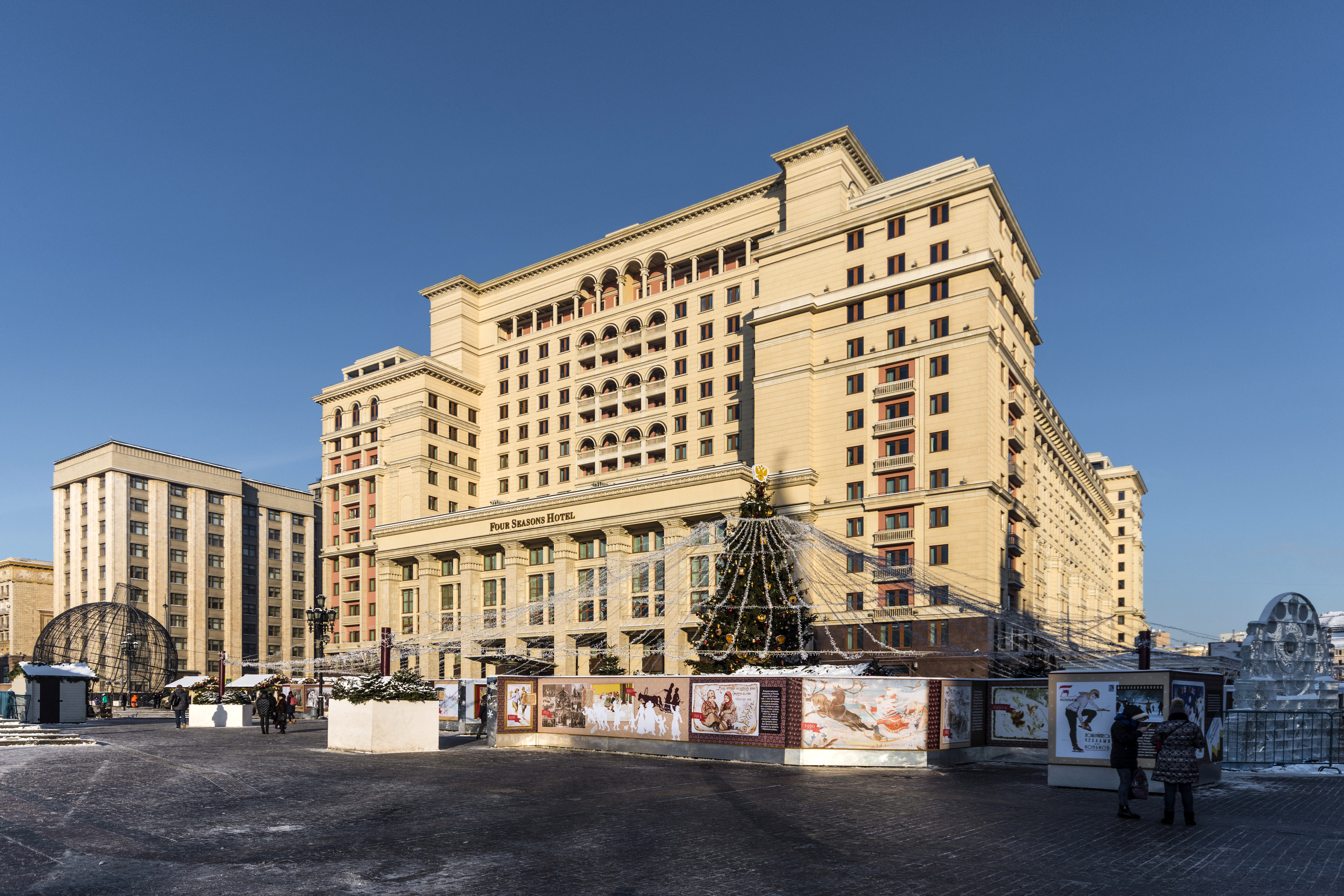
- Four Seasons Hotel Moscow, main facade on Manezhnaya Square

- Location within Central Moscow

General information
- Location: Moscow, Russia
- Coordinates: 55°45′25″N 37°37′00″E
- Opening: December 1935 (original building); October 30, 2014 (current building)

Technical details
- Floor count: 15

Design and construction
- Architect: Alexey Shchusev

Other information
- Number of rooms: 180

Website
- Official website

The Four Seasons Hotel Moscow is a modern luxury hotel in Manezhnaya Square in the Tverskoy District, central Moscow, Russia. It opened on October 30, 2014, with a facade that replicates the Soviet Hotel Moskva of the 1930s (Russian: Гости́ница «Москва́»), which previously stood on the same location. It is located near Red Square, and in close proximity to the pre-revolutionary City Hall.

It was operated by Four Seasons Hotels and Resorts from its opening until 2022, when the chain ceased managing the hotel due to economic sanctions imposed on Russia resulting from the Russian invasion of Ukraine. The hotel continues to use the name, though it is no longer part of the international chain.

== History ==
=== Original structure ===
The area now occupied by the hotel, Okhotny Ryad, was considered one of the most unsanitary districts in Moscow at the start of the 20th century due to its open-air market trade. It was the first Moscow district to undergo major reconstruction during the 1920s. Plans for a Palace of Labour on the site dated to 1922, but financial difficulties delayed construction. Demolition of market stalls in the southern part of Okhotny Ryad began in 1924, and the Church of Paraskeva Pyatnitsa was demolished in 1928, with all market trade relocated to Tsvetnoy Boulevard.

In mid-1931, an open competition was announced for a new hotel to be built for the Moscow Soviet. Six projects were submitted, from architects at Gosproekt, Mosstroy, Panteleimon Golosov, and the Institute of Structures. When the open competition produced no satisfactory result, Mossoviet commissioned a closed internal competition among staff at Mosproekt. Three teams competed: one from the studio of Alexey Shchusev, led by O. A. Stapran and L. I. Savelyev with Shchusev as consultant; a second team advised by Moisei Ginzburg; and a third project by the German architect Bruno Taut, who was working in Moscow at the time.

The project by Stapran and Savelyev was selected as the winner and taken forward for construction. The original design was in the Constructivist style, which sat in obvious tension with the established historic character of the surrounding district. Its austere massing did not harmonise with the Moscow Kremlin, the buildings of Okhotny Ryad, or the streetscapes of Tverskaya Street and Mokhovaya Street. This conflict reflected the broader shift underway in Soviet architecture in the early 1930s, away from avant-garde movements and toward a reinterpretation of classical heritage, which eventually produced the style known as Stalinist Empire style.

The first Hotel Moskva was built in sections from 1932 to 1938. The partially-completed hotel opened on December 20, 1935.

Alexey Shchusev was brought in as co-author to correct perceived shortcomings in the original design. By the time he joined, the structural frame was already nearing completion, leaving little room for major changes. Working within these constraints, Shchusev introduced a restrained neoclassical decorative layer without disrupting the building's Constructivist structure. His additions included an eight-column portico rising six storeys with an open terrace, spacious loggia arcades along the centre of the main facade, and numerous balconies. Corner towers accented the building's edges. The main facade gained a more pronounced articulation, giving the overall composition greater plasticity.

The building was designed with varied floor heights from the outset: the main facade rose to 14 storeys, while the wing facing Okhotny Ryad reached 10. After the demolition of an entire block of buildings in 1938, including the Eksportkhlib building and the Loskutnaya Hotel, the central facade gained a direct opening onto Manezhnaya Square and was oriented toward the proposed Palace of Soviets, with which it was intended to form an architectural ensemble.

The hotel was notable for its use of two different designs for the wings off the central structure. The most popular (possibly apocryphal) explanation is that Shchusev submitted a single conceptual drawing of the facade to Stalin, with one half showing one design option and the other half a different design option for the wings of the building. According to the story, Stalin signed off on the drawing, without noticing the two options. Afraid of informing Stalin that he had failed to select a design, the decision was made to simply construct one wing of each design option, on either side of the building. One included large windows and a more ornate facade, while the other maintained the smaller windows and simpler details of the rest of the hotel's facade. The lobby of the original hotel contained an entrance to the Moscow Metro Okhotny Ryad station. Anti-aircraft guns were installed atop the hotel during the Battle of Moscow. The label of Stolichnaya vodka features a line drawing of the hotel.

=== Second phase ===
Shchusev prepared sketches for the second phase of the hotel during the 1930s, but construction of the additional wings did not begin until 1968. A 10-storey wing facing Revolution Square (towards the Lenin Museum) and a 6-storey wing facing Teatralnaya Square were built by architects A. B. Boretsky, A. A. Dzerzhkovich, I. E. Rozhin, D. S. Solopov, and V. A. Shchelkanovtseva, who broadly respected the compositional approach of the original design.

The Hotel Moskva was expanded in 1977, for the 60th anniversary of the October Revolution. With the completion of these wings, the hotel complex occupied an entire city block. Critics noted that the detailing of the new wings was drier in character than the original building, and that the 6-storey wing in particular was resolved as a plain concrete box, introducing what some specialists described as a sharp dissonance into the ensemble of Teatralnaya Square.

=== Modern Structure ===
The original structure had become too dated to serve the needs of a first class hotel, so it was completely demolished and replaced with a replica, which added modern facilities inside and an underground parking garage. Moscow Mayor Yuri Luzhkov ordered the demolition in 2004 over the objections of preservation advocates. Following the demolition, the newly opened view of the Kremlin and surrounding historic fabric prompted renewed calls to abandon the reconstruction project and create a public park on the site instead, but city authorities, who were co-investors in the new building, did not reverse course.

The new building was designed by architect V. V. Kolosnitsyn of GUP Mosproekt-2. The developer was OAO Dekmos, with construction carried out by ZAO Strabag, the Russian arm of the Austrian construction group Strabag SE. In the summer of 2005, 1,160 kg of TNT from the Second World War was recovered from the construction pit. The explosives are believed to have been placed in the hotel's basement in 1941 to destroy the building in the event of the city's capture.

The first portion of the new complex, facing Revolution Square, was built on the site of the dismantled 1977 wing. Housing offices and a shopping center, Fashion Season, it opened in 2012.

The hotel portion, on the site of the 1935 building, replicates the iconic facade, following Shchusev's exterior plans as accurately as possible. The total floor area of the complex is 183,000 m². It opened on October 25, 2014 as the Four Seasons Hotel Moscow. The hotel's 180 rooms carry some of the highest room rates in Moscow. The complex also includes retail space, offices, a congress centre, and a cinema called Moskva, whose 17 screens seat a total of 343 people.

During construction, more than $87 million of city-allocated funds were reported stolen by unknown parties.

As of 2016, Russian businessman Alexey Khotin owned the hotel. Four Seasons Hotels ceased managing the hotel in March 2022, due to economic sanctions following the Russian invasion of Ukraine, but the hotel continues to use their name, although it is no longer associated with the chain.

== In culture ==
- The silhouette of the Hotel Moskva appears on the label of Stolichnaya vodka.
- The hotel's design history features in Anatoly Rybakov's novel Children of the Arbat and in Viktor Suvorov's book Control.
- The 1936 film Circus, directed by Grigori Alexandrov, shows a view of Teatralnaya Square from the hotel's rooftop restaurant.

== Gallery ==
Hotel Moskva/Four Seasons Hotel Moscow

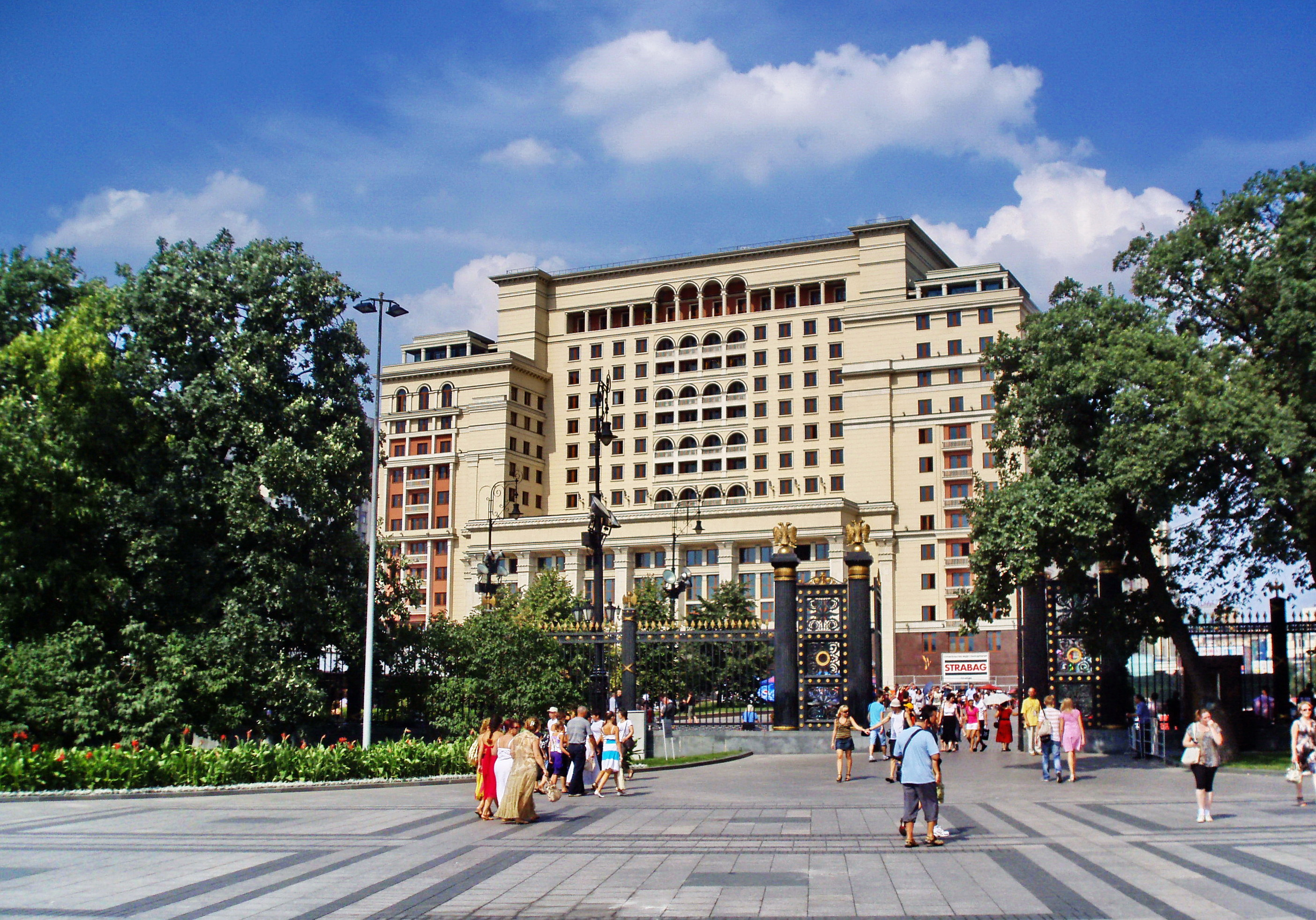
Four Seasons Hotel Moscow

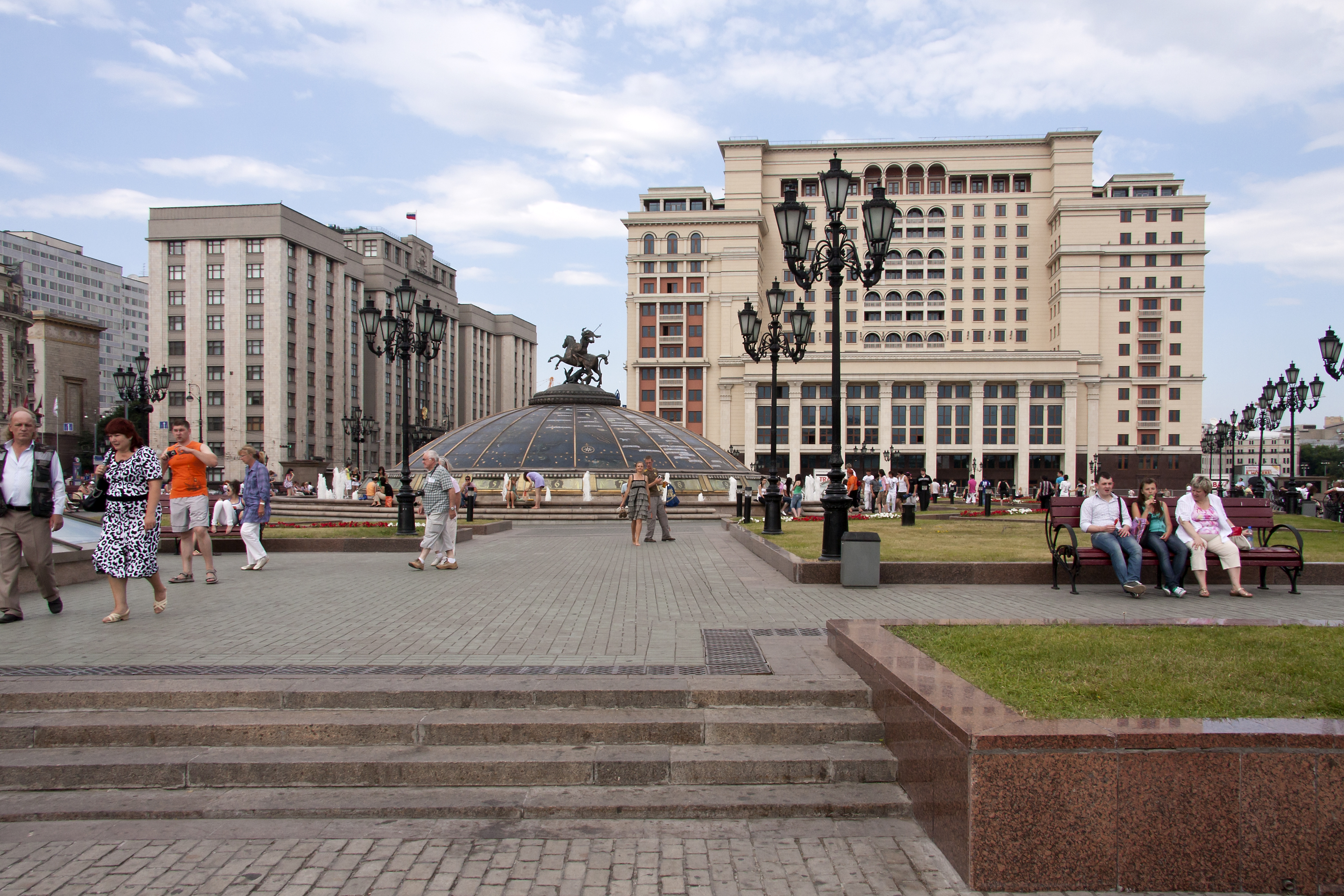
Four Seasons Hotel Moscow, with Manezhnaya Square in foreground

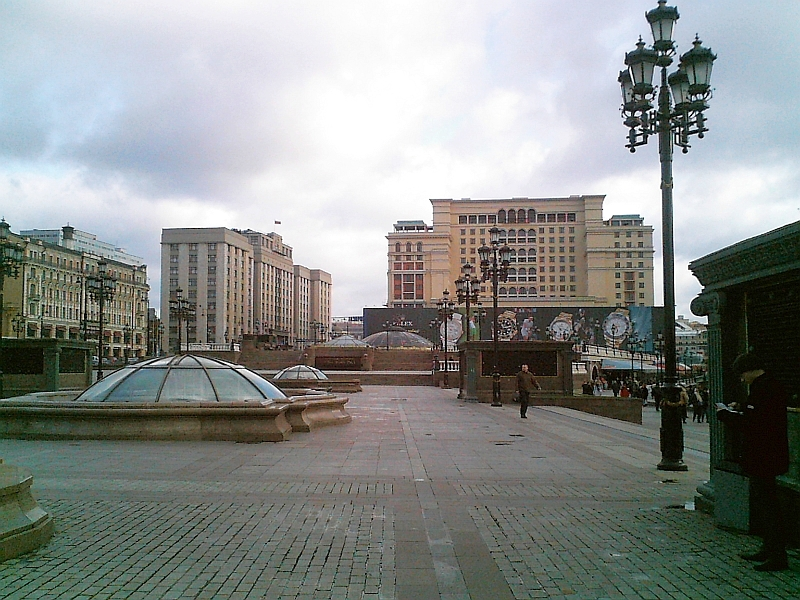
Four Seasons Hotel Moscow under construction facing Manezhnaya Square, 2008

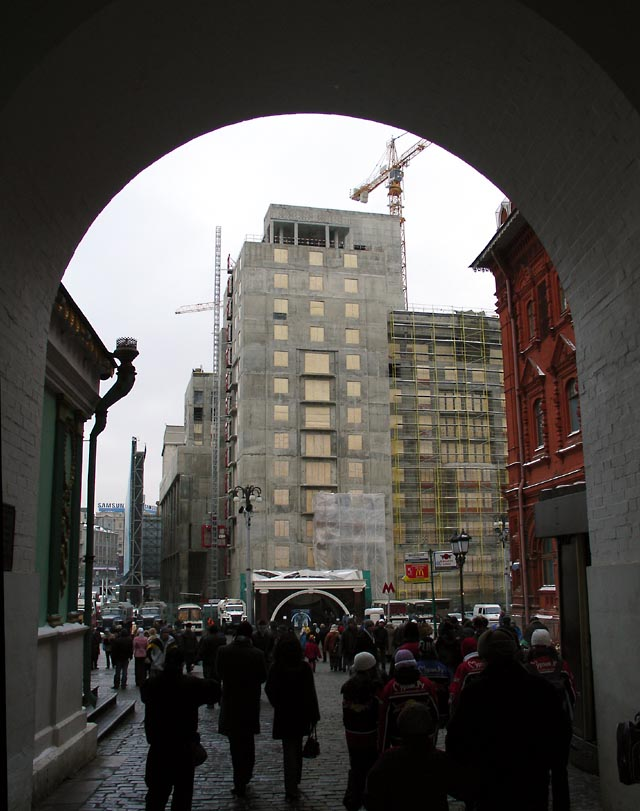
Construction of the Four Seasons Hotel Moscow, 2007

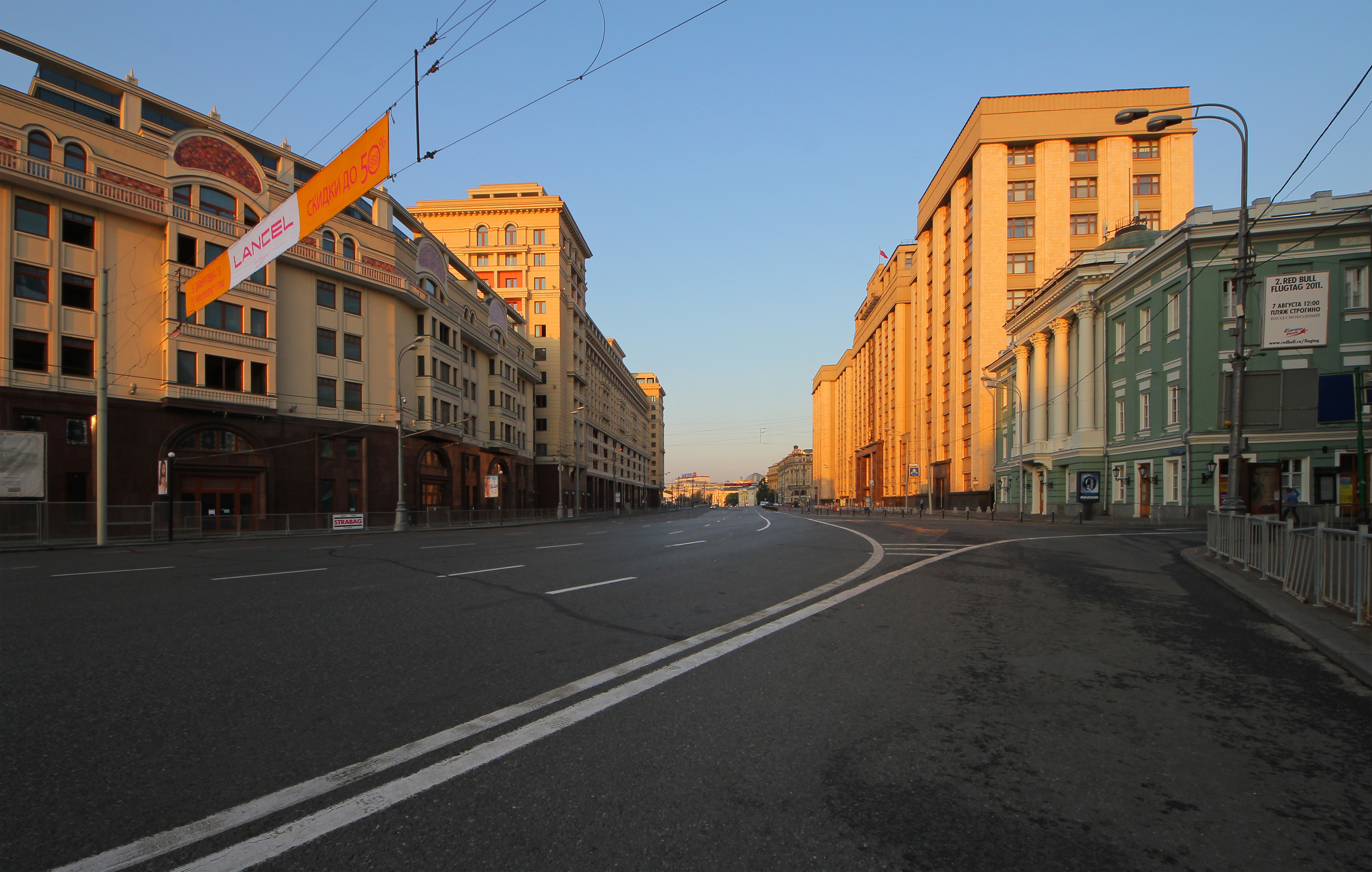
Okhotny Ryad Street, with Fashion Season mall on the left and the Four Seasons Hotel Moscow in the distance

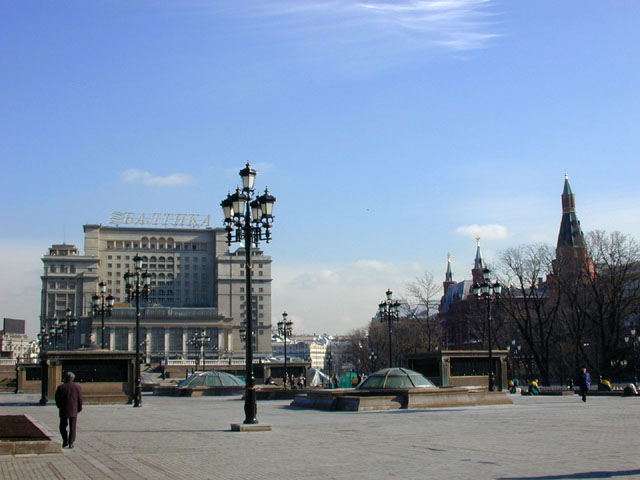
The original Hotel Moskva just before demolition, with a huge neon sign on top advertising Baltika Beer

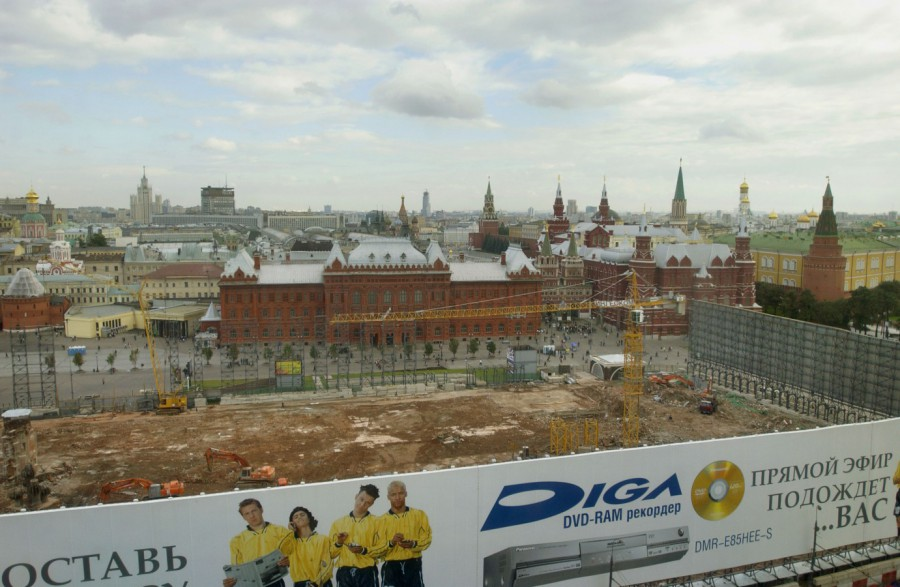
After the demolition of the 1935 building

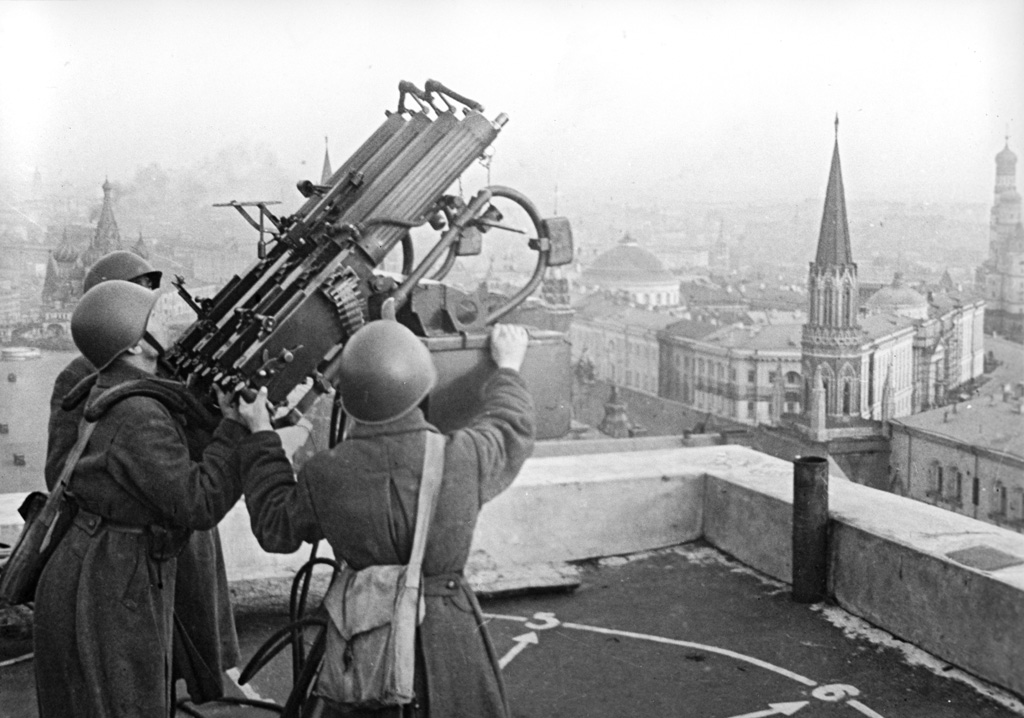
Anti-aircraft gunners on the roof of the Hotel Moskva during the Battle of Moscow in 1941

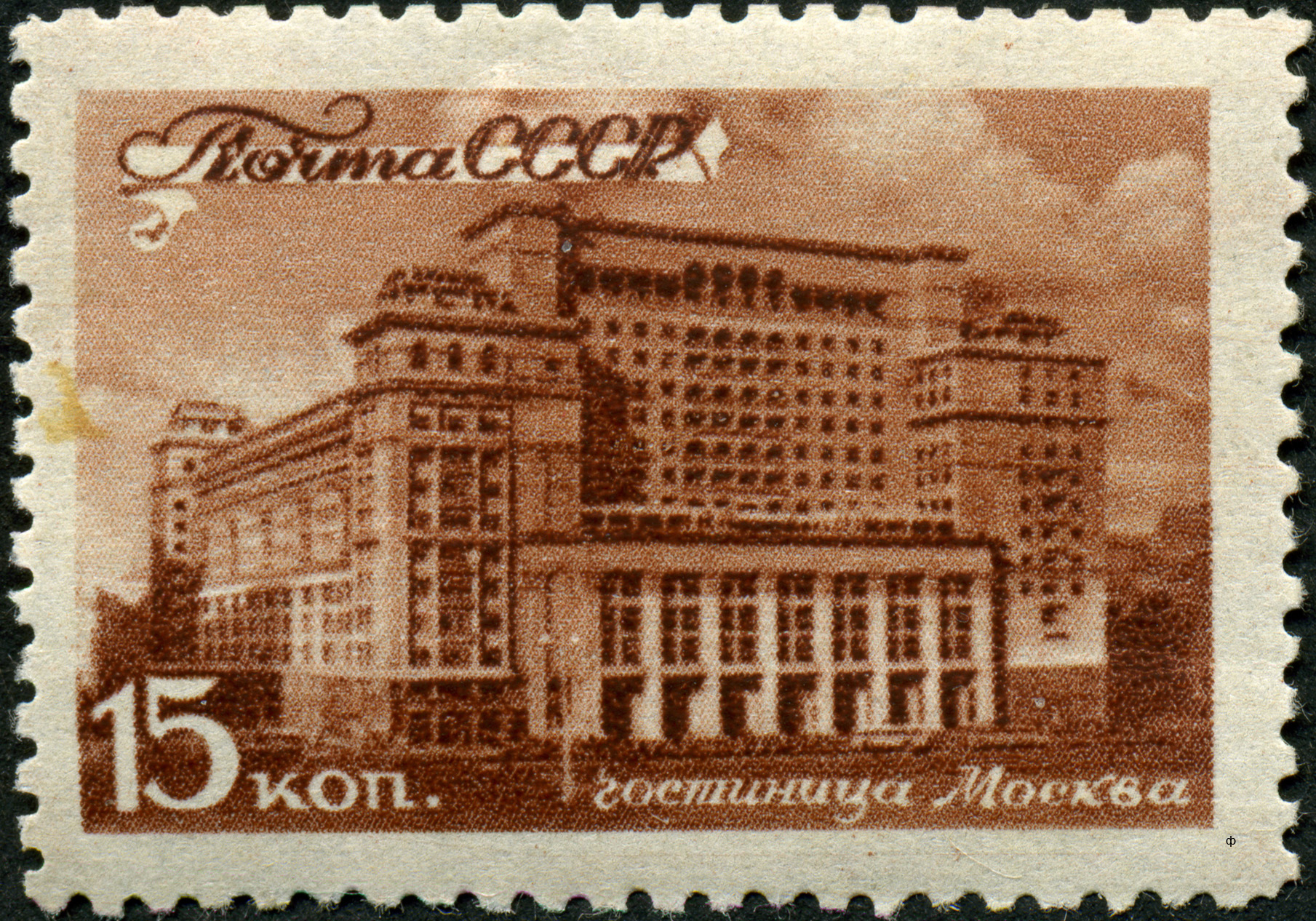
Soviet stamp showing the Hotel Moskva

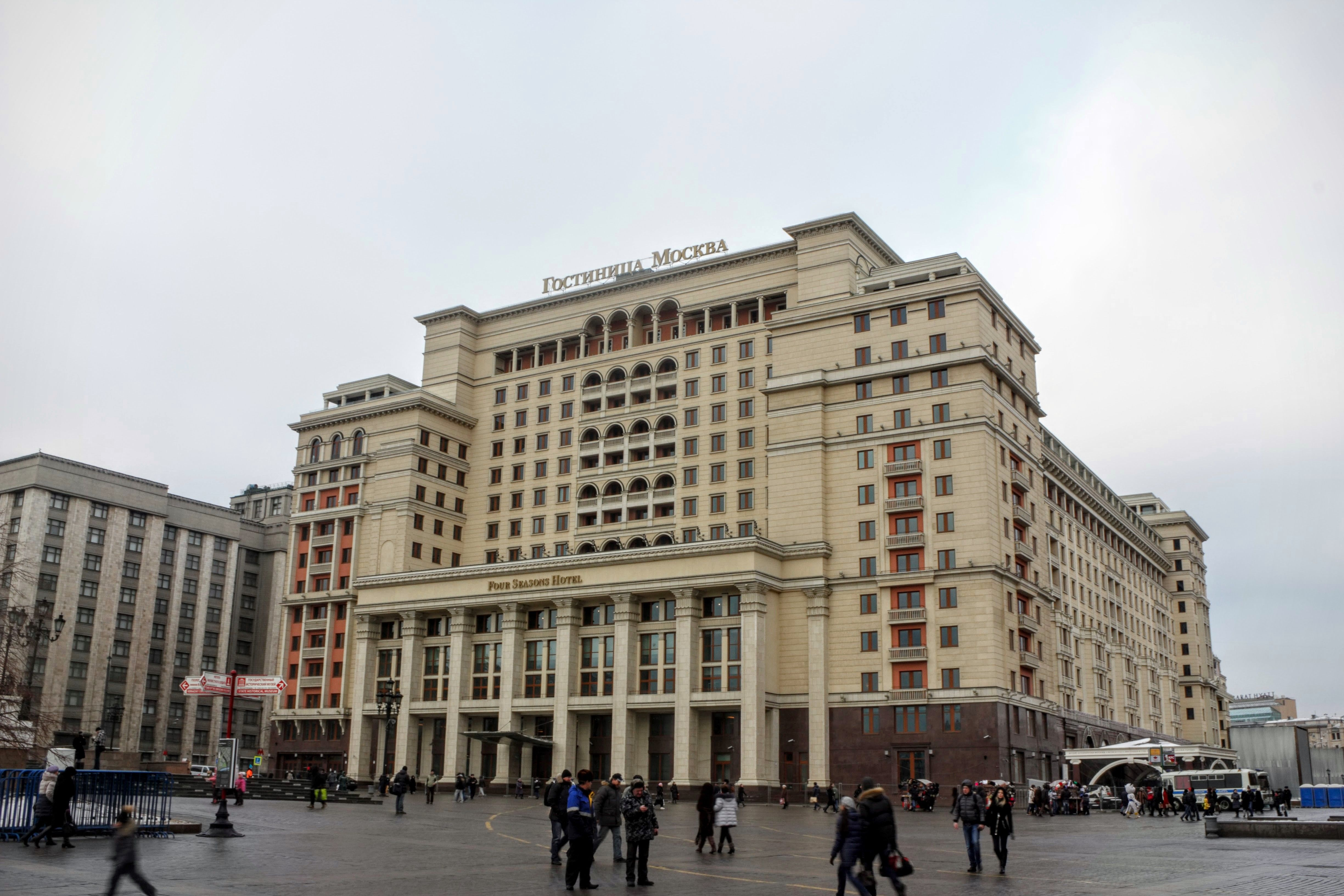
Facade of the Four Seasons hotel in the winter
