= Alexey Khotin =

Russian businessman

- Алексе́й Ю́рьевич Хо́тин
- Born: Alexey Yurievich Khotin; May 21, 1974 (age 52); Minsk, USSR
- Education: Minsk Suvorov Military College (1991); Plekhanov Russian University of Economics (1997)
- Occupation: Entrepreneur
- Children: 2

Alexey Yurievich Khotin (Russian: Алексей Юрьевич Хотин, Belarusian: Аляксей Хоцін; born May 21, 1974) is a Russian businessman of Belarusian origin. He is one of the wealthiest individuals in Russia, and in 2016 Forbes magazine ranked him 95th in its list of the top 100 richest Russians.

His business interests extend across a range of sectors, including banking, real estate, oil and gas production, and other industries.

== Biography and family ==
Khotin was born in 1974 in Minsk (then in the Byelorussian SSR). In 1991 he graduated from Minsk Suvorov Military School. In 1997 he also graduated from Plekhanov Russian University of Economics.

Khotin is known to maintain (or hold) many of his businesses together with his father, Yuri Khotin. He is married and has two children.

== Business ==
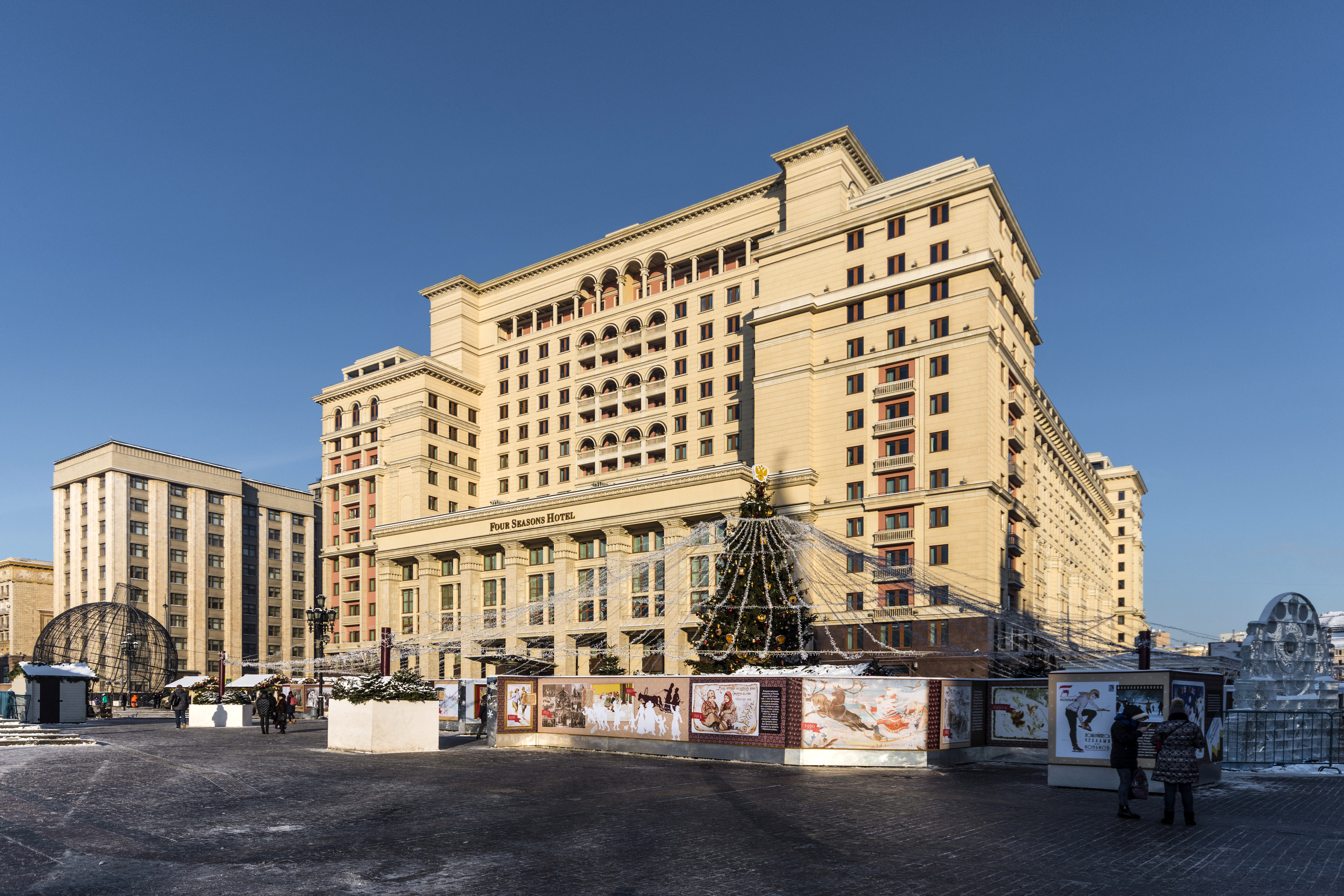
Former Soviet "Hotel Moscow", situated between Moscow Kremlin and State Duma, one of the Khotin's most famous assets

He is known as holder and maintainer of many various businesses which include famous Four Seasons Hotel Moscow (former Soviet "Hotel Moscow" situated next to Moscow Kremlin). He also was reported to possess shopping center Gorbushkin Dvor, formerly known as Gorbushka, famous among many Russians in 1990s for selling music disks (later it was revealed that its actual owner is Khotin's business partner Sergey Podlisetsky, but Khotin did help him to acquire it).

Overall, the Khotin family is reported to control over 30 real-estate objects in Moscow with a total area of 1.8 million square metres.

Since 1996, Khotin was involved in several industrial activities: military equipment, chemical feedstock, FMCG and food. Within these activities, he is reported to create about 30 enterprises with more than 8000 work places.

From 2001 to 2003 he served as Vice President of Moscow Association of Organizations of Chemical Complex.

In 2011, he was reported to acquire major stock in Exillon Energy oil company which operates in Northern Russian regions and is listed at London Stock Exchange. He also controls an oil company called Dulisma, holds stakes in Kuwait Energy and other hydrocarbon mining companies. Oil production of Khotin's companies as of 2016 amounts at near 2.5 million tons per year.

He is also reported to hold nowadays more than a half of Yugra Bank through Swiss/Cyprus company Radamant Financial. Yugra Bank is named after Russian northern Yugra region where big amounts of oil and gas are mined. As of 2016 the bank is considered to be the 30th largest in Russia.

Vedomosti newspaper emphasizes that Khotin family has ties with many of the top Russian officials, and these ties are likely to positively influence on their businesses. The newspaper also say the family members generally refuse to talk to mass media.

In 2020, it was reported that Khotin's Yugra Bank transferred at least $330 million to Deutsche Bank Trust Company Americas in New York between 2012-2013.

== Sponsorship in sports ==
Khotin is a sportsman and holds the title of Master of Sports in swimming. He finances several sports organizations: International Sambo Federation, All-Russian Practical Shooting Federation, Dynamo Mini-football Club and the Night Hockey League (the latter was founded in 2011 by Vladimir Putin).
