= Iberian Gate and Chapel =

Gate of Kitay-gorod in Moscow, Russia

Coordinates: 55°45′20″N 37°37′05″E

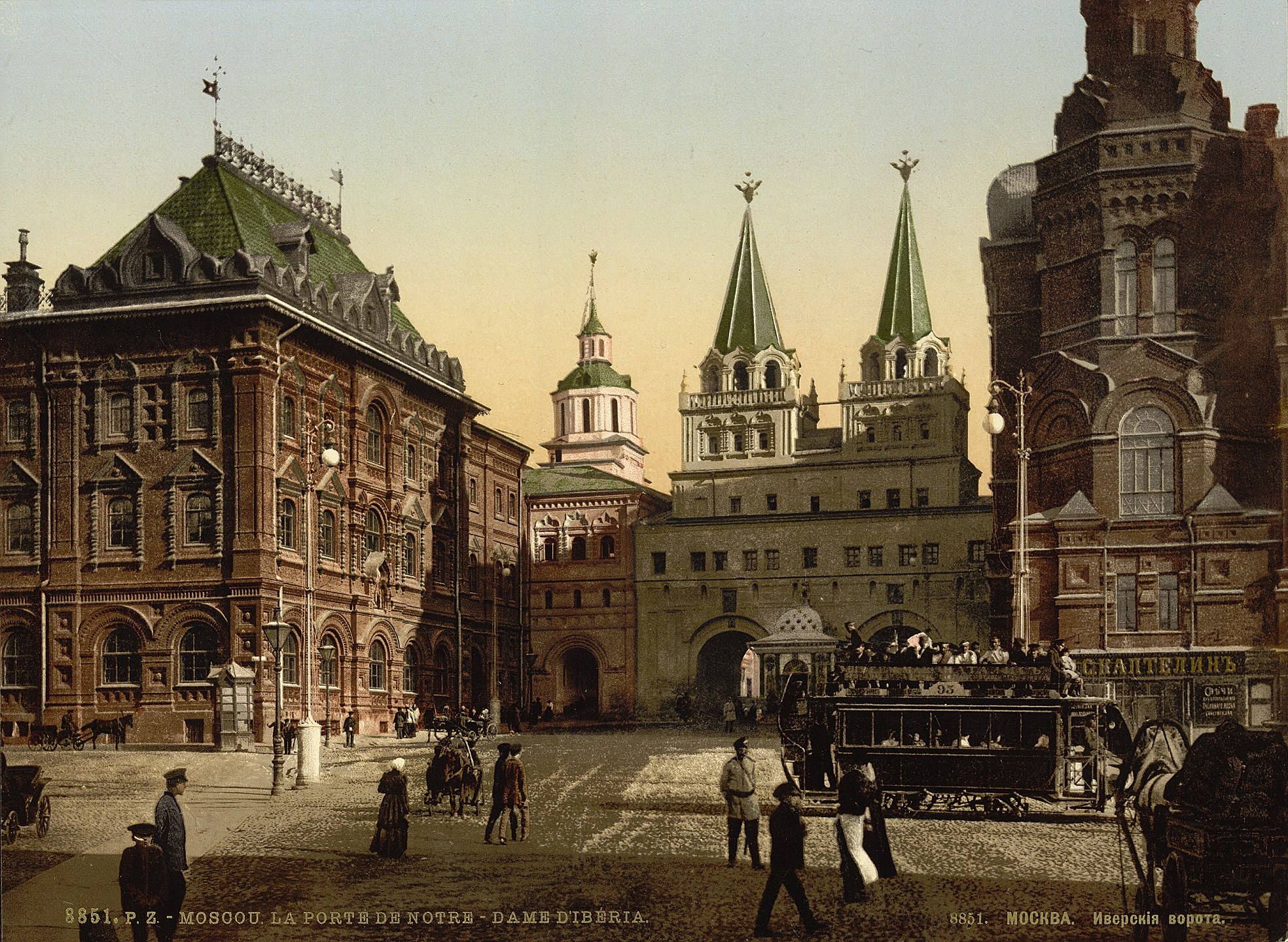
The gate and chapel are wedged between the Moscow City Hall (to the left) and the State Historical Museum (to the right), 19th-century postcard.

Resurrection Gate (Russian: Воскресенские ворота, romanized: Voskresenskiye vorota) or Iberian Gate (Russian: Иверские ворота, romanized: Iverskiye vorota) is the only remaining gate of Kitay-gorod in Moscow, Russia. It connects the north-western end of Red Square with Manege Square and gives its name to nearby Voskresenskaya Square (Resurrection Square, renamed Revolution Square in 1918). The gate adjoins the ornate building of the Moscow City Hall to the east and the State Historical Museum to the west. Just in front of the chapel is a bronze plaque marking kilometre zero of the Russian highway system.

Destroyed in 1931 by the Soviet regime, the gate and the chapel were rebuilt in the 1990s.

== History ==
=== Resurrection Gate ===
The first stone gate leading to Red Square was erected in 1535, when the Kitai-gorod wall was being reconstructed in brick. When the structure was rebuilt in 1680, the double passage was surmounted with two-storey chambers crowned by two octagonal hipped roofs similar to the Kremlin towers. An Icon of the Resurrection was placed on the gate facing towards Red Square, from which the gate derives its name.

Until 1731, the chambers above the gate were shared by the neighbouring Mint and the Central Drug Store. After Mikhail Lomonosov founded the Moscow University in the latter structure, the university press moved into the gate chambers. Nikolay Novikov, who ran the press in the late 18th century, turned the second storey into his headquarters.

=== Iveron Chapel ===
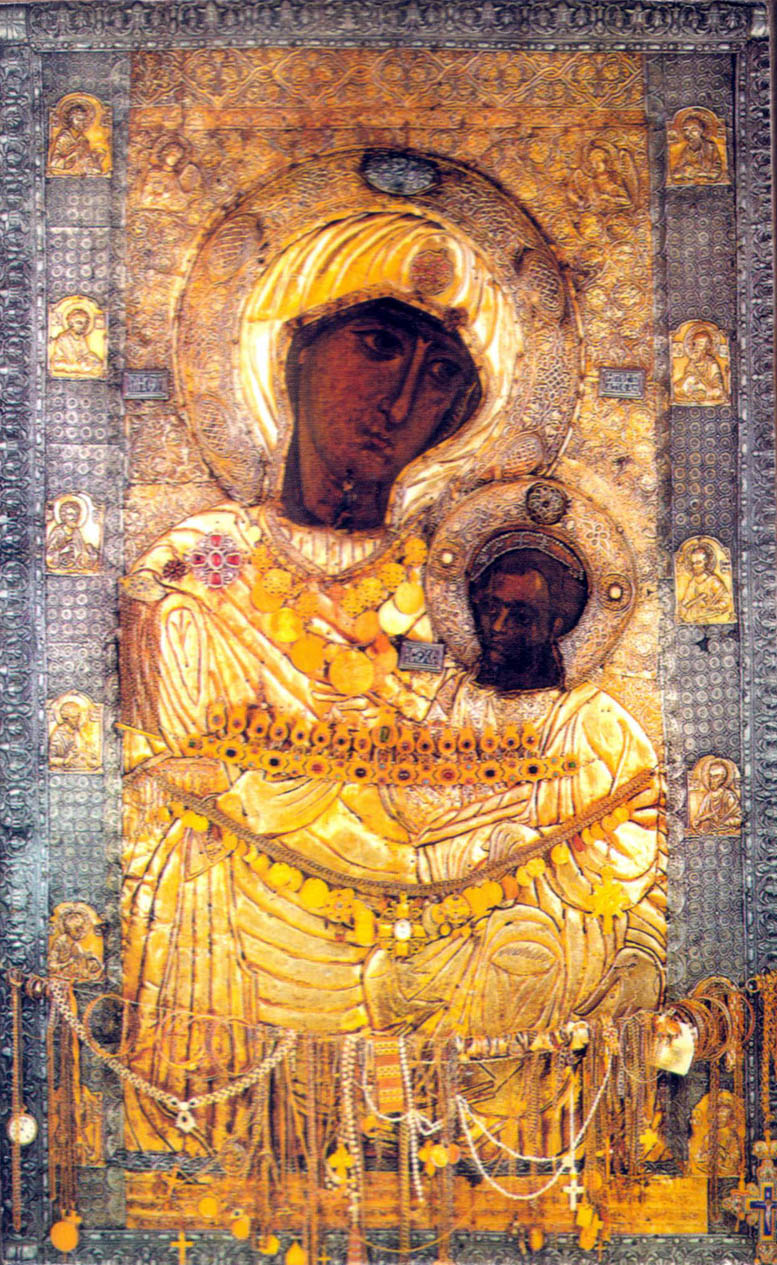
Our Lady of Iveron, Mount Athos, Greece

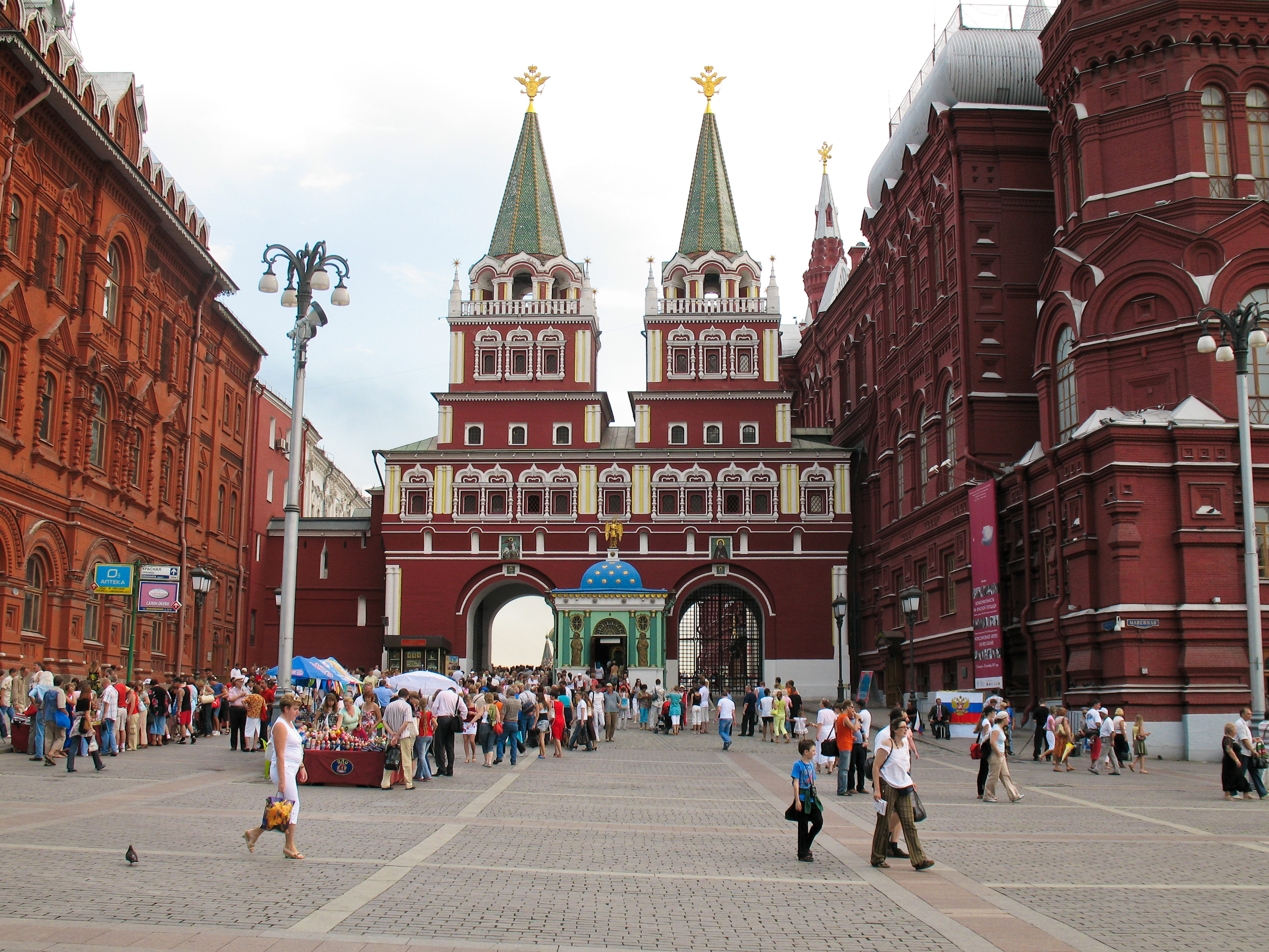
The heavenly blue, star-studded dome of the little chapel is sandwiched between the twin arches of the gate.

Since 1669, the wooden chapel in front of the gate (facing away from Red Square) has housed a replica of the miracle-working icon of Panaghia Portaitissa ("keeper of the gate"), the prototype of which is preserved in the Georgian Iveron monastery on Mount Athos. Hence, the name Iversky (that is, "Iberian") that stuck both to the chapel and the gate. In 1781, the Nikolo-Perervinsky Monastery constructed a new brick chapel on the spot. The star-splattered cupola of the structure was topped with a statue of an angel bearing a cross.

According to a popular custom, everyone heading for Red Square or the Kremlin visited the chapel to pay homage at the shrine, before entering through the gate. Beggars and outlaws would pray there next to the highest royalty and even the Tsar himself. It was there that the rebel Emelyan Pugachev asked the Russian people for forgiveness a few hours before his execution. The ever-overcrowded chapel, with candles burning day and night, figures in works by Leo Tolstoy, Ivan Bunin, Marina Tsvetayeva, and H. G. Wells, to name only a few.

=== Destruction and rebuilding ===
In 1931, the Resurrection Gate and the chapel were demolished by the Soviet regime in order to make room for heavy military vehicles driving through Red Square during Soviet military parades. Both structures were completely rebuilt in 1994–1995 after the fall of the USSR, and a new icon of the Iveron Theotokos was painted on Mount Athos to replace the original.

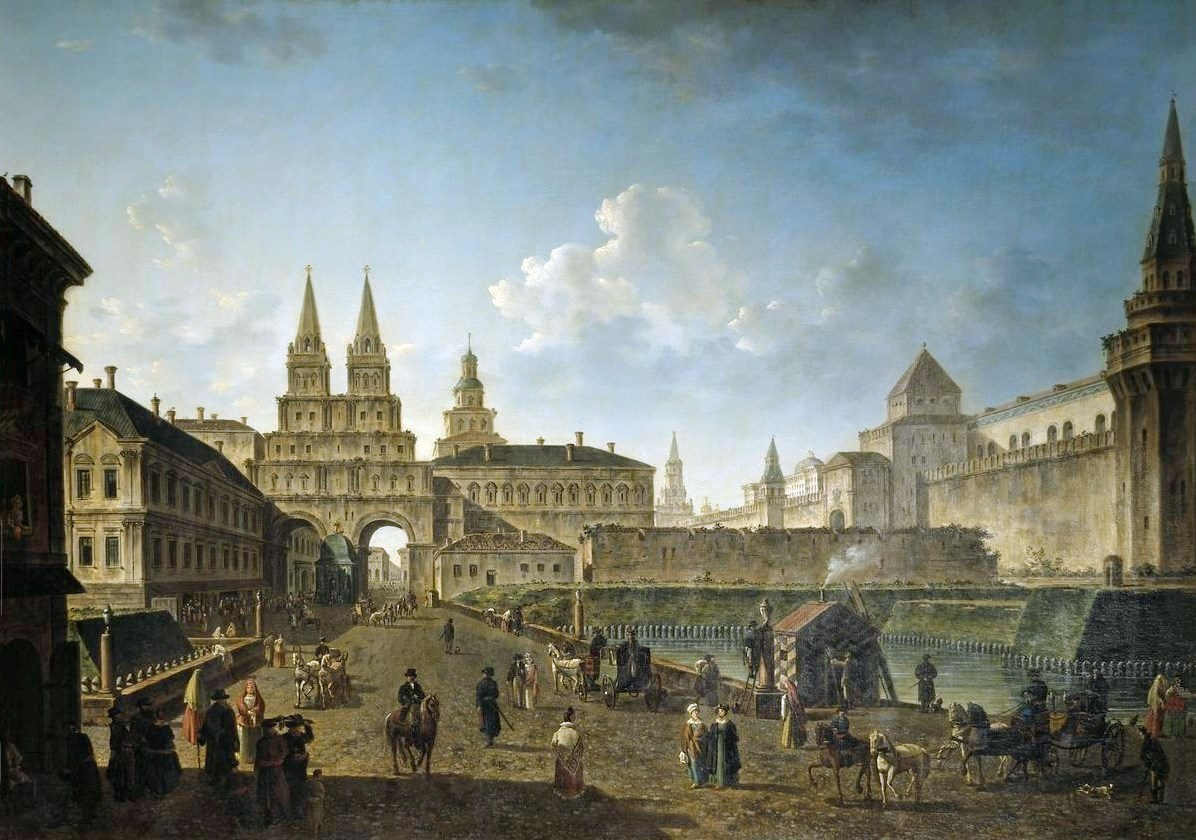
View of the gate at the turn of the 19th century.

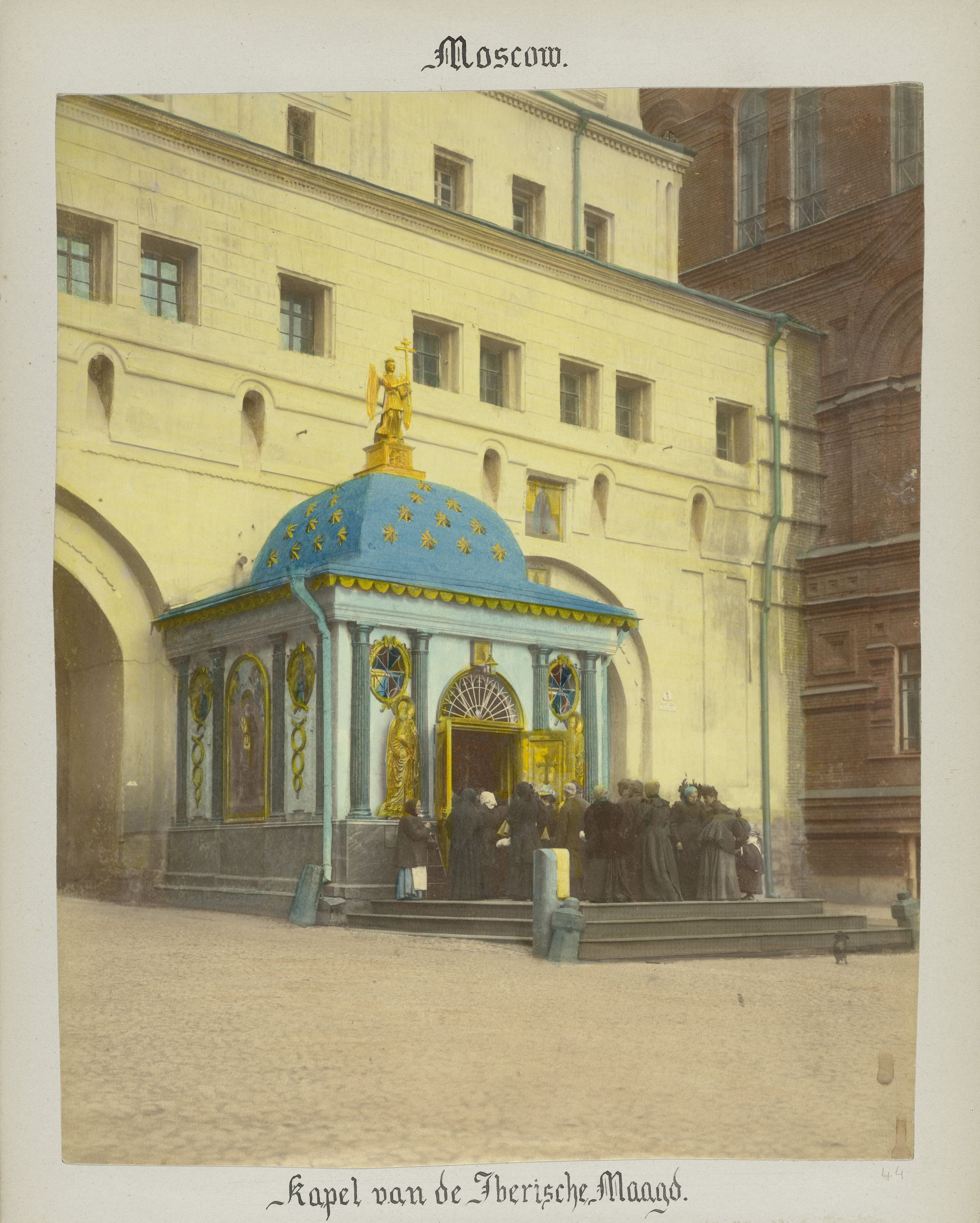
The gate in 1898

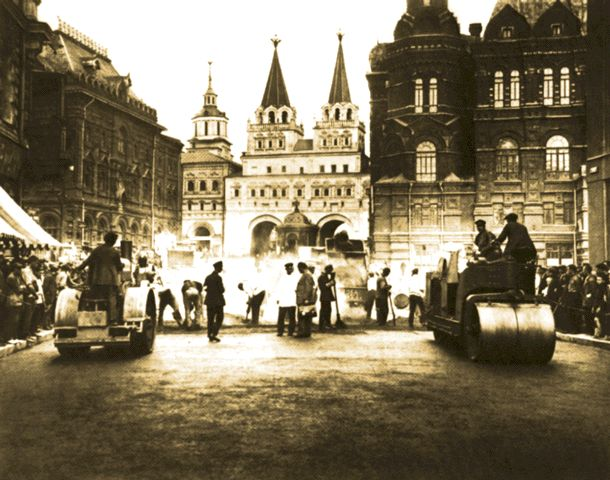
The gate and chapel before their destruction in 1929.

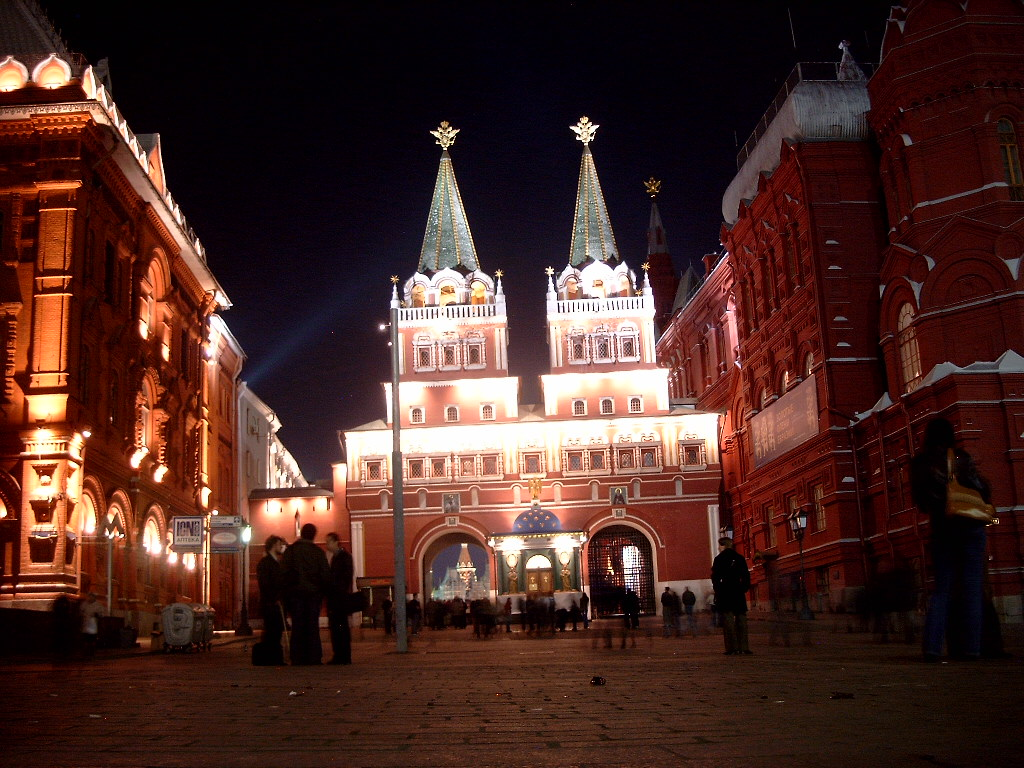
The restored gate and chapel at night.

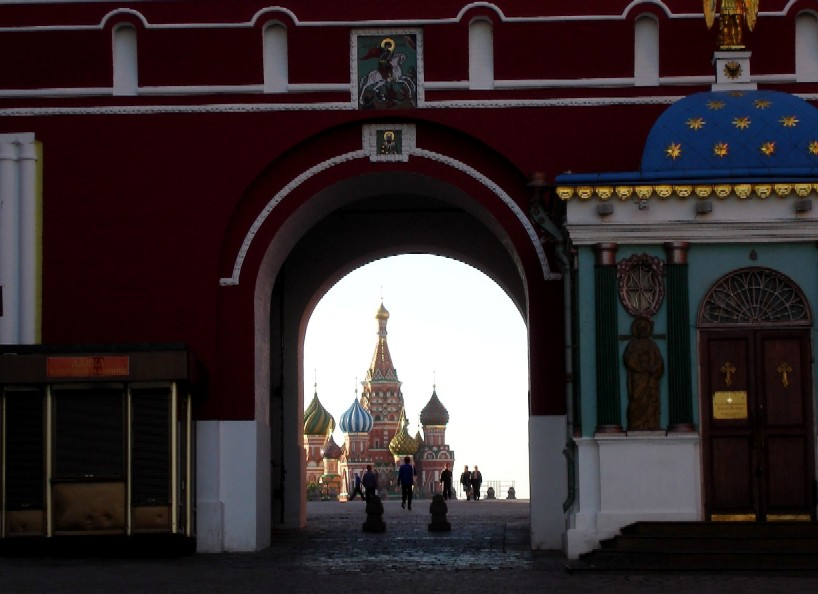
View through the gate toward Saint Basil's Cathedral.
