= Gorbunov Palace of Culture =

Russian concert hall

Coordinates: 55°45′00″N 37°29′49″E

- Interactive map of Gorbunov Palace of Culture
- Location: Moscow
- Type: concert hall
- Events: live concerts, rock concerts

Construction
- Built: In the style of constructivism in 1929–1938

The Gorbunov Palace of Culture (Russian: Дворец культуры имени Горбунова, romanized: Dvorets kul'tury imeni Gorbunova) is a palace of culture and a popular concert hall in the west of Moscow, best known for rock concerts and live records by various bands. Initially, the house of culture was called the Palace of the Kievsky district of Moscow and was created as part of the infrastructure of the aircraft factory. The building was constructed in the style of constructivism in 1929–1938. The palace is named after aircraft design engineer Sergey Gorbunov.

Among the bands that have played concerts at Gorbunov Palace are Jethro Tull, Einstürzende Neubauten, Coil, Diamanda Galas, Nightwish, Therion, Laibach, Lacrimosa, DDT, Boris Grebenshchikov, Krematorij and others, "Nashestvie" (1999) and "Uchites plavat" (1995—1997) festivals.

== Architecture ==
The building's exterior conforms to the Constructivist style, while the interior is decorated in the Art Deco style. The formal façade is combined with large glazing allowing plenty of natural light to enter. The outline of the building is reminiscent of an aeroplane wing, which emphasises its belonging to an aircraft factory.

Two wings of the cultural centre are connected by crosswalks on the first and second floors.

== See also ==
- Gorbushka
