= Exillon Energy =

Exillon Energy plc
- Company type: Public
- Traded as: LSE: EXI (2009-2020)
- Industry: Oil exploration and production
- Founded: 2009
- Headquarters: Uray, Russia
- Key people: Sergey Koshelenko, Chairman; Dmitry Margelov, CEO
- Revenue: US$321.5 million (2013)
- Operating income: US$91.10 million (2013)
- Net income: US$31.6 million (2013)
- Website: www.exillonenergy.com

Exillon Energy plc is a Russian oil exploration and production company with assets in two oil-rich regions of Northern Russia: Exillon TP in Timan-Pechora and Exillon WS in Western Siberia. It was listed on the London Stock Exchange until 2020.

== History ==
The Company was established by Maksat Arip, a Kazakh businessman, in January 2009 when he acquired assets in the West Siberia Region of Russia with an exploration history dating back to 1971. Shortly afterwards it bought assets in the Timan-Pechora Basin with a history dating back to 1988. It was listed on the London Stock Exchange in December 2009 but delisted in December 2020.

Russian businessman Alexey Khotin acquired a 30% stake in the company in 2013.

== Operations ==
The company owns ten oil fields at early development stages in West Siberia and Timan-Pechora.

== See also ==
- Petroleum industry in Russia
