= Loskutnaya =

Former hotel in Moscow, Russia

Coordinates: 55°45′22″N 37°36′57″E

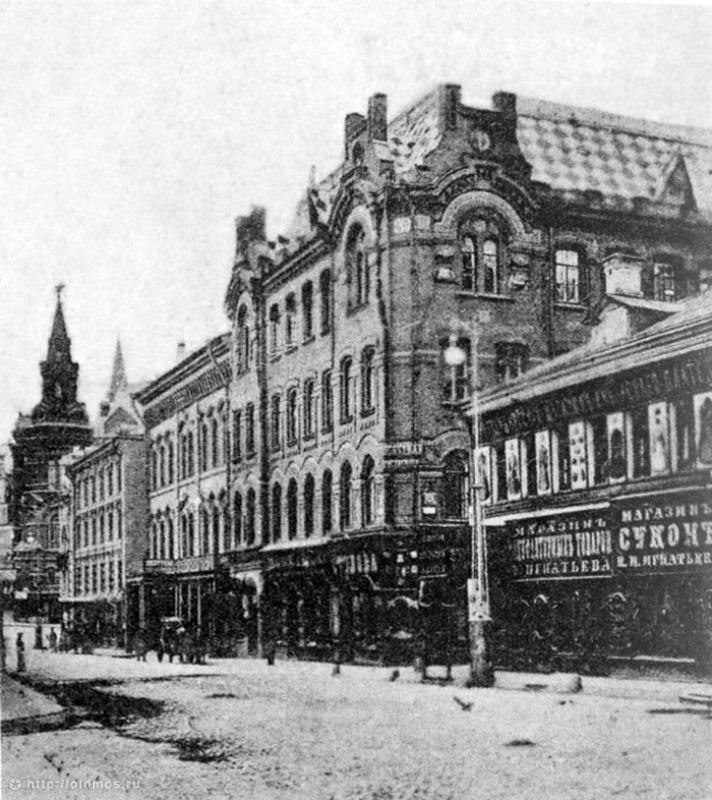
Loskutnaya

The Loskutnaya Hotel (Russian: Лоскутная) was a hotel on Tverskaya Street in Moscow. The hotel, built in the 19th century, was located by the Manege Square, near the Historical Museum and Iverskaia Gate.

Geir Kjetsaa, author of Fyodor Dostoyevsky: A Writer's Life, said that the hotel was "one of the best hotels in town." Fyodor Dostoevsky wrote many of his testament letters in the hotel, room 33. Leonid Andreev and Pyotr Boborykin often stayed at the hotel. A group of people with Anton Chekhov also stayed at Loskutnaya.

It was later renamed to the Red Fleet Hostel, and students and younger members of the Communist Party of Russia stayed at the hotel. During Communist rule, some rooms were reserved for Naval College members and sailor delegates.
