= Revolution Square, Moscow =

Square in Moscow, Russia

Revolution Square
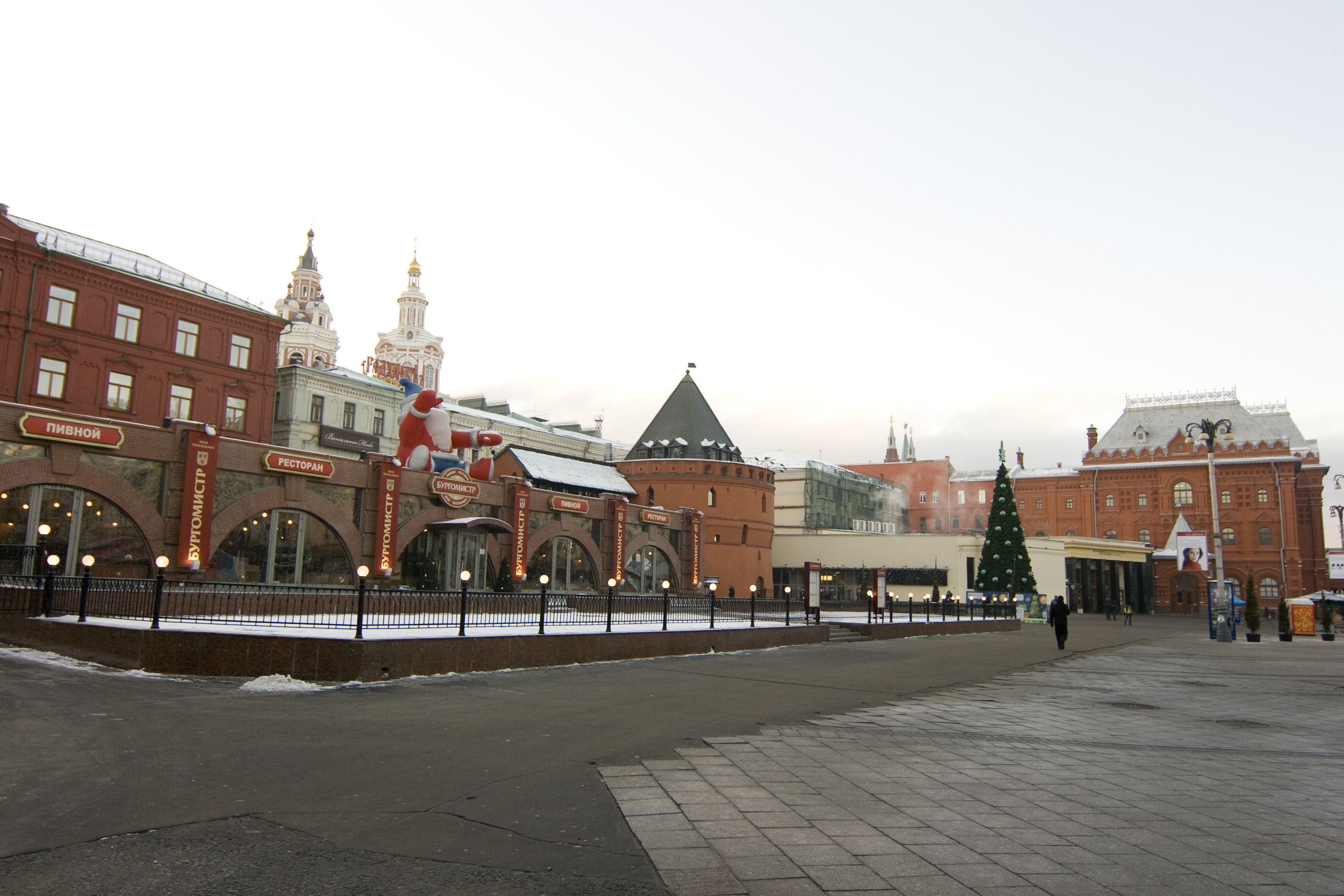
- Native name: Площадь Революции (Russian)
- Location: Moscow; Central Administrative Okrug; Tverskoy District
- Nearest metro station: Okhotny Ryad; Teatralnaya; Ploshchad Revolyutsii
- Coordinates: 55°45′27″N 37°37′11″E

Revolution Square (Russian: Площадь Революции, romanized: Ploshchad Revolyutsii), known as Resurrection Square (Russian: Воскресенская площадь, romanized: Voskresenskaya ploshchad) until 1918, is a square located in the center of Moscow, in Tverskoy District, northwest of Red Square. The square has the shape of an arc running from the southwest to the north and is bounded by Manezhnaya Square to the southwest, Okhotny Ryad to the north, and the buildings separating it from Nikolskaya Street to the south and to the east. It is one of the Central Squares of Moscow. The continuation of the Revolution Square north behind Okhotny Ryad is Teatralnaya Square.

There are three Moscow Metro stations located under the square, all of them having at least one exit at the square: Ploshchad Revolyutsii, named after the square, Teatralnaya, and Okhotny Ryad. All these stations are transfer stations, with Teatralnaya being connected with the other two.

== History ==
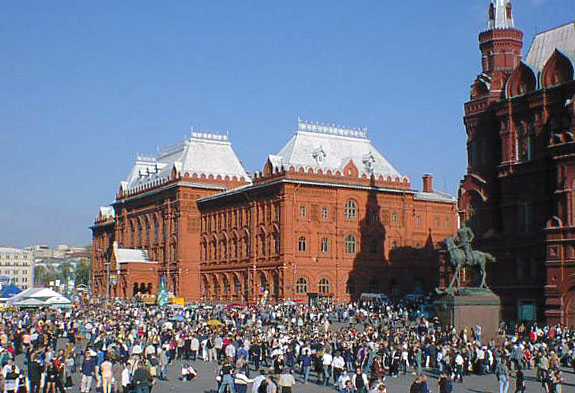
Moscow City Hall in 2000

Originally, the Neglinnaya River, a tributary of the Moskva River, currently underground, was flowing through the area. Between 1534 and 1538, the wall of Kitay-gorod with the Iberian Gate and Chapel was constructed. In 1817–1819, the Neglinnaya was rebuilt as a tunnel, and thus the area became a square. It got the name of Voskresenskaya Square (Resurrection Square), after the other name of the Iberian Gate, Resurrection Gate. In 1918, the square was renamed by the Bolsheviks in honour of the October Revolution. In 1931, the Iberian Gate was demolished by the Soviet regime despite its historic status (restored in 1994–1995 after the break-up of the USSR), and in 1935, Hotel Moskva was built on the northern side of the square, separating it from Okhotny Ryad. The road traffic was subsequently separated, so that traffic from Tverskaya Street in the direction of Lubyanka Square followed Revolution Square, and road traffic in the reverse direction followed Okhotny Ryad. In 1993, all road traffic around the Moscow Kremlin was made unidirectional (in the clockwise direction), and Revolution Square ceased to be a through road. It is now pedestrianized.

== Notable buildings ==
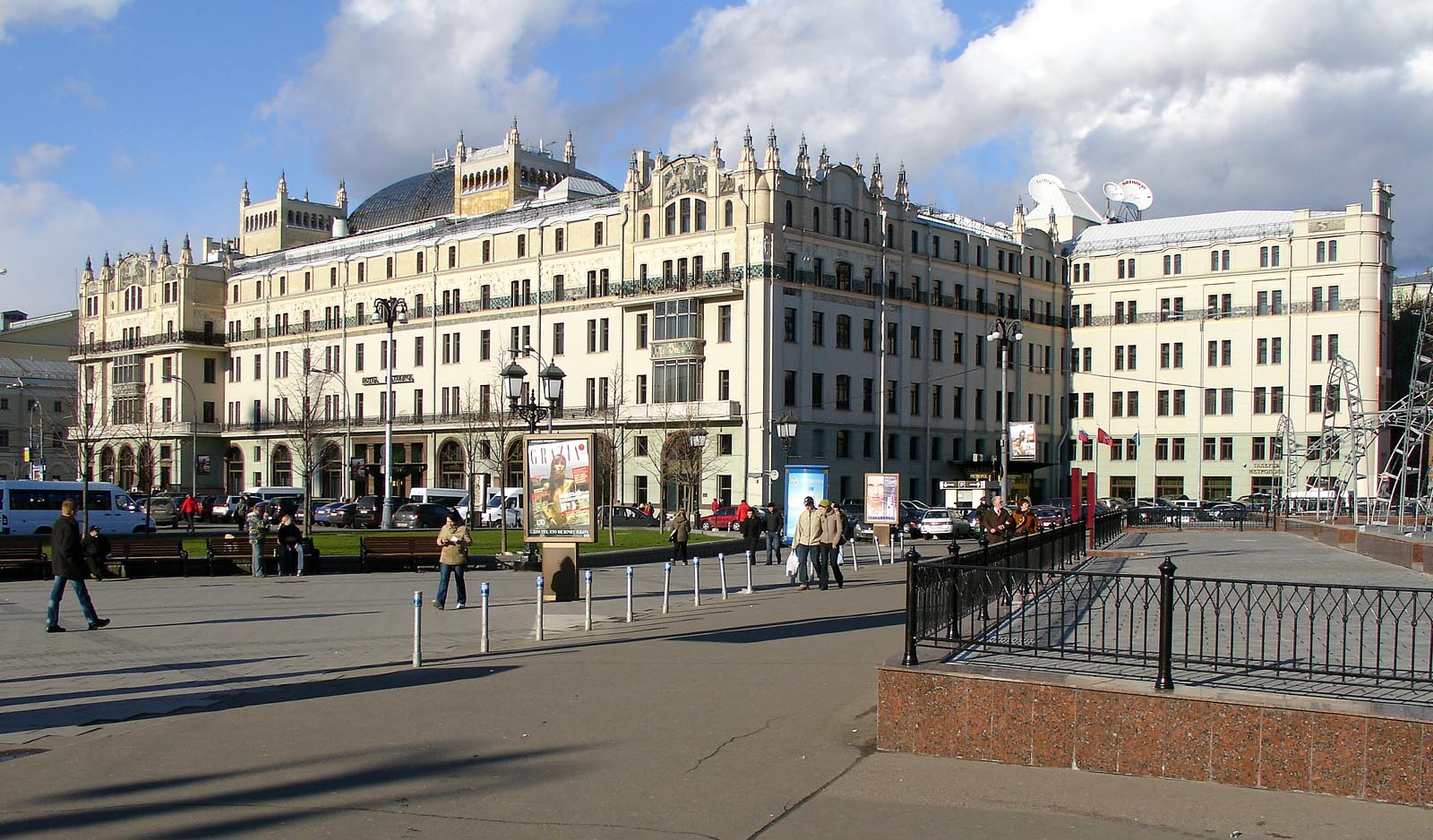
Hotel Metropol and Revolution Square.

- Hotel Metropol, located in the northwestern side of the square at the corner with Teatralny Lane, was built in 1899-1907 and is considered one of the finest Art Nouveau buildings in Moscow.
- Hotel Moskva, is located at the northern side of the square and separates it from Okhotny Ryad. It was built between 1932 and 1938 by Alexey Shchusev and rebuilt in 2014. The current building replicates the iconic facade of the original, following Shchusev's exterior plans as accurately as possible.
- The building of the Moscow City Hall, built in 1890-1892 by Dmitry Chichagov, was repurposed into a Lenin museum after the Bolshevik Revolution. It separates the Revolution Square from the Red Square.
- Resurrection Gate was built in 1535 and rebuilt in 1680. It was demolished on Joseph Stalin's orders in 1931, but, after the fall of the Soviet Union, the city restored the Resurrection Gate in 1994–1996. It connects the Revolution Square with the Red Square.
