= Revolution Square (Maribor) =

Square in Maribor, Slovenia

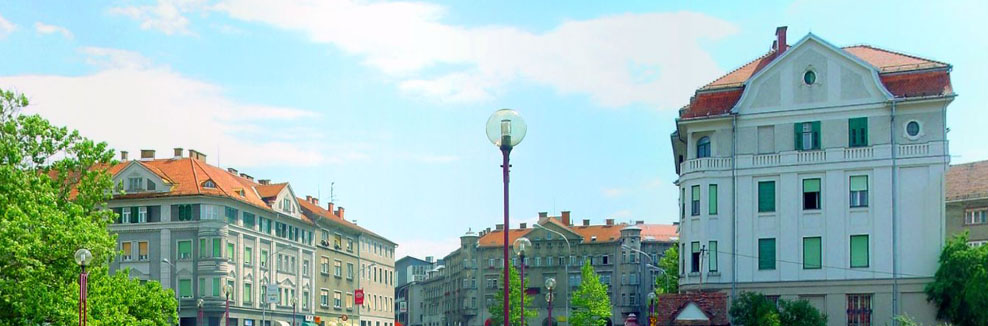
Revolution Square

Revolution Square (Slovene: Trg revolucije) is a town square in the city of Maribor in Slovenia.
