= Gorbushka =

Coordinates: 55°44′31″N 37°30′8″E

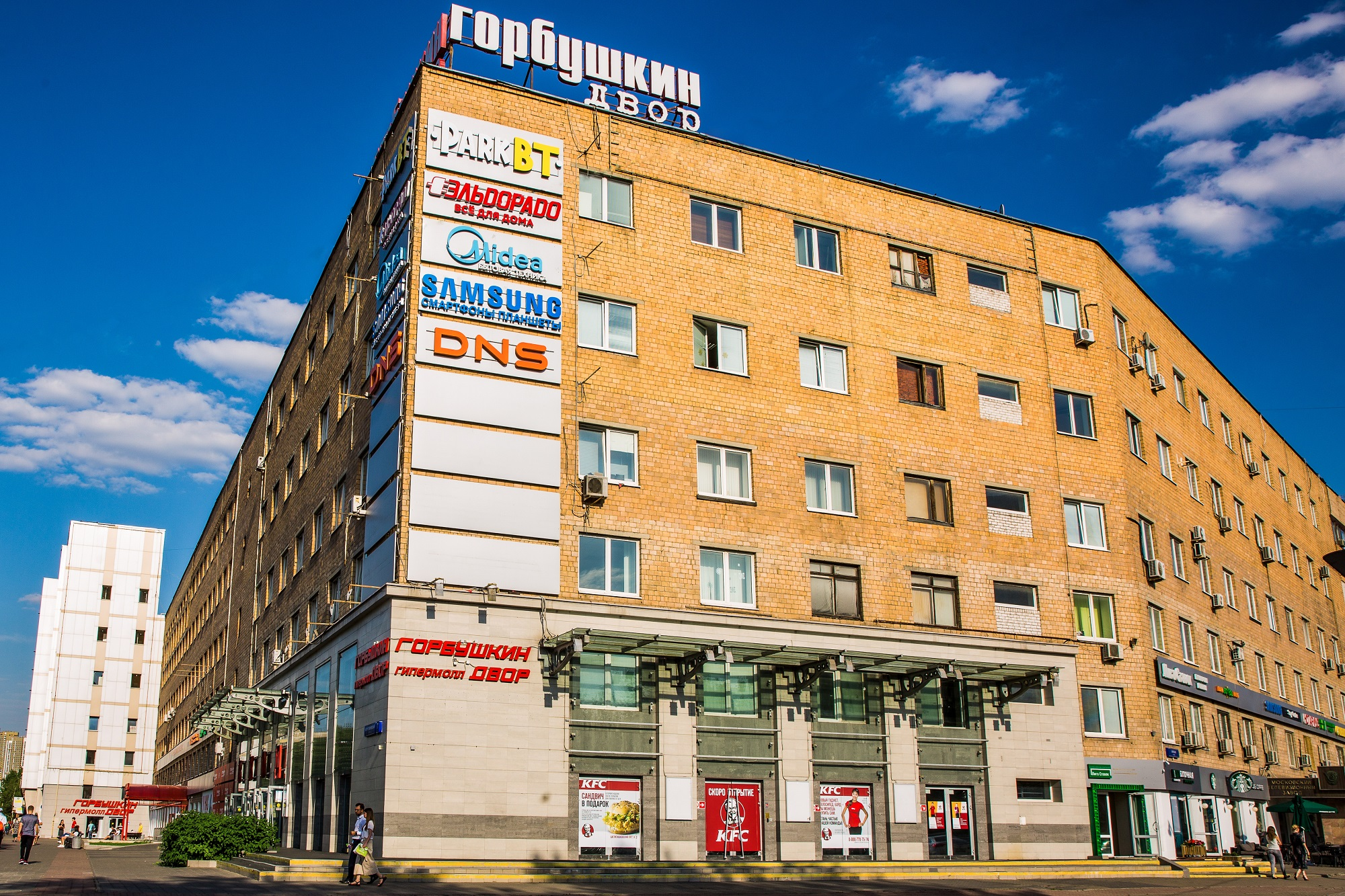
Gorbushka (September 2018)

Gorbúshka (Russian: ТЦ "Горбушка", lit. 'shopping center Gorbushka') is a marketplace for dealing in music, electronics and household equipment in Moscow, Russia.

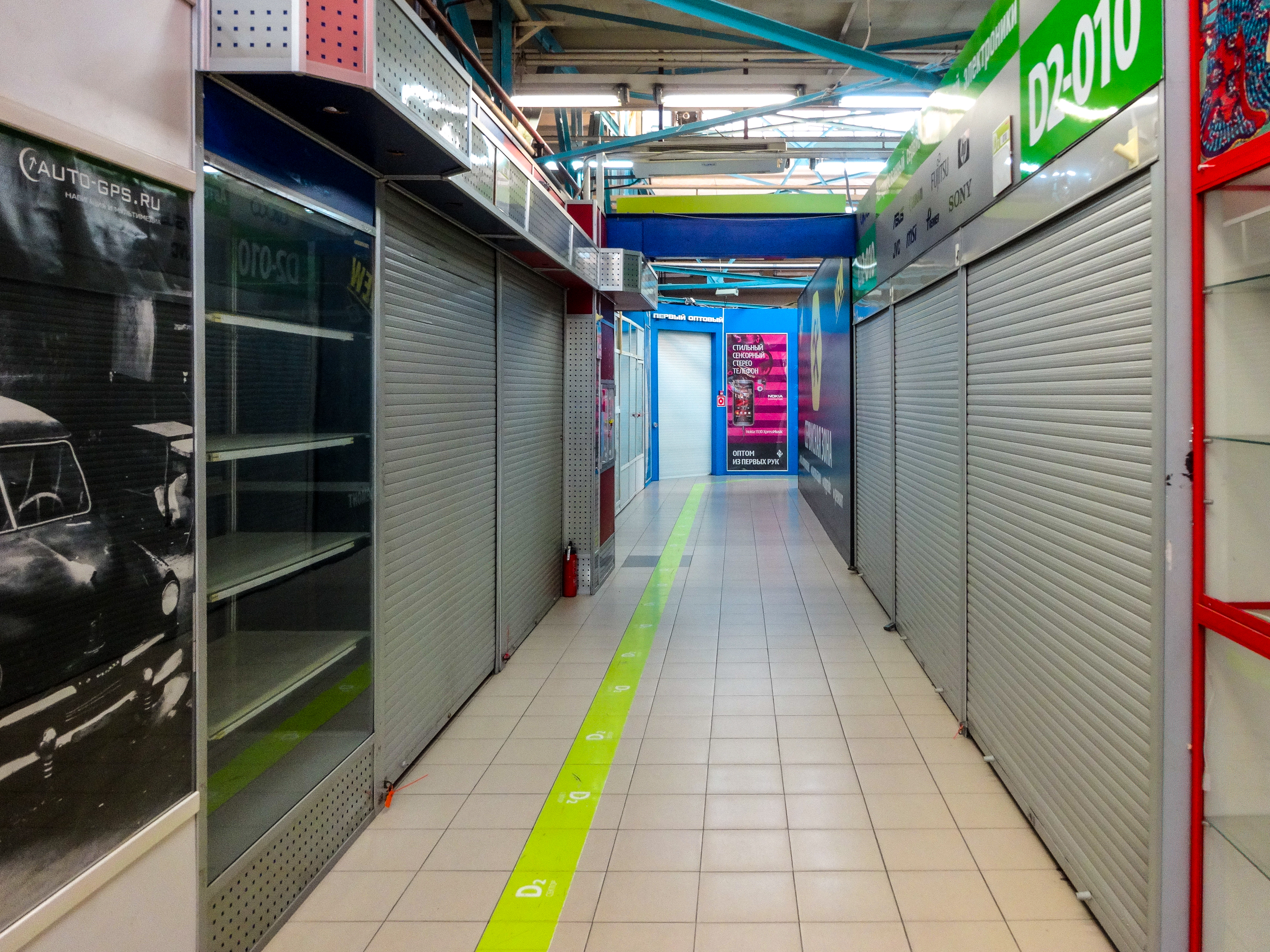
Empty trade line at Gorbushkin Dvor. July 2014

The word itself is an associative usage of an untranslatable Russian word for the first slice from a loaf of bread which contains mostly the crust. If the loaf is round, the shape resembles a hump (Russian: горб). The word has many cultural associations in Russia. Before the year 2001 the name "Gorbushka" referred to an open-air black market for software, music, videos and electronics. The market was in the city square by the Gorbunov Palace of Culture ( ДК имени Горбунова), hence the name.

The market dealt mostly in unlicensed music and software CDs, videos, gaming consoles with mod chips, as well as video games. Due to the copyright infringement issues Gorbushka was in sights of the government for a long time. The market closed in 2001.

In its place a more legal shopping center Gorbushkin dvor was opened. Alexey Khotin is reported to own the company now.
