= Smolensk =

City in Smolensk Oblast, Russia

Smolensk Смоленск
- City
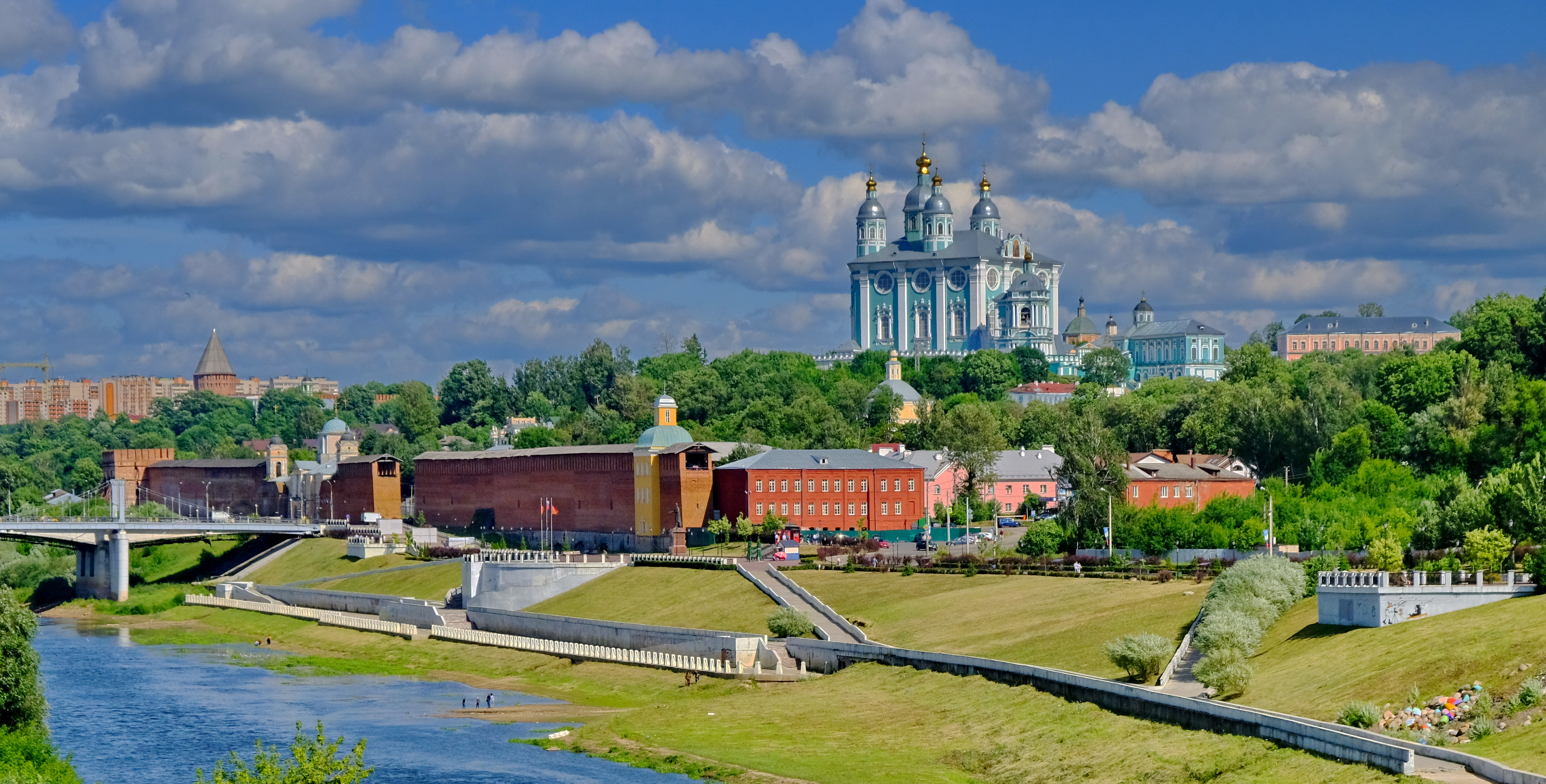
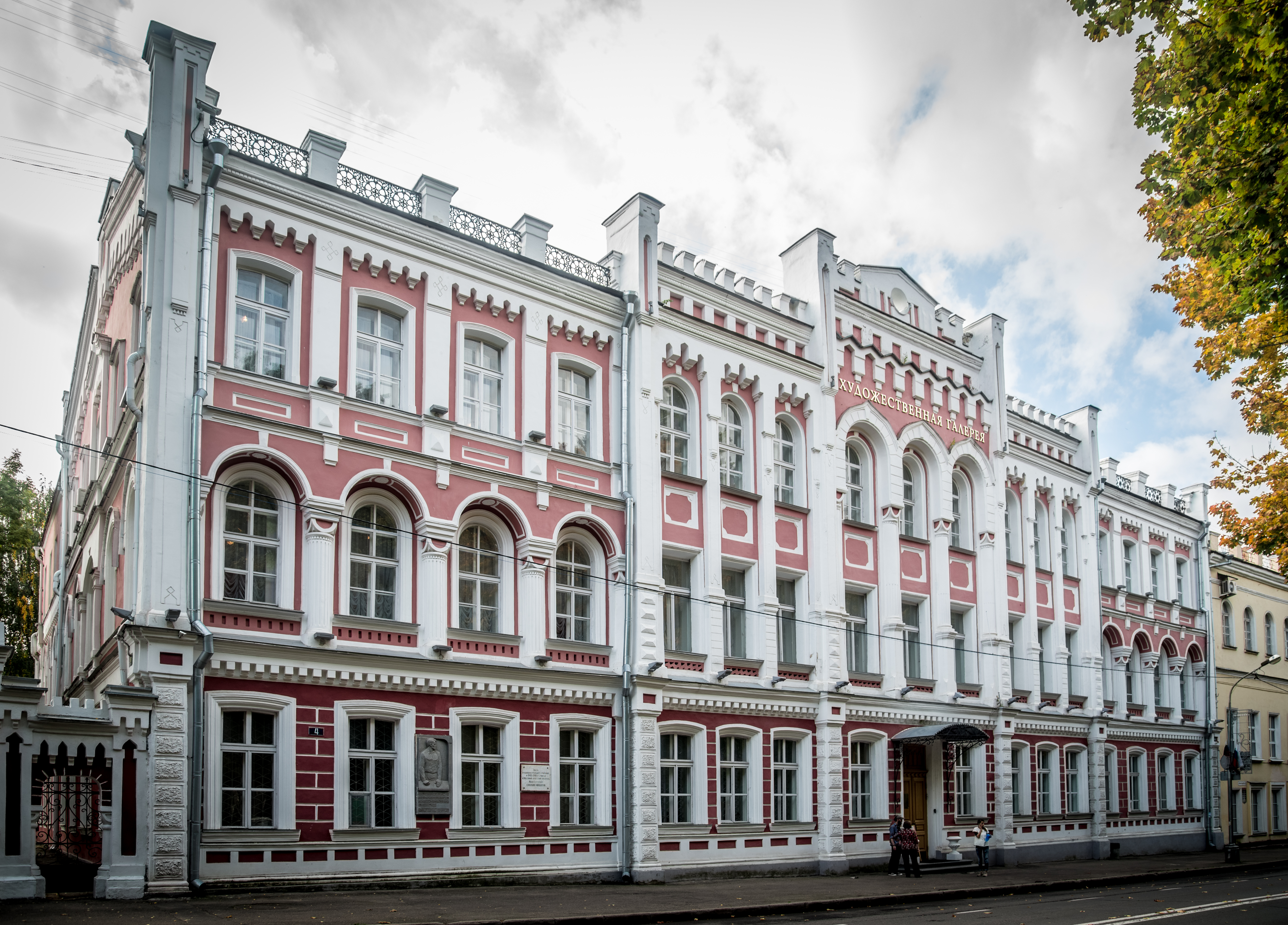
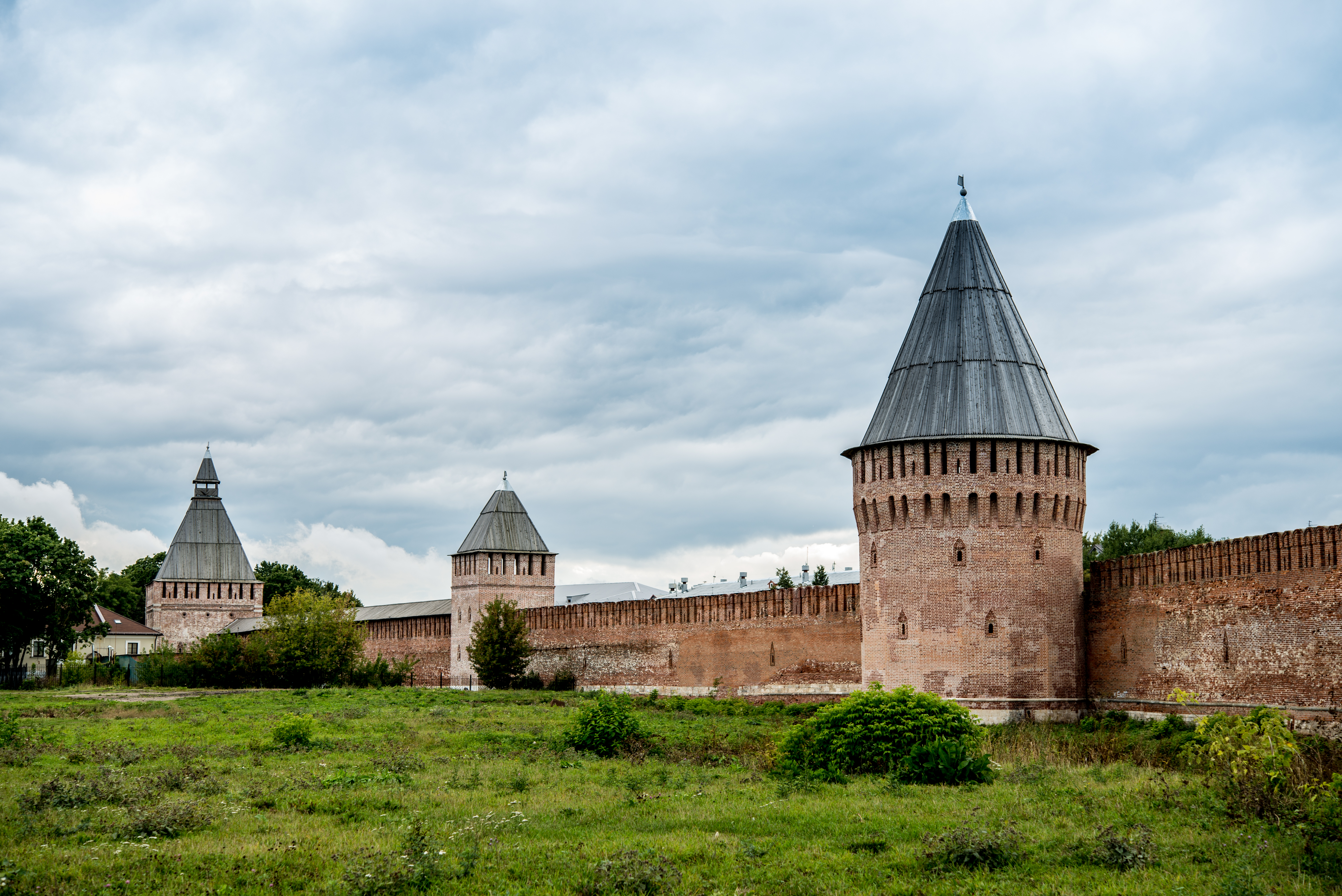
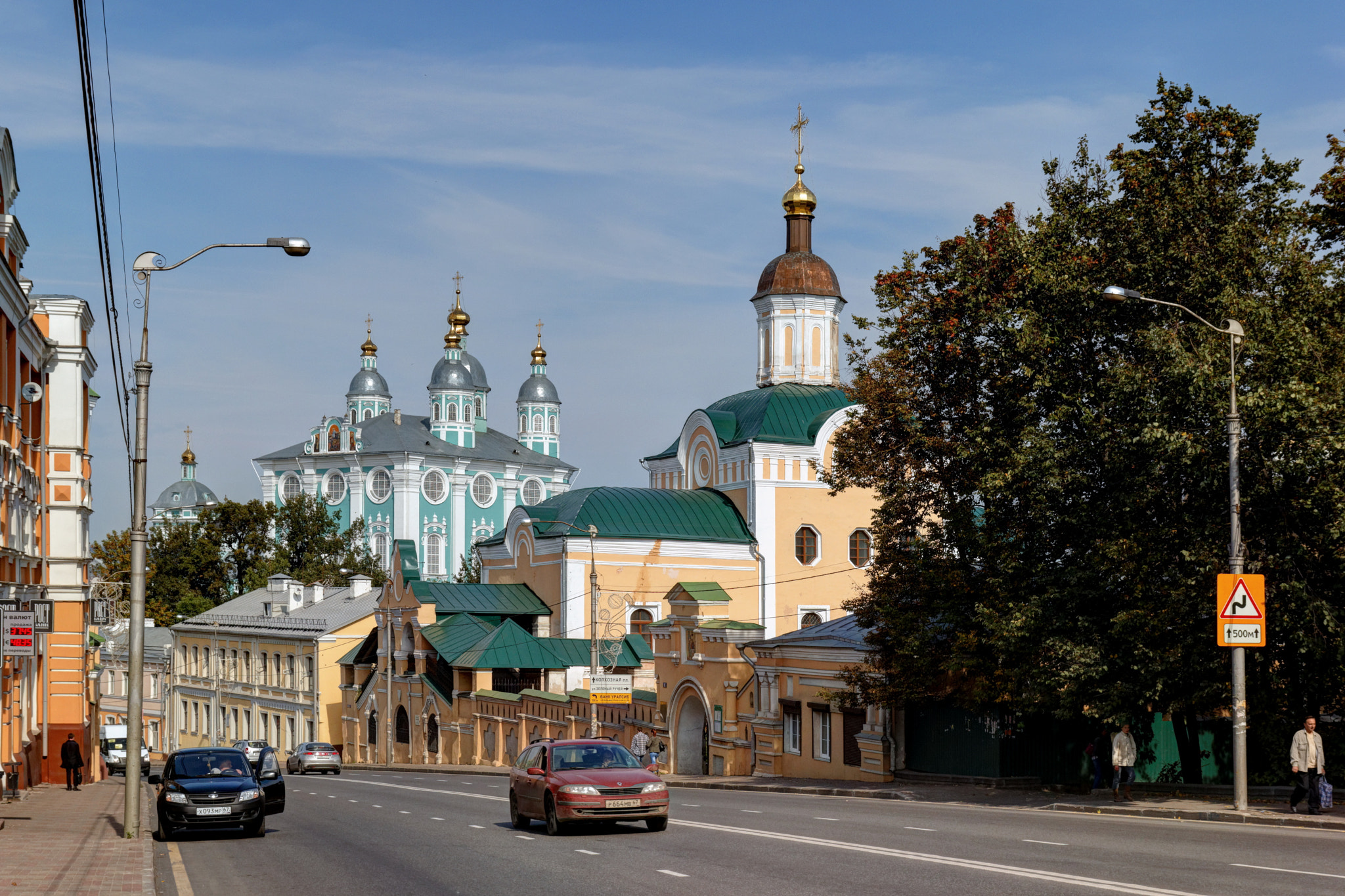
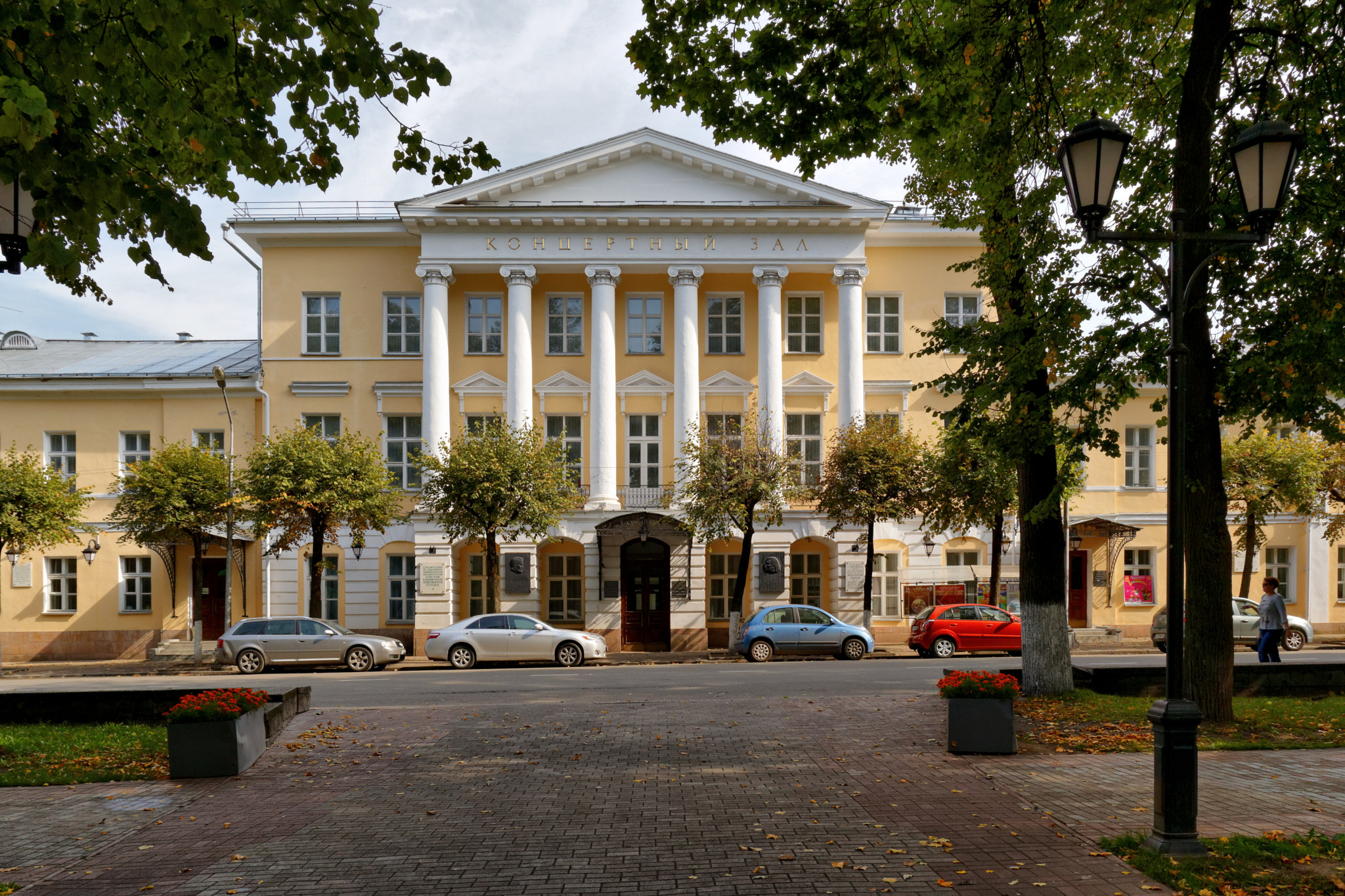
- Smolensk Kremlin and Dormition Cathedral Smolensk Art Gallery Smolensk Kremlin Holy Trinity Cathedral Philharmonic

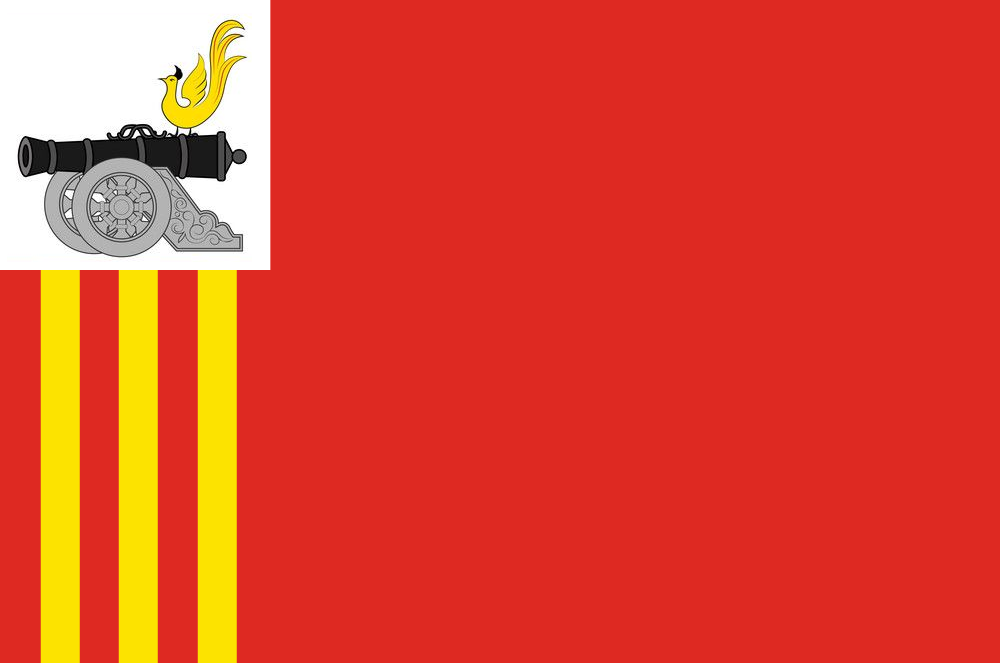
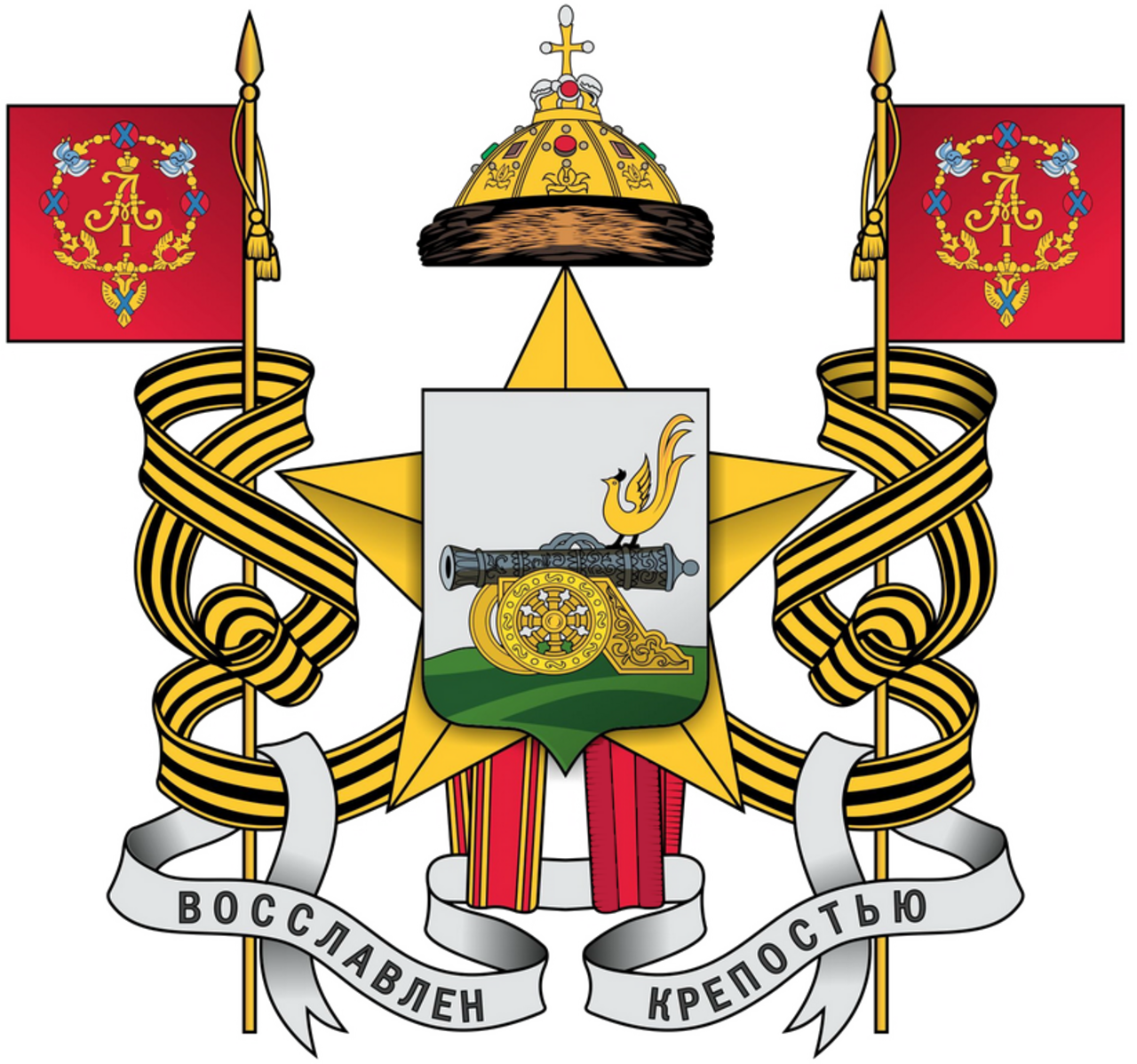
- Flag Coat of arms
- Anthem: Anthem of Smolensk
- Interactive map of Smolensk
- Location of Smolensk Smolensk (European Russia) Smolensk (Europe)
- Coordinates: 54°46′58″N 32°02′43″E
- Country: Russia
- Federal subject: Smolensk Oblast
- First mentioned: 863

Government
  - Body: City Council
  - Head: Alexander Novikov

Area
  - Total: 166.35 km^{2} (64.23 sq mi)
- Elevation: 254 m (833 ft)

Population (2021 Census)
  - Total: 316,570
  - Estimate (2025): 310,460 (−1.9%)
  - Rank: 59th in 2021
  - Density: 1,903.0/km^{2} (4,928.8/sq mi)

Administrative status
  - Subordinated to: Smolensk Urban Okrug
  - Capital of: Smolensk Oblast, Smolensky District

Municipal status
  - Urban okrug: Smolensk Urban Okrug
  - Capital of: Smolensk Urban Okrug, Smolensky Municipal District
- Time zone: UTC+3 (MSK)
- Postal code: 214ХХХ
- Dialing code: +7 4812
- OKTMO ID: 66701000001
- Website: www.smoladmin.ru

Smolensk (Note: /ˈsmɒlɛnsk/, US also /smoʊˈlɛnsk/; Russian: Смоленск, IPA: [smɐˈlʲensk]; Belarusian: Смаленск, romanized: Smalyensk; Polish: Smoleńsk IPA: [smɔ.lɛɲsk]) is a city and the administrative center of Smolensk Oblast, Russia, located on the Dnieper River, 360 kilometers (220 mi) west-southwest of Moscow. Population: 316,570 (2021 census).

First mentioned in 863, Smolensk is one of the oldest cities in Russia. During the early medieval period, Smolensk lay on the historic route from the Varangians to the Greeks. It has been a regional capital for most of the past millennium, first serving as the capital of the Principality of Smolensk, one of several dominant Russian principalities, from the 11th to the 15th centuries. It then became the capital of Smolensk Voivodeship within Lithuania before passing to Russia in 1514. Smolensk passed to the Polish–Lithuanian Commonwealth in 1611 before becoming part of Russia again in 1654, after which it became the capital of Smolensk Governorate in 1708.

In the late modern period, it was the site of two major battles, in 1812 and 1941, during the French and German invasions of Russia, respectively, as their forces advanced towards Moscow.

== Etymology ==
According to one version, the name of the city is derived from the Smolnya River. The origin of the river's name is less clear. One possibility is that it is derived from the Old Slavonic word смоль (smol') for black soil.

According to another version, it is derived from the Russian word smola (смола), meaning 'tar' or 'pitch'. Alternatively, the name may come from smolyony (смолёный), referring to the practice of tarring boats when the city was located on the route from the Varangians to the Greeks. Another possibility is that the name is derived from the Smolyans, a Slavic tribe that may have migrated from the Danube.

The Byzantine emperor Constantine VII (r. 913–959) recorded its name as Miliniska (Μιλινισκα).

== History ==
=== Medieval origins ===
Smolensk is among the oldest Russian cities. The introduction of the Primary Chronicle mentions it as the center of the Krivichi, an East Slavic tribal union, without giving a date. The 16th-century Ustyug Chronicle first mentions it under the year 863. The original site of the city has also been disputed, with some researchers believing that it was associated with Gnyozdovo, while others believe that it existed on the modern site. The earliest settlement remains, on the left bank of the Dnieper, date to the late 11th century. After Oleg the Wise conquered Kiev in 882, Smolensk became part of Kievan Rus'.

The first foreign writer to mention the city was the Byzantine Emperor Constantine Porphyrogenitus. In De Administrando Imperio (c. 950) he described Smolensk as a key station on the trade route from the Varangians to the Greeks. The Rus' people sailed from the Baltic region up the Western Dvina (Daugava) River as far as they could then they portaged their boats to the upper Dnieper. It was in Smolensk that they supposedly mended any leaks and small holes that might have appeared in their boats from being dragged on the ground and they used tar to do that, hence the city name.

The Principality of Smolensk was founded in 1054. Due to its central position in Kievan Rus', the city developed rapidly. By the end of the 12th century, the princedom was one of the strongest in Eastern Europe, so that Smolensk princes frequently controlled the Kievan throne. Numerous churches were built in the city at that time, including the church of Sts. Peter and Paul (1146, reconstructed to its presumed original appearance after World War II) and the church of St. John the Baptist (1180, also partly rebuilt). The most remarkable church in the city is called Svirskaya (1197, still standing); it was admired by contemporaries as the most beautiful structure east of Kiev.

Smolensk had its own veche since the very beginning of its history. Its power increased after the disintegration of Kievan Rus', and although it was not as strong as the veche in Novgorod, the princes had to take its opinion into consideration; several times in 12th and 13th centuries there was an open conflict between them.

=== Between Lithuania and Russia ===
Historical affiliations

Grand Duchy of Lithuania 1404–1514
Grand Principality of Moscow 1514–1547
Tsardom of Russia 1547–1611
Poland–Lithuania 1611–1656
Tsardom of Russia 1656–1721
Russian Empire 1721–1812
French occupation 1812
Russian Empire 1812–1917
Russian Republic 1917–1918
Belarusian People's Republic 1918–1919
Socialist Soviet Republic of Byelorussia 1919
Russian SFSR 1919–1922
Soviet Union 1922–1941
German occupation 1941–1943
Soviet Union 1943–1991
Russia 1991–present

Although spared by the Mongol armies in 1240, Smolensk paid tribute to the Golden Horde, gradually becoming a pawn in the long struggle between Grand Duchy of Lithuania and the Grand Principality of Moscow. The last sovereign monarch of Smolensk was Yury of Smolensk; during his reign the city was taken by Vytautas the Great of Lithuania on three occasions: in 1395, 1404, and 1408. After the city's incorporation into the Grand Duchy of Lithuania, some of Smolensk's boyars (e.g., the Sapiehas) moved to Vilnius; descendants of the ruling princes (e.g., the Tatishchevs, Kropotkins, Mussorgskys, Vyazemskys) fled to Moscow.

Three Lithuanian Smolensk regiments took part in the 1410 Battle of Grunwald against the Teutonic Knights. It was a severe blow to Lithuania when the city was taken by Vasily III of Russia in 1514. To commemorate this event, the Tsar founded the Novodevichy Convent in Moscow and dedicated it to the icon of Our Lady of Smolensk. The loss of Smolensk to Moscow was the inspiration for Stańczyk, one of the most famous paintings by Polish painter Jan Matejko.

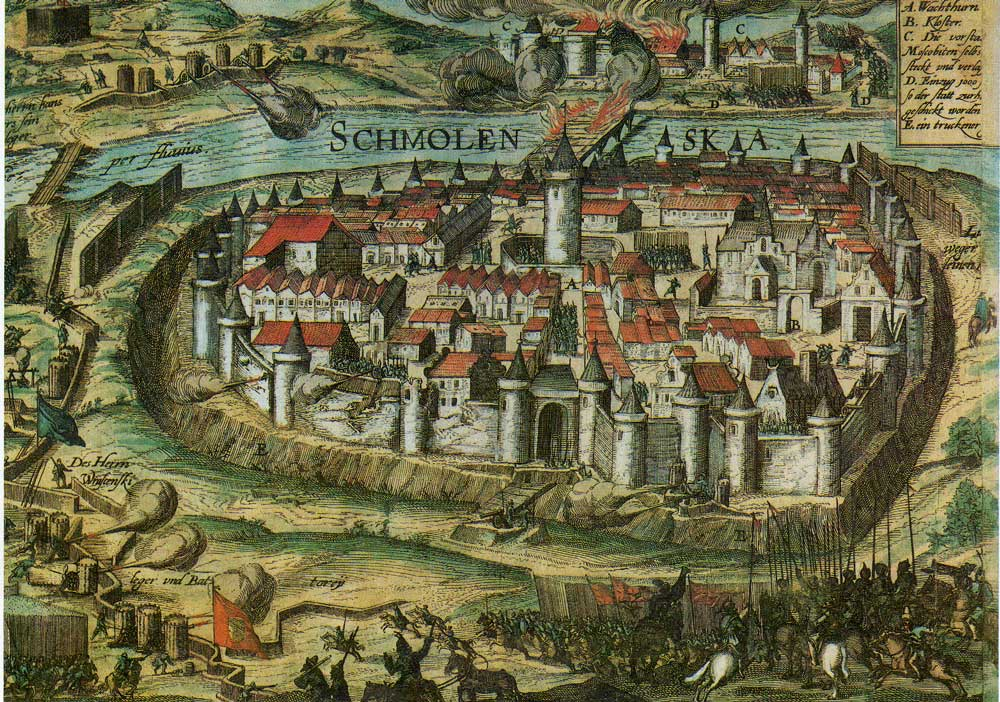
Siege of Smolensk (1609–1611) by Polish–Lithuanian Commonwealth

In order to repel future Polish–Lithuanian attacks, Boris Godunov made it his priority to heavily fortify the city. The stone kremlin constructed in 1597–1602 is the largest in Russia. It features thick walls and numerous watchtowers. Heavy fortifications did not prevent the fortress from being taken by the Polish–Lithuanian Commonwealth in 1611 after a long twenty-month siege, during the Time of Troubles and Dimitriads. Weakened Muscovy temporarily ceded Smolensk land to the Polish–Lithuanian Commonwealth in the Truce of Deulino. The city was granted Magdeburg rights in 1611 and was the seat of Smolensk Voivodeship for the next forty-three years.

To recapture the city, the Tsardom of Russia launched the so-called "Smolensk War" against the Commonwealth in 1632. After a defeat at the hands of king Wladislaw IV, the city remained in Polish–Lithuanian hands. In 1632, the Uniate bishop Lew Kreuza built his apartments in Smolensk; they were later converted into the Eastern Orthodox Church of Saint Barbara. The hostilities resumed in 1654 when the Commonwealth was being affected by the Khmelnytsky Uprising and the Swedish deluge. After another siege, on 23 September 1654, Smolensk was recaptured by Russia. In the 1667 Truce of Andrusovo, the Polish–Lithuanian Commonwealth renounced its claims to Smolensk.

=== Modern history ===
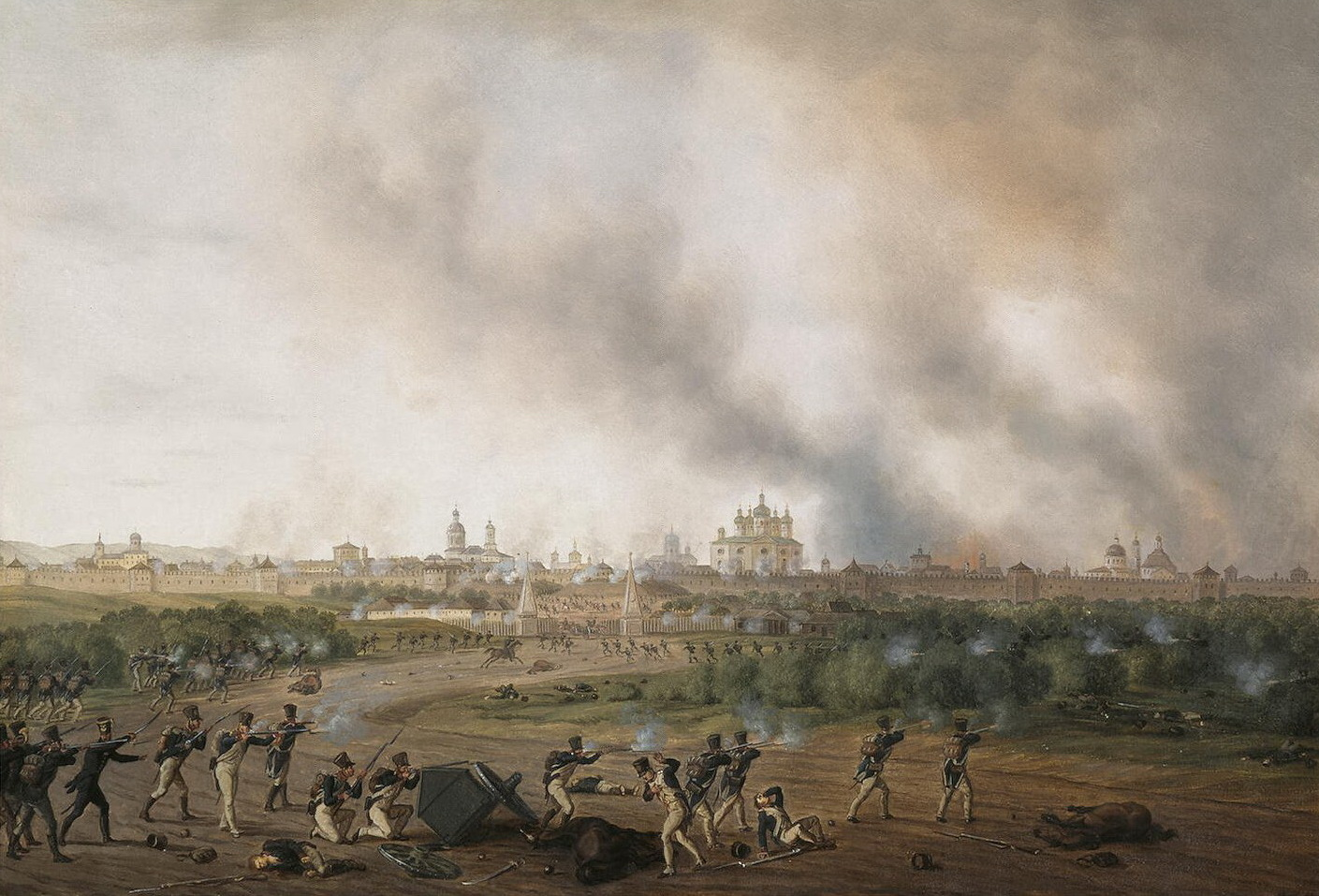
French and Polish soldiers assault the burning city of Smolensk, 1812.

Smolensk has been a special place to Russians for many reasons, not least for the fact that the local cathedral housed one of the most venerated Orthodox icons, attributed to St. Luke. Building the new Cathedral of the Assumption was a great project which took more than a century to complete. Despite slowly sinking into an economic backwater, Smolensk was still valued by the Tsars as a key fortress defending the route to Moscow. It was made the seat of Smolensk Governorate in 1708.

In August 1812, two of the largest armies ever assembled clashed in Smolensk. During the hard-fought battle, described by Leo Tolstoy in War and Peace (Book Three Part Two Chapter 4), Napoleon entered the city. Total losses were estimated at 30,000 men. Apart from other military monuments, central Smolensk features the Eagles monument, unveiled in 1912 to mark the centenary of Napoleon's Russian campaign.

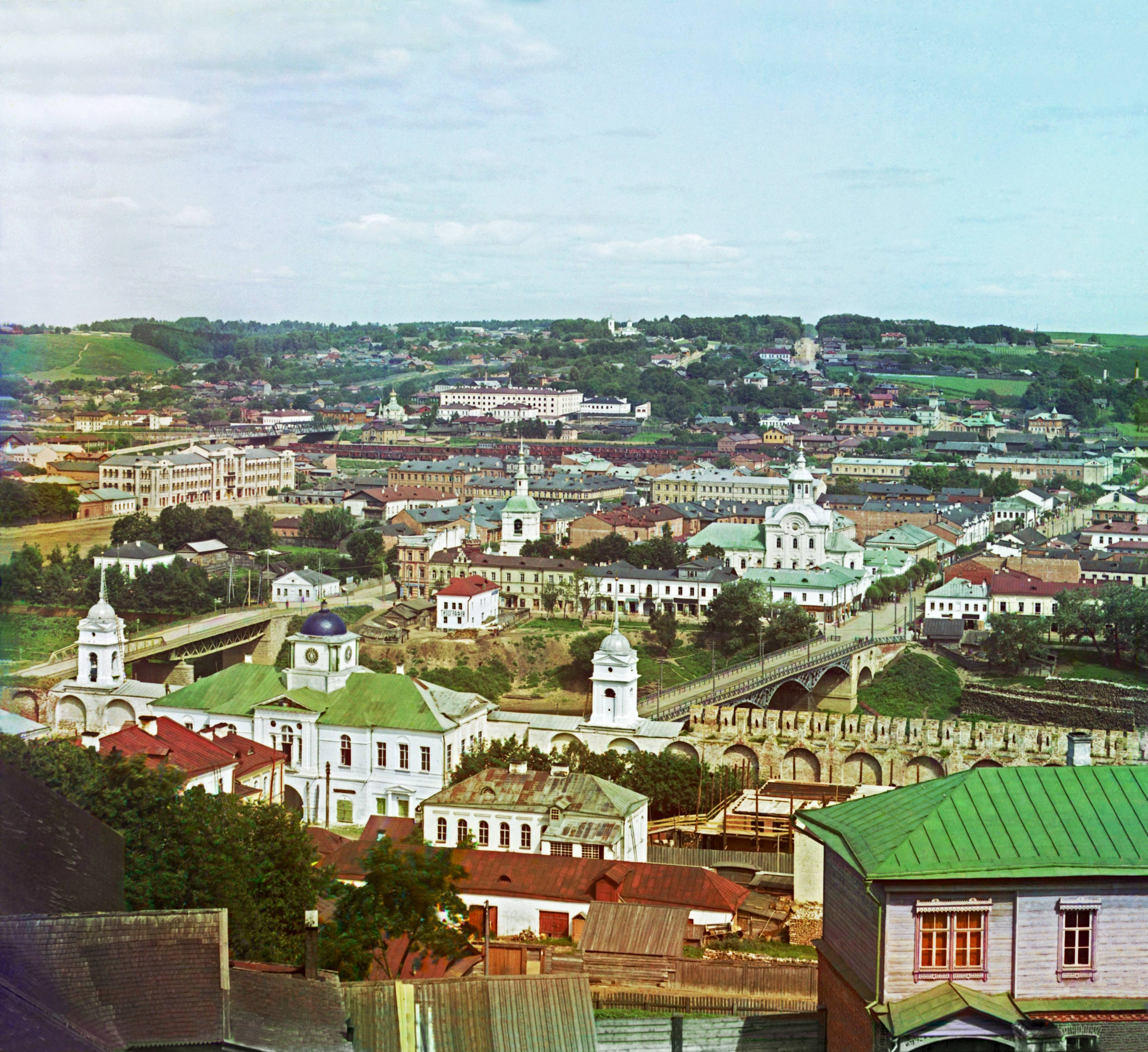
View of Smolensk in 1912. Early colour photograph by Sergei Prokudin-Gorskii

At the beginning of World War I, the 56th Smolensk Infantry Division was first assigned to the First Army of the Imperial Russian Army. They fought at the Battle of Tannenberg. It was subsequently transferred to the 10th Army and fought at the Second Battle of the Masurian Lakes. In March 1918, the Belarusian People's Republic, proclaimed in Minsk under the German occupation, declared Smolensk part of it. In February–December 1918, Smolensk was home to the headquarters of the Western Front, North-West Oblast Bolshevik Committee and Western Oblast Executive Committee. On 1 January 1919, the Byelorussian Soviet Socialist Republic was proclaimed in Smolensk, but its government moved to Minsk as soon as the German forces had been driven out of the city several days later.

=== Soviet period ===
In 1940, 18 km (11 mi) from Smolensk, the Katyn Massacre occurred, in which some 22,000 Polish POWs were murdered by the NKVD. At this time Boris Menshagin was mayor of Smolensk, with his deputy Boris Bazilevsky. Both of them would be key witnesses in the Nuremberg Trials over the massacre.

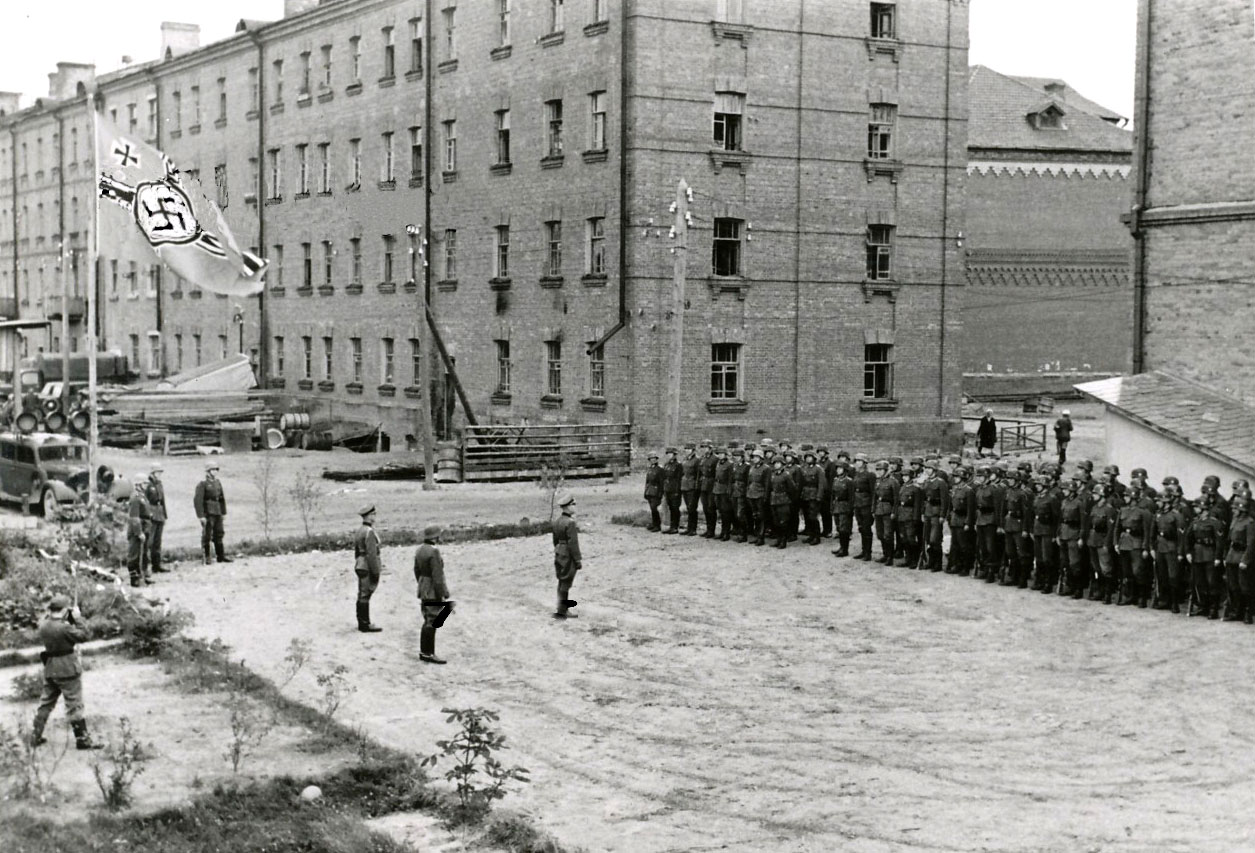
Smolensk under German occupation, 1941.

During World War II, Smolensk once again saw wide-scale fighting during the first Battle of Smolensk when the city was captured by the Germans on 16 July 1941. The first Soviet counteroffensive against the German army was launched in August but failed. However, the limited Soviet victories outside the city halted the German advance for a crucial two months, granting time to Moscow's defenders to prepare in earnest. Over 93% of the city was destroyed during the fighting; the ancient icon of Our Lady of Smolensk was lost. Nevertheless, it escaped total destruction. In late 1943, Hermann Göring had ordered Gotthard Heinrici to destroy Smolensk in accordance with the Nazi "scorched earth" policy. He refused and was punished for it. The city was finally liberated on 25 September 1943, during the second Battle of Smolensk. The rare title of Hero City was bestowed on Smolensk after the war.

When the Germans captured the city, they found the intact archives of the Smolensk Oblast Committee of the Communist Party, the so-called Smolensk Archive. The archive was moved to Nazi Germany, and a significant part of it eventually ended up in the United States, providing Western scholars and intelligence specialists with unique information during the Cold War on the local workings of the Soviet government during its first two decades. The archives were returned to Russia by the United States in 2002.

=== Recent events ===
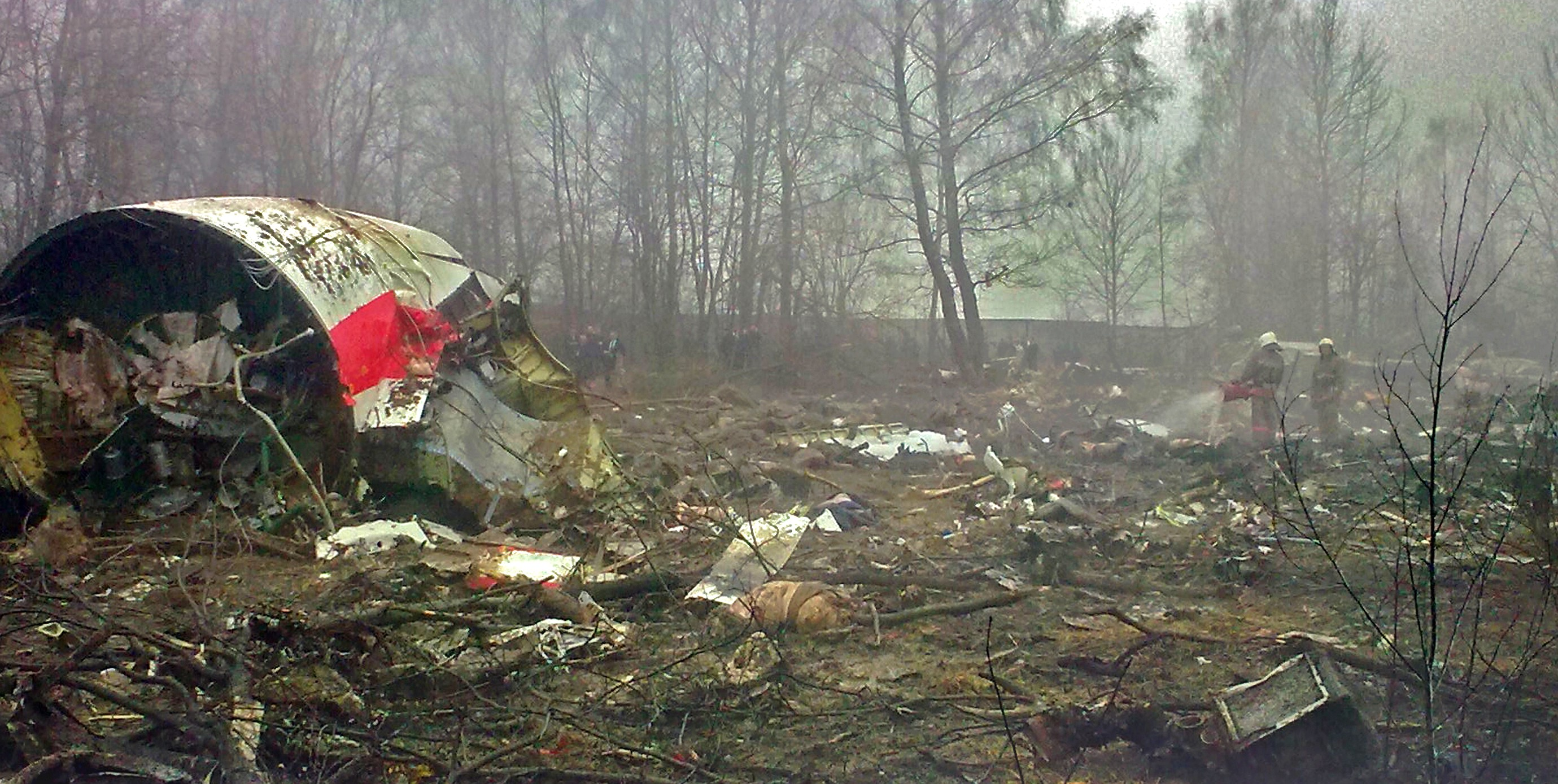
Wreckage from the Polish Tu-154 shortly after the Smolensk air disaster, 2010

On 10 April 2010, a Tu-154 military jet carrying Polish president Lech Kaczyński, his wife, and many notable political and military figures crashed in a wooded area near Smolensk while approaching the local military airport. All ninety-six passengers died immediately on impact. The purpose of the visit was to commemorate the 70th anniversary of the Katyn massacre.

In June 2013, archaeologists of the Russian Academy of Sciences discovered and unearthed ancient temples in Smolensk dated to the middle to second half of the 12th century, built on the left bank of the Dnieper River. At the time the city was the capital of Smolensk principality.

In September 2013, Smolensk widely celebrated its 1,150th anniversary with funds spent on different construction and renovation projects in the city. In celebration the Central Bank of Russia issued commemorative coins made of precious metals.

== Geography ==
The city is located in European Russia on the banks of the upper Dnieper River, which crosses the city within the Smolensk Upland, which is the western part of the Smolensk–Moscow Upland. The Dnieper River flows through the city from east to west and divides it into two parts: the northern (Zadneprove) and southern (center). Within the city and its surroundings the river takes in several small tributaries.

The old part of the city occupies the high, rugged left (south) bank of the Dnieper River. The area features undulating terrain, with a large number of tributaries, creeks and ravines.

== Demographics ==
Historical population

Year	Pop.	±%
1897	47,000	—
1926	73,520	+56.4%
1939	156,884	+113.4%
1959	147,196	−6.2%
1970	210,779	+43.2%

Year	Pop.	±%
1979	276,402	+31.1%
1989	341,483	+23.5%
2002	325,137	−4.8%
2010	326,861	+0.5%
2021	316,570	−3.1%

Source: Census data

== Attractions ==
Owing to its long and rich history, Smolensk is home to many examples of Russian architecture ranging from the Kievan Rus period to post-WWII Stalinist style. Although the city was destroyed several times over, many historically and culturally significant buildings remain, including a large number of churches and cathedrals. The most famous of these are the Cathedral of the Assumption, the Immaculate Conception Church, and the Church of St. Michael the Archangel, which is one of the few structures from before the Mongol invasion remaining in Russia.

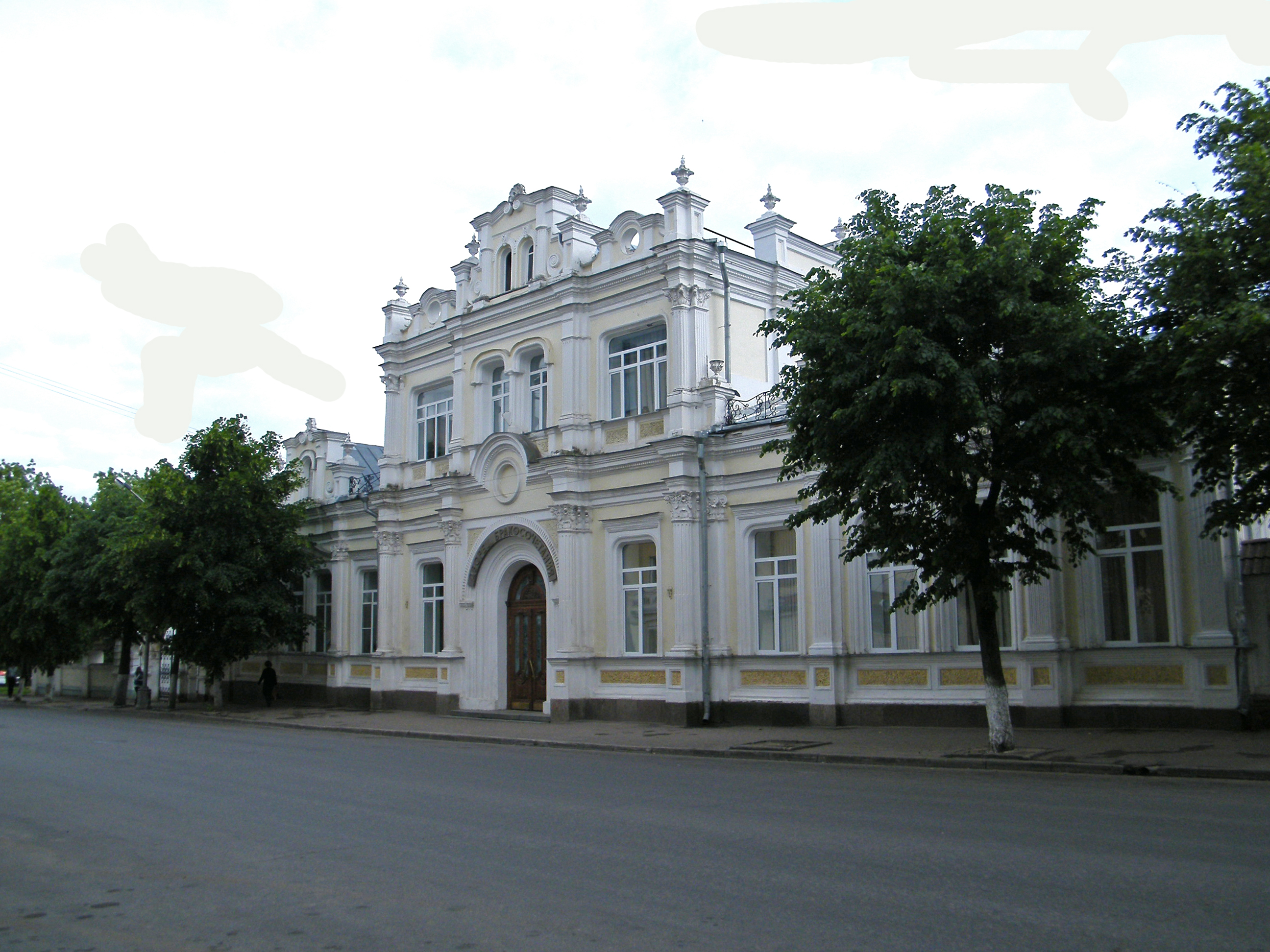
House Engelhardt

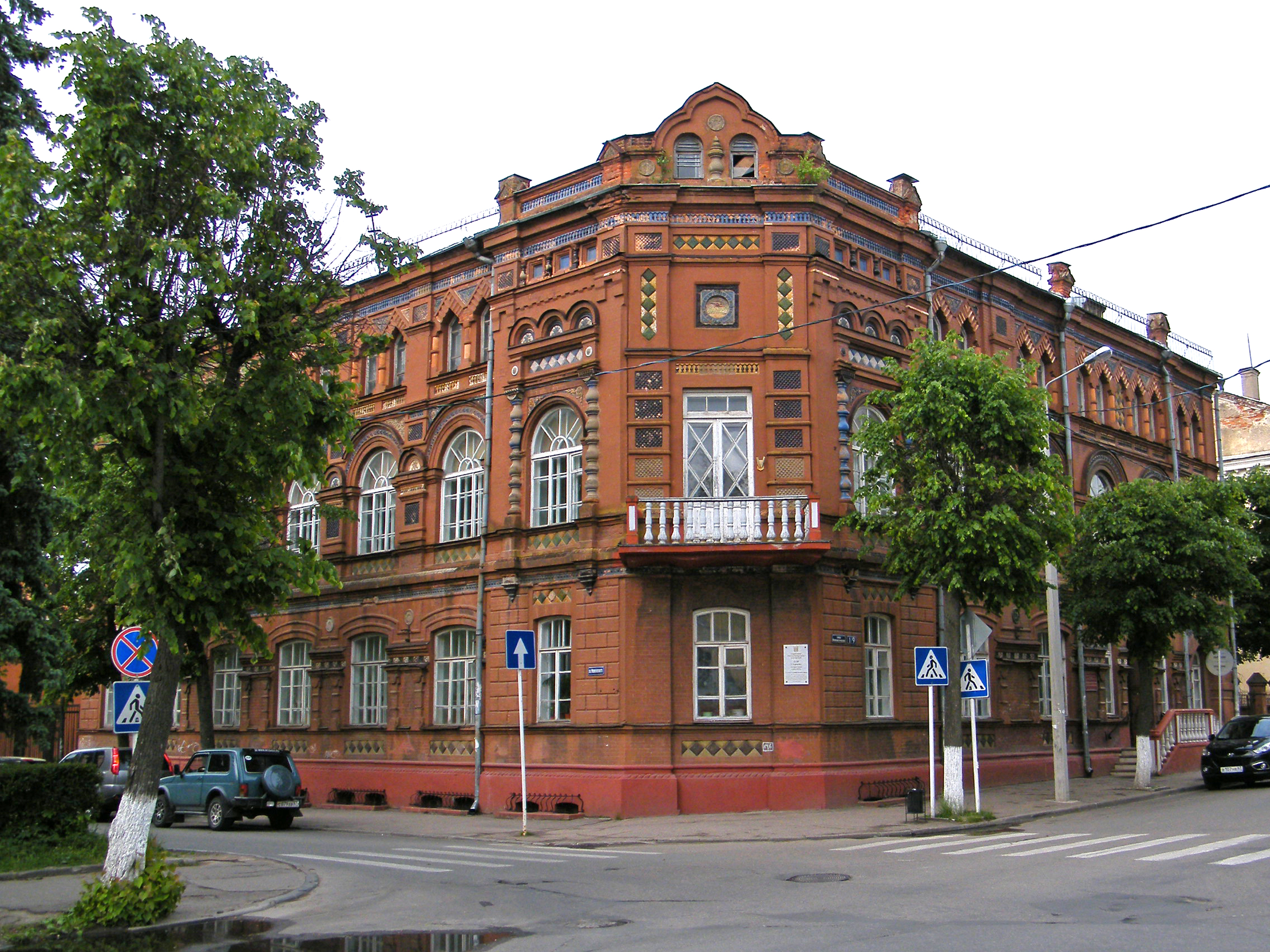
House Budnikova

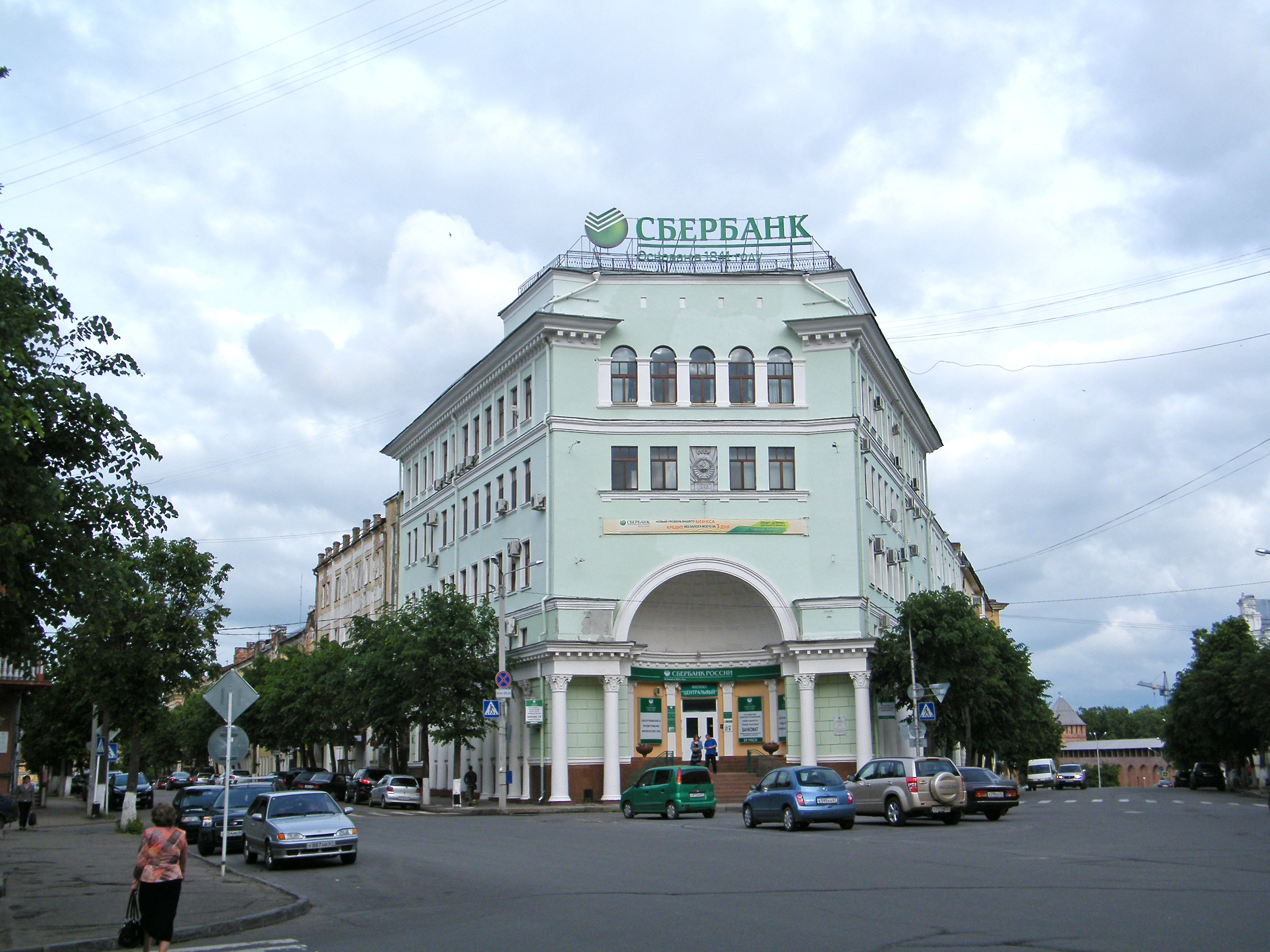
Sberbank Building

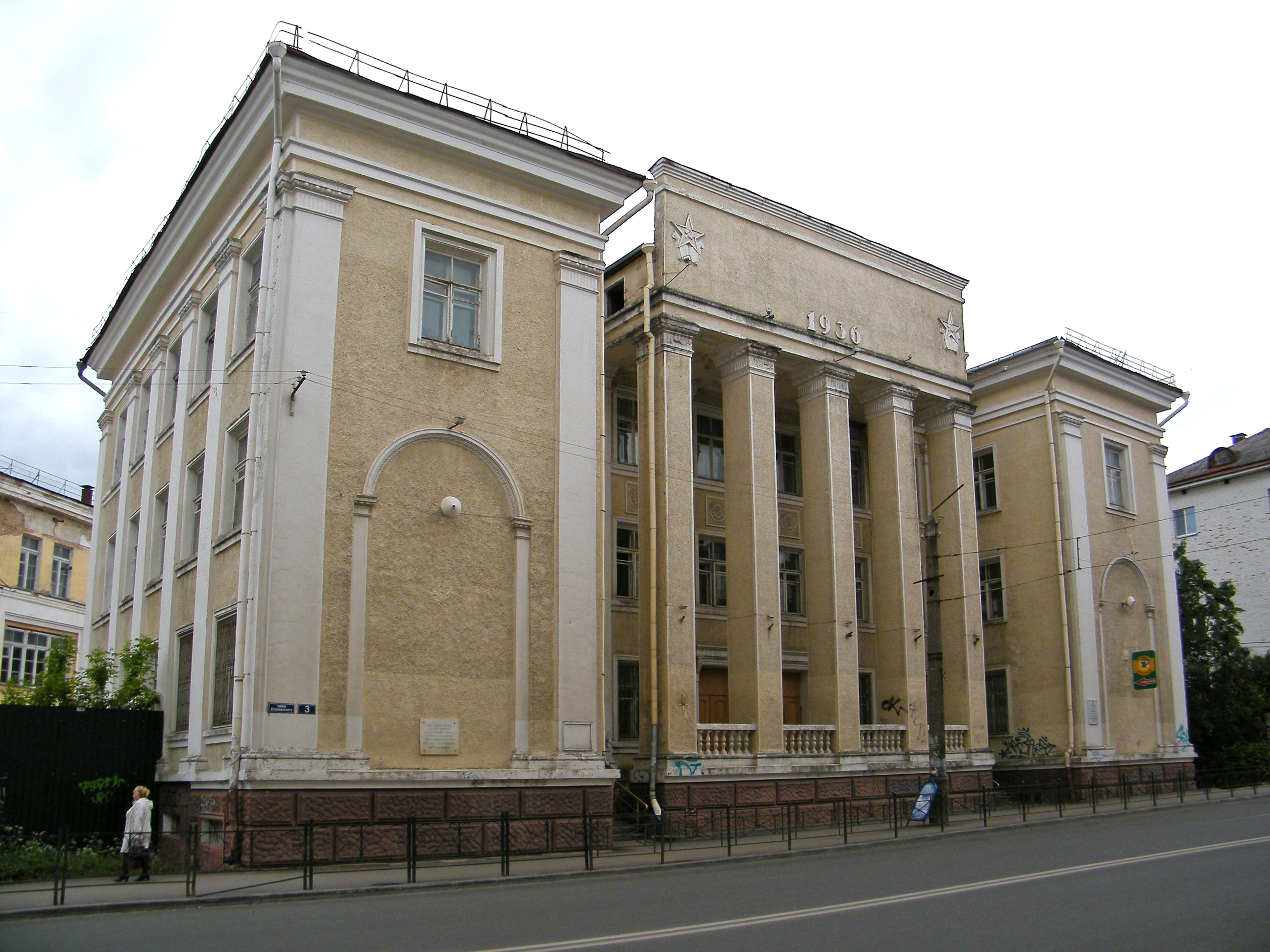
Editorial office of the newspaper Krasnoarmeyskaya Pravda

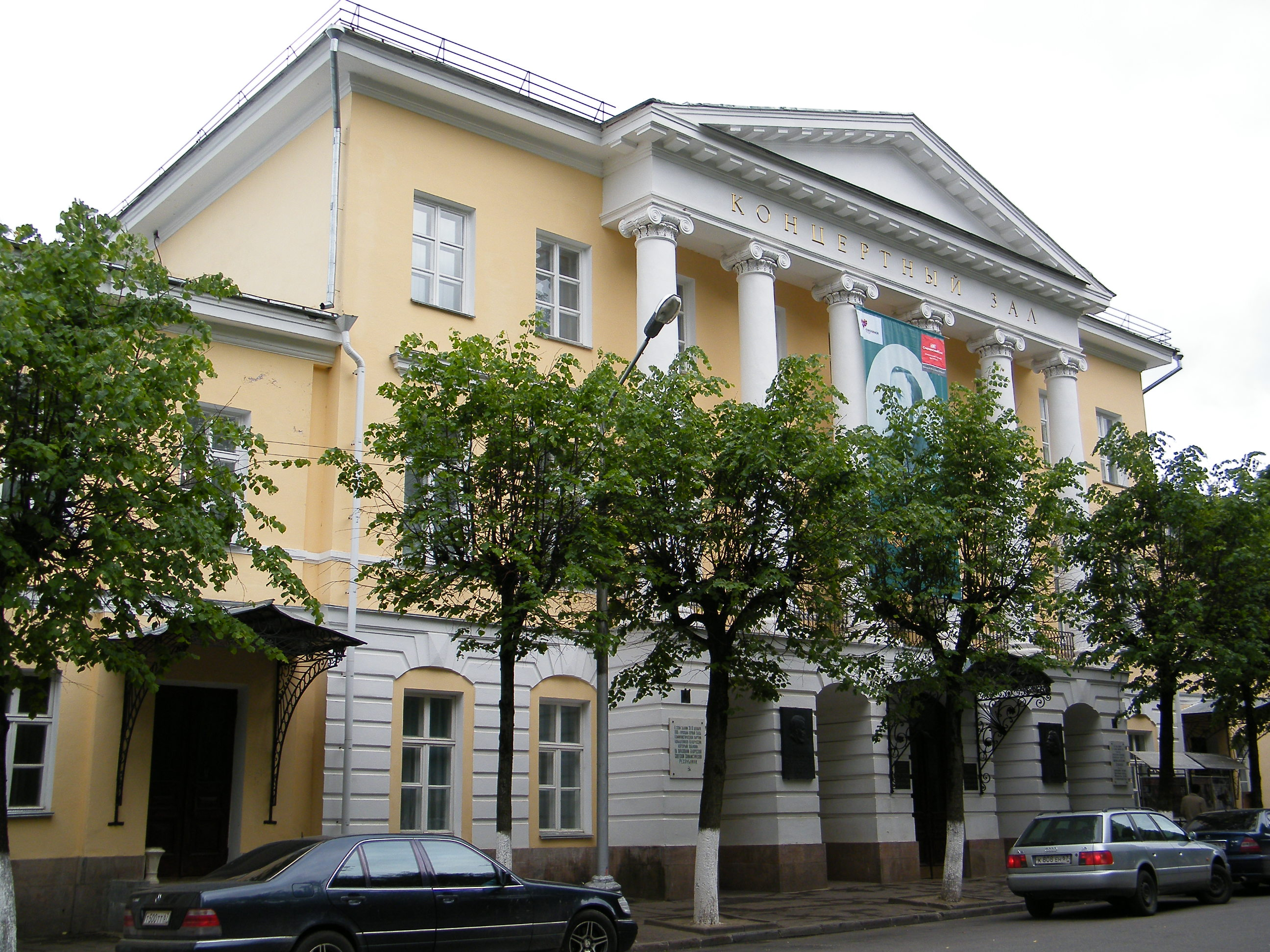
Smolensk Philharmonic Concert Hall

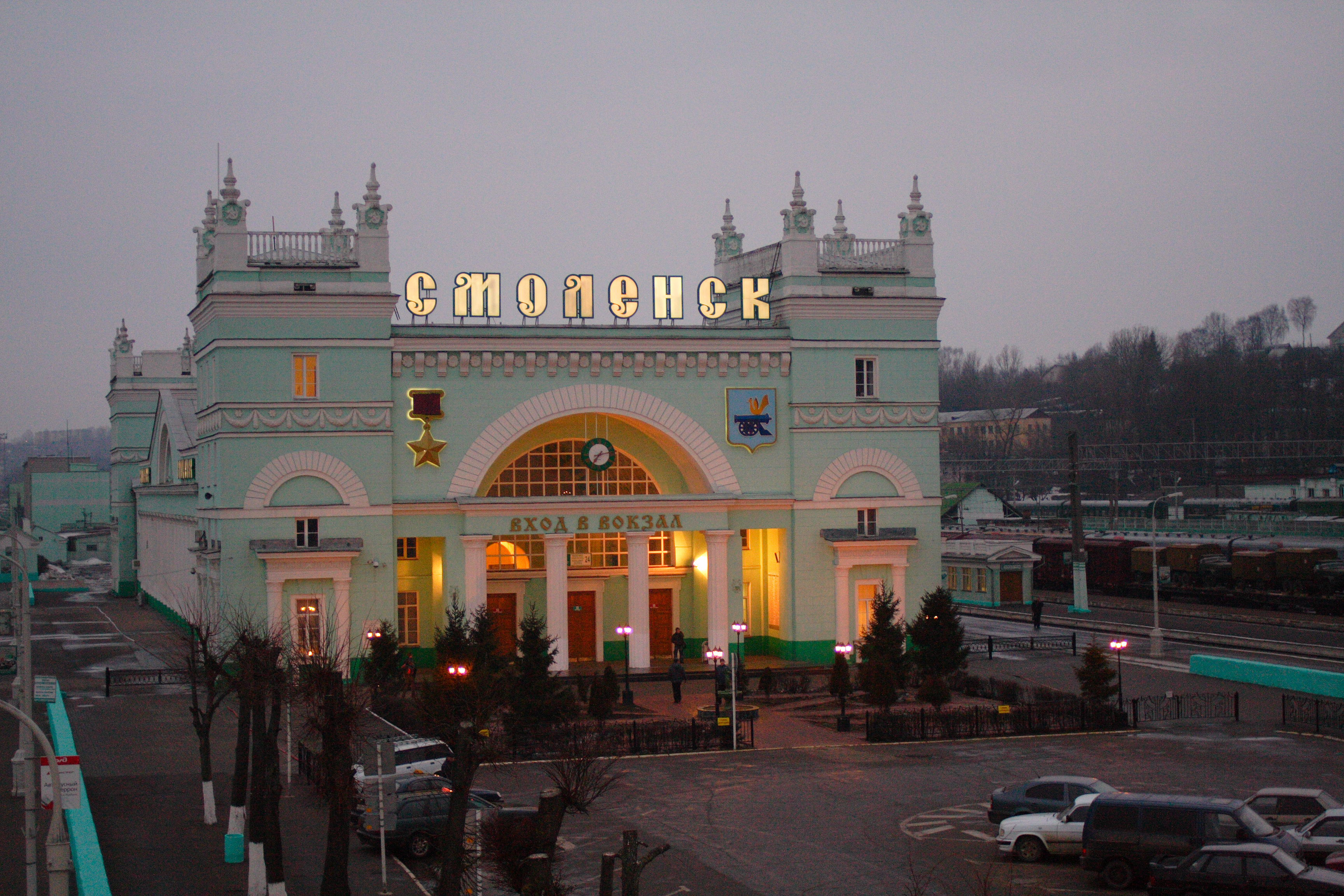
Smolensk railway station

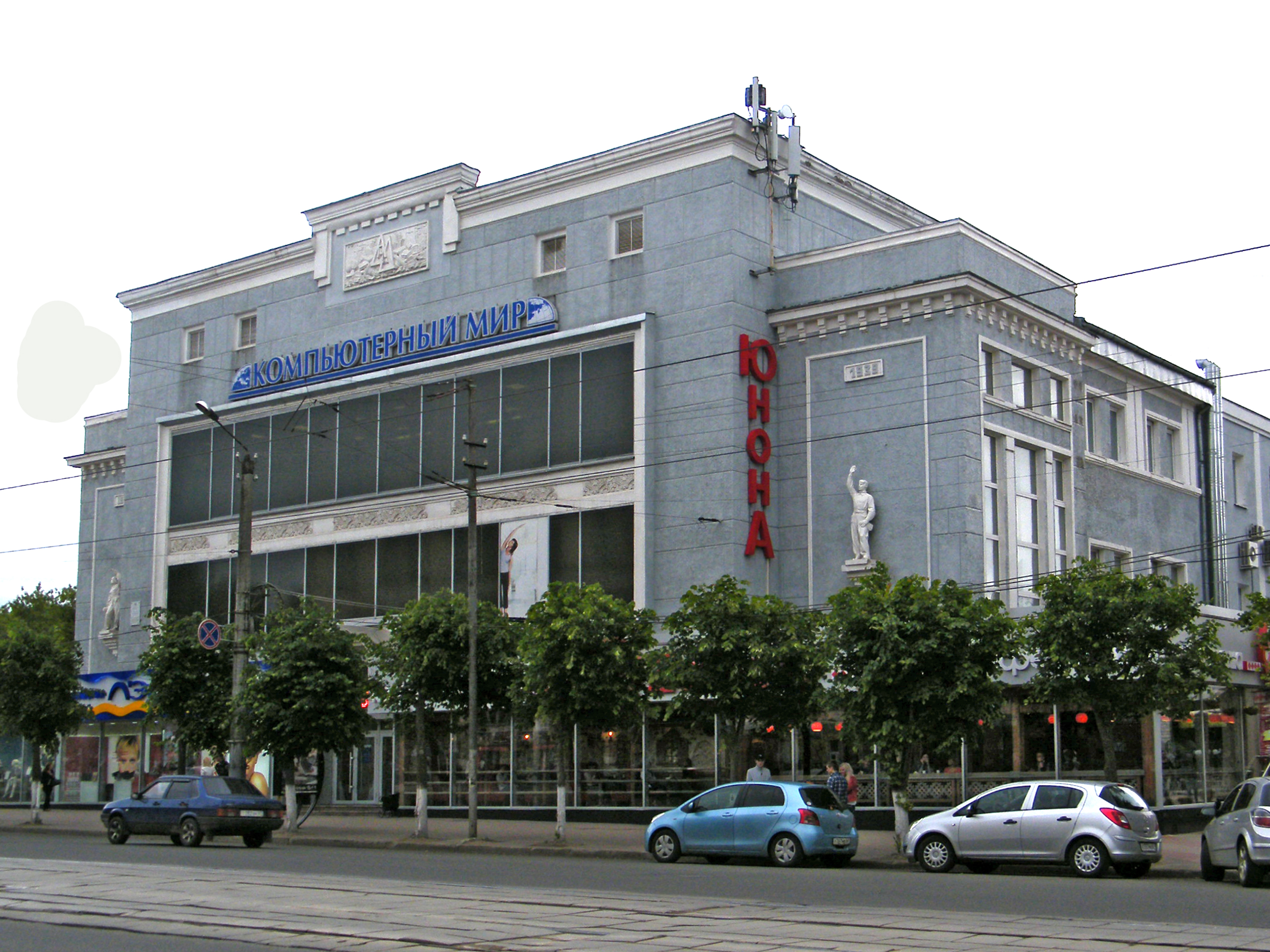
Department Store building

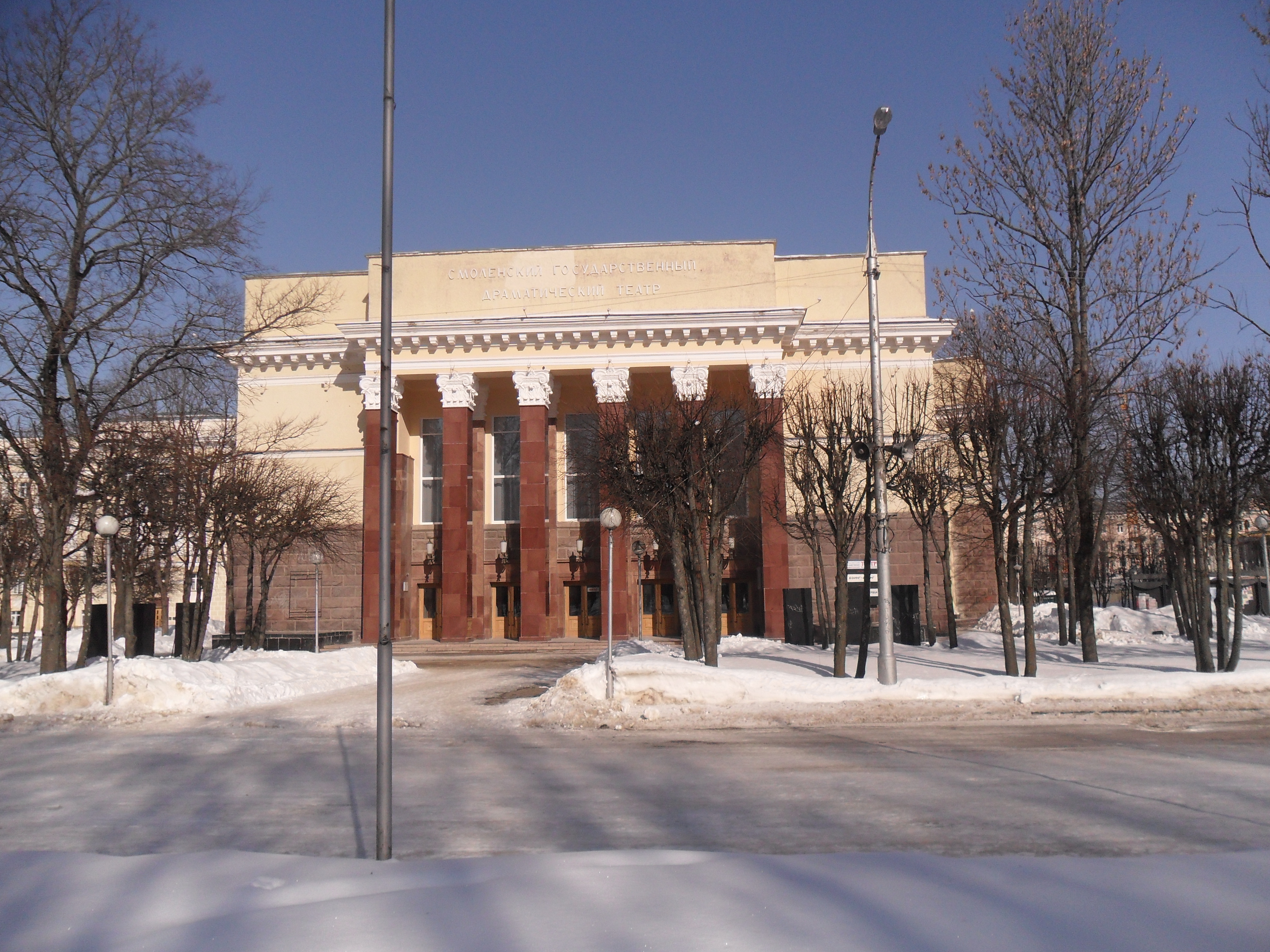
The A. Griboedov Smolensk Drama Theater

=== The Smolensk Kremlin ===
The Smolensk Kremlin, built at the end of the 16th century during the reign of Tsars Fyodor I Ioannovich and Boris Godunov, under the supervision of the architect Fyodor Kon, is one of the greatest achievements of Russian medieval architecture and military engineering.

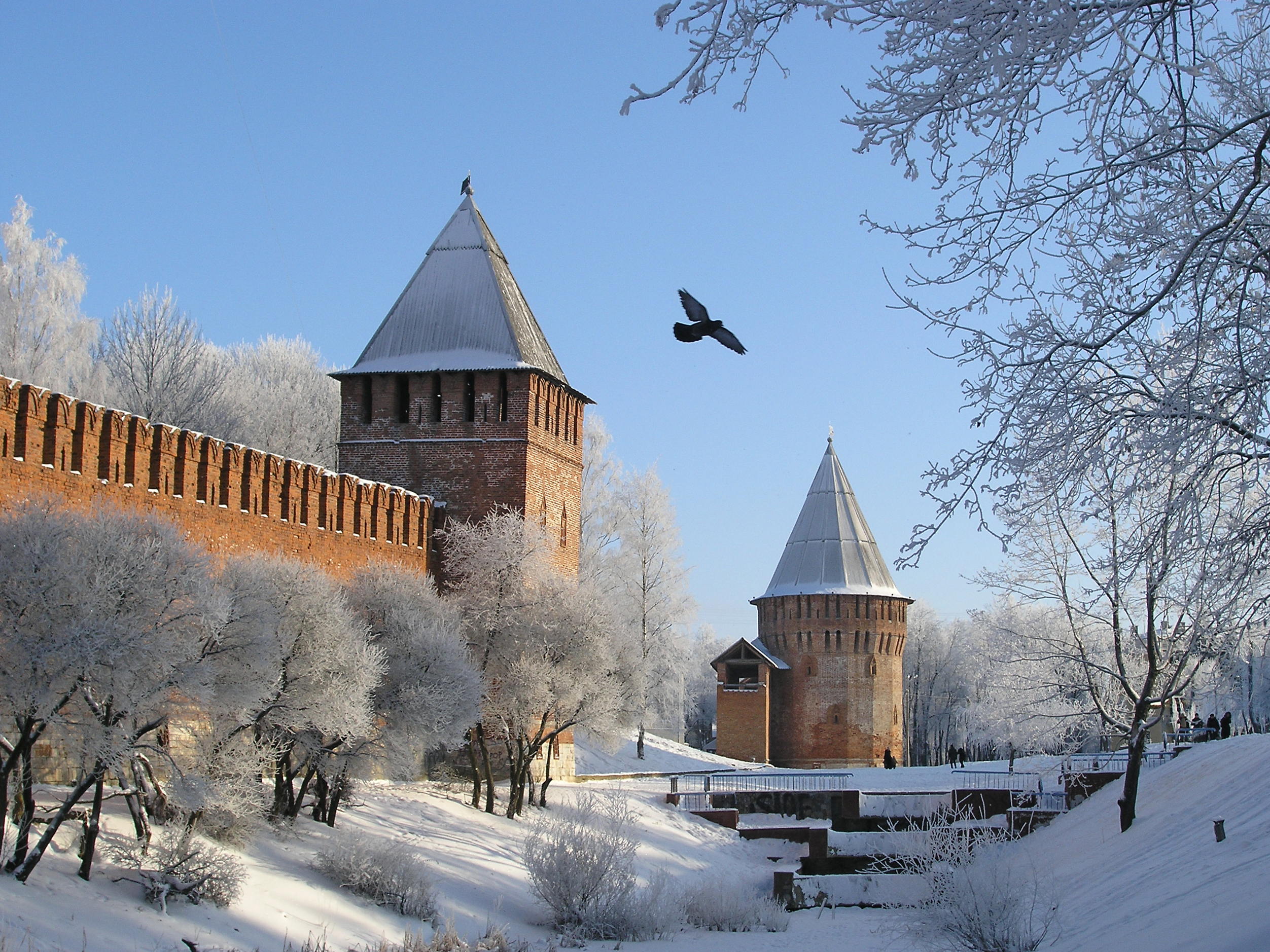
The walls of Smolensk

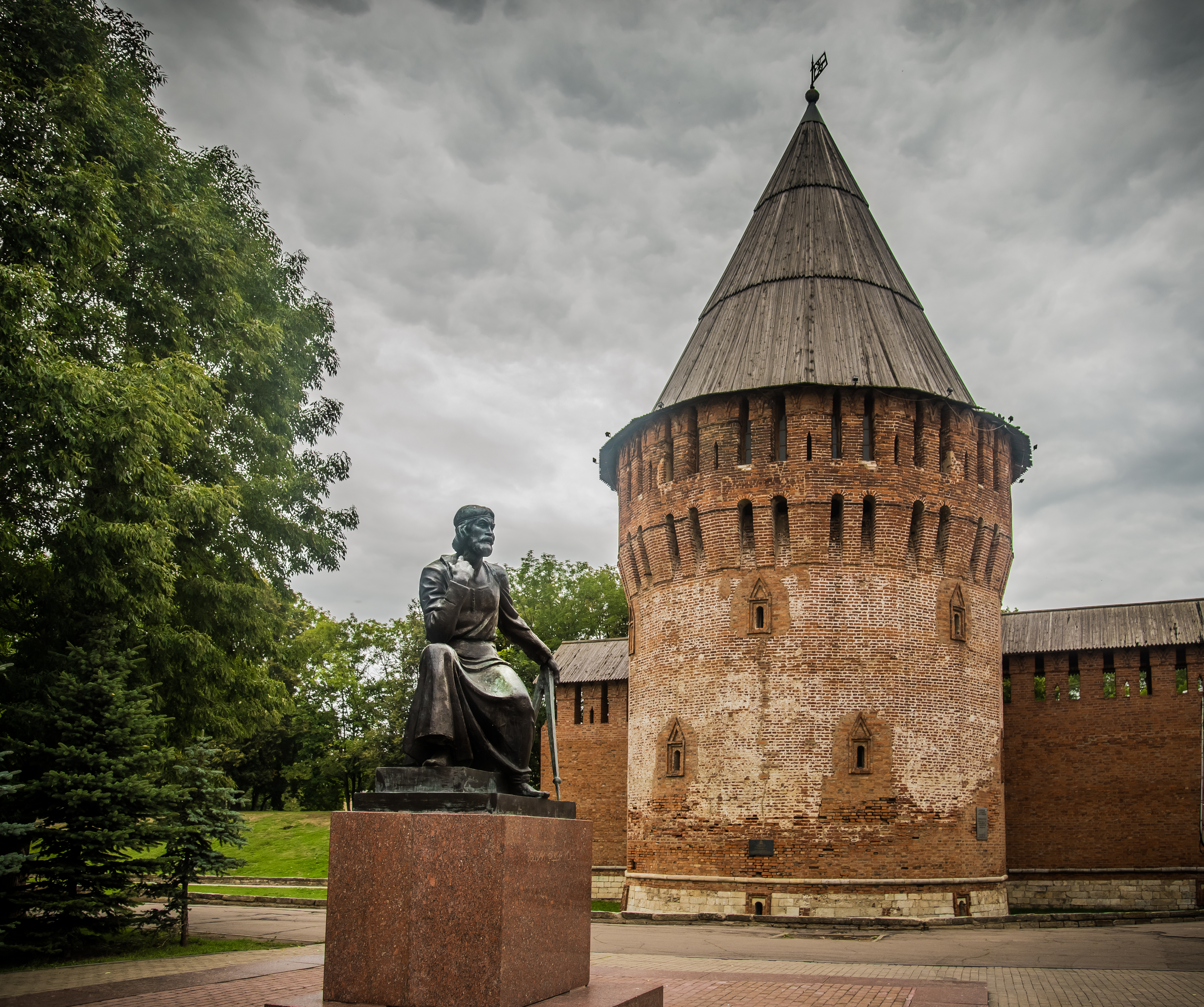
Monument to Fyodor Kon

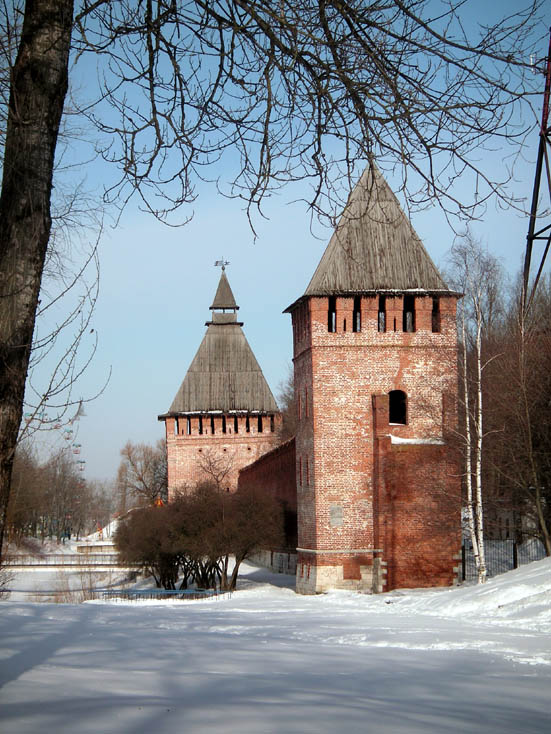
Bubleika Tower

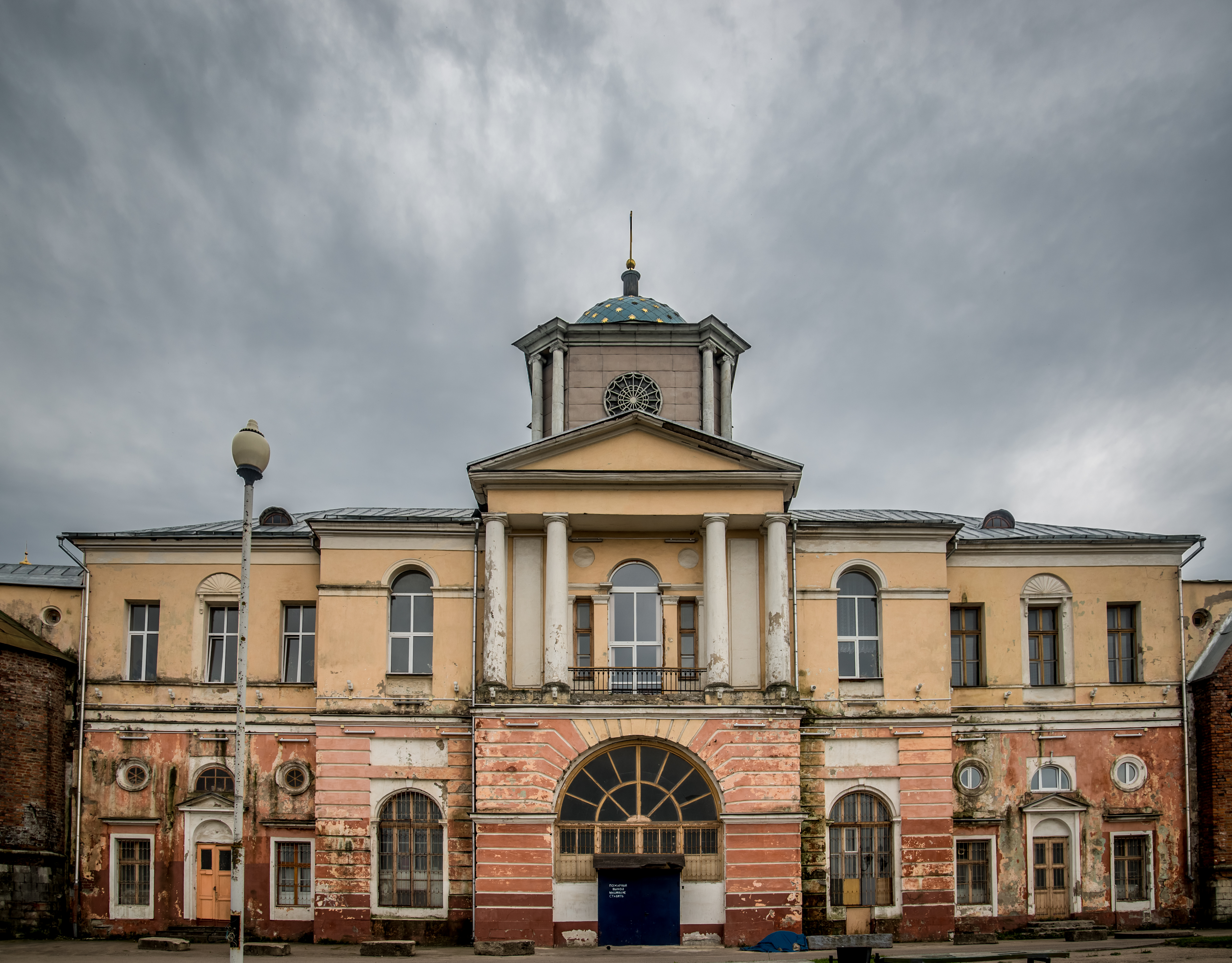
Dnieper Gate

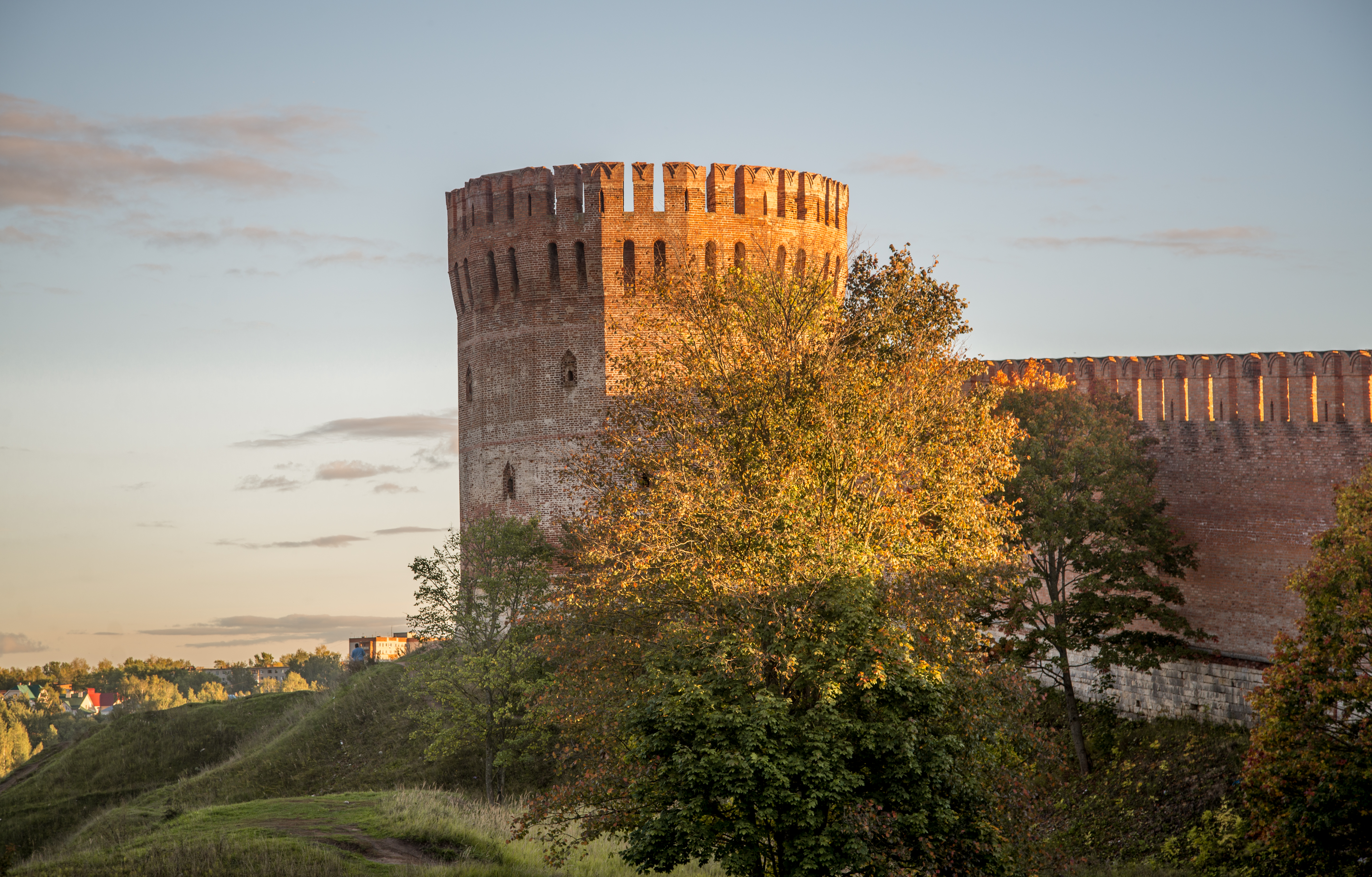
Oryol Tower

=== Churches and cathedrals ===
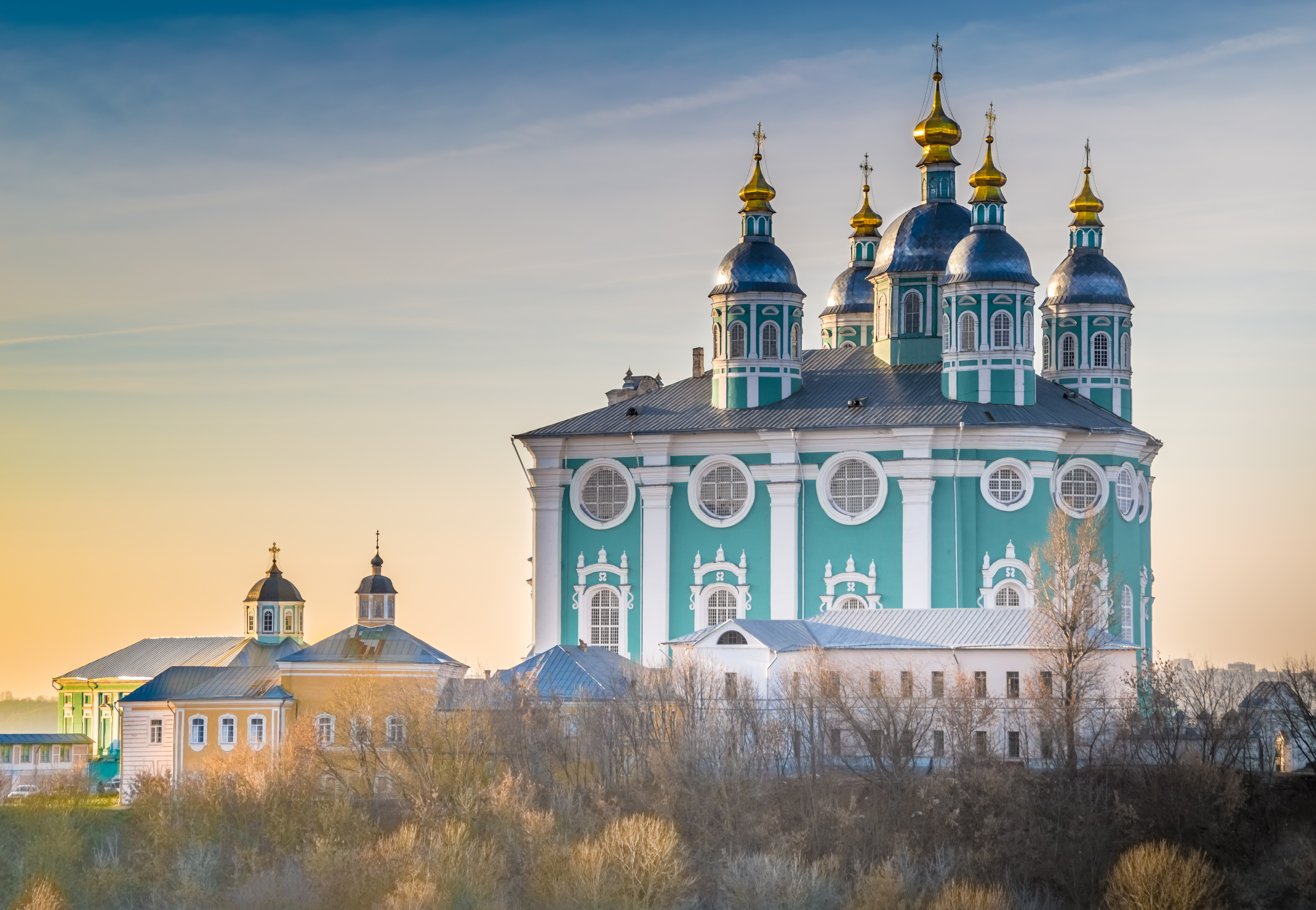
Cathedral of the Assumption

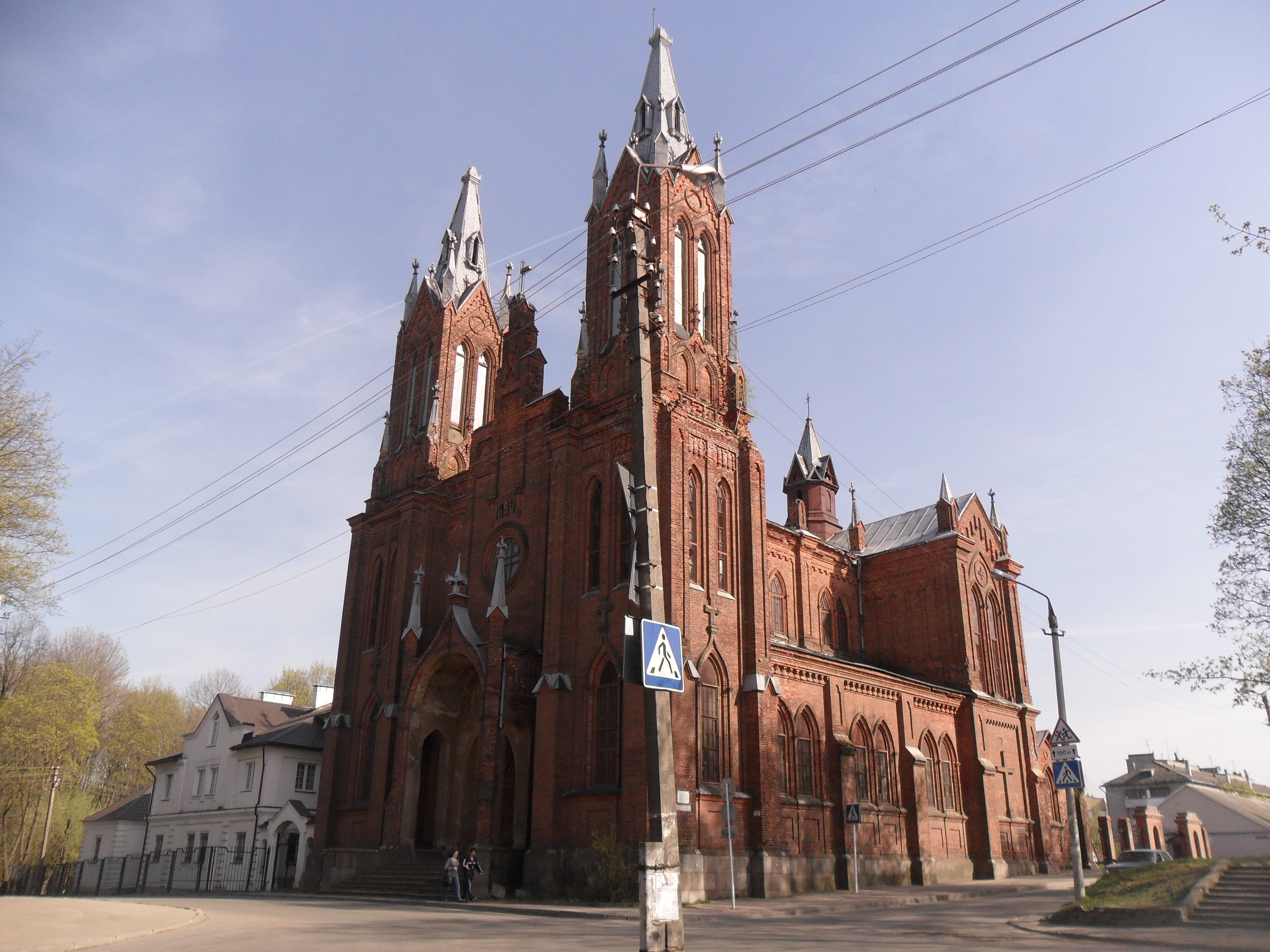
Immaculate Conception Church

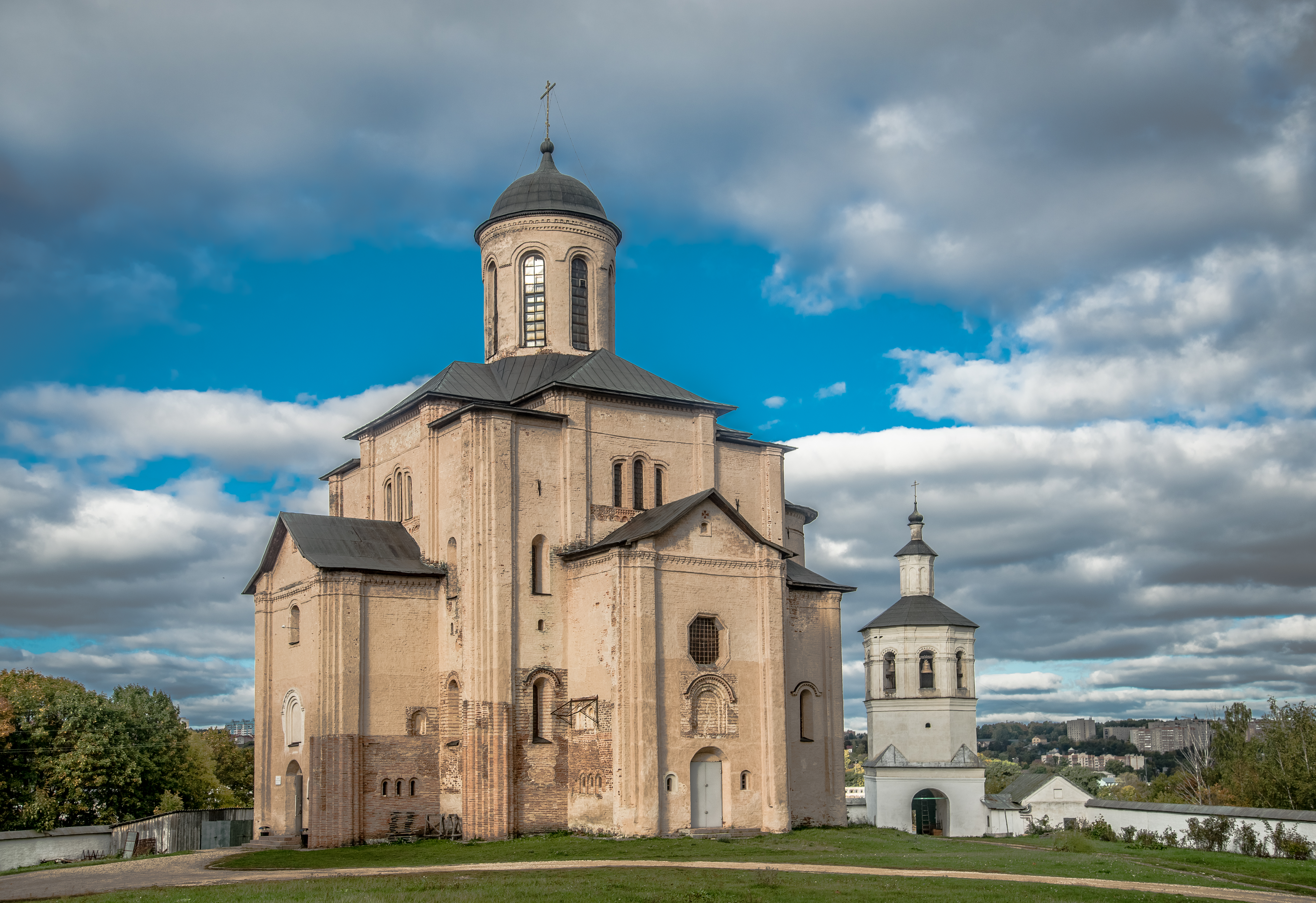
Church of St. Michael the Archangel

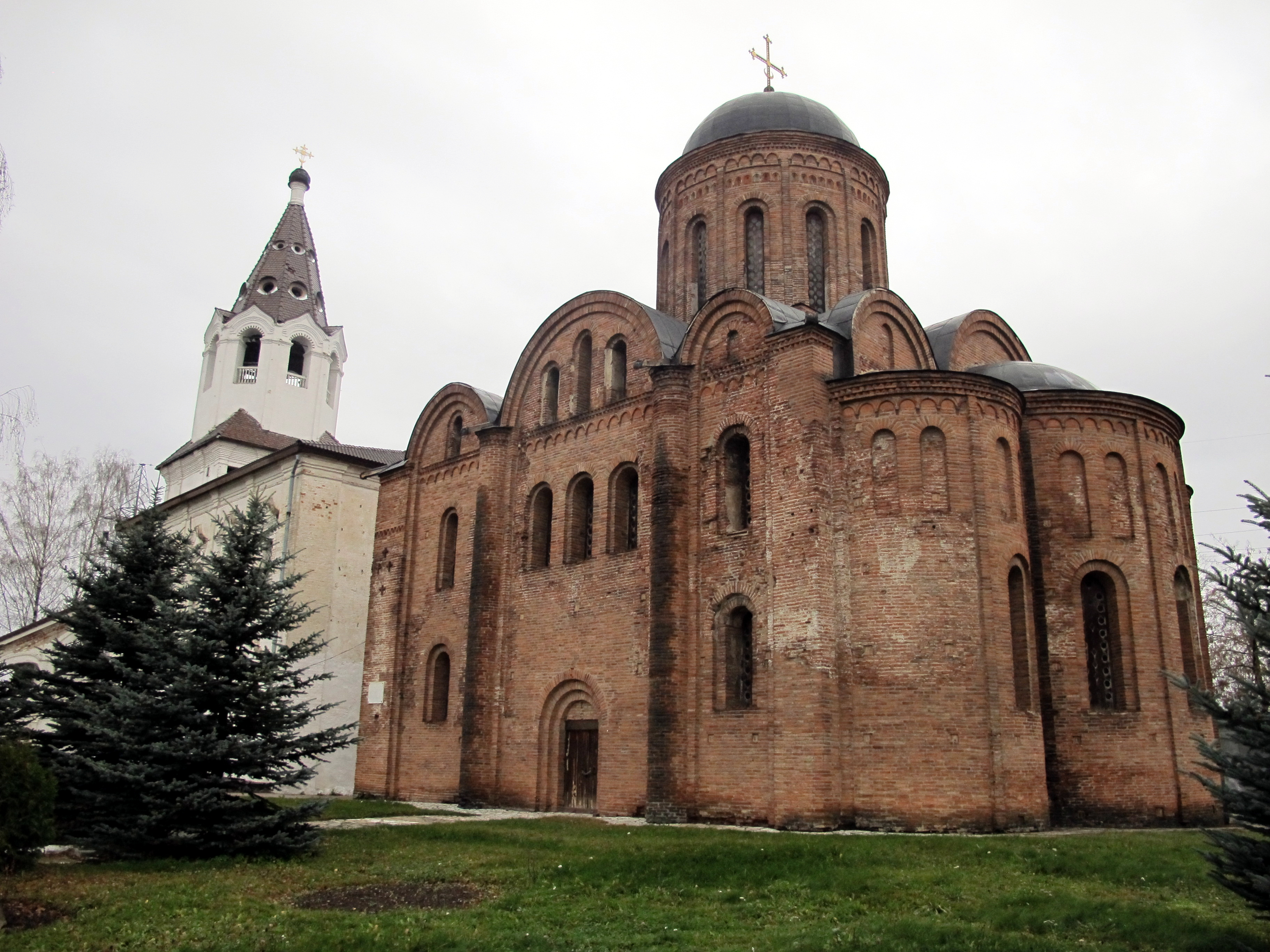
Church of St. Peter and St. Paul on Gorodyanska

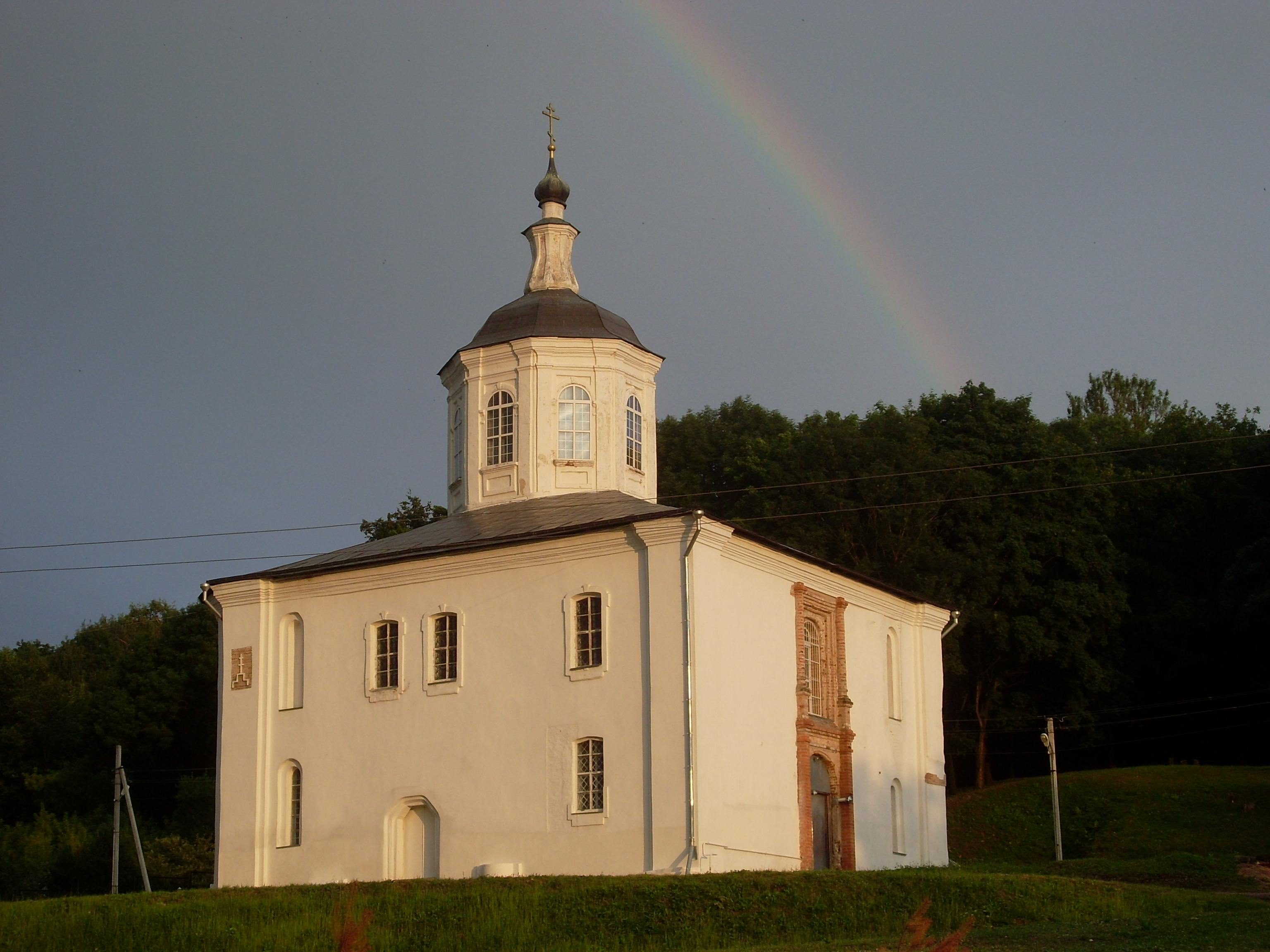
Temple of St. John the Divine

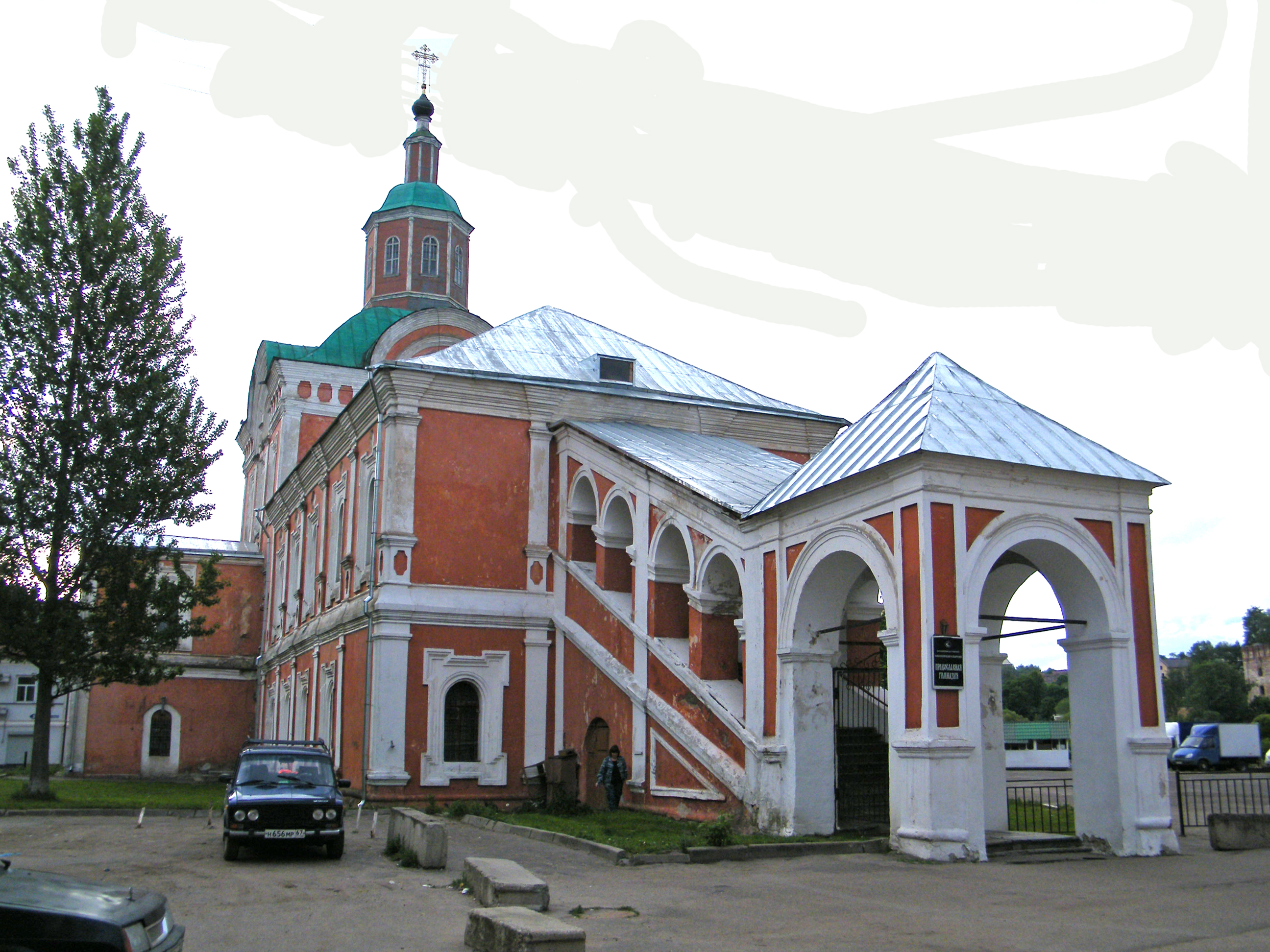
Church of St. Nicholas

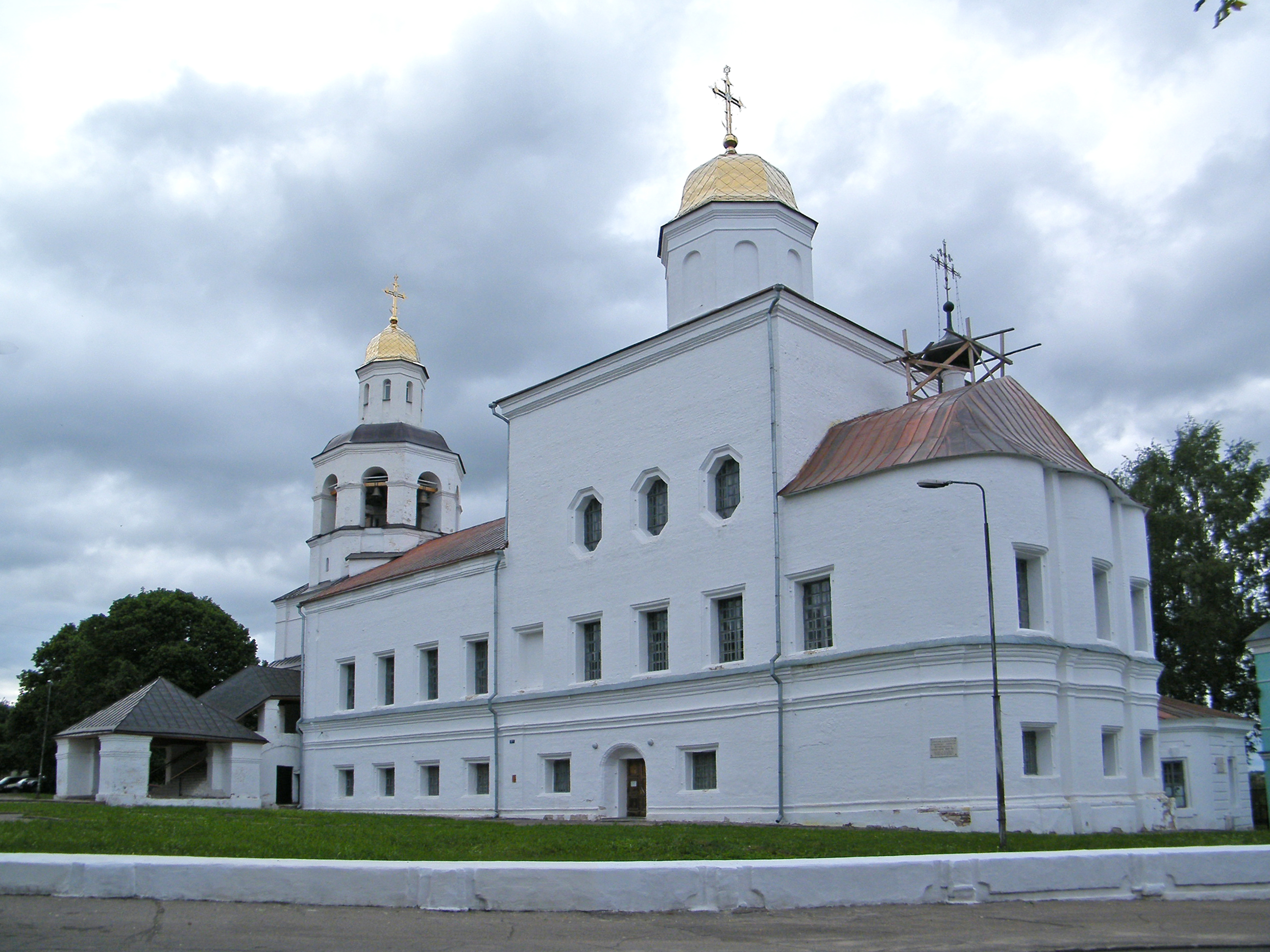
Ascension Cathedral

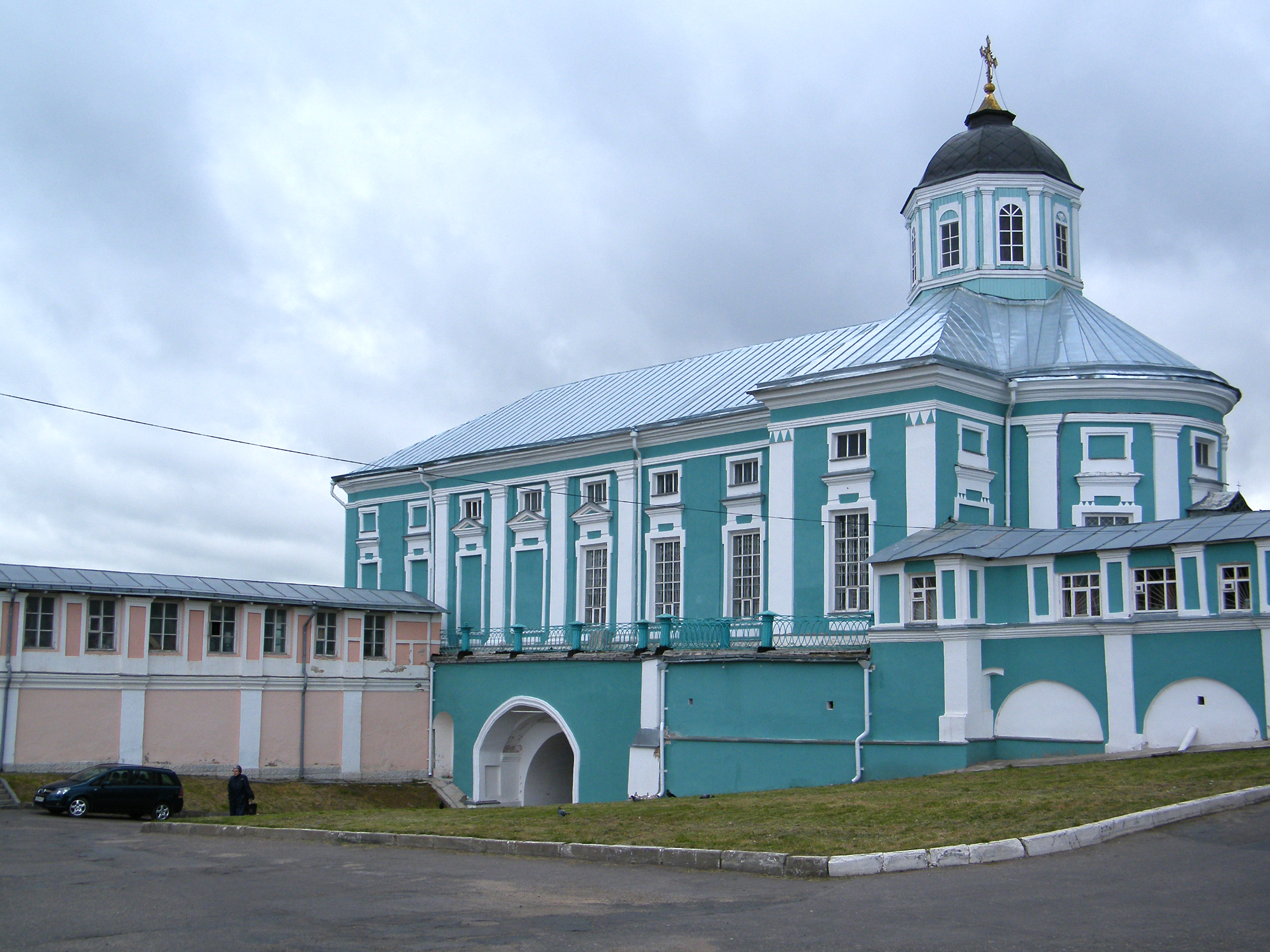
Epiphany Cathedral

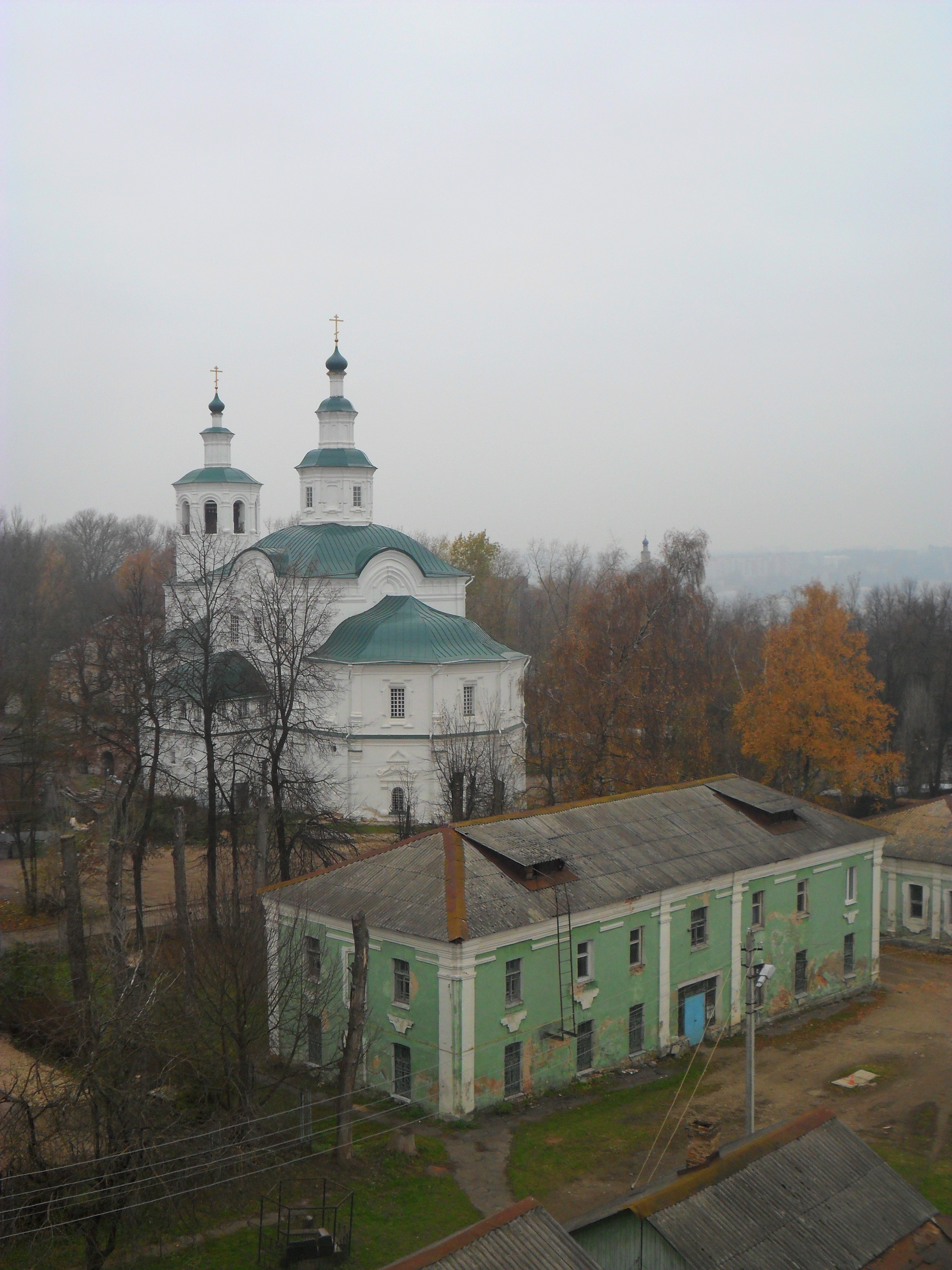
Savior-Transfiguration Avraamiev Monastery

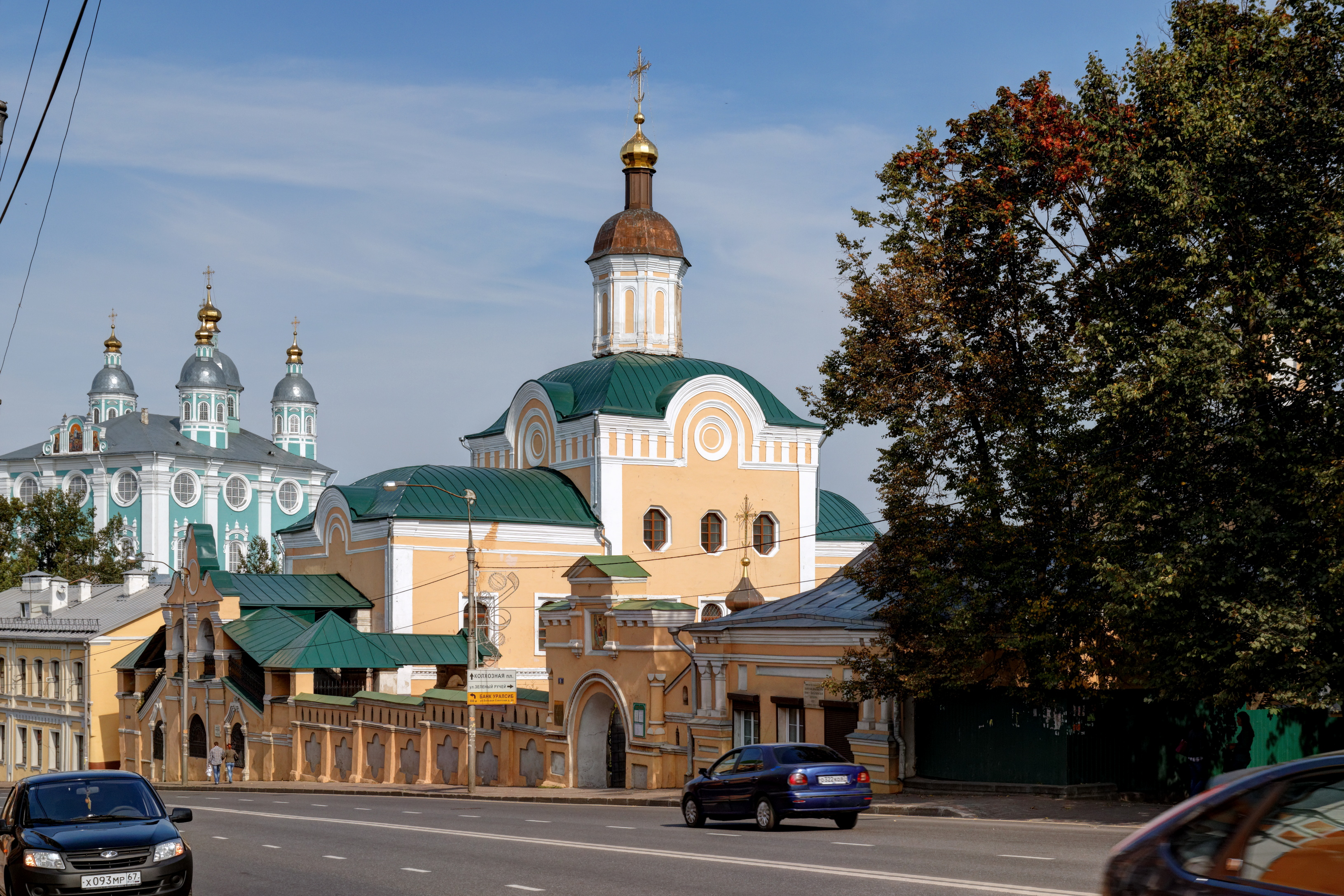
Holy Trinity Cathedral

=== Monuments ===
Being the site of many battles in Russian history, Smolensk is home to many monuments commemorating its military history.

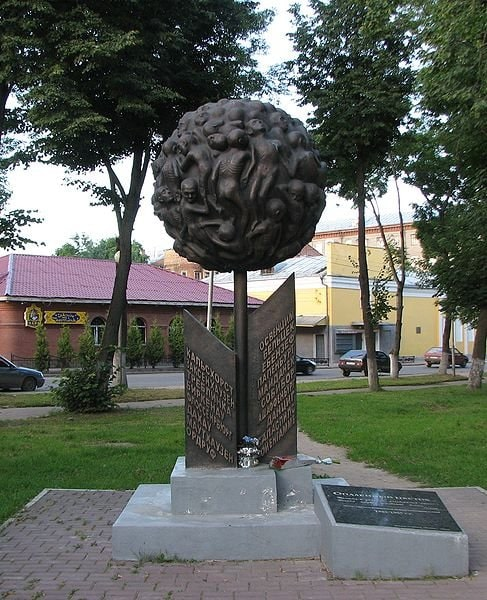
The Scorched Flower, a monument to child prisoners of Nazi concentration camps

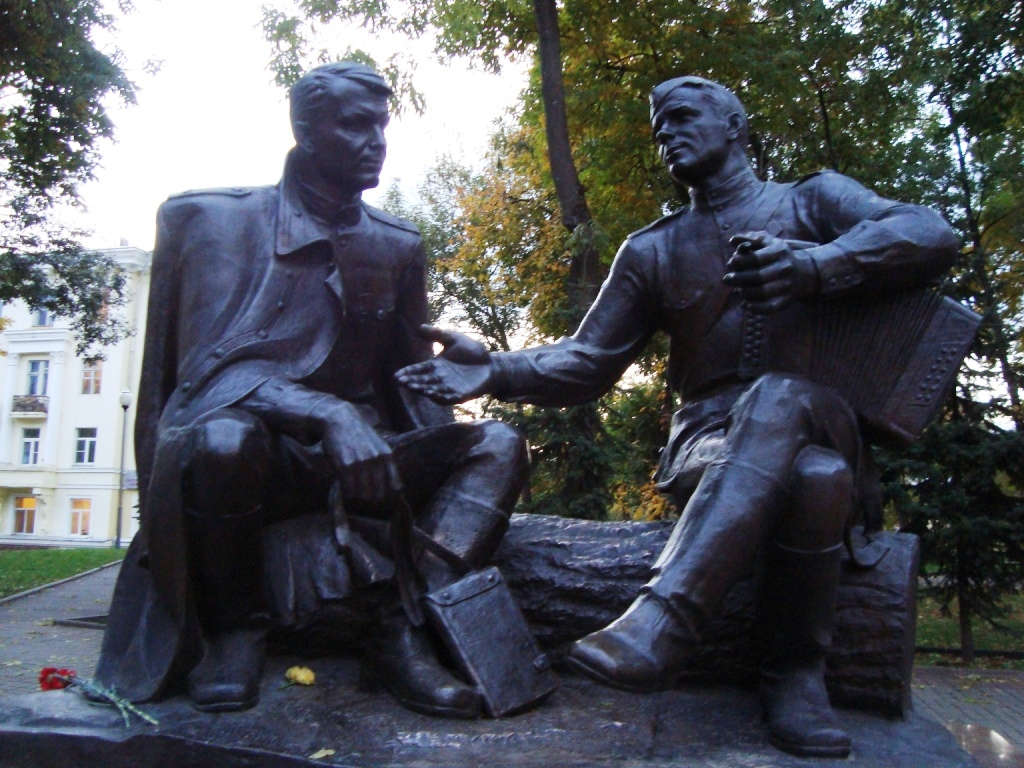
Monument to Alexander Tvardovsky and Vasily Terkin

==== Lopatinsky garden ====
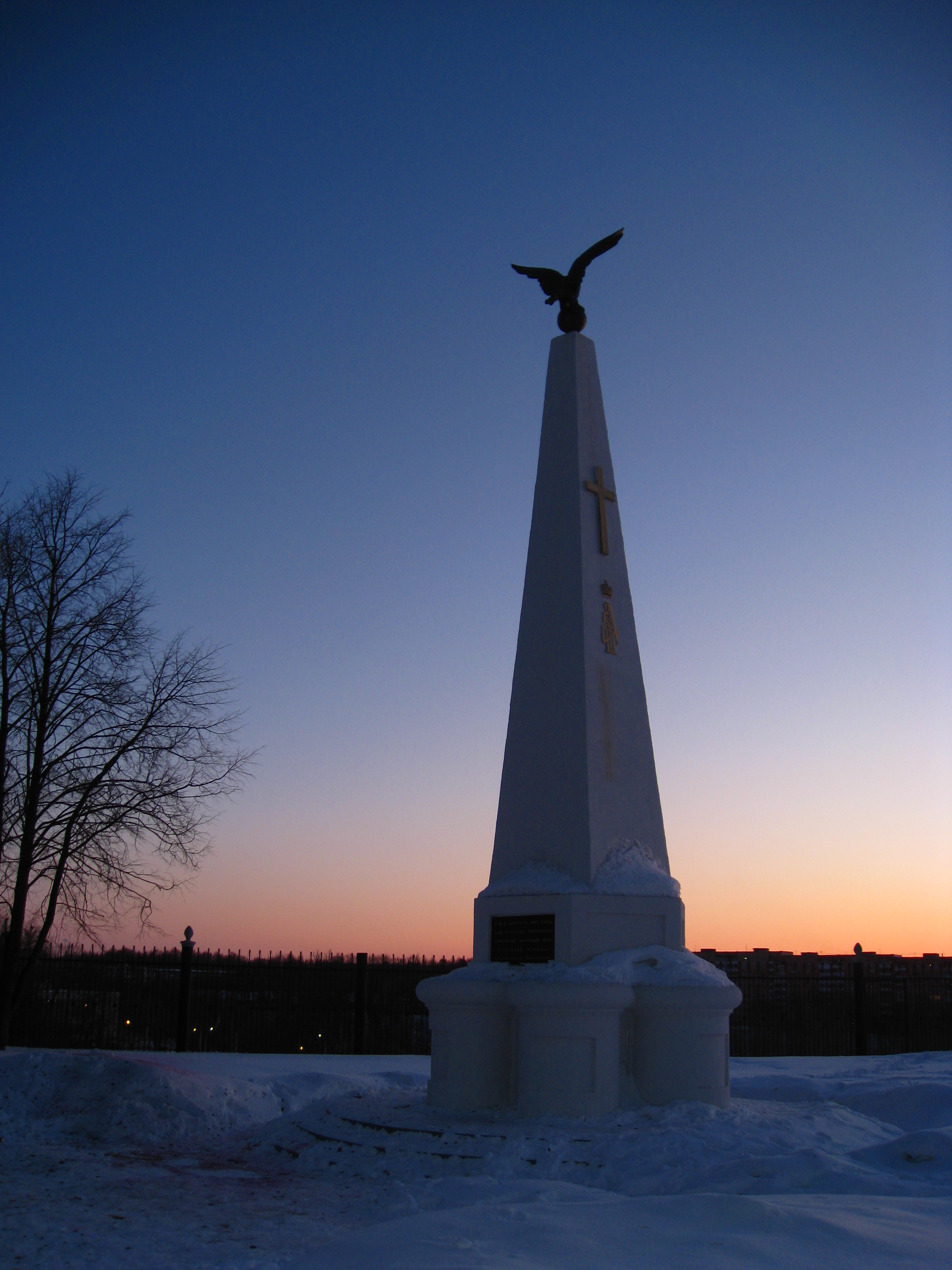
Monument to the 2nd Sofia Infantry Regiment

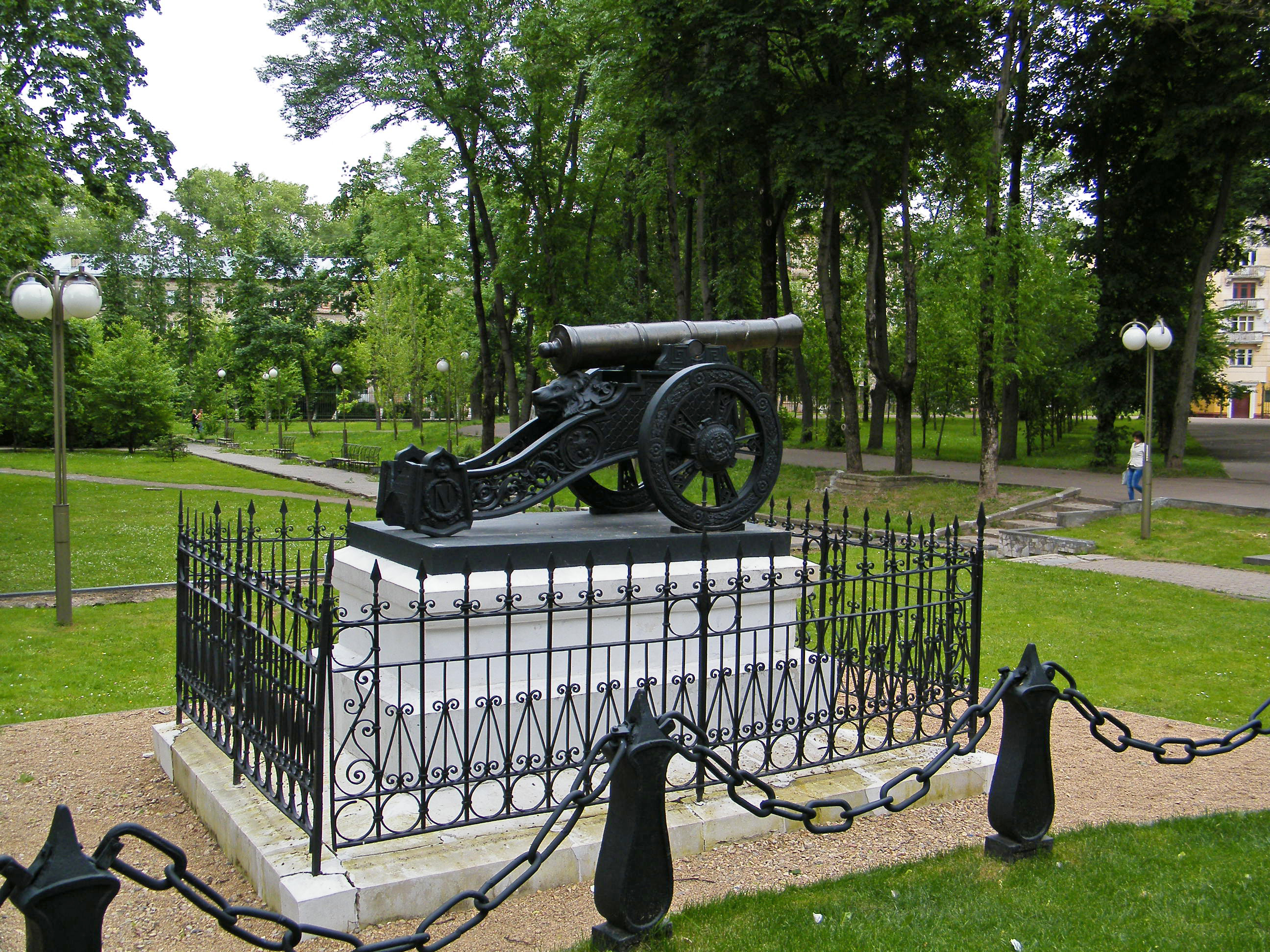
Cannon in Lopatinsky garden

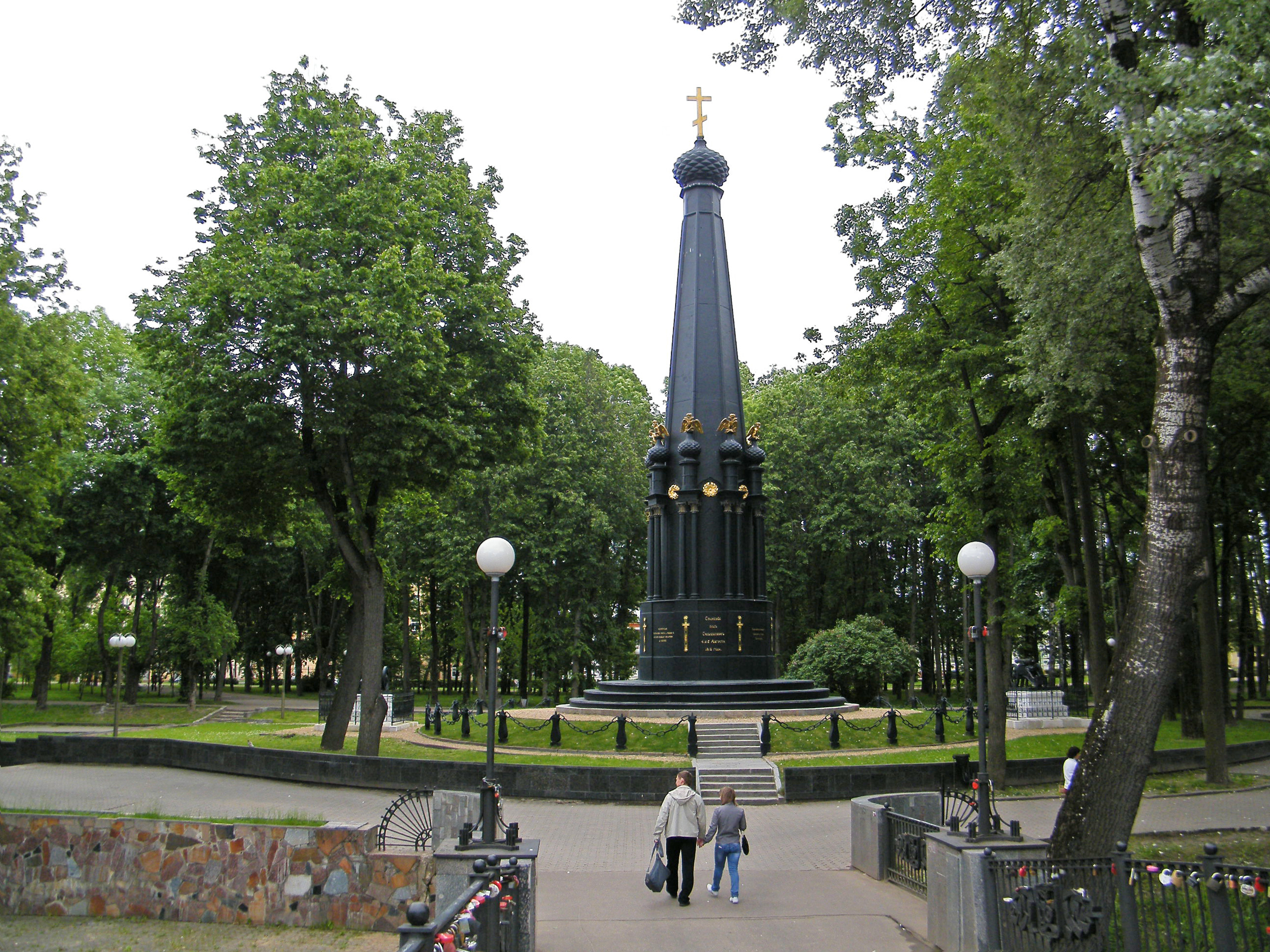
Monument to the defenders of Smolensk

==== Square of Memory of Heroes ====
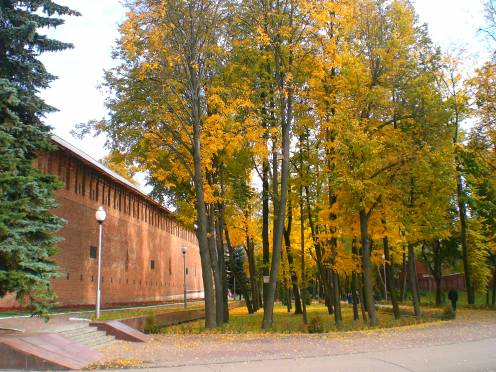
View of the Heroes' Square

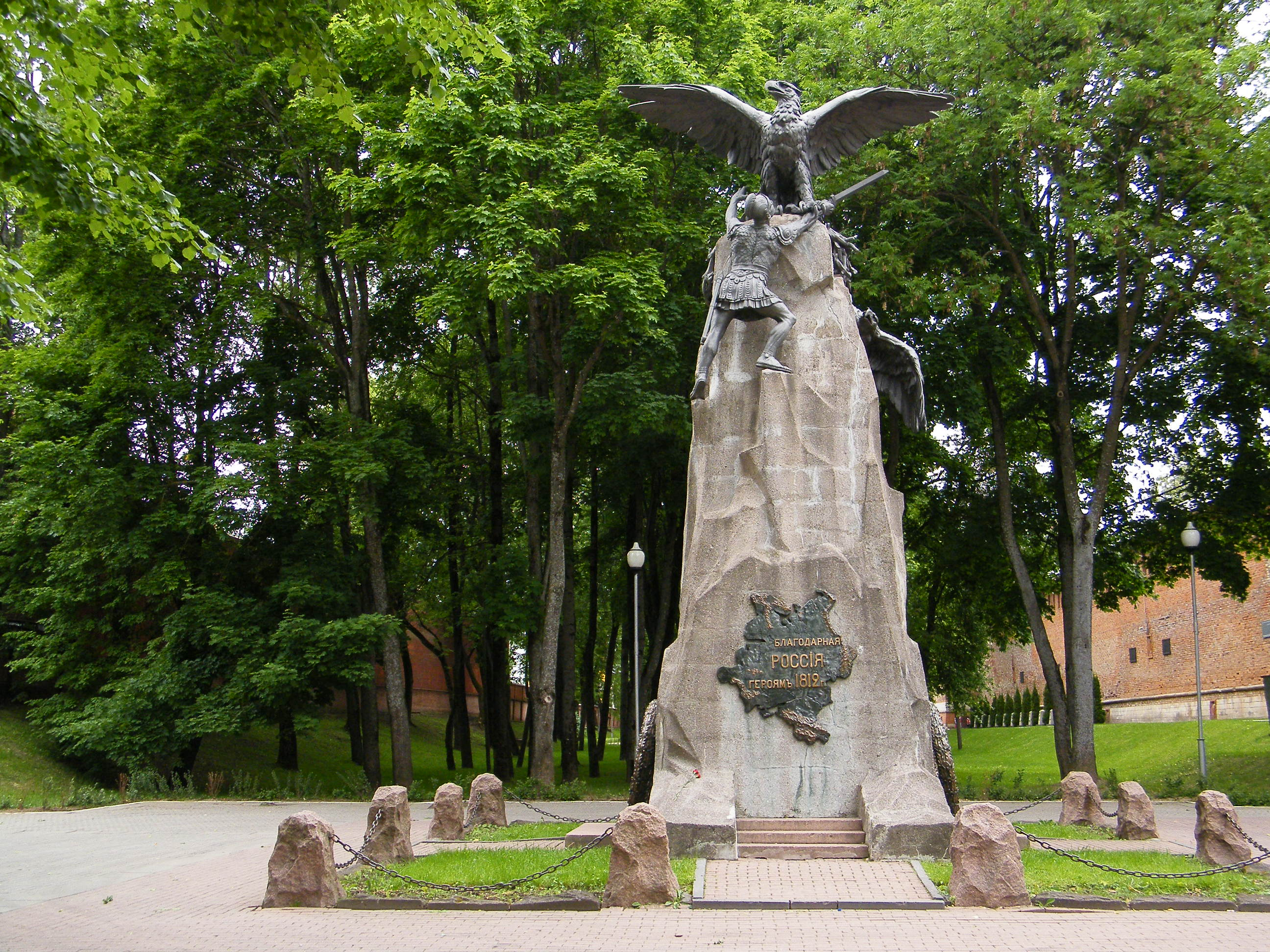
The "Grateful Russia" Monument, commemorating the centenary of the Russian victory over Napoleon

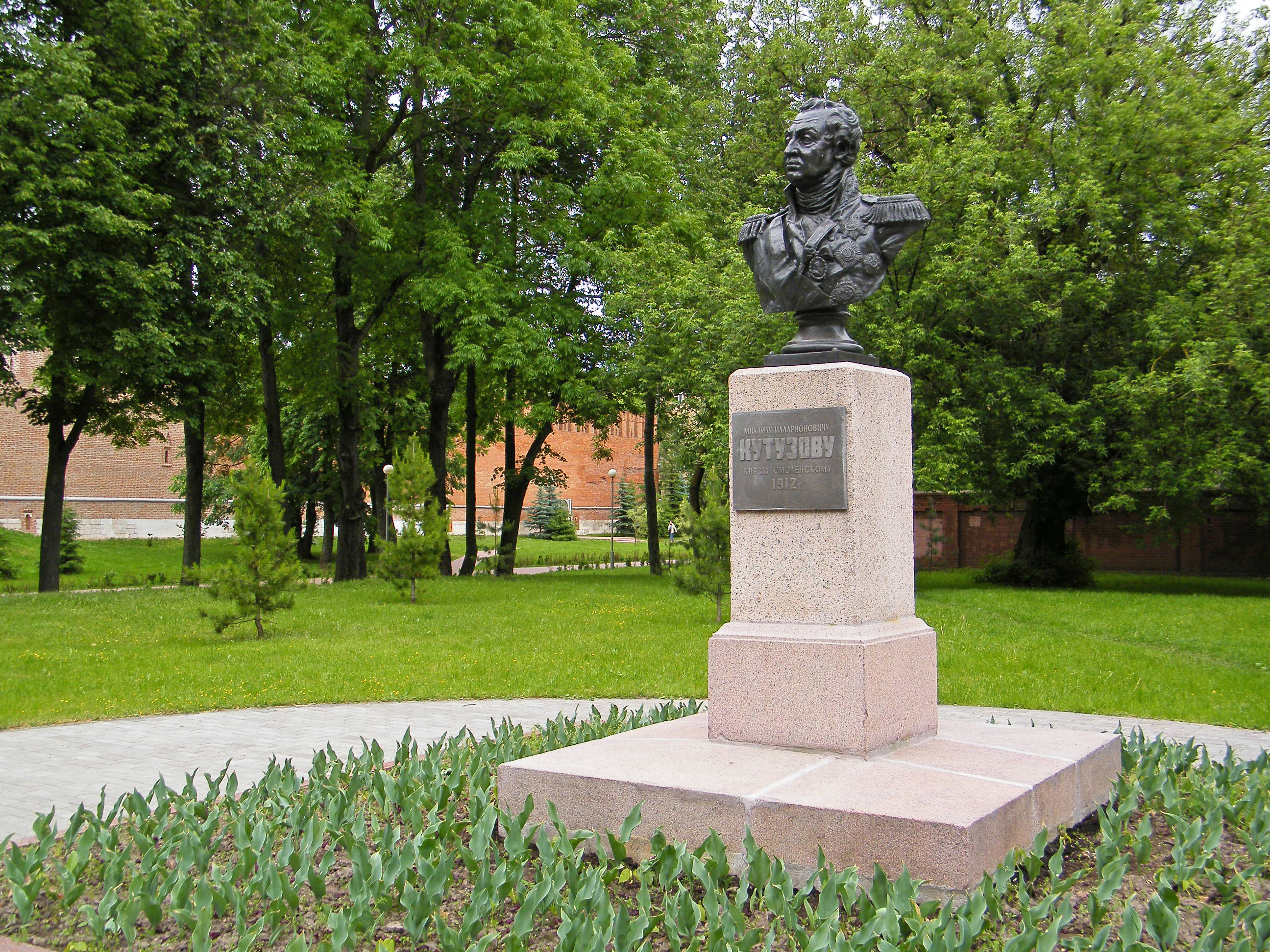
The bust of Mikhail Kutuzov

=== Education buildings ===
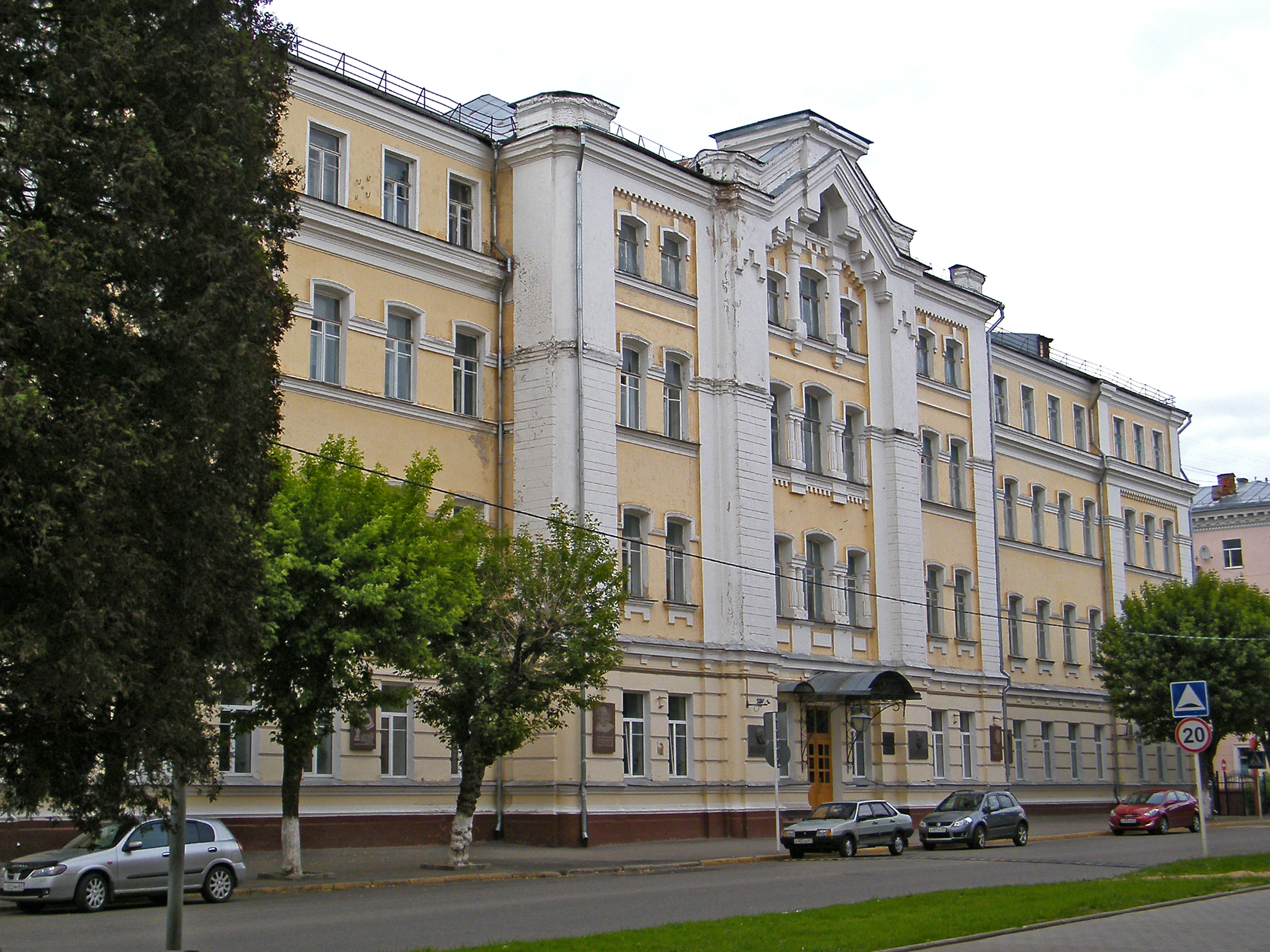
Smolensk State University building

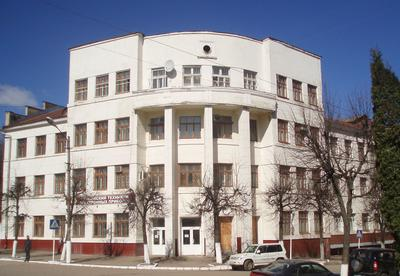
Smolensk Polytechnic College building

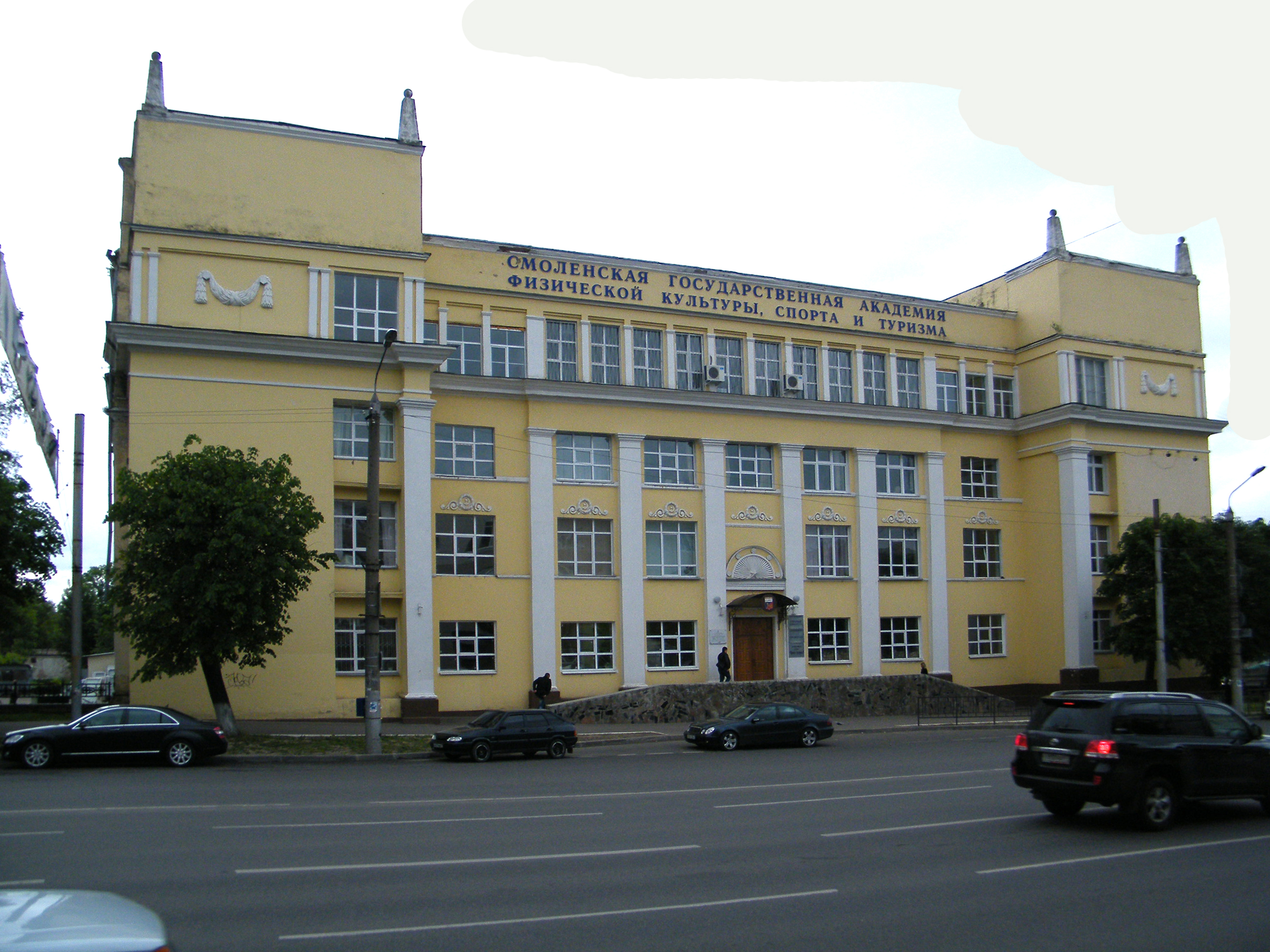
Smolensk Academy of Physical Culture, Sports and Tourism building

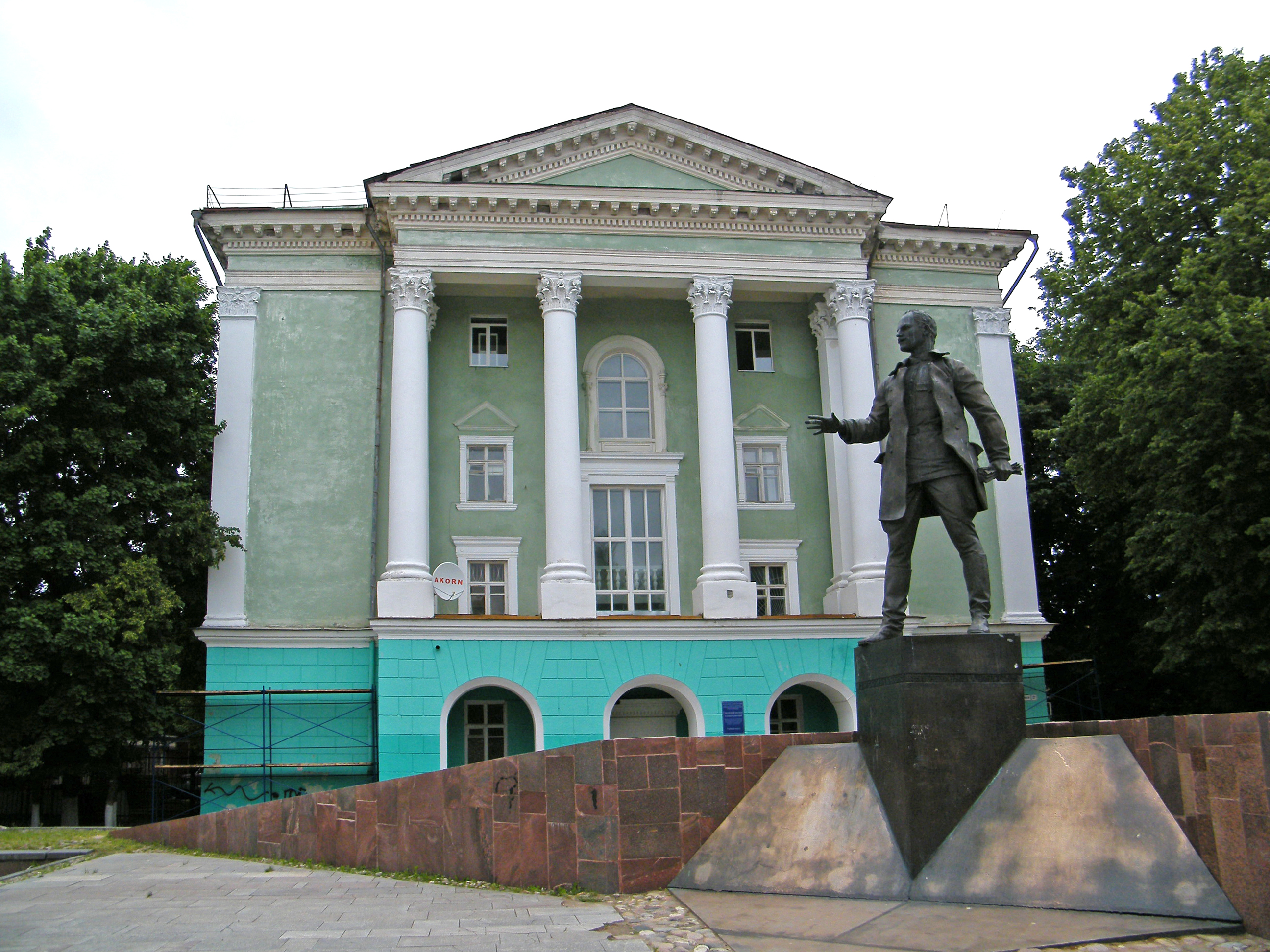
Smolensk College of Telecommunications building

=== Post-war Stalinist buildings ===
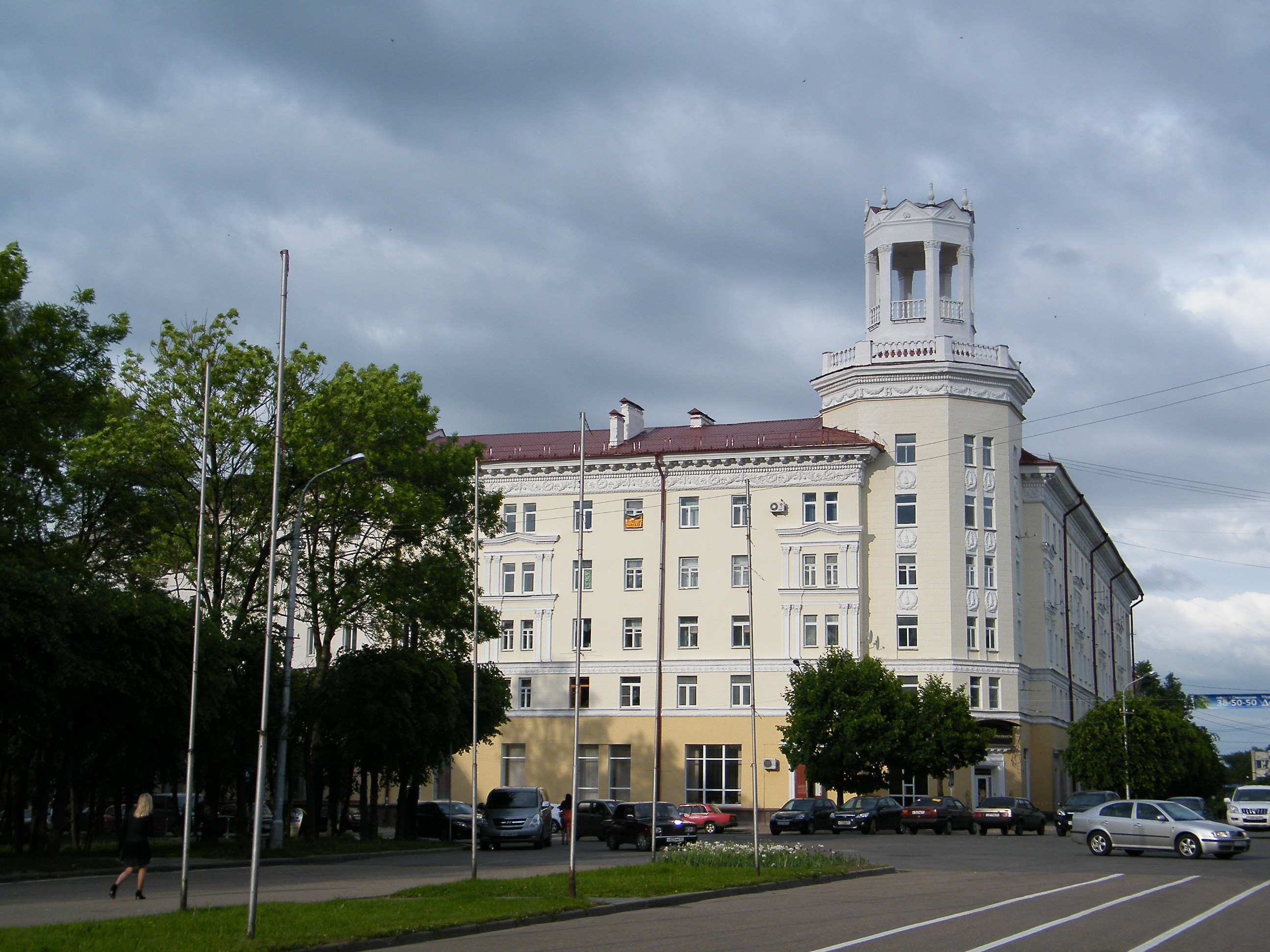

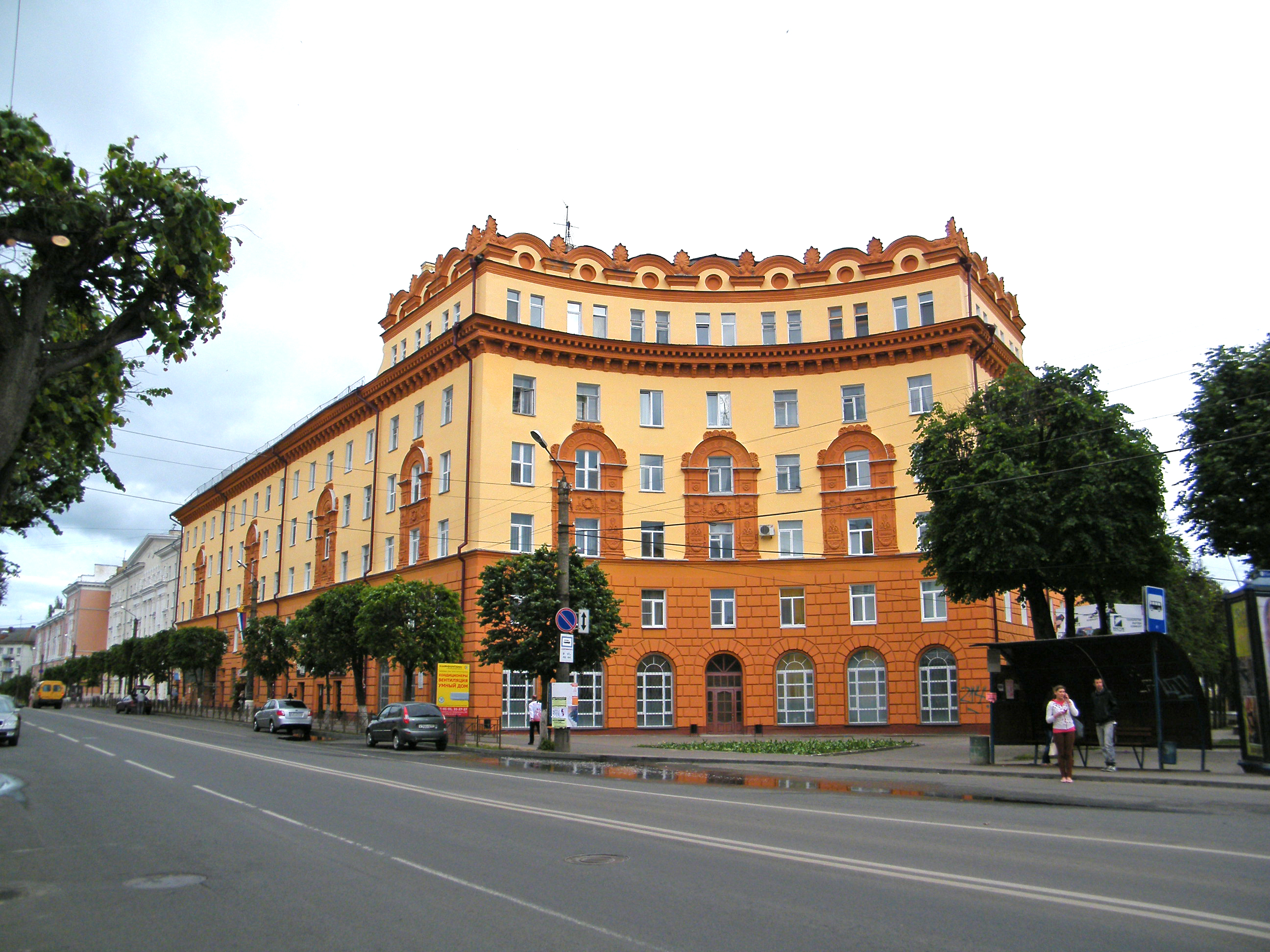

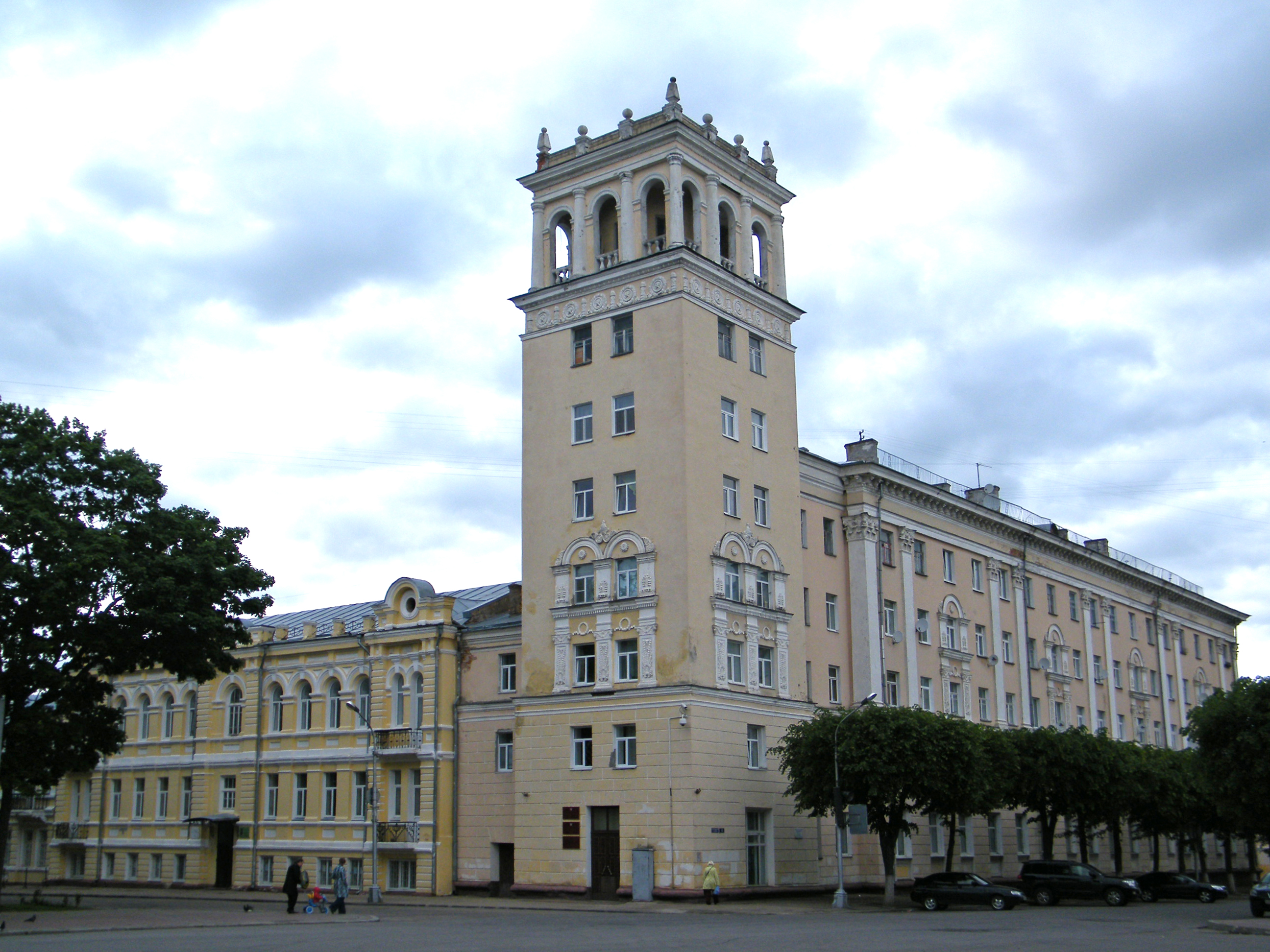

== Administrative and municipal status ==
Smolensk serves as the administrative center of the oblast and, within the framework of administrative divisions, it also serves as the administrative center of Smolensky District, even though it is not a part of it. As an administrative division, it is incorporated separately as Smolensk Urban Okrug—an administrative unit with the status equal to that of the districts. As a municipal division, this administrative unit also has urban okrug status.

== Politics ==
Chairman of the City Council of the VI convocation (since 24 December 2021) – Anatoly Ovsyankin (United Russia).

The Smolensk City Council of the VI convocation was elected on 13 September 2020. The party composition of the current city council is as follows: United Russia – 23 deputies, the Communist Party of the Russian Federation – 4 deputies, the Liberal Democratic Party of Russia – 1 deputy, A Just Russia – 1 deputy, Party of Pensioners – 1 deputy.

== Climate ==
Smolensk has a warm-summer humid continental climate (Köppen climate classification Dfb). By European standards, the climate is quite cold for its latitude on 54°N. The far inland position warms springs up relatively quickly, with May being quite a bit milder than September.

Climate data for Smolensk (1991–2020, extremes 1887–present)
Month	Jan	Feb	Mar	Apr	May	Jun	Jul	Aug	Sep	Oct	Nov	Dec	Year
Record high °C (°F)	9.3 (48.7)	9.0 (48.2)	23.3 (73.9)	28.0 (82.4)	30.6 (87.1)	33.3 (91.9)	34.5 (94.1)	37.2 (99.0)	29.5 (85.1)	24.8 (76.6)	14.6 (58.3)	9.8 (49.6)	37.2 (99.0)
Mean daily maximum °C (°F)	−3.5 (25.7)	−2.6 (27.3)	3.0 (37.4)	11.7 (53.1)	18.3 (64.9)	21.5 (70.7)	23.6 (74.5)	22.3 (72.1)	16.6 (61.9)	9.2 (48.6)	2.0 (35.6)	−2.1 (28.2)	10.0 (50.0)
Daily mean °C (°F)	−5.8 (21.6)	−5.5 (22.1)	−0.8 (30.6)	6.7 (44.1)	12.7 (54.9)	16.1 (61.0)	18.2 (64.8)	16.7 (62.1)	11.4 (52.5)	5.5 (41.9)	−0.2 (31.6)	−4.2 (24.4)	5.9 (42.6)
Mean daily minimum °C (°F)	−8.4 (16.9)	−8.6 (16.5)	−4.3 (24.3)	2.0 (35.6)	7.3 (45.1)	10.8 (51.4)	13.1 (55.6)	11.8 (53.2)	7.1 (44.8)	2.3 (36.1)	−2.4 (27.7)	−6.4 (20.5)	2.0 (35.6)
Record low °C (°F)	−37.9 (−36.2)	−36.8 (−34.2)	−28.1 (−18.6)	−15.9 (3.4)	−5.4 (22.3)	−0.7 (30.7)	4.4 (39.9)	0.3 (32.5)	−4.4 (24.1)	−12.8 (9.0)	−23.8 (−10.8)	−35.2 (−31.4)	−37.9 (−36.2)
Average precipitation mm (inches)	48 (1.9)	45 (1.8)	44 (1.7)	39 (1.5)	73 (2.9)	82 (3.2)	88 (3.5)	84 (3.3)	61 (2.4)	71 (2.8)	57 (2.2)	51 (2.0)	743 (29.3)
Average extreme snow depth cm (inches)	19 (7.5)	25 (9.8)	22 (8.7)	2 (0.8)	0 (0)	0 (0)	0 (0)	0 (0)	0 (0)	0 (0)	4 (1.6)	11 (4.3)	25 (9.8)
Average rainy days	9	8	10	15	17	18	16	16	16	18	15	11	169
Average snowy days	25	22	16	5	1	0	0	0	1	4	15	23	112
Average relative humidity (%)	87	84	78	69	69	75	77	79	83	85	89	89	80
Mean monthly sunshine hours	35.5	65.4	134.8	190.3	259.5	287.0	288.5	248.7	159.3	83.2	31.0	21.9	1,805.1
Source 1: Pogoda.ru.net
Source 2: NOAA

== Economy ==
Smolensk has several factories including the Smolensk Aviation Plant and several electronics and agricultural machinery factories.

=== Transportation ===
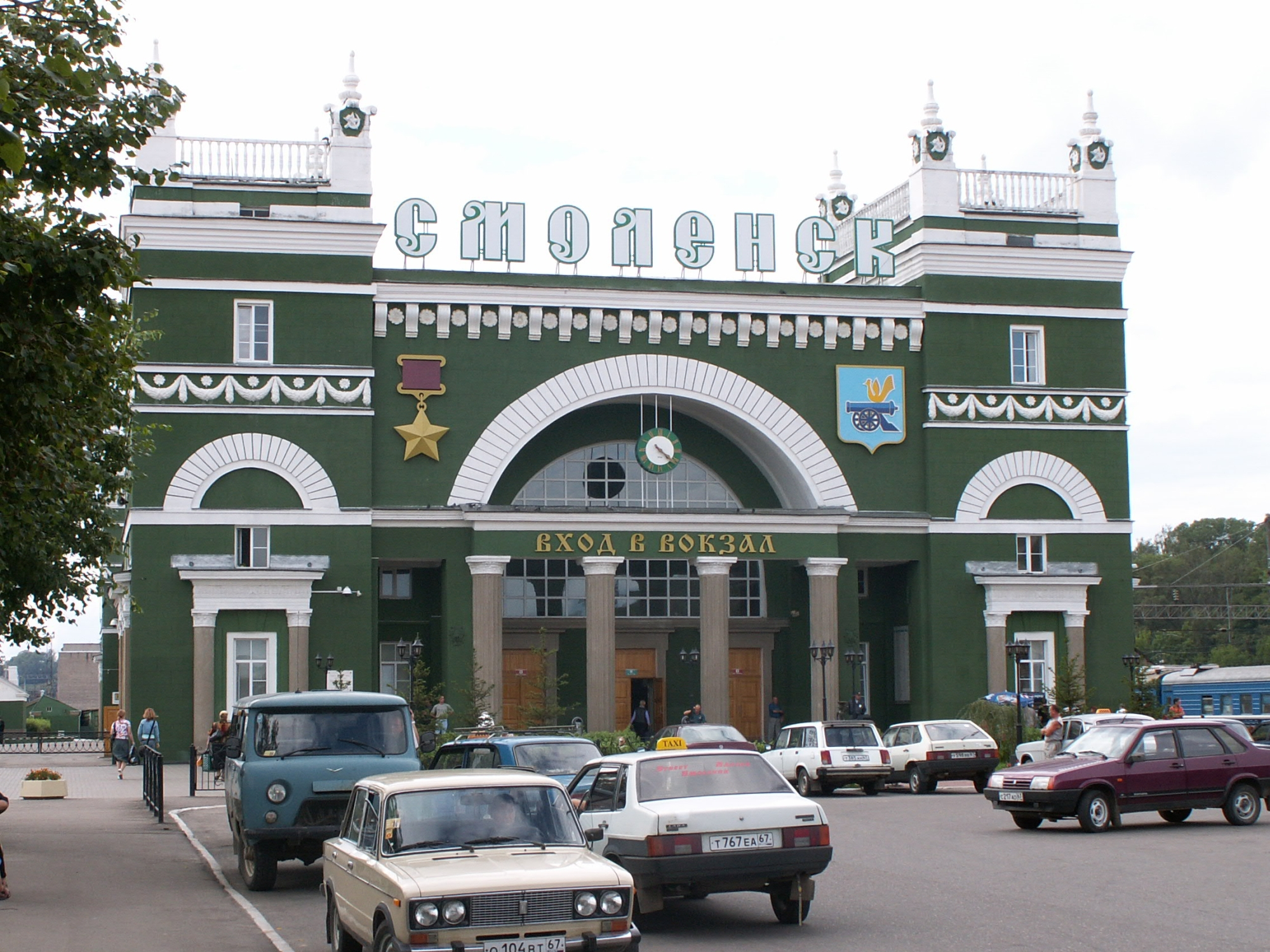
Smolensk railway station

Smolensk is located on the M1 main highway and Moscow–Brest Railway. Since 1870, there is a railway connection between Smolensk and Moscow. Local public transport includes buses and trolleybuses. Public transportation network includes buses, trolleybuses, trams, and marshrutkas.

There are two airports located in the outskirts of the city; Smolensk South (civilian) and Smolensk North (military); however, there are no regular flights scheduled to Smolensk South Airport.

=== Education ===
Smolensk is home to the Smolensk State University (SMOLGU) and the Smolensk State Medical University (affiliated as university in 2015) (SSMU); together with colleges of further education and other educational institutes.

== Twin towns – sister cities ==
Smolensk is twinned with:

- Colorado Springs, United States (1993– suspended 2022)
- Hagen, Germany (1985)
- Kerch, Ukraine (2000)
- Kragujevac, Serbia (2009)
- Targovishte, Bulgaria (2002)
- Tulle, France (1981)
- Vitebsk, Belarus
- Bhopal, India (2025)

== Notable people ==
- Ivan Ivanovich Baryatinsky (1772–1825), Russian Rurikid Prince; father of Prince Aleksandr Baryatinsky.
- Yuri Gagarin (1934–1968), cosmonaut
- Timofey Mikhaylov (1859–1881), revolutionary, one of the assassins of Tsar Alexander II
- Grigorii Maksimov (1893–1950), politician
- Fyodor Glinka (1786–1880) a Russian poet and author.
- Mikhail Glinka (1804 in Novospasskoye – 1857), composer.
- Sergey Glinka (1774–1847) a minor Russian author of the Romantic period.
- Anatoly Kharlampiyev (1906–1979), founder of Sambo
- Eduard Khil (1934–2012), singer
- Patriarch Kirill of Moscow (born 1946), religious leader
- Ekaterina Kletnova (1869–1938), archaeologist, ethnographer and writer
- Sergey Konenkov (1874–1971), sculptor
- Semyon Lavochkin (1900–1960), aircraft designer
- Morris Markin (1893–1970), businessman and founder of Checker Motors Corporation
- Viktor Nemytskii (1900–1967), mathematician
- Grigory Potyomkin (1739 at Chizheva – 1791), statesman.
- Andrey Starovoytov, (1915–1997), IIHF Hall of Fame inductee
- Aleksandr Tvardovsky (1910–1971), writer

== Honors ==
Smolensk Strait between Livingston Island and Deception Island in the South Shetland Islands, Antarctica is named after the city.

A Soviet post World War II project planned the creation of a light cruiser vessel named Smolensk. It was never constructed.

== See also ==
- Battle of Orsha
- Immaculate Conception Church, Smolensk
- Coat of arms of Smolensk
