= Coat of arms of Smolensk =

Official symbol of Smolensk

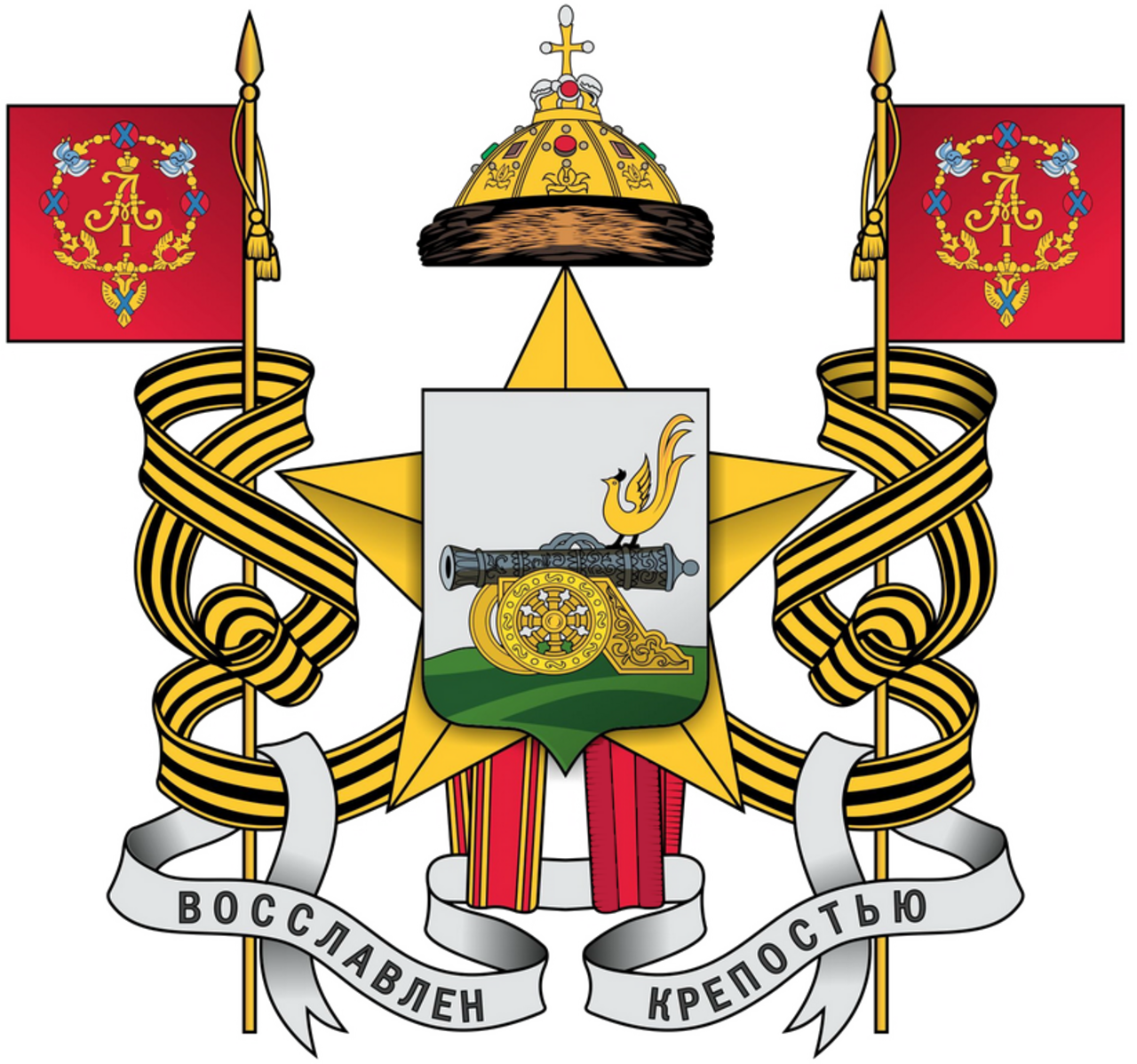
- Earliest mention: 1664
- Adopted: 27 April 2001; 10 (21) October 1780
- Crest: Monomakh's Cap
- Cities: Smolensk
- Motto: "Glorified by Strength" (Russian: «Восславлен крепостью»)
- Orders: Gold Star Medal; Order of Lenin; Order of the Patriotic War; 1st class
- Other elements: Gamayun on a cannon; Two banners; Ribbon of Saint George
- Earlier version: Since the 15th century

The coat of arms of Smolensk is the official heraldic symbol of the city of Smolensk, Smolensk region, Russia. A bird Gamayun on a sable cannon with an or gun carriage is depicted on an argent escutcheon. The coat of arms is embellished with a number of honourable decorations that depict the history of the city.

During the 15th to the 17th centuries, when Smolensk was contested between the Tsardom of Russia and the Grand Duchy of Lithuania, and subsequently the Polish-Lithuanian Commonwealth, the city's coats of arms were composed of a different set of elements. The first coat of arms of the city was approved in 1611, when Smolensk was part of the Polish-Lithuanian Commonwealth. It depicted Archangel Michael trampling the serpent.

The origin of the modern coat of arms is uncertain. It was first documented in 1664 and has been consistently employed as a town, land and title coat of arms since that time. The coat of arms underwent a heraldic revision in 1727 by F. M. Santi, in 1780 by A. A. Volkov, in 1857 by B. K. Köhne (draft), and in 2001 by G. V. Razhnyov (current version).

The Smolensk coat of arms was used in the coat of arms of Smolensk Governorate, the coats of arms of most of its cities, and the coats of arms of Smolensk noble families. The emblem is currently present on the flag of Smolensk, the coat of arms of the Smolensk region, and on the coats of arms and flags of numerous municipalities that are geographically or historically linked to Smolensk or its citizens.

== Description ==
Description of the coat of arms of the Hero City Smolensk:

On the background of a golden five-pointed star there is an argent escutcheon with a sable cannon with an or gun carriage and a bird Gamayun. The shield is crowned by the cap of Monomakh. On the sides of the shield there are two straight gules banners connected by the St George's ribbon. On the banners - the monogram of Emperor Alexander I, decorated with the imperial crown and the chain of the Order of St. Andrew the First-Called. Under the shield there are the ribbons of the Order of Lenin and the Order of the Patriotic War of the 1st class, intertwined with an argent (white) ribbon with the motto "GLORIFIED BY STRENGTH".

— Decision of the Smolensk City Council of 27.04.2001, No. 111 "On the Coat of Arms of the Hero-City of Smolensk"

The certificate attesting to the entry of the coat of arms into the Matricula of the Russian Heraldic Collegium specifies that the colour of the cannon is diamond and that the motto is written in diamond letters on an argent ribbon.

This variant represents the full version of the coat of arms. In addition, there are two other versions: an abridged version, which is missing part of the details, and a small version, which is one shield. The standard for the coat of arms is its textual description (blazon), rather than a drawing, which, in strict compliance with the arrangement of armorial elements and figures, allows for the creation of artistic interpretations of the coat of arms that are equal in terms of the law.

== Symbolism ==
The cannon on the coat of arms of Smolensk is understood to symbolise the city's long and distinguished military history, its location near the border and the strength of its military defences.

The bird of paradise, Gamayun, is interpreted as a symbol of happiness and aspiration for it. It represents wealth, prosperity, and greatness; peace and rebirth after wars; aspiration to the highest ideals; "precious experience and culture of the people, allowing to look fearlessly into the future, to foresee it"; and warns of danger. Its symbolism is "both protection and rebirth," "allegory of the unity of the human mind, forces of nature, and elements." In certain heraldic sources, Gamayun is erroneously conflated with the phoenix, which is depicted as rising from the flames, symbolising eternal rebirth and renewal.

The argent (white) colour of the shield is traditionally associated with the western Russian lands. Furthermore, white is regarded as the highest colour in Christianity, representing military valour, peace, purity of aspirations, good neighbourliness and happiness.

The Monomakh's Cap serves to indicate that Smolensk was the capital of a Grand Principality and also to remind us of the reign of Vladimir Monomakh in the city. The scarlet banners, decorated with the monograms of Alexander I and the imperial crown, commemorate the valour of the city's inhabitants during the Patriotic War of 1812. The St. George ribbon serves to indicate that Smolensk is a fortress city that distinguished itself in battles. The golden five-pointed star indicates that Smolensk has been designated a Hero City. The ribbons of the Order of Lenin and the Order of the Patriotic War of the 1st class attest to the city's honours.

The motto refers both to the moral strength of the Smolensk warriors and to the fortress wall of Smolensk. The curls of the ribbon on which the motto is inscribed symbolise loyalty to tradition.

== Early Smolensk symbols ==
In order to understand the historical evolution of the coat of arms of Smolensk, it is essential to examine the pivotal moments in the city's history that have shaped its symbolism. The first mention of the city dates back to 862. From 1127 onwards, it served as the capital of the Smolensk principality. In 1404, the process of integrating Smolensk into the Grand Duchy of Lithuania was concluded. In 1514, it was incorporated into the Grand Duchy of Moscow. In 1611, Smolensk was annexed by the Polish-Lithuanian Commonwealth. It remained under their rule until 1654, when it finally became part of the Russian Tsardom. During the Russian Empire, the city served as the administrative centre of Smolensk Governorate. In Soviet times and in modern Russia, it is the administrative centre of the Smolensk Oblast.

=== Ancient seals ===
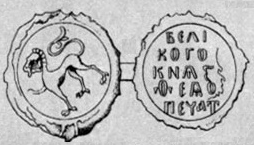
"Grand Duke Fedor's seal". 13th century

There is a certain connection between the princely seals and the city's coats of arms. The seals of the princes of Smolensk frequently depicted saints corresponding to their Christian names. For example, Vyacheslav Yaroslavich's (1054–1057) seal depicted Saint Mercurius. Rostislav Mstislavich's (1127–1167) depicted Saint Michael and Saint Theodore (in accordance with his father's name). Vladimir Rurikovich's (1214–1219) depicted Saints Demetrius of Thessaloniki and Basil of Caesarea (in accordance with his father's name). Mstislav Davidovich's (1219–1230) depicted Saint Theodore. Rostislav Mstislavich's seal (1230–1232) depicted Saints Boris and Gleb, Gleb Rostislavich's (1270–1277) - Saint Gleb, and Alexander Glebovich's (1297–1313) - Saint Alexander.

Additionally, a seal bearing the image of a beast (lion) to the left and the inscription "Grand Duke Fedor's seal" on the reverse is also known. A. B. Lakier posits that the shape of the lion with spread claws and its position of the tail, bent to the back, indicate a foreign origin for this emblem. Lakier attributed the seal to Mstislav Davidovich, who was baptised Fyodor (1219–1230). It is now believed to be the seal of Theodore Rostislavich (1279–1297).

=== Coats of Arms of Theodore Smolensky ===
In the lists of Ulrich of Richenthal's Chronicle of the Council of Constance there are two coats of arms of "Duke Fedor of Smolensk in Red Rus" ("der Hertzog Fedur von Schmolentzgi in Roten Rüssen"), who arrived at the Council of Constance in 1414–1418 as part of a delegation headed by Kiev Metropolitan Gregory Tsamblak. It is commonly accepted that he was the son of Prince Yuri Svyatoslavich of Smolensk, who fled with his father to Moscow following the annexation of Smolensk to the Grand Duchy of Lithuania in 1404. He served in Novgorod between 1406 and 1412. Subsequently, he "departed to Nemtsi," from which he could reach the cathedral. This version is corroborated by an inscription in the Augsburg edition of the Chronicle of 1536.

In the second manuscript edition of the Chronicle (the so-called "Constance Manuscript of the Chronicle") of 1464, both coats of arms are presented in a side-by-side format. The first coat of arms is a divided escutcheon, displaying a blue marching lion on or, and an or marching lion on blue. In the initial printed edition of the chronicle in 1483, only this coat of arms remains, accompanied by a clear signature above it: "von dem Durchleuchtigen Fürsten / Herzog Fodur von Schmolenzgen in Roten Reussen". This coat of arms is relatively underrepresented in Russian-language heraldic literature. Prince Fyodor Yurievich is also associated with the seal discovered in Torzhok, which depicts a beast on the left.

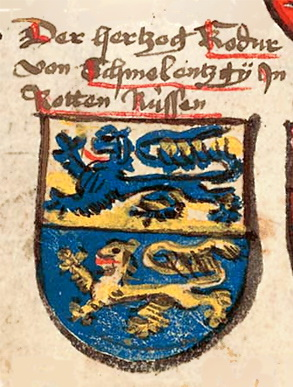
The first drawing from the 1464 manuscript Chronicle of the Council of Constance

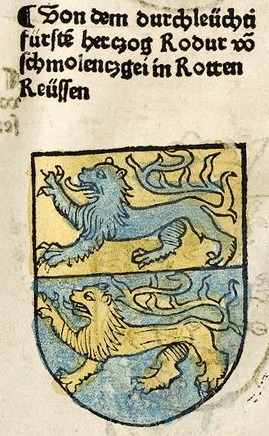
Drawing from the 1483 printed edition of the Chronicles of the Council of Constance

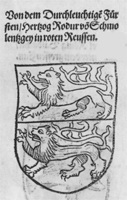
Drawing from a later printed edition of the Chronicles of the Cathedral of Constance

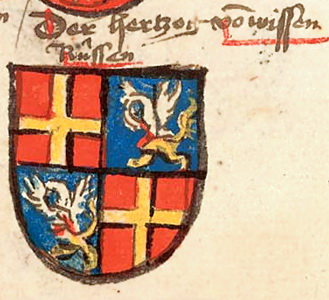
The second drawing from the 1464 manuscript Chronicles of the Council of Constance

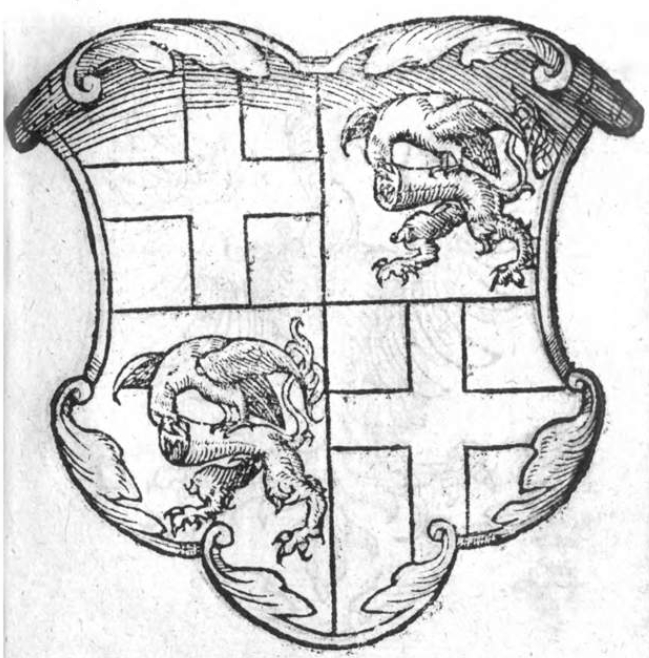
Drawing from the Polish Armorial by Marcus Ambrosius of 1570

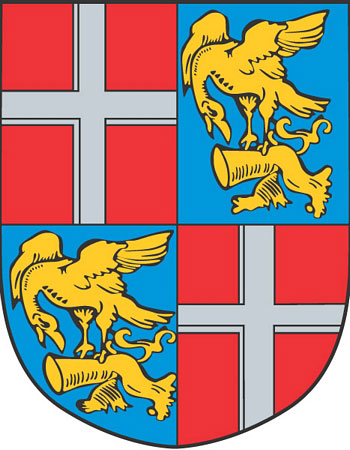
Modern drawing

The second coat of arms depicted in the Chronicle is a four-part shield. In the first and fourth quarters, an or greek cross on a red background is displayed. In the second and third quarters, an azure field is occupied by an argent eagle perched on the severed hind half of a yellow lion. The inscription above the second coat of arms is not entirely legible: "der Hertzog von Wissen Rüssen". The same coat of arms was printed as the coat of arms of the Smolensk land in the Polish Armorial by Mark Ambrosius in 1570 (at a time when Smolensk was already part of the Russian Tsardom). In modern literature, the assertion is made that the crosses on this coat of arms are white in colour, without citing the primary source. V. S. Drachuk proposes that the white crosses on the red field represent the religious Order of Saint John of Jerusalem, of which Fyodor Smolensky may have become a member while residing abroad.

=== Early coats of arms ===
A coat of arms of the Smolensk land, which shows a bear walking, is in both the 1430s Armorial Lyncenich, kept in Brussels, and the Codex Bergshammar armorial of the 15th century.

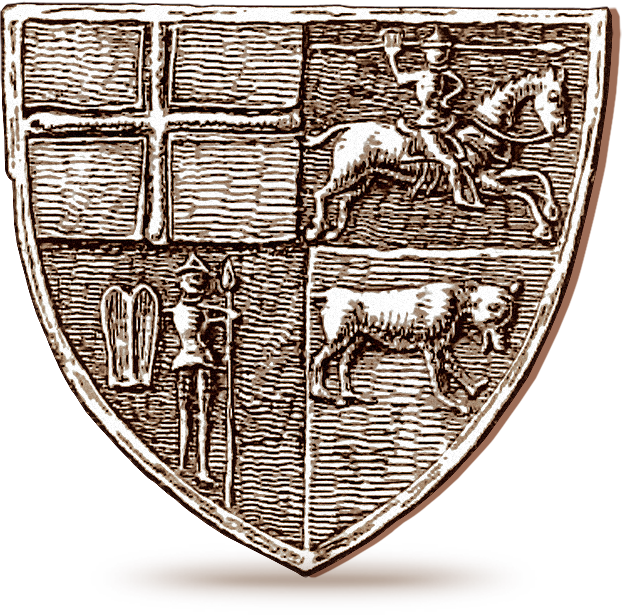
Coat of arms of the Smolensk land from the seal of Grand Duke Vytautas of Lithuania. 1404

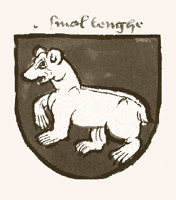
Coat of arms of the Smolensk Land from the Armorial Gymnich (Lyncenich) book, 1430s

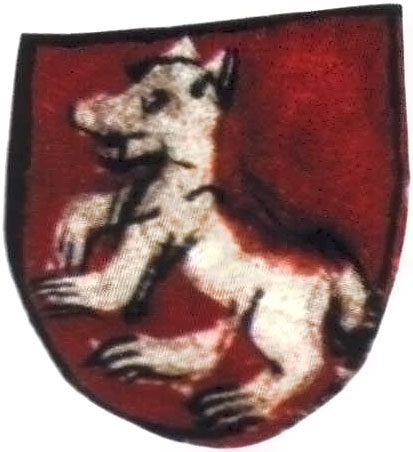
Coat of arms of Smolensk land from the Codex Bergshammar armorial of the 15th century

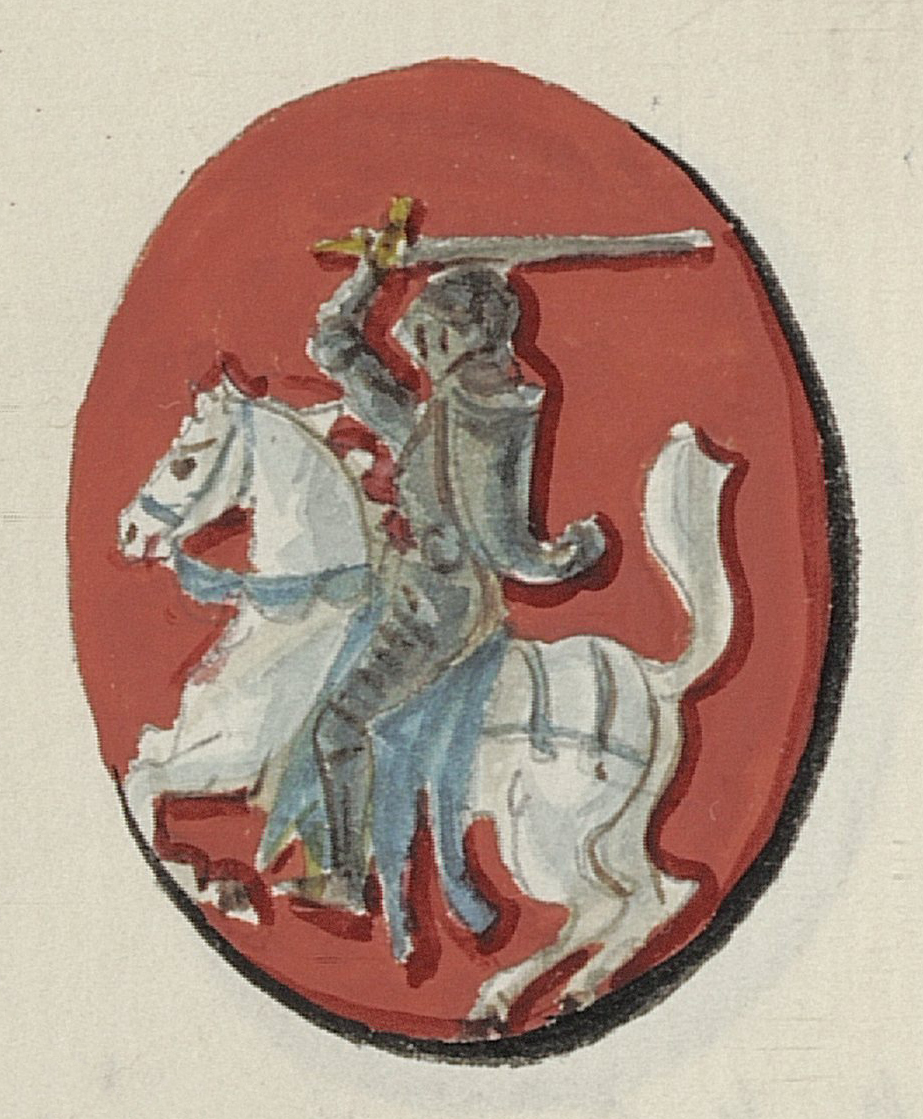
Erroneous image of the coat of arms of Smolensk from the Polish armorial of the late 19th century - Pahonia

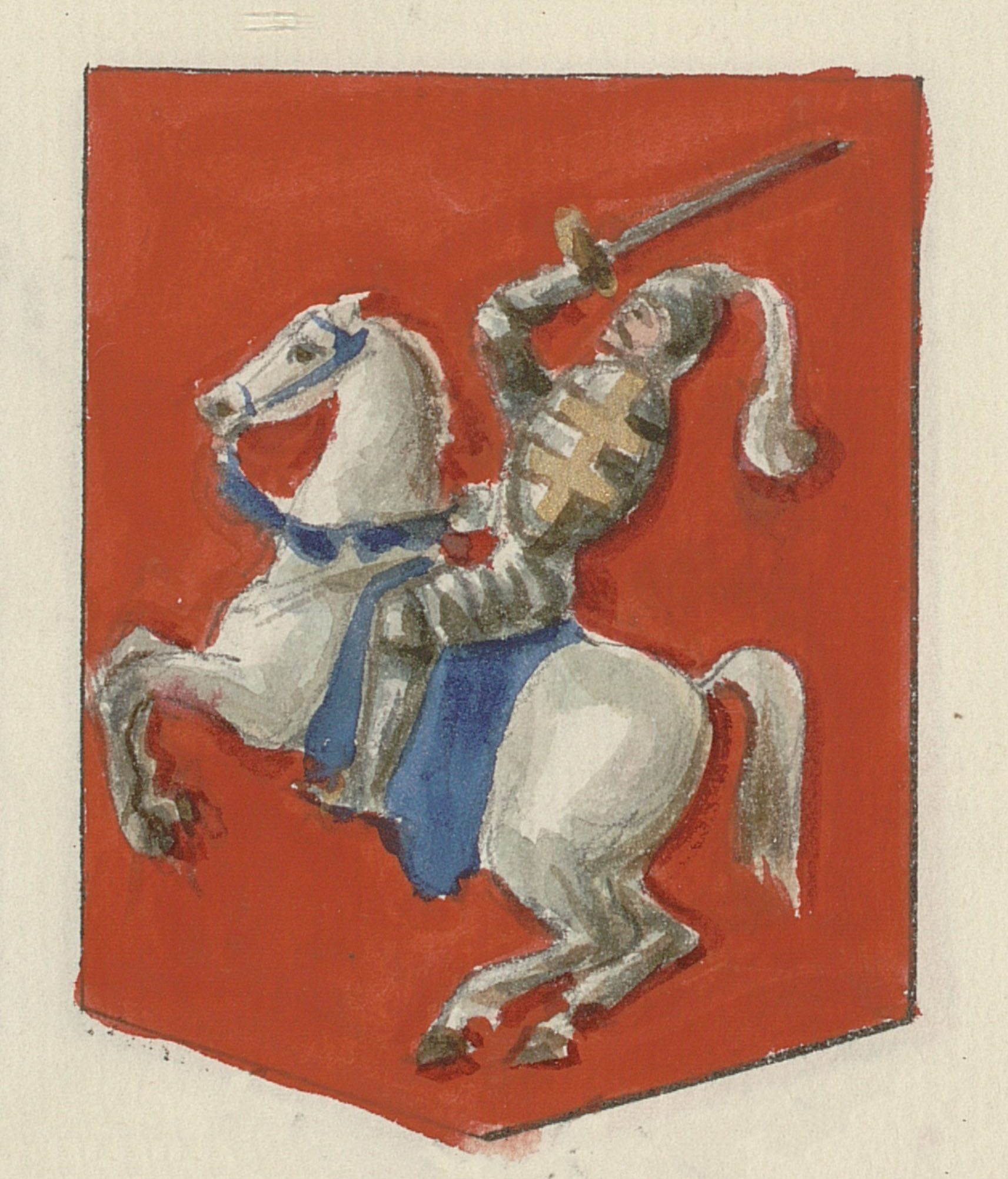
Another version from the same source

In Bartosz Paprocki's armorial The heraldic arms of the Polish knighthood (1584), it is stated that the city of Smolensk, which was part of the Grand Duchy of Lithuania, as well as a number of other cities, usually used Pahonia on the flag with the coat of arms of the principality. However, S. V. Dumin considered these data to be of questionable reliability. Pogonia is also depicted in proximity to Smolensk on a map of Russia and Siberia, created in Europe on the basis of Gerardus Mercator's map of 1554 and held in the Russian National Library. In his manuscript Insignia seu clenodia Regis et Regni Poloniae (1464–1480), Jan Dlugosz provides a description of the coat of arms of Smolensk Land as part of the Grand Duchy of Lithuania: on the argent feild, there is a red flag with three ends in column, the flagpole and the final in the form of a cross are golden. In the manuscript of the second half of the 16th century, Stemmata Polonica from the Bibliothèque de l'Arsenal in Paris, Dlugosz's description is accompanied by an illustration.

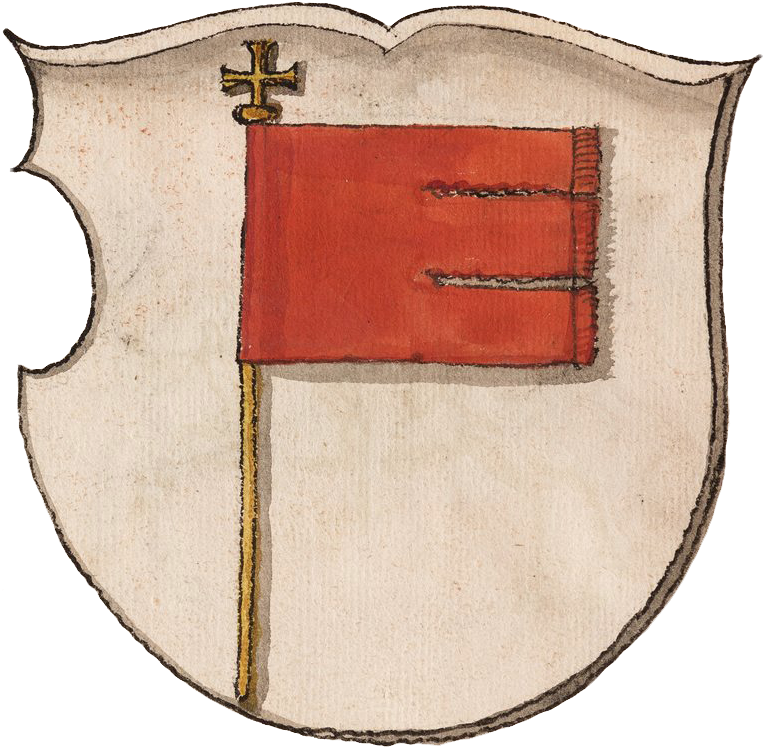
Coat of arms of Smolensk Voivodeship from the manuscript Stemmata Polonica of the second half of the 16th century

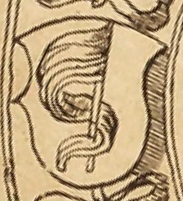
Coat of Arms from the Polish edition of the Statute of the Grand Duchy of Lithuania of 1588

Drawing of the coat of arms of the voivodship from the seal of the Grand Duke of Lithuania Stanisław August

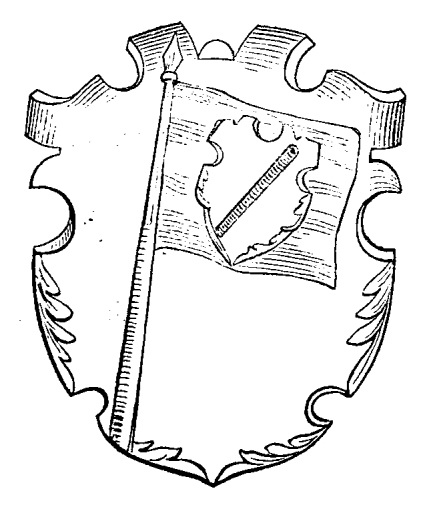
Coat of Arms of the Smolensk Voivodeship from The heraldic arms of the Polish knighthood by Bartosz Paprocki, 1584

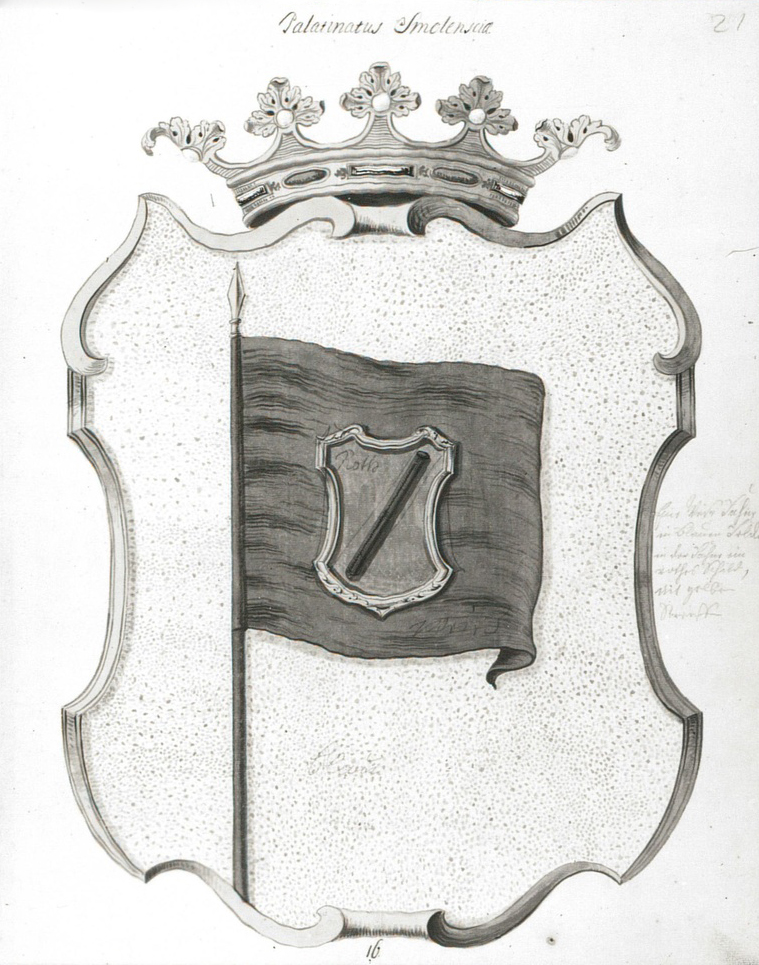
Watercolour sketch for the decoration of the Senatorial Hall of the Royal Castle in Warsaw, circa 1720

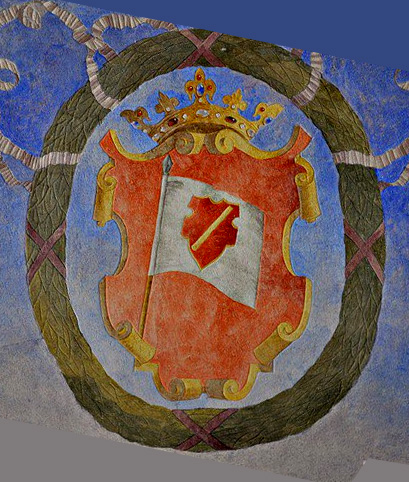
In the Embassy Hall (Chamber of Deputies) of the Royal Castle in Warsaw

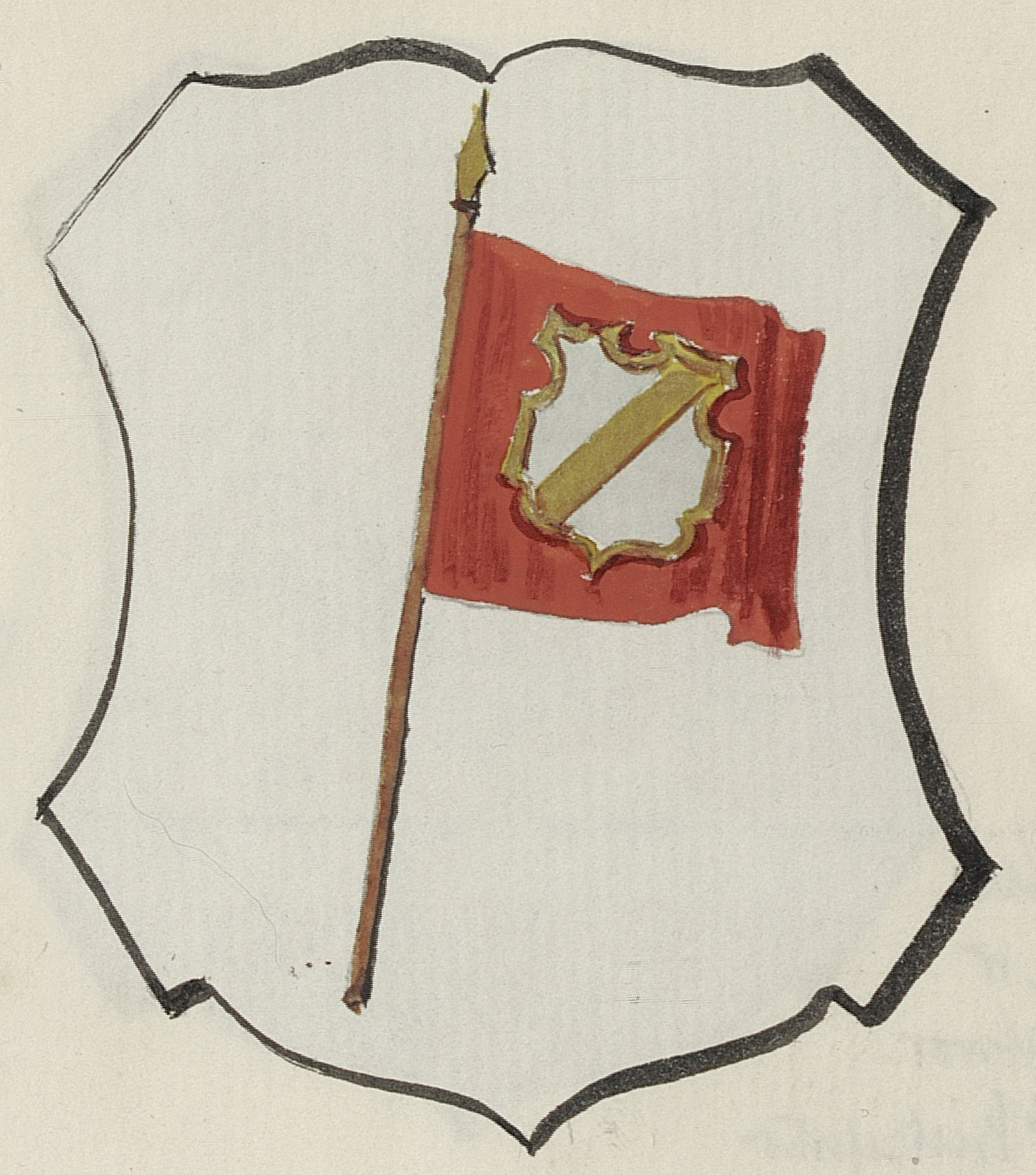
From the Polish armorial of the end of the 19th century

Modern drawing of the coat of arms of the voivodship

In the 1584 The heraldic arms of the Polish knighthood, the coat of arms of the titular Smolensk Voivodeship of the Polish-Lithuanian Commonwealth (at that time Smolensk was under the rule of the Russian Tsardom) is described. The shield displays a red flag (banner) with a handle, and on the banner is a grey shield with a golden rod (staff, beam) lying aslant, resembling in shape an ordinary rod. It is probable that this coat of arms is a development of the previous one. Its meaning and origin remain unknown. S. V. Dumin noted that although "a 'grey' field is not common in traditional heraldry, however, in provincial heraldry of the Polish-Lithuanian Commonwealth this colour is sometimes found in descriptions (particularly of family coats of arms)". He proposed that the field of the shield itself and the field of the shield placed on the flag could have been argent, but in this case the placement of the or staff on the argent field would contravene the rules of heraldry, so the "grey" colour could possibly have been black. The coat of arms of the Smolensk Voivodeship, decorated with a crown, is on display in the Senatorial and Embassy Halls of the Royal Castle in Warsaw. In the Embassy Hall, the coat of arms is displayed with other colours: a red shield with an argent flag, on which there is a red shield with an or beam.

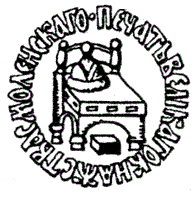
"Seal of the Grand Duchy of Smolensk" on the great seal of Ivan IV the Terrible of 1583.

The 1583 Great Seal of Ivan IV the Terrible depicts the titular "Seal of the Grand Duchy of Smolensk" in the form of a grand-ducal throne, on which the Monomakh's Cap is placed, with a footstool next to it. This subject was later characteristic of the Tver coat of arms. A. B. Lakier postulated this may have occurred either "according to the symbol generally accepted for all former grand duchies" or simply due to a mistake on the part of the master, given that the grand duchy of Tver was assigned the emblem of the Yaroslavl coat of arms – a bear – on the great seal. However, N. A. Soboleva noted that it is not accurate to describe this as a case of confusion, given that no earlier sources are known.

On 4 November 1611, when Smolensk was under the rule of the Polish-Lithuanian Commonwealth, its king Sigismund III granted the city of Smolensk, together with the Magdeburg rights, a coat of arms: Archangel Michael in iron lats and with a bare sword in his right hand, trampling with his feet on a defeated winged serpent (dragon) on a gules field. The use of religious themes is typical of the heraldic art of Sigismund III's reign. According to S. V. Dumin, the composition, which represents the victory over the forces of evil, was intended to symbolise the return of the city to the Polish-Lithuanian state. This is the first reliably known description of the coat of arms of Smolensk. This coat of arms seems to be the first coat of arms of a city (not a land) on the territory of modern Russia. N.A. Murzakevich pointed out that the charter on granting the coat of arms to Smolensk was promulgated only in 1632. Nevertheless, according to S.V. Dumin, the coat of arms was spread in Smolensk, as the charter of Sigismund III was executed according to all the rules, entered into the Lithuanian Metrica and then confirmed under Wladislaw IV. The archive of the Smolensk magistrate burnt down during the Patriotic War of 1812, and the drawing of the coat of arms did not survive.

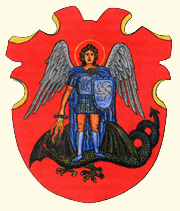
Modern reconstruction of the Smolensk coat of arms of 1611

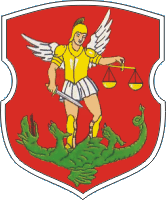
Another modern reconstruction of this coat of arms

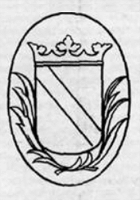
Seal of the voivodship of Smolensk. 1668

Among the documents in the file on the nobility of the Przysiecki family, who in the 17th century owned estates in the Smolensk Voivodeship, there is a document issued on 19 March 1668 by the Smolensk standard-bearer Y. A. Khrapovitsky. The seal is inscribed in Polish with the words "Seal of the Smolensk Voivodeship" and depicts a crowned shield bearing a stylised, close to the common nobility crown Iberian style escutcheon of the bend on the right. The escutcheton is surrounded by decorative leaves (palm branches). In accordance with the hypothesis put forth by S. V. Dumin, the coat of arms depicted on this seal may be associated with the coat of arms of the Smolensk Voivodeship, which features a rod. This could have undergone a transformation, evolving from a rod to a bend, or conversely, the bend could have been erroneously interpreted as a rod.

== History of the modern coat of arms ==
=== Hypotheses of origin ===
The modern coat of arms of Smolensk, which depicts the mythical bird of paradise Gamayun sitting on a cannon, is reliably known from the second half of the 17th century, when Smolensk became part of the Russian Tsardom (1654). However, the name Gamayun is not mentioned in all sources of heraldry. Instead, it is often simply referred to as the bird of paradise. In the earliest representations of the bird, it is depicted as legless and sometimes also wingless.

There is no data on the origin of the bird of paradise depicted on a cannon on the Smolensk coat of arms. It can be assumed that the cannon symbolises the border position of Smolensk, the frequent sieges in the 14th-17th centuries and the strong armament of the city fortress. The bird on the cannon could be interpreted as a warning of the approaching enemy. The word Gamayun is a distortion of the name of the eastern mythical Huma (Homa) Bird, which, according to numerous legends and beliefs, was able to foretell the chosen person of dominion. This is quite an apt symbolism for the coat of arms. Since 1992, the Huma Bird has been depicted on the coat of arms of Uzbekistan.

Some Russian Empire heraldists attempted to elucidate the leglessness of the bird depicted on the Smolensk coat of arms through the lens of the historical confrontation between the Russian Tsardom and the Polish-Lithuanian Commonwealth over Smolensk. According to A. B. Lakier, Smolensk could have been perceived by these states as a "coveted and unattainable object," akin to a mythical bird of paradise. The leglessness was perceived by him as "shooting" of the gamayun, which was nevertheless obtained by Russian arms. According to P. P. Winkler, the Gamayun is a symbol of Poland, whose legs were shot off by a Russian cannon.

According to modern ideas about the origin of the mythical image of the bird Gamayun, its leglessness arose as a result of the prevailing misconception in the 16th-18th centuries about the leglessness of representatives of the biological family of birds of paradise living in New Guinea. They were described in Russian books as follows: "with a majesty greater than a sparrow, a tail of seven spans, legs and wings [they] do not have."

Н. A. Soboleva draws attention to the similarity of the paradise bird Gamayun on the early Smolensk coat of arms with the images of paradise birds in European emblem books, including in the Symbola et Emblemata commissioned by Peter the Great in 1705. The images are accompanied by such mottos as Latin: Semper Sublimis, lit. 'Always tall', Latin: Terrae commercia nescit, lit. 'Does not know the affairs of the earth', Latin: Altiora petit, lit. 'He seeks higher things', Latin: Nil terrestre, lit. 'Nothing earthly'. The image of a cannon is also quite typical. On one of the emblems there is even a bird - an eagle; this image was used as the coat of arms of Voronezh in the 1730 Banner Armorial.

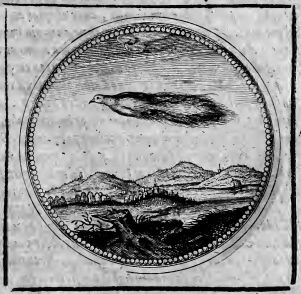
Bird of Paradise emblem with the motto in Latin: Terrae commercia nescit, lit. 'Does not know the affairs of the earth' from the 1654 edition of the book Symbolorum et emblematum... by Joachim Camerarius

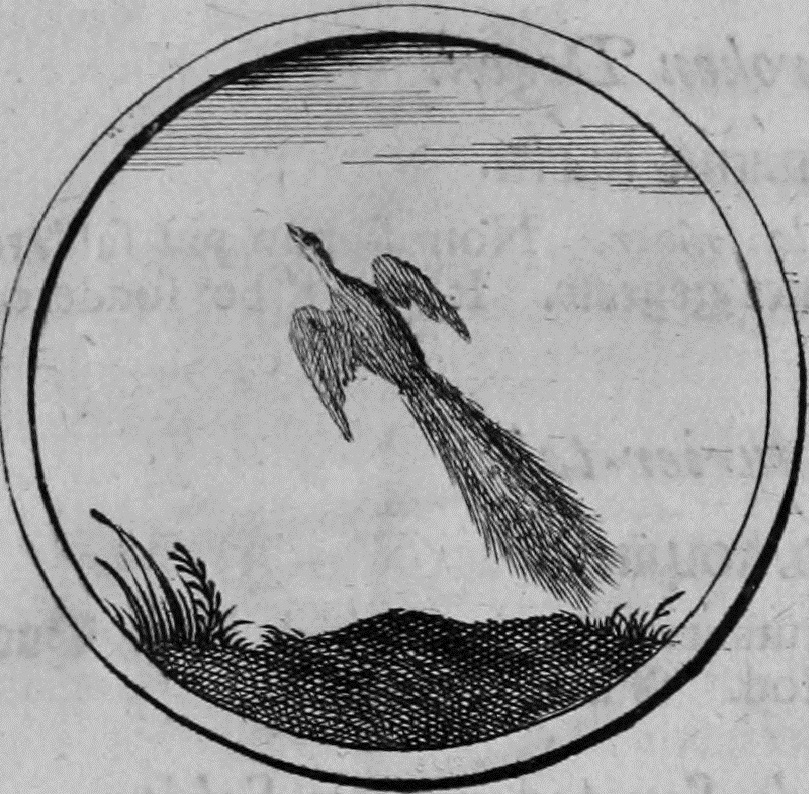
Bird of Paradise emblem with the motto in Latin: Altiora petit, lit. 'He seeks higher things' from the book Symbola et Emblemata, 1705

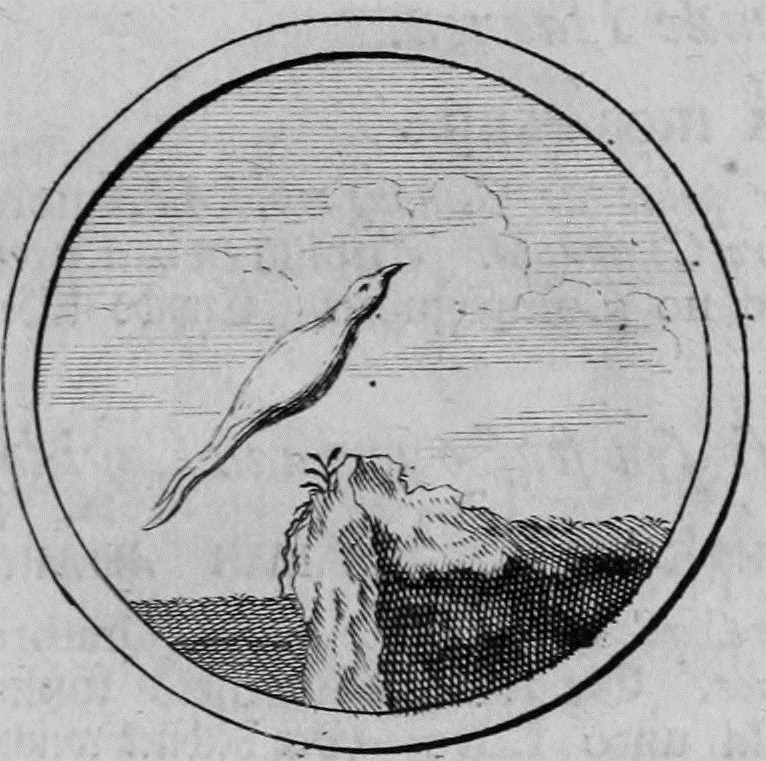
Emblem of the Bird of Paradise with the motto in Latin: Nil terrestre, lit. 'Nothing earthly' from the book Symbola et Emblemata of 1705

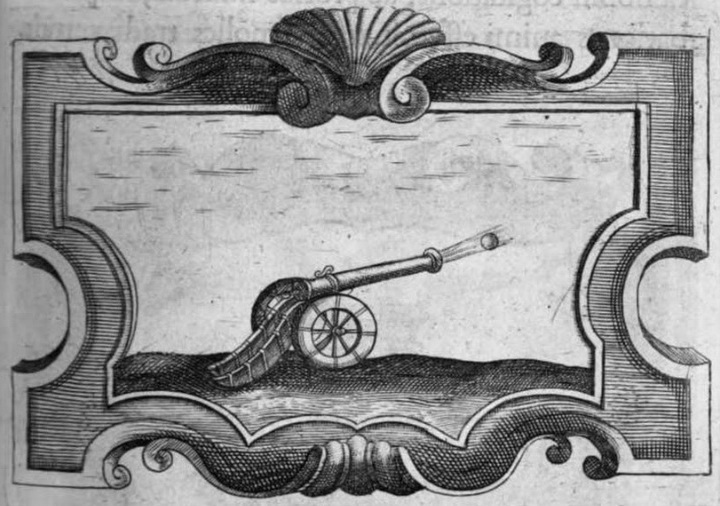
Emblem with a cannon from the 1682 edition of the book Symbola heroica... by Silvester Petra Sancta

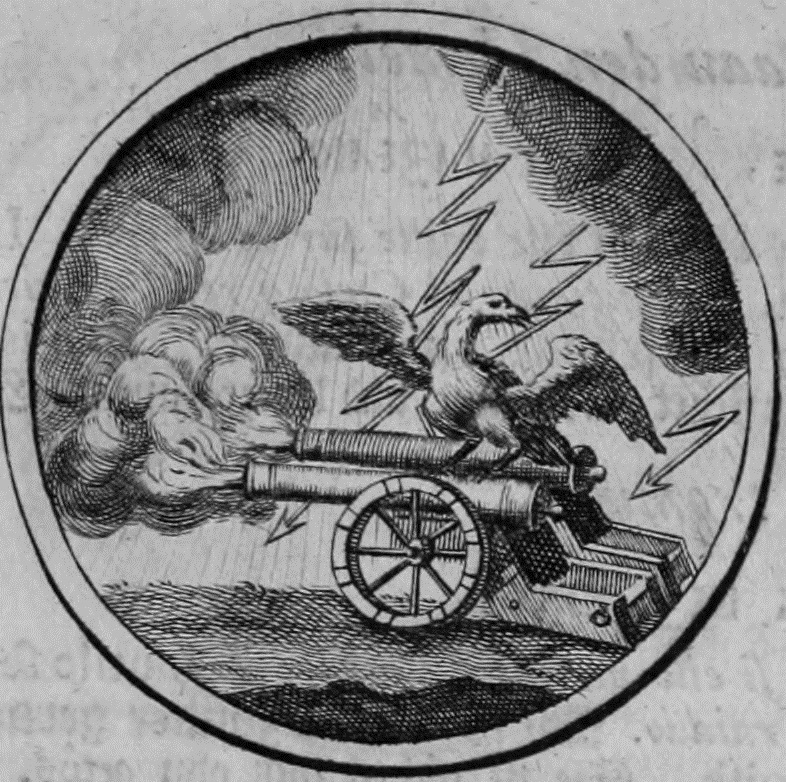
Emblem Eagle flying under lightning and cannon fire with the motto in Latin: Neutra timet, lit. 'He is not afraid of either' from the book Symbola et Emblemata, 1705

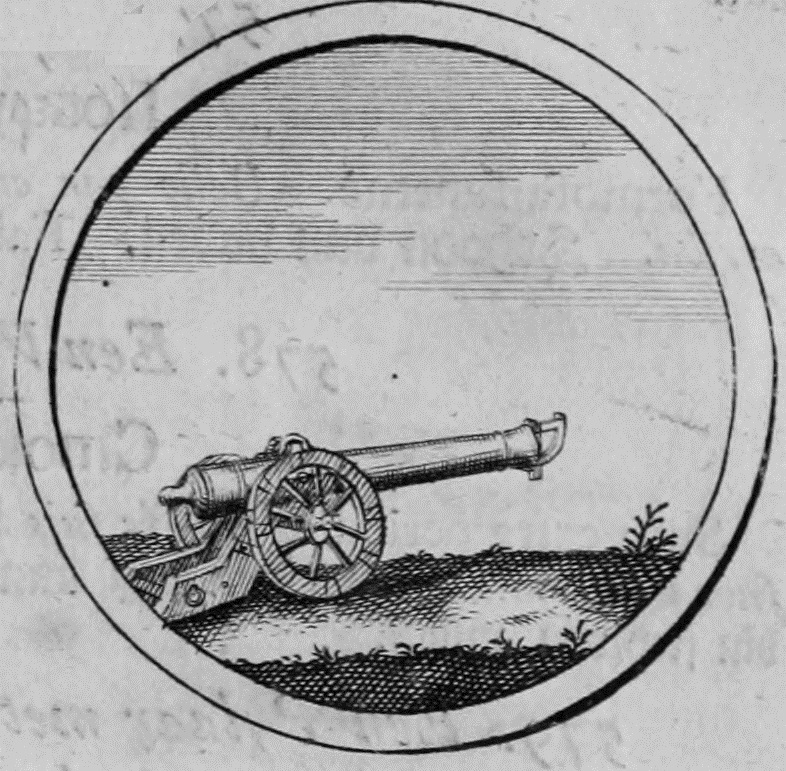
Emblem Cannon with a quadrant with the motto in Latin: Non solum Armis, lit. 'Not only with weapons' from the book Symbola et Emblemata, 1705

The antiquity of the modern Smolensk coat of arms was for some time presumed to be evidenced by the copper Smolensk pulo, a Smolensk coin dated 1387-1404 bearing an image of a bird on a cannon. This coin was first published in the numismatic table of the Göttingen Library in 1777. Images of the pulo were presented in a number of works, and in the final quarter of the 19th century it was included in the collections of numismatists. However, in 1974, historian I. G. Spassky proved that the Göttingen drawing was the result of an erroneous reconstruction of the image of a winged and tailed harpy (siren) and the inscription "poulo Moscow" on the defective Moscow pulo, and that the coins in the collections were in fact fakes. This conclusion was subsequently corroborated by the findings of an expert examination of the metal used in the coins.

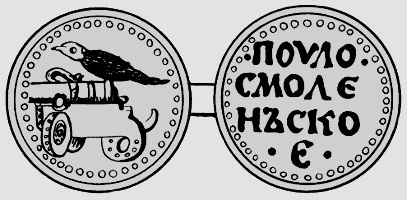
Drawing of the Smolensk pulo of the late 14th century from the tables of the Göttingen Library, now considered a hoax

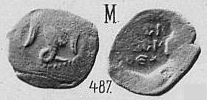
Moscow pulo during the reign of Vasily II the Dark or Ivan III

Another piece of the Moscow pulo

In addition, N. N. Speransov claimed in 1974 that the cannon with the bird of paradise was displayed on the banners of Smolensk regiments at the Battle of Grunwald in 1410, without citing any sources. In contrast, G. B. Karamzin also provided an unsubstantiated account in 1961, stating that the Smolensk regiments at the Battle of Grunwald in 1410 had red banners with white crosses.

The resemblance between the coat of arms and a cannon, and the coat of arms of Fyodor of Smolensk with a bird and half of a lion, is noteworthy. V. K. Lukomsky, V. S. Drachuk and G. V. Razhnyov proposed that the latter coat of arms may have been distorted due to religious considerations: allegedly the Catholic Church "for many years called cannons an instrument of the devil and officially cursed them", and the image of the bird Gamayun was inappropriate as it originated from the image of the "Muslim" mythical Huma bird.

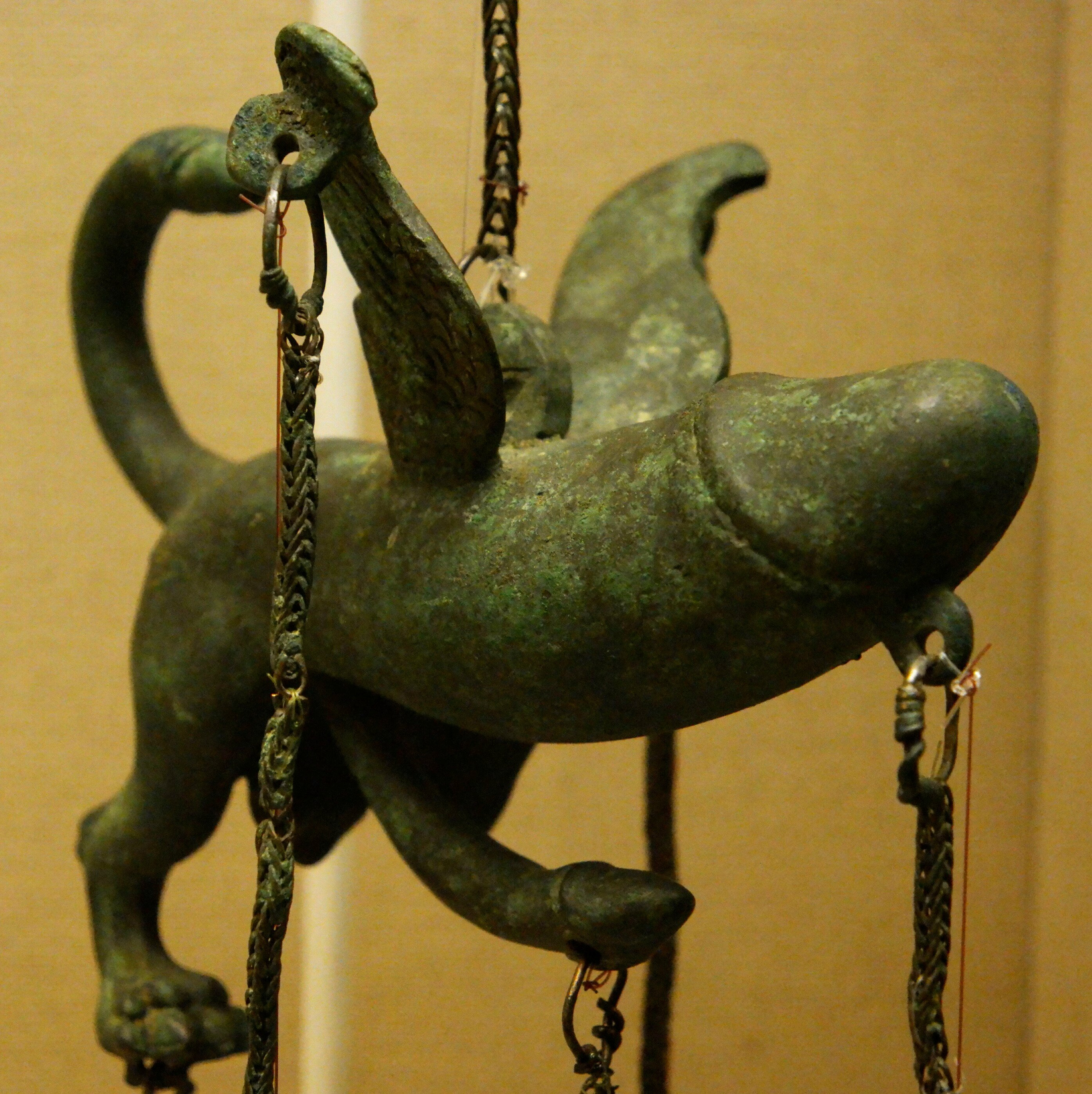
Ancient Roman tintinnabulum from the 1st century A.D. British Museum

There is a hypothesis about the origin of the princely coats of arms from personal princely seals of the Western type, the choice of which was accidental and had nothing to do with local tradition. As for the Smolensk coat of arms, S.N. Troinitsky and V.B. Shklovsky assumed its origin from a deformed ancient gem (carved stone) depicting a winged phallus used as a princely seal, which could be misinterpreted as a cannon with a bird sitting on it. This hypothesis was challenged by V.K. Lukomsky and O.Y. Neverov.

In a collection of business papers of the 18th-19th centuries, presented by I.V. Pomialovsky at the end of the 19th century to the Society of Lovers of Ancient Writing and published in 1892, there are panegyrics, supposedly translated into Russian in 1682 from the Polish book The Golden Nest. According to them, when Prince Gleb Svyatoslavich received permission from the Lithuanian Grand Duke Vytautas to reign in Smolensk (1392), he "takes a crown on his house kleinot, shows his great birth kleinod, under the crown of the gamayun on the gromada [cannon], perched, the magnanimity of their favours of the Smolensk princes having expressed, as the gromada zuk [rumble, noise] its sound everywhere undresses so also the princedom of Smolensk everywhere glorifies, .... the seal of the princes of Smolensk". G. V. Razhnyov placed considerable trust in this report and considered the date of creation of the Smolensk coat of arms to be 1392. However, a number of researchers, starting with S. N. Troinitsky, did not attach significant importance to these verses. Some doubted the very fact of the presence of cannons in Smolensk at the end of the 14th century, but it seems that this was a reasonable assumption.

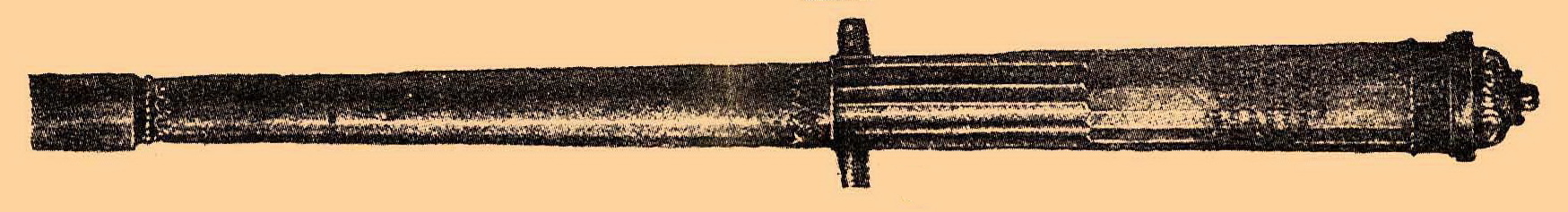
1690 pishchal Gamayun

The assumption of S. N. Troinitsky is that the cannon on the coat of arms of Smolensk could be a specific Smolensk cannon with the name "Gamayun." At that time, cannons were often named in honour of real and mythical animals. For example, the 6-pound pishchal Gamayun cast by Martyan Osipov on 29 July (8 August) 1690, which is currently located by the building of the Kremlin Arsenal, depicts a bird, which resembles bird Gamayun from the early images of the Smolensk coat of arms. In this context, Y. L. Vorotnikov observed that, thereby, we have a somewhat genuine image of the Smolensk coat of arms.

=== In Russian Tsardom ===
Nevertheless, the earliest authentic mention of the Smolensk emblem is the seal of the Principality of Smolensk (titular), with the signature "bird gam[ayun]", attached to the letter of Prince Fyodor Kurakin to Prince Nikita Ivanovich Odoyevsky and his companions from Smolensk from 28 June (8 July) 1664. This letter concerns the sending to them of two robbers – Don Cossacks. Subsequently, the coat of arms of Tsar Alexei Mikhailovich, which was used between 1666 and 1678, incorporates the Smolensk coat of arms. The cannon on it is depicted without a gun carriage.

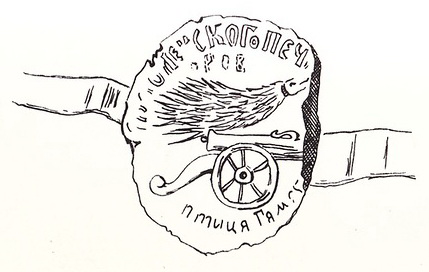
Seal of the Principality of Smolensk in 1664

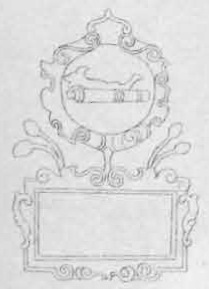
Coat of arms of the Principality of Smolensk on the armorial banner of Tsar Alexei Mikhailovich in 1666-1678

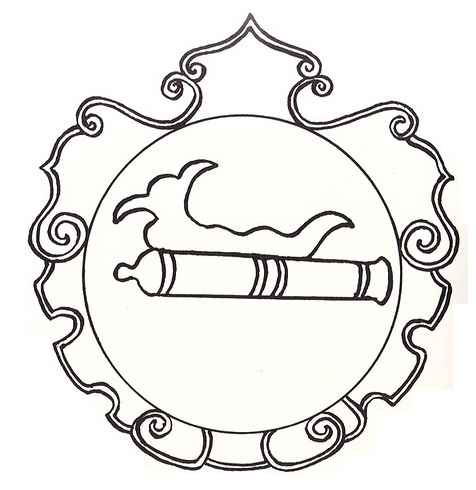
Contemporary drawing

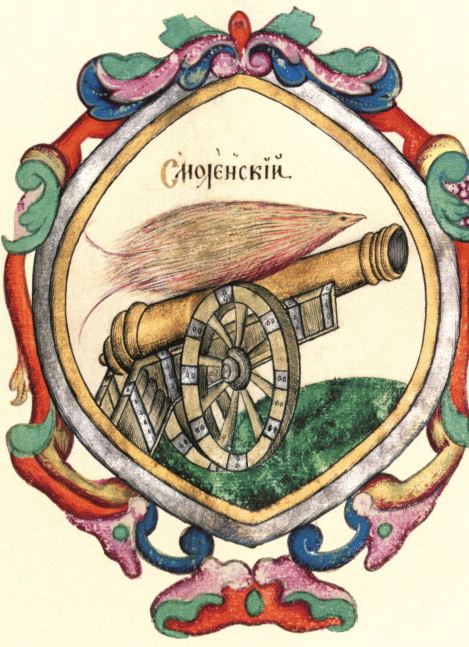
Coat of arms of the Principality of Smolensk from the big Titularnik of 1672

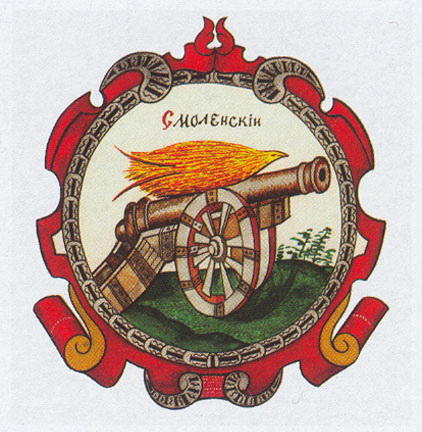
Coat of arms of the Principality of Smolensk from the small Titularnik of 1672

In 1672, during the reign of Alexei Mikhailovich, the "Great Sovereign Book, or the Root of Russian Sovereigns" was compiled, also known as the "Tsar's Titular Book". This is often referred to as the first Russian armorial. A smaller version of the titular book was also produced for Tsarevich Fyodor Alekseevich. They contained the emblems of 33 lands, the names of which were included in the tsar's title, among them the emblem of the principality of Smolensk. The Gamayun depicted in these drawings appears to resemble a "fluffy porcupine".

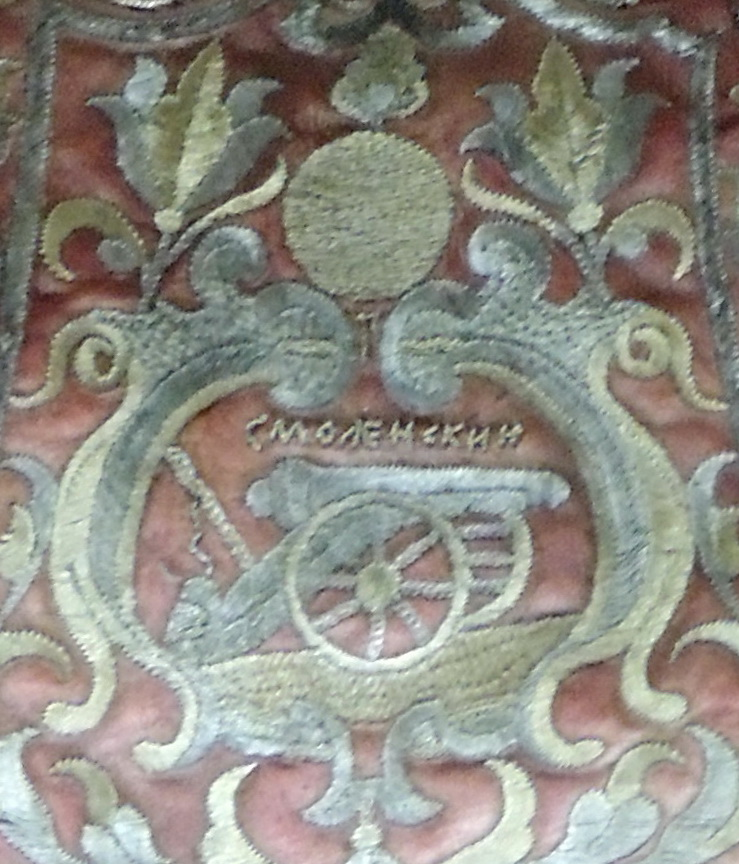
Title emblem of the Principality of Smolensk on the saidak quiverof Tsar Alexei Mikhailovich. Master Prokofiy Andreev. 1673

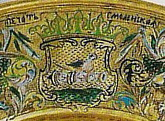
Seal of the Principality of Smolensk from a photograph of Tsar Alexei Mikhailovich's plate in 1675

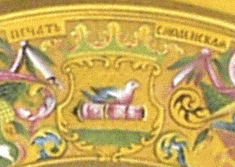
Drawing of the seal. 19th century

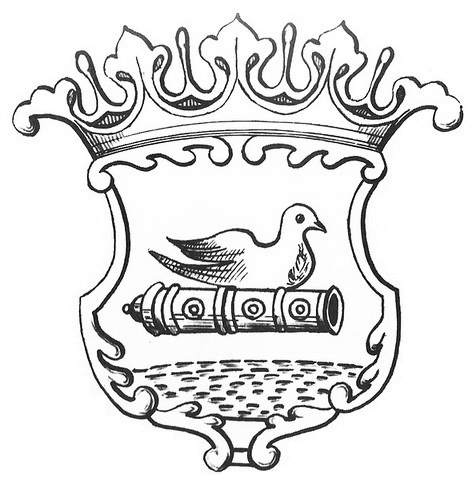
Drawing of the seal. 19th century

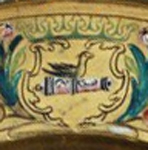
Coat of arms of the Principality of Smolensk from a plate presented by Tsaritsa Natalia Kirillovna to Tsarevich Alexei Petrovich in 1694

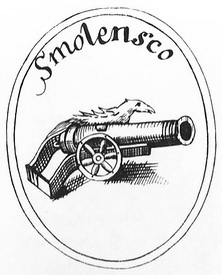
Seal of the Principality of Smolensk from the diary of I.G. Korb of 1698-1699

The Smolensk coat of arms, along with those of other titular lands, is depicted on several other sources from the latter part of the 17th century. The saidak quiver of Tsar Alexei Mikhailovich, crafted by the master Prokofiy Andreyev in 1673, depicts a cannon without a bird. On the gold plate of Tsar Alexei Mikhailovich, dating from 1675, and on the gold plate presented by Tsaritsa Natalia Kirillovna to Tsarevich Alexei Petrovich in 1694, a bird is depicted perched on a cannon without a gun carriage (and wheels). Additionally, the Smolensk coat of arms is depicted on the drawing of the Russian State Seal in the Diary of a Journey to Muscovy (1698–1699), written by the German ambassador I. G. Korb. The bird on the seal is similar to the one depicted on the musket Gamayun (1690), and resembles a legless monitor lizard or lizard. On 5 (15) January 1687, a banner was sent from Smolensk to the razriad regiment. It was created on 8 (18) December 1686 and depicted the state emblem, with the seal of Smolensk below it: "on the brand there is a cannon, on it the bird Gamayun". The influence of the Smolensk coat of arms can be discerned in the images of the bird Gamayun in certain lists of the facial Alphabet Book by Karion Istomin in the 1690s. In the Smolensk emblem depicted on Peter the Great's letters patent to F. V. Shilov, which is held in the Russian State Archive of Documents, the cannon is depicted firing (the cannonball is flying, smoke is coming), but the bird is absent.

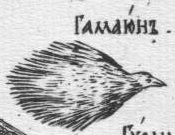
Gamayun in one of the lists of the Alphabet Book by Karion Istomin. 1694

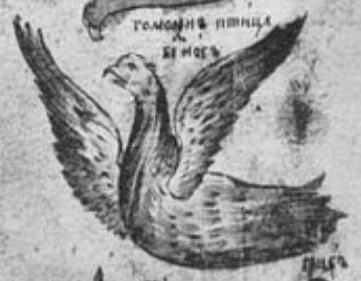
In another list

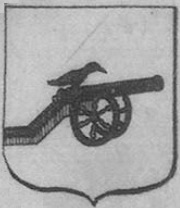
Title coat of arms of the Principality of Smolensk from an atlas published in Amsterdam in 1705-1739

Another version from the same atlas

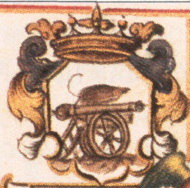
The title coat of arms of the Principality of Smolensk on Peter the Great's letters patent to Count G. I. Golovkin in 1711

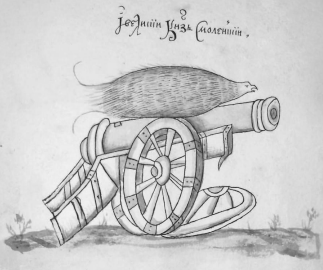
Title coat of arms of the principality of Smolensk from the Old armorial, daubed without paint, according to the title (Russian: «Гербовник старый, малёванный без красок, по титулу»). Early 18th century

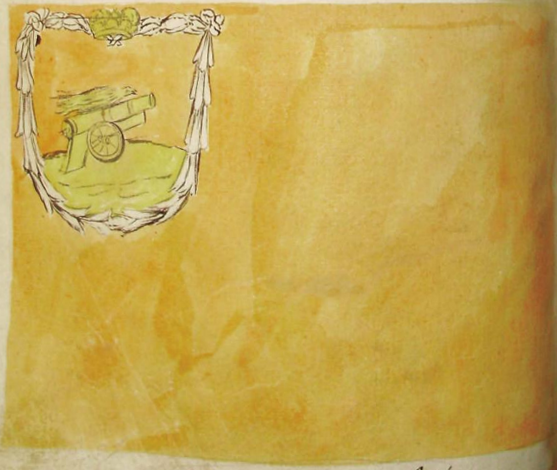
Company banner of the Smolensk infantry regiment of the 1712 pattern. Drawing from the beginning of the 18th century

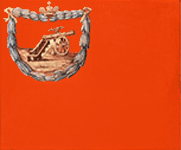
Modern drawing

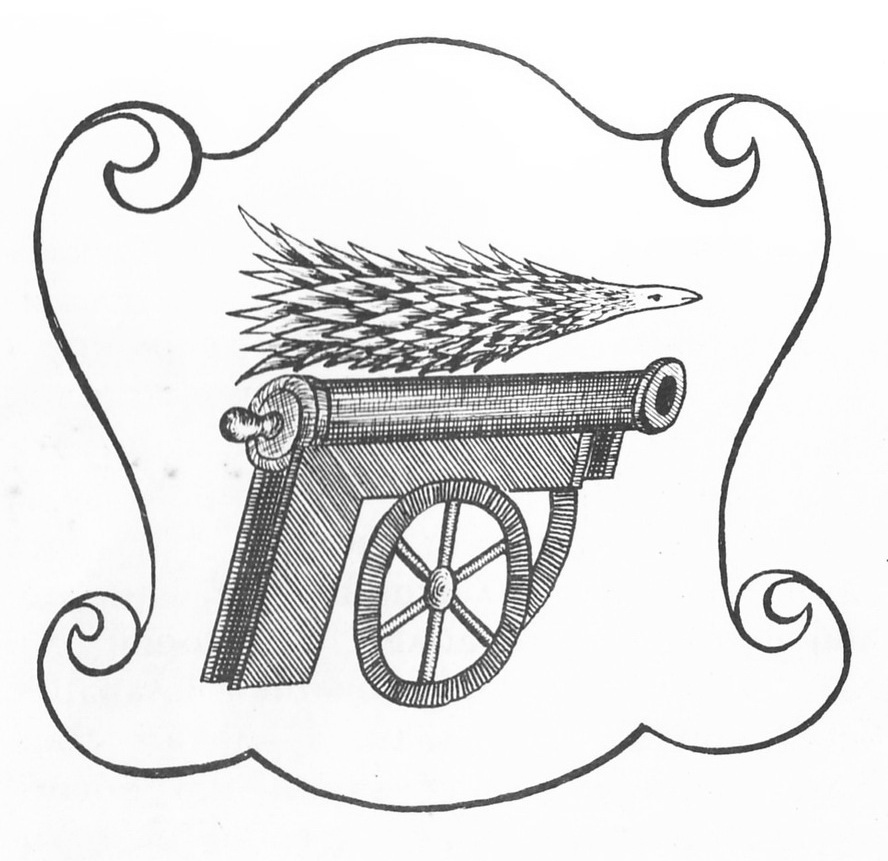
Title coat of arms of the principality of Smolensk on the letters patent to A. Demidov in 1726

=== In the Russian Empire ===
Between 1724 and 1727, F. M. Santi, a fellow of the Master Herold, was engaged in the process of standardising the symbols of Russian cities and regions in accordance with the prevailing European heraldic standards. He distributed a questionnaire to the towns, requesting that they provide descriptions of local features and coats of arms, if any. On 26 September 1725, the Smolensk provincial chancellery replied, enclosing a drawing signed "Seal of the Tsar's Majesty of the Principality of Smolensk" and depicting a cannon with a legless bird of paradise perched upon it, accompanied by the inscription "Bird of Gamayun". Prior to his removal from office and subsequent exile, Santi was able to collate a series of drawings and descriptions of 30 emblems, including the Smolensk emblem: "The field of argent or white has a cannon on a black machine, shackled with gold, ... over that cannon is flying the bird of paradise." In 1730, the Smolensk emblem, executed by Santi, was included in the officially approved Emblem Armorial, intended for the manufacture of banners of regiments, which were assigned to certain cities and named in their honour. Description of the Smolensk coat of arms: "The cannon is black, the machine is yellow, on the cannon is a yellow bird without legs, the field is white - as made by Santii". The cannon, which had previously been oriented to the left (to the right of the viewer), was turned by Santii in the opposite direction in accordance with heraldic rules. The coat of arms was an oval shield encircled by curls and surmounted by a princely crown, thereby signifying that Smolensk was the capital of a Grand Duchy.

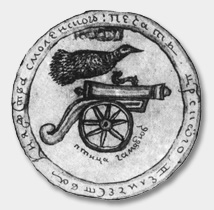
Drawing Seal of the tsar's majesty of the principality of Smolensk. 1725

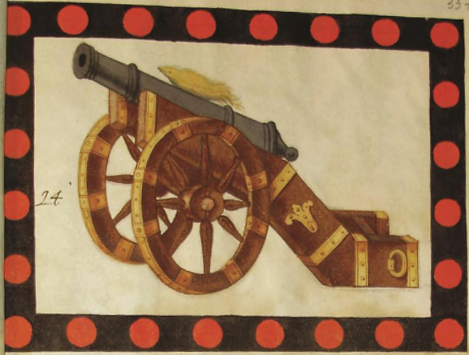
Draft banner of the Smolensk regiments by F. M. Santi, 1724-1727

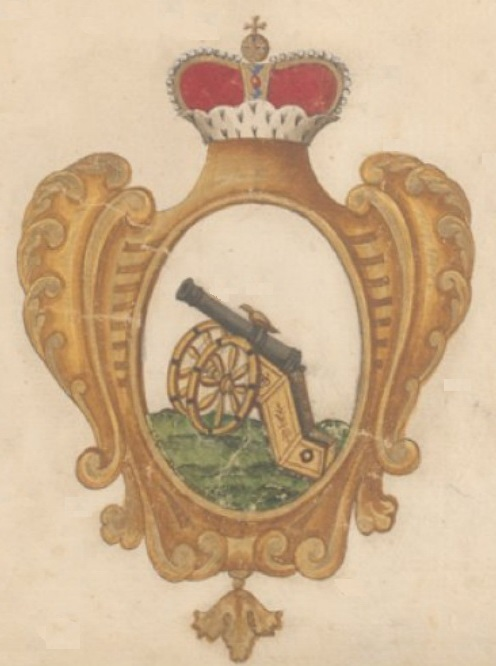
Coat of arms of Smolensk from the Emblem Armorial of 1730 by F. M. Santi

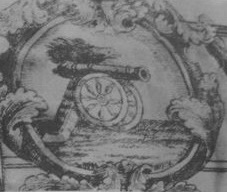
Fragment of engraving Theological Thesis by A. F. Zubov, 1743

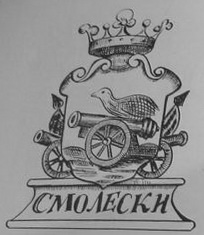
Coat of arms of Smolensk on the printmade Russian State Coat of Arms of the second half of the 18th century

The coat of arms of the city of Smolensk was approved during the reign of Catherine II on 10 (21) October 1780, under the Master Herald A. A. Volkov. This coat of arms was also used as the coat of arms of the Smolensk viceroyalty: "in a silver field is a black cannon on a golden carriage, and on the cannon [sits] the bird of paradise". The cannon was depicted standing on green ground. In the majority of the drawings, the bird of paradise was still depicted legless. The earliest known illustration with legs is in the book The Newest Land Description of the Russian Empire by Y. F. Zyablovsky in 1818. Shield decorations were not employed during this period.

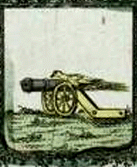
Coat of arms of the city of Smolensk and the Smolensk Viceroyalty in 1780. Drawing from 1794

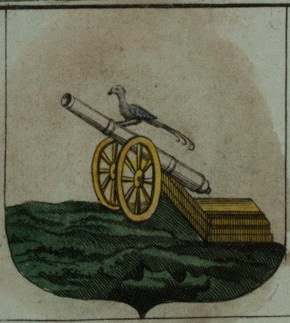
Drawing from 1818

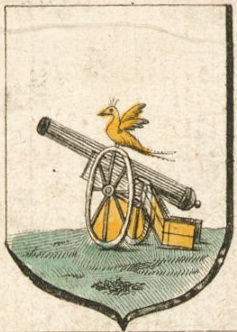
Coat of arms of Smolensk Governorate from a children's playing card by K. M. Gribanov, 1829

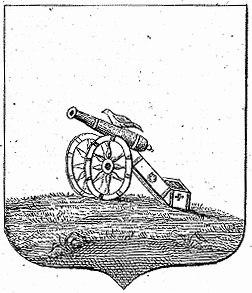
Drawing from the Complete Collection of the Laws of the Russian Empire. 1843

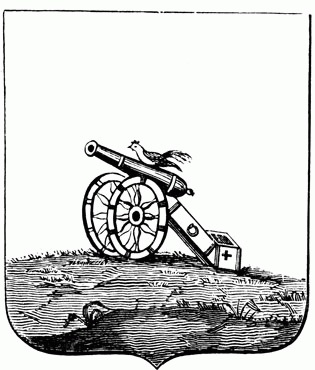
Drawing from 1899

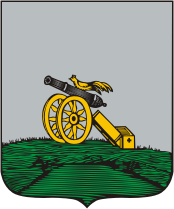
Contemporary coloured version

On 8 (20) December 1856 the coat of arms of Smolensk Governorate was approved (the city coat of arms remained unchanged): "in a silver field a black cannon, the carriage and wheels in a golden frame, on the fuse a bird of paradise." As with the coats of arms of other provinces, the escutcheon was crowned with an imperial crown and decorated with oak branches bearing golden leaves and twisted with a blue ribbon. In the 1856 images of the coat of arms, the bird of paradise finally "stood on its feet" and "stands firmly on them, proudly backing a magnificent tail and spreading its wings". It is also present on the modern coat of arms of Smolensk and the majority of its derivatives in this from.

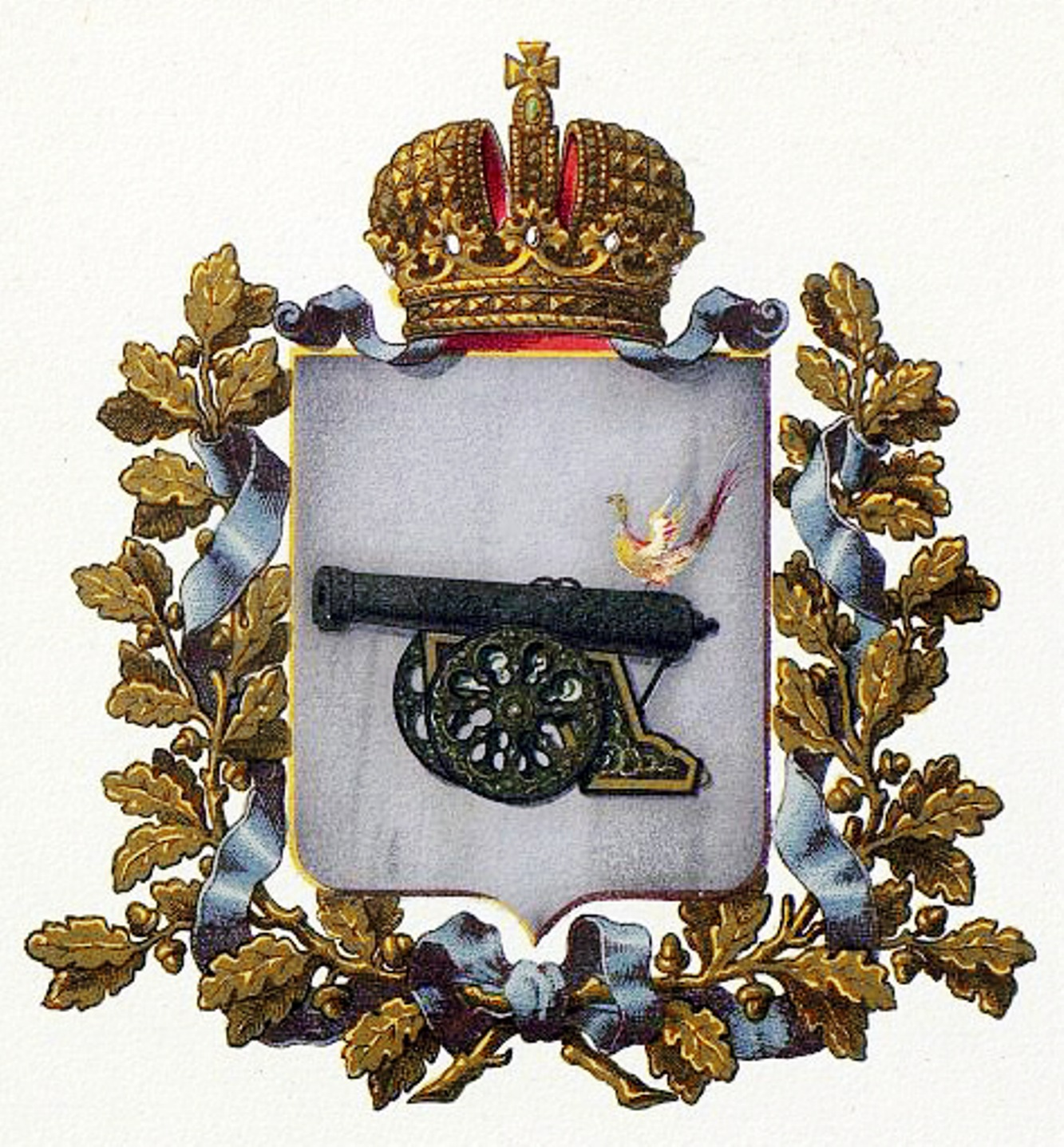
Coat of arms of the Smolensk Governorate in 1856. Official drawing of 1880

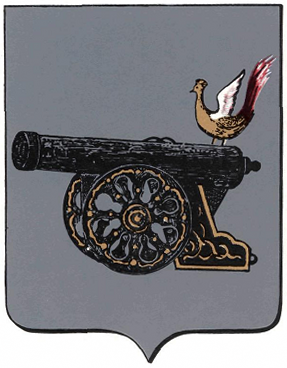
Drawing from 1974 (without embellishments)

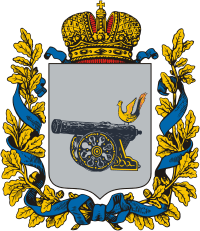
Modern drawing

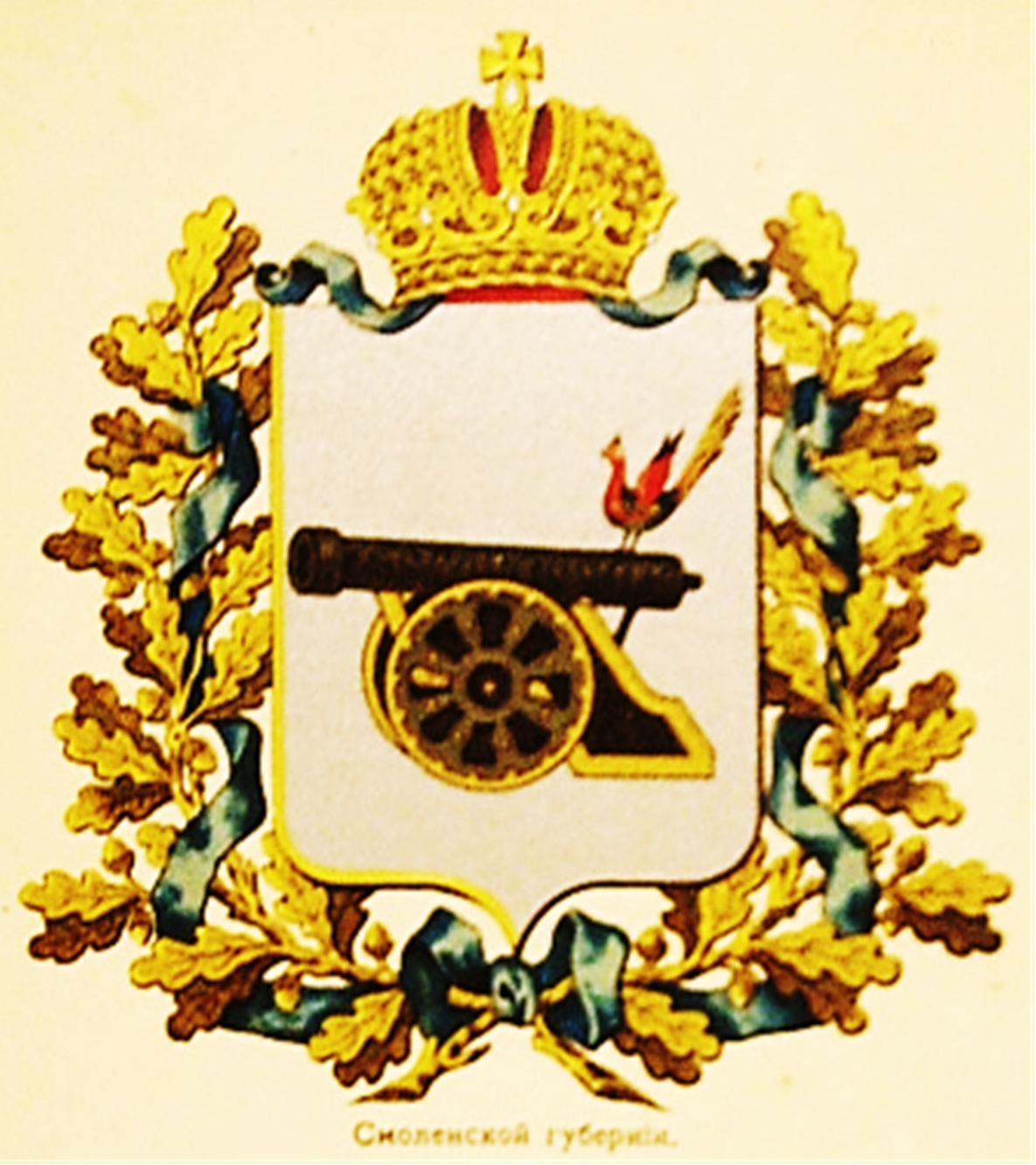
Postcard from 1903-1904

In 1857, Emperor Alexander II approved the original system of decorations for city coats of arms, developed by B. Koehne, the head of the Coat of Arms Branch of the Department of Heraldry. In accordance with this system, Smolensk was entitled to three distinct types of crowns: As a provincial city with a population of less than 50,000 people, the city was entitled to a golden tower crown of three prongs. As a provincial city-fortress, the city was entitled to a golden tower crown of three prongs with an imperial eagle. Finally, as an ancient city where the reigning grand princes stayed, the city was entitled to the cap of Monomakh. In addition, Vladimir Monomakh laid the Dormition Cathedral in Smolensk and transported to the city an icon of the Mother of God (Hodegetria), named Smolensk, which became the symbol of the city. The city was entitled to two types of shield decorations. As a fortress city, it was entitled to the Alexander Ribbon (red) and two gold crossed banners with the imperial eagle. As a fortress that distinguished itself in battles, it was entitled to the St. George Ribbon and two red banners standing upright and decorated with the monograms of the emperor, during whose reign the fortress distinguished itself (Alexander I).

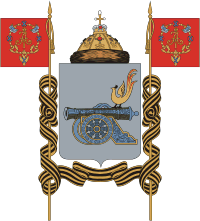
Modern reconstruction of the coat of arms of Smolensk according to the decree of 1857 by R. I. Malanichev

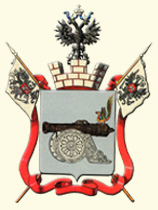
Another reconstruction

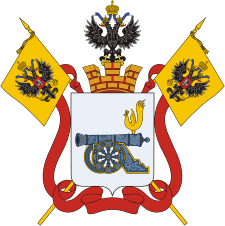
Its variation

=== In the USSR ===
Given that the Smolensk coat of arms lacked both monarchical and religious symbols, there were no impediments to its utilisation during the Soviet era. The shield was frequently depicted in red. It is notable that several original free images were made, for example, on the front curtain of the Smolensk Drama Theatre by artist M. M. Tarayev in 1983, where the bird resembles Pegasus; or on the dish Coat of Arms of Smolensk by V. A. Gorodnichev of the Dulyovo porcelain works in 1989, where the composition is turned towards the viewer, and Gamayun is depicted with a woman's face and breasts and half-open wings.

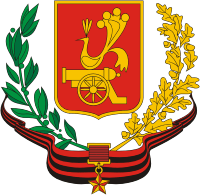
One of the free depictions of the Smolensk coat of arms during the Soviet era. 1980s

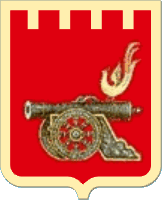
Another Soviet portrayal

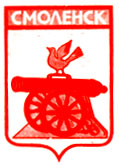
Another one (1987)

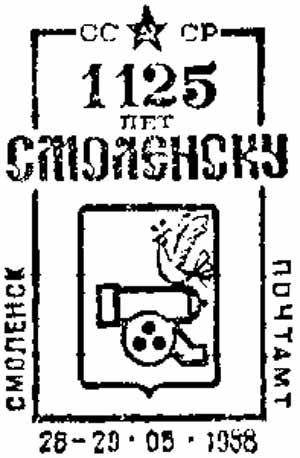
Postmark 1125 years of Smolensk. 1988

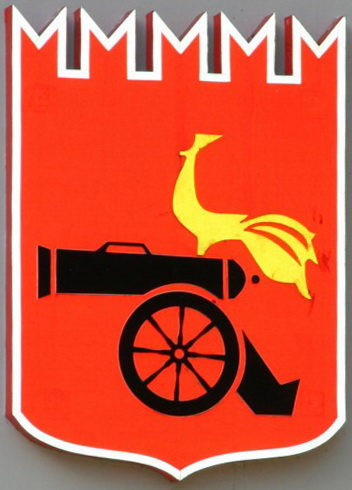
Coat of arms on the stele at the entrance to Smolensk Oblast

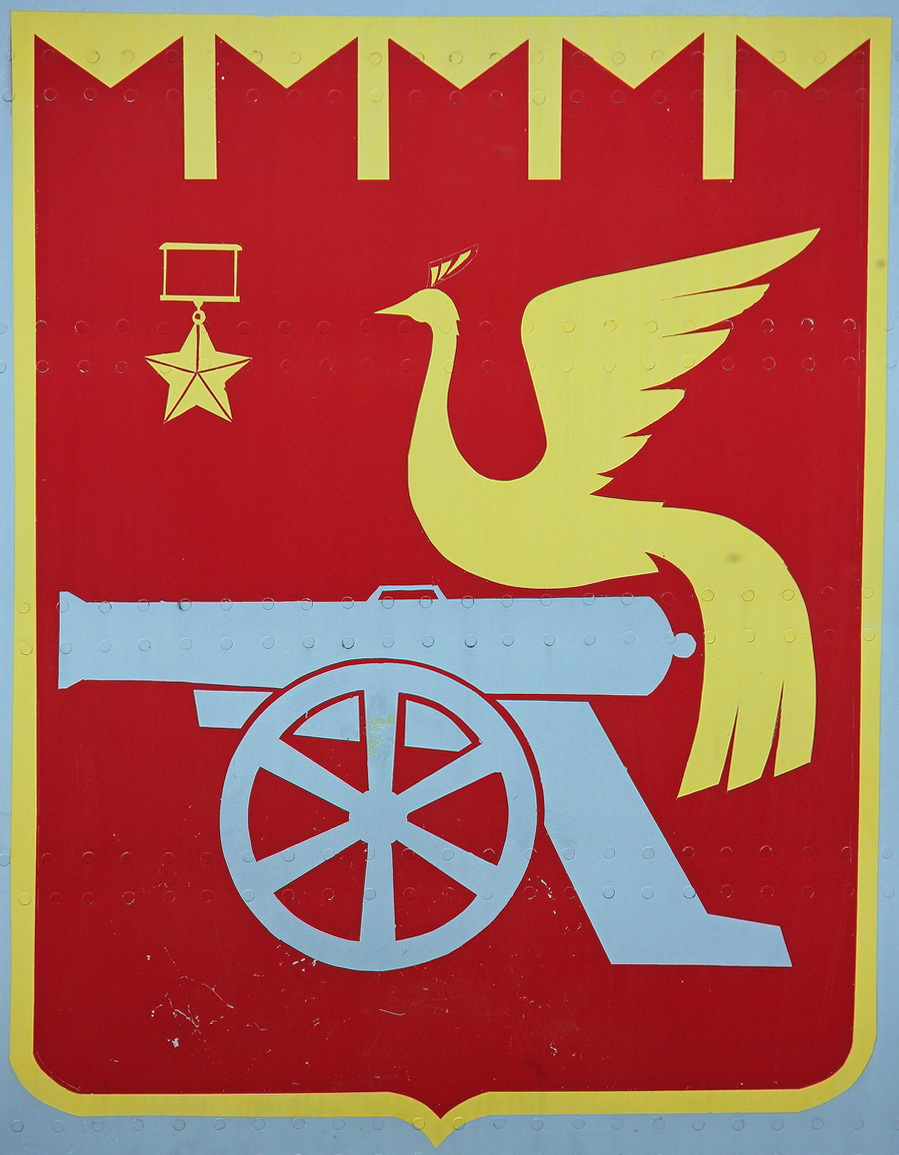
The coat of arms of Smolensk on board the Il-76 military transport aircraft of the Russian Air Force, named Hero City of Smolensk since 2000

=== Establishment of the current coat of arms ===
In the post-Soviet Russia, the question of the revival of city coats of arms emerged. In accordance with the Smolensk City Council's decision of 27 April 2001, "On the Coat of Arms of the Hero City of Smolensk", since, according to the recommendations of the State Heraldry under the President of the Russian Federation, the city coats of arms approved before 1917 remained in force, the city's coat of arms was not restored to its former form, but rather a historical coat of arms was created, taking into account the rules of heraldry and the city's new merits to Russia. The author of the monograph Coat of Arms of Smolensk (1993), G. V. Razhnyov, was responsible for the compilation of the coat of arms.

According to the explanatory note to the coat of arms, in accordance with the 1857 decree on the design of the city coat of arms, Smolensk, as a fortress city whose defenders showed heroism in battles, had the right to place on the escutcheon two red banners decorated with the monograms of those whose rule distinguished the fortress. In 1609-1611 the defence of Smolensk was led by Mikhail Shein, and in 1812 Russia was ruled by Alexander I. Both monograms are situated within the chain of the Order of St. Andrew. As an honorable exception to the rule, the former capital of the Grand Duchy and the city where Vladimir Monomakh himself ruled is granted the privilege of displaying the cap of Monomakh on the escutcheon of the coat of arms, which is crowned with the cap. The coat of arms is displayed on a golden five-pointed star, which is a distinctive and exclusive privilege reserved for the hero cities. In accordance with the established conventions of Russian heraldry, under the escutcheon are the city's honours, represented by a ribbon of the Order of the Patriotic War I degree and a ribbon of the Order of Lenin.

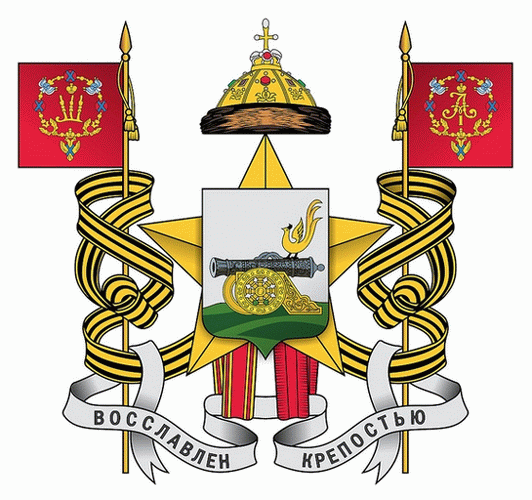
Original drawing prepared by G. V. Razhnyov as the coat of arms of Smolensk in 2001. It differs from the adopted one by the monogram "Sh" and the ground under the cannon

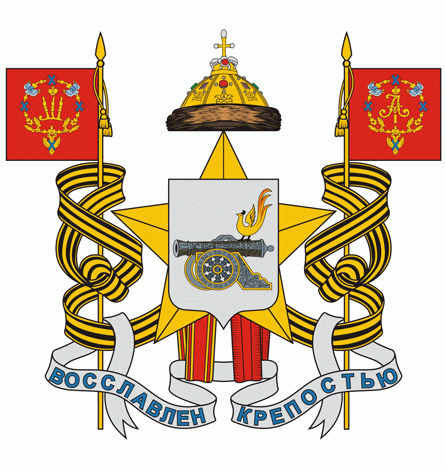
Another version of the project. It is distinguished by the monogram "Sh"

A novel element in the coat of arms of the city is the motto, which, in heraldry, is traditionally regarded as a symbol of honour, the high position of the coat of arms owner, solemnity and, as Y. V. Arsenyev posits, "an adventitious sign of luxury." The text of the motto is a quotation from M.I. Kutuzov's address to the inhabitants of Smolensk in 1812. Another source indicates that the term "glorified" (Russian: восславлен) is derived from A. S. Pushkin "as more euphonious than 'renowned'"(Russian: прославлен). In selecting a motto, G. V. Razhnyov aimed to ensure that it met the following criteria:

To be extremely brief, but expressive, concise and multivalent in content, reinforcing the symbolism of the coat of arms, giving it even greater grandeur, pathos and poetry. It is these requirements and meet the sublime and poetic words of the motto: "GLORIFIED BY STRENGTH". The motto is also perfect from the pictorial point of view, as its two words by the number of letters are absolutely symmetrical, having nine letters each, which gives the coat of arms additional decorativeness. On the one hand, the word "fortress" reminds of the fortress of morale of Smolensk soldiers, which they have repeatedly demonstrated in battles (the army of Mercury of Smolensk, Smolensk regiments in the Battle of Grunwald, the Battle of Poltava, Suvorov's Alpine campaign, in 1812 and other battles). On the other hand, Smolensk has been famous as a fortress city since ancient times. The Smolensk Fortress Wall, built by the whole of Russia, has become an unofficial symbol of Smolensk, its unofficial shrine, a source of pride for all Smolensk residents.

— Decision of the Smolensk City Council of 27.04.2001 No. 111 "On the Coat of Arms of the Hero City of Smolensk"

The monogram "Sh," which denotes Mikhail Shein, is depicted on one of the two banners on the original drawing of the coat of arms prepared by G. V. Razhnyov. This monogram was mentioned, probably erroneously, in the explanatory note to the coat of arms of 2001. Subsequently, the second monogram of Alexander I replaced it on the coat of arms. The image in the 2001 decision, the official description from the same year, the certificate of inclusion of the coat of arms in the Matricula of the Russian Heraldic Collegium, and the coat of arms submitted for examination to the Heraldic Council of the President of the Russian Federation all provide evidence of the coat of arms in question. It seems probable that the monogram of Shein was replaced, as on the banners in question, only monograms of emperors should be displayed: XXVII. Consequently, between 1610 and 1612, there was no tsar in Russia.

Additionally, there is a critical perspective on the contemporary large coat of arms of Smolensk. E. V. Pchelov observes that the combination of monarchical symbols (historical coat of arms, Monomakh's cap, banners with monograms of Alexander I) and Soviet symbols (the Gold Star of the Hero-City, ribbons of Soviet orders) is a prevalent motif in modern Russian heraldry. However, this combination gives rise to a "creepy 'centaur'", a metaphorical representation of the incongruity between the two symbol sets.

== On other symbols ==
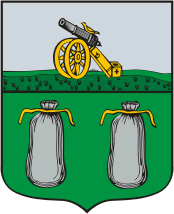
Coat of Arms of Bely (1780) as an example of a Coat of Arms of Smolensk Viceroyalty

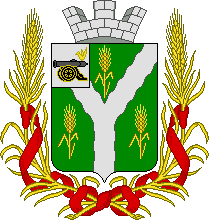
Coat of Arms of Bely as an example of reconstruction of drawings of coats of arms of 1859

Until a certain point in Russian heraldry, city coats of arms were not distinct from those of territorial units with their centre in the city. Consequently, the symbol of Smolensk was simultaneously that of the titular Smolensk principality, and since 1780 – that of the Smolensk Viceroyalty (Smolensk Governorate). In 1856, a separate coat of arms was adopted for Smolensk Governorate.

On 10 (21) October 1780, the coats of arms of the towns of the Smolensk viceroyalty were officially adopted. In accordance with the prevailing conventions of the period, the Smolensk coat of arms was positioned in the upper section, with an individual element displayed in the lower section. The exceptions to this rule were the coats of arms of the ancient towns of Vyazma and Dorogobuzh.

In 1857, Emperor Alexander II approved the original system of decorations for city coats of arms, developed by B. K. Koehne, the head of the Coat of Arms Branch of the Department of Heraldry. In accordance with this scheme, new coats of arms were designed for the towns of Smolensk Governorate. The coat of arms of the province was no longer to occupy the entire upper part of the shield, but rather to be placed in its free part. All the towns received the same type of decorations for their coats of arms: an argent tower crown with three prongs as a symbol of a district town and two golden spikelets as a symbol of the predominance of agriculture in the province, connected by the Alexander (red moiré) ribbon, which was reminiscent of the Order of St. Alexander Nevsky, which was also used to honour civilian service to the Fatherland. The designs for the coats of arms were approved on 30 January 1859, but for various reasons were not published at the time or sent to the relevant locations, remaining unknown. The documents are currently held in the Russian State Historical Archive.

Following the fall of the Russian monarchy, the Smolensk emblem continued to be used as the titular coat of arms of the Principality of Smolensk, initially on the great (full) coat of arms of the Russian Empire. In the project of the Full coat of arms of the All-Russian Empire of Paul I in 1800, the following description is provided: "This coat of arms contains in a silver field black on green ground standing cannon, lying on the carriage, on which stands the Bird of Paradise". The titular coats of arms were officially approved by Emperor Alexander II on 11 (23) April 1857. The description of the Smolensk coat of arms is as follows: "In a silver field, a black cannon; the carriage and wheels in a golden frame; on the fuse, a bird of paradise".

Title coat of arms of the Principality of Smolensk from the project The Manifesto on the Complete Arms of the All-Russian Empire of 1800

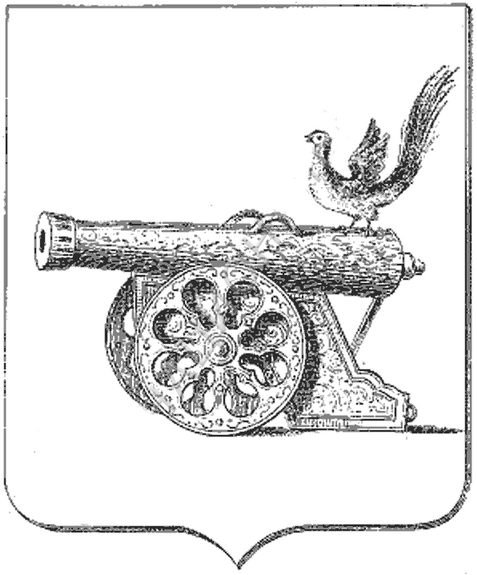
Title coat of arms of the Principality of Smolensk, adopted in 1857

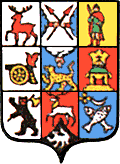
Among the coats of arms of "principalities and regions of Great Russia" on the Coat of Arms of the Russian Empire. Modern reconstruction by R. I. Malanichev

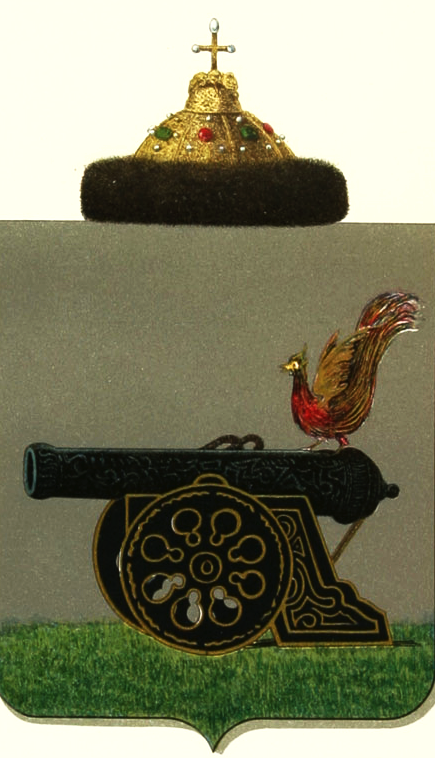
Title coat of arms of the Principality of Smolensk from the book Armorial of the All-Russian nobility of 1906
Coats of Arms of the Nobility
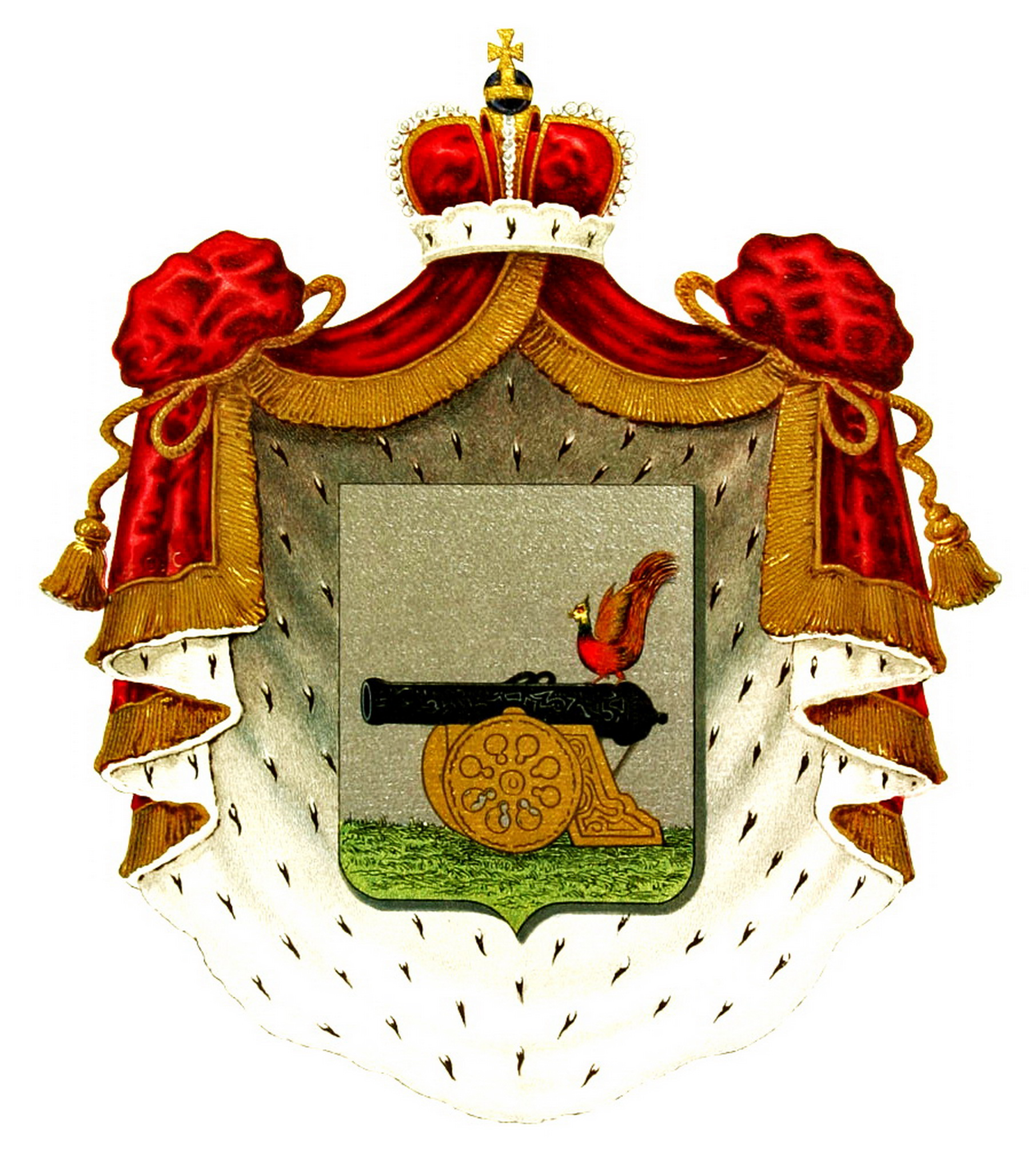
Coat of Arms of the Vyazemskys, Karpovs-Dolmatovs, Kropotkins, Rzhevskys from the Armorial of the All-Russian Nobility

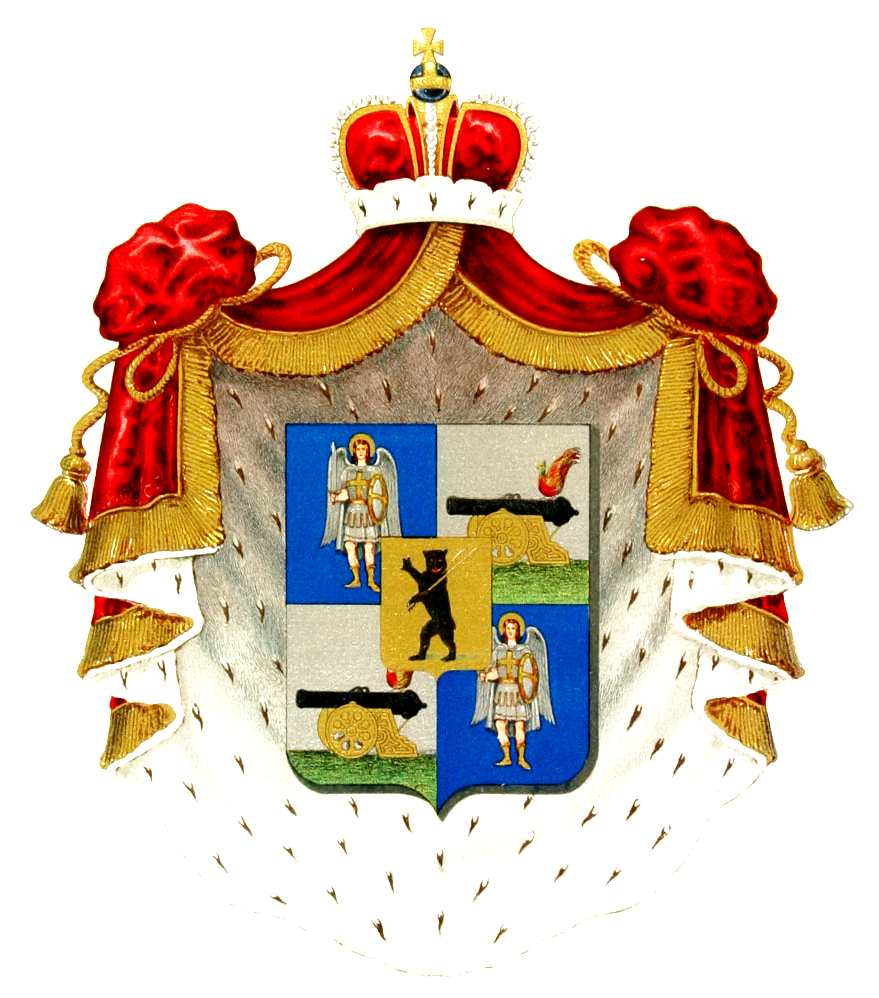
Coat of Arms of the Zasekin, Lvov, Sontsov, Sontsov-Zasekin, Shakhovski, Shchetinin from the Armorial of the All-Russian Nobility

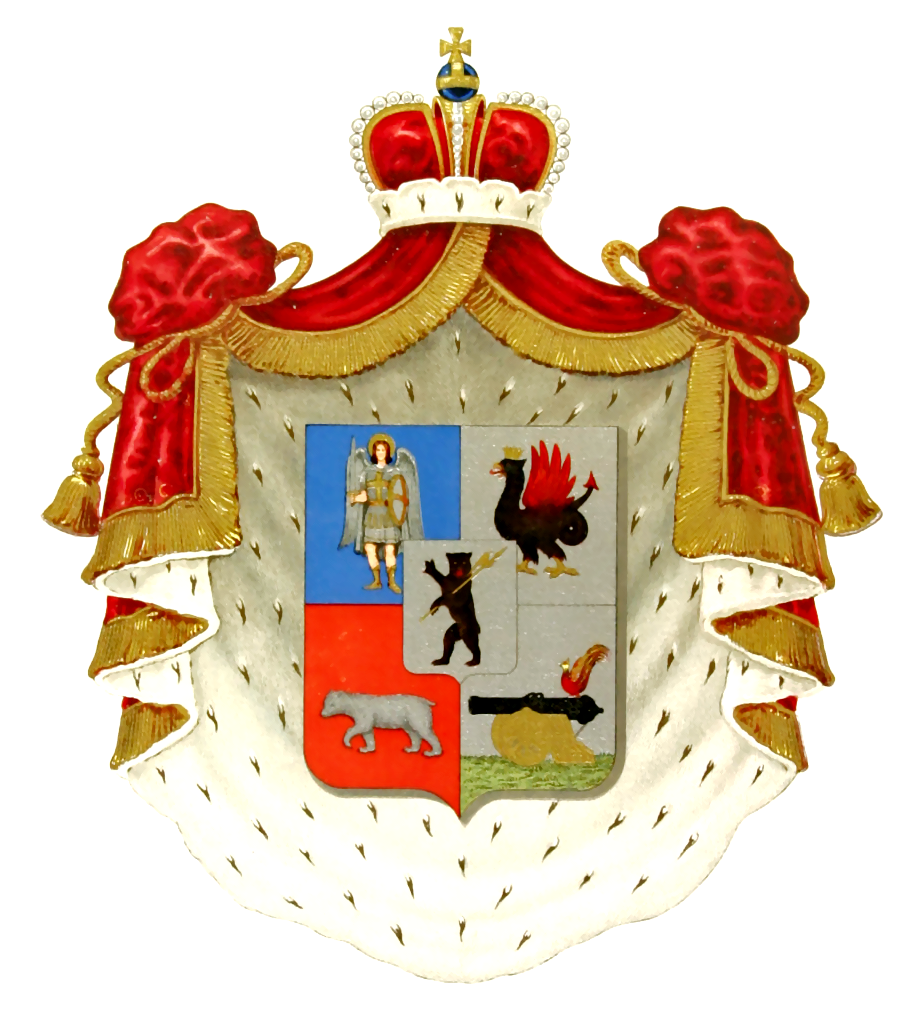
Coat of Arms of the Prozorovsky family from the Armorial of the All-Russian Nobility

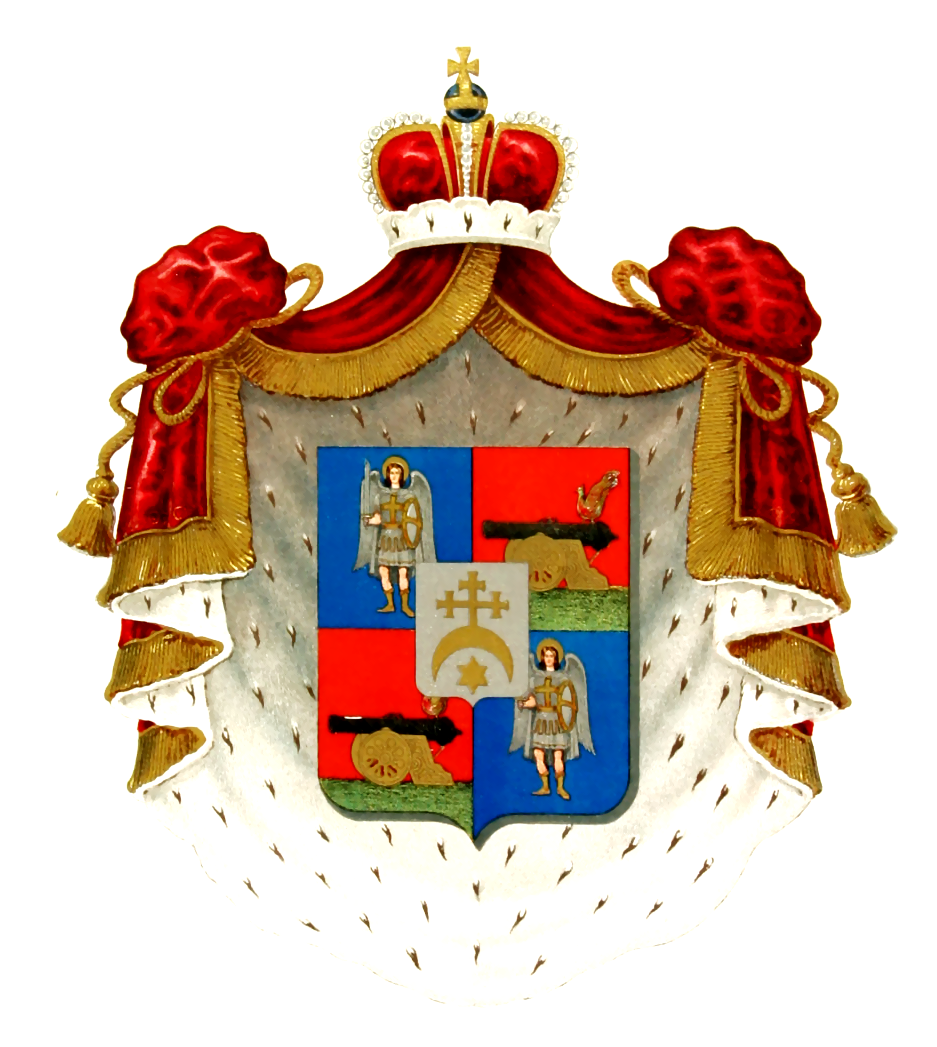
Coat of Arms of the Dashkov family from the Armorial of the All-Russian Nobility

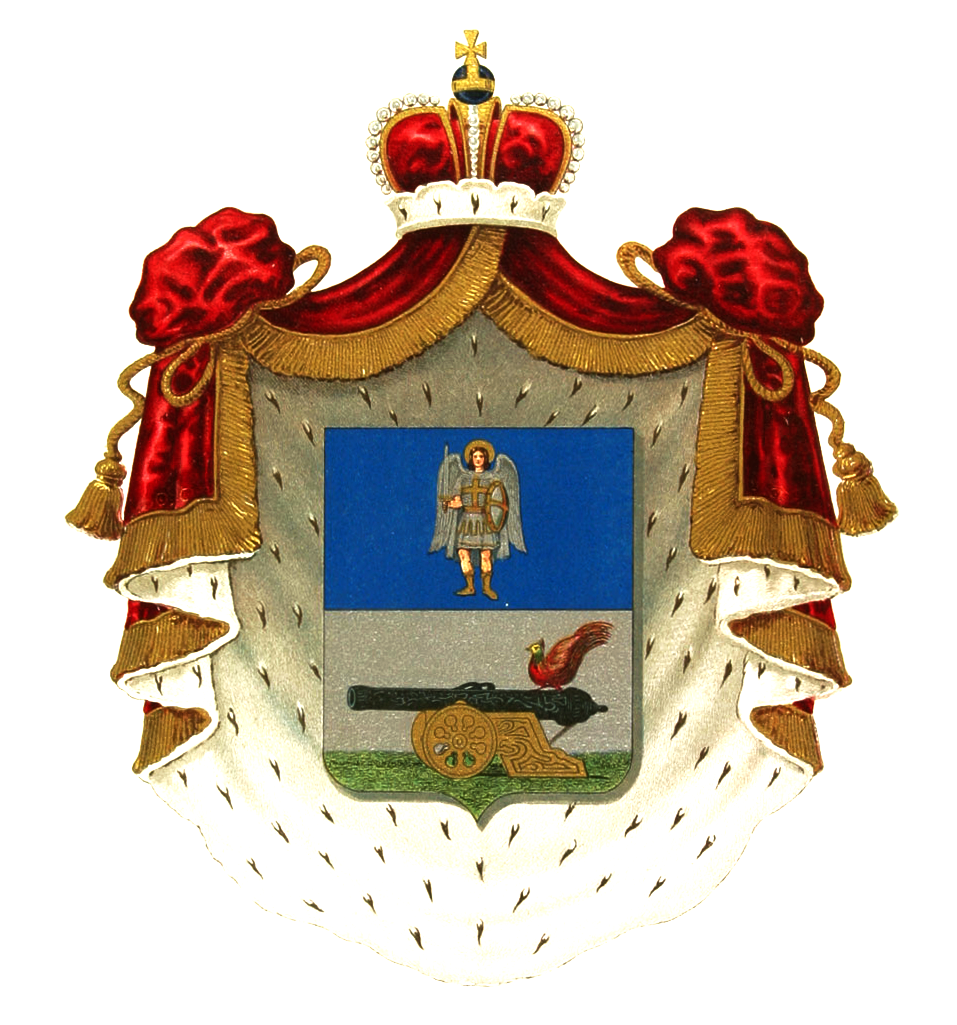
Coat of Arms of the Vsevolozhsky family from the Armorial of the All-Russian Nobility

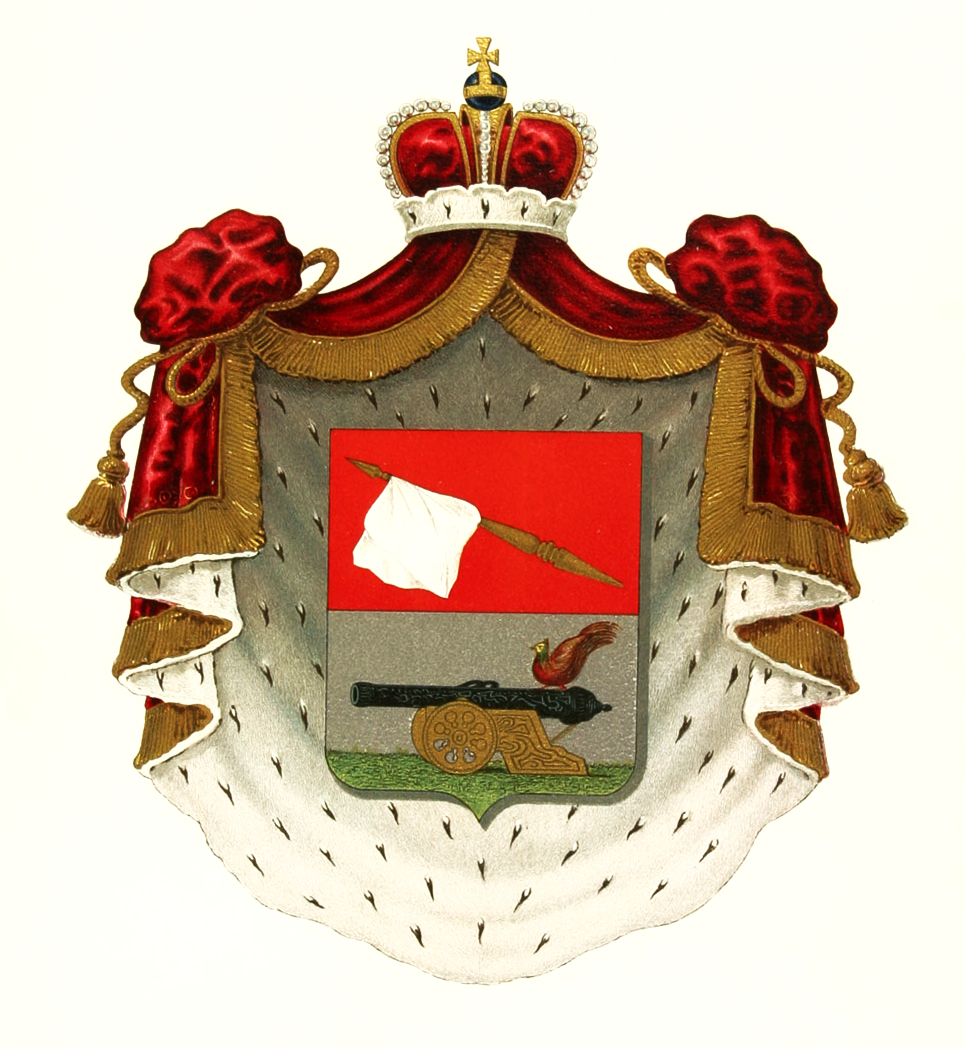
Coat of arms of the Tatishchev family from the Armorial of the All-Russian Nobility

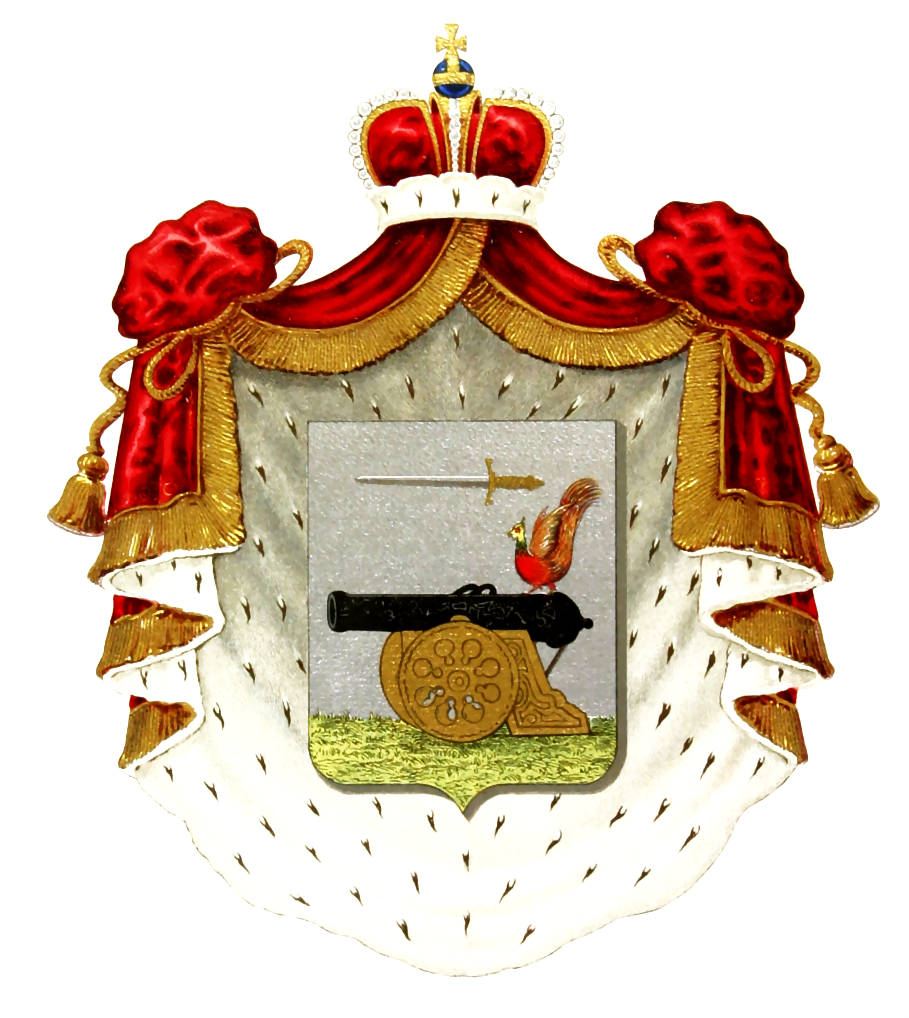
Coat of Arms of the Eropkin family from the Armorial of the All-Russian Nobility

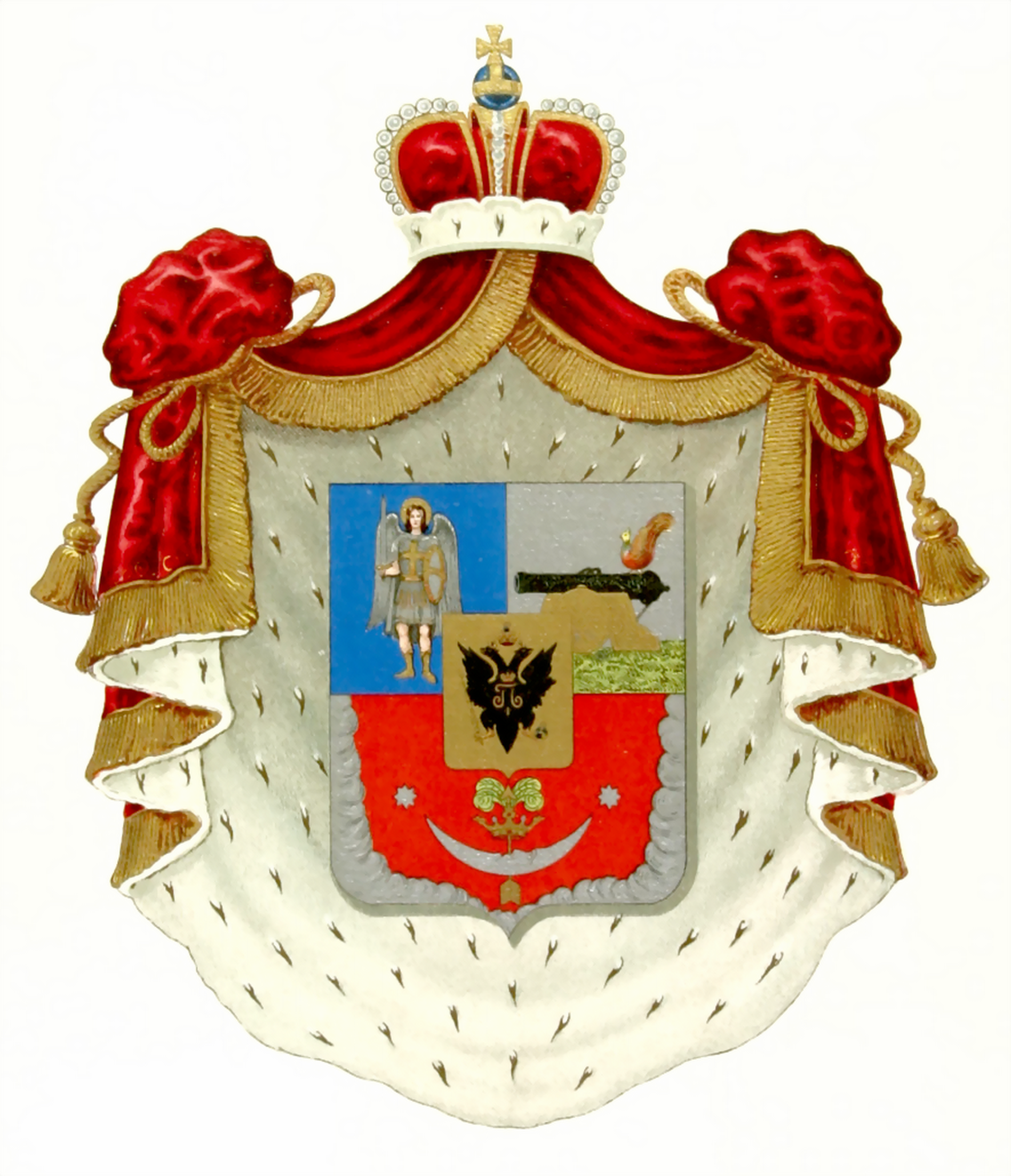
Coat of Arms of the Dmitrievs-Mamonov family from the Armorial of the All-Russian Nobility

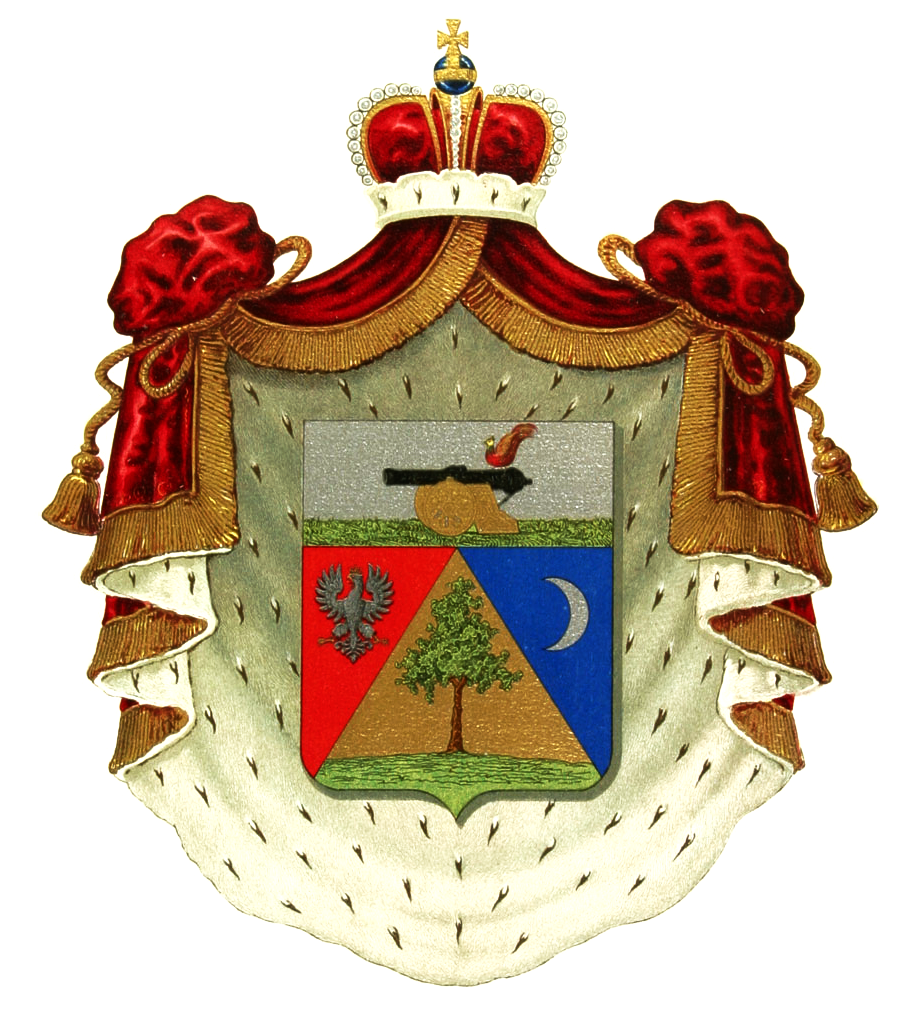
The coat of arms of the Dmitriev family from the Armorial of the All-Russian nobility

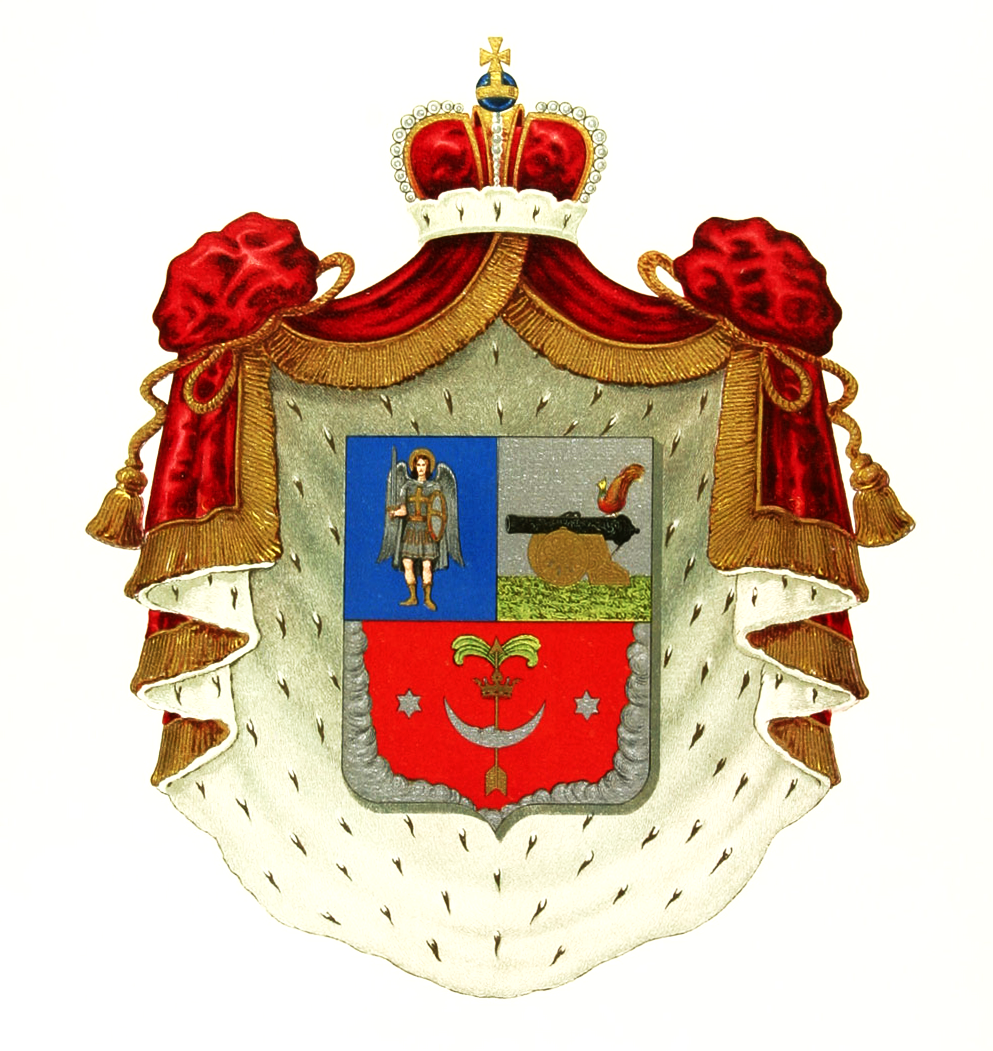
Coat of Arms of the Dmitrievs-Mamonov family from the Armorial of the All-Russian Nobility

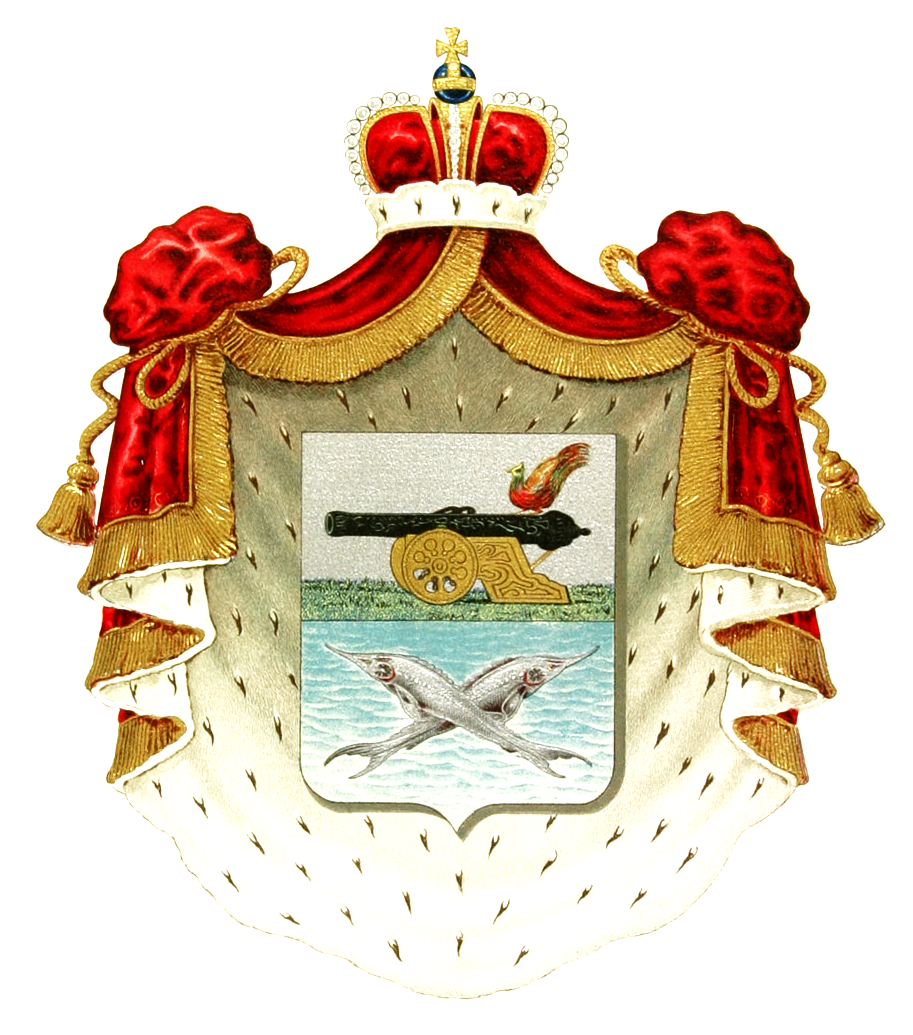
Coat of Arms of the Aladyin family from the Armorial of the All-Russian Nobility

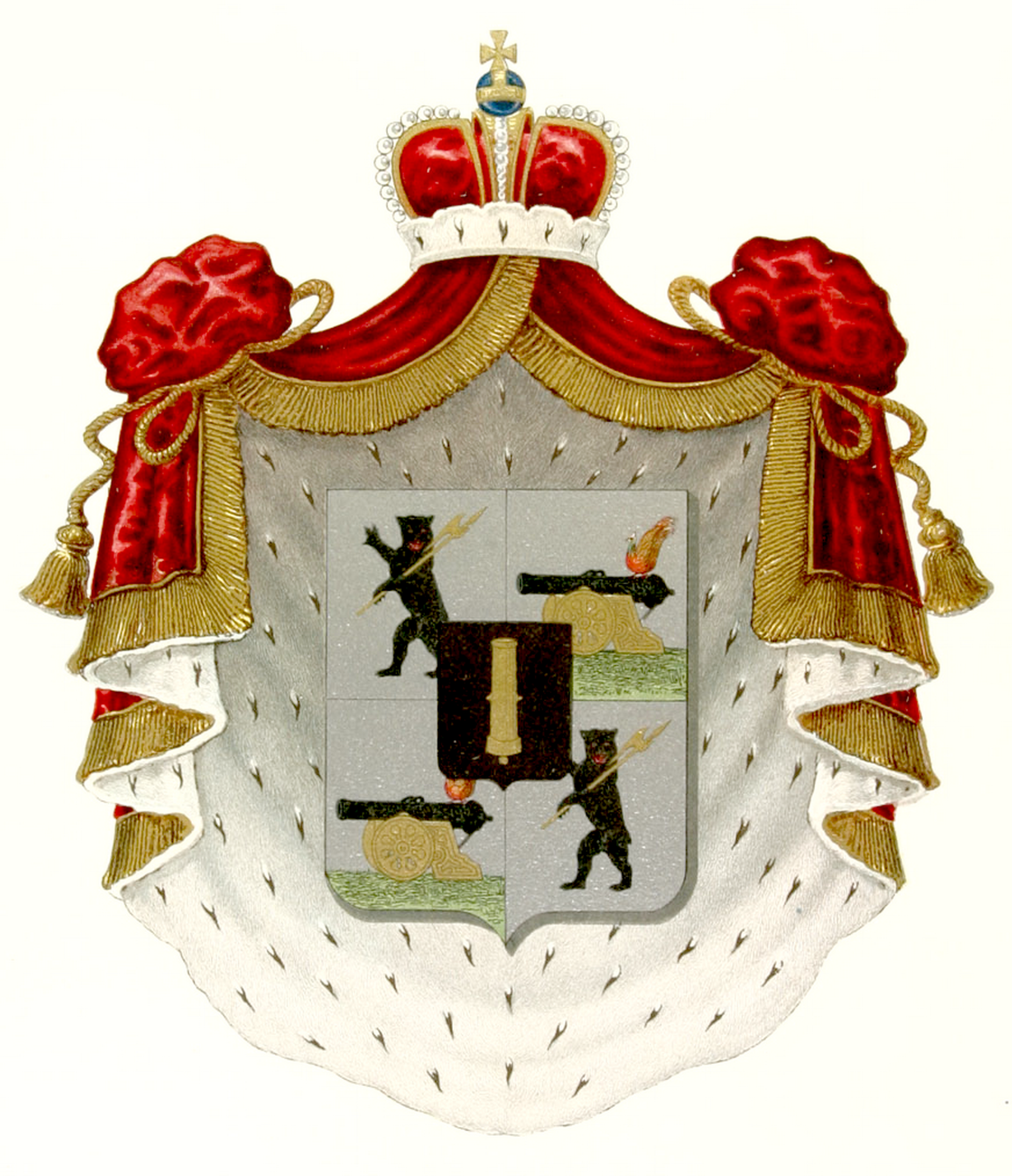
The coat of arms of the Dulov family from the Armorial of the All-Russian nobility

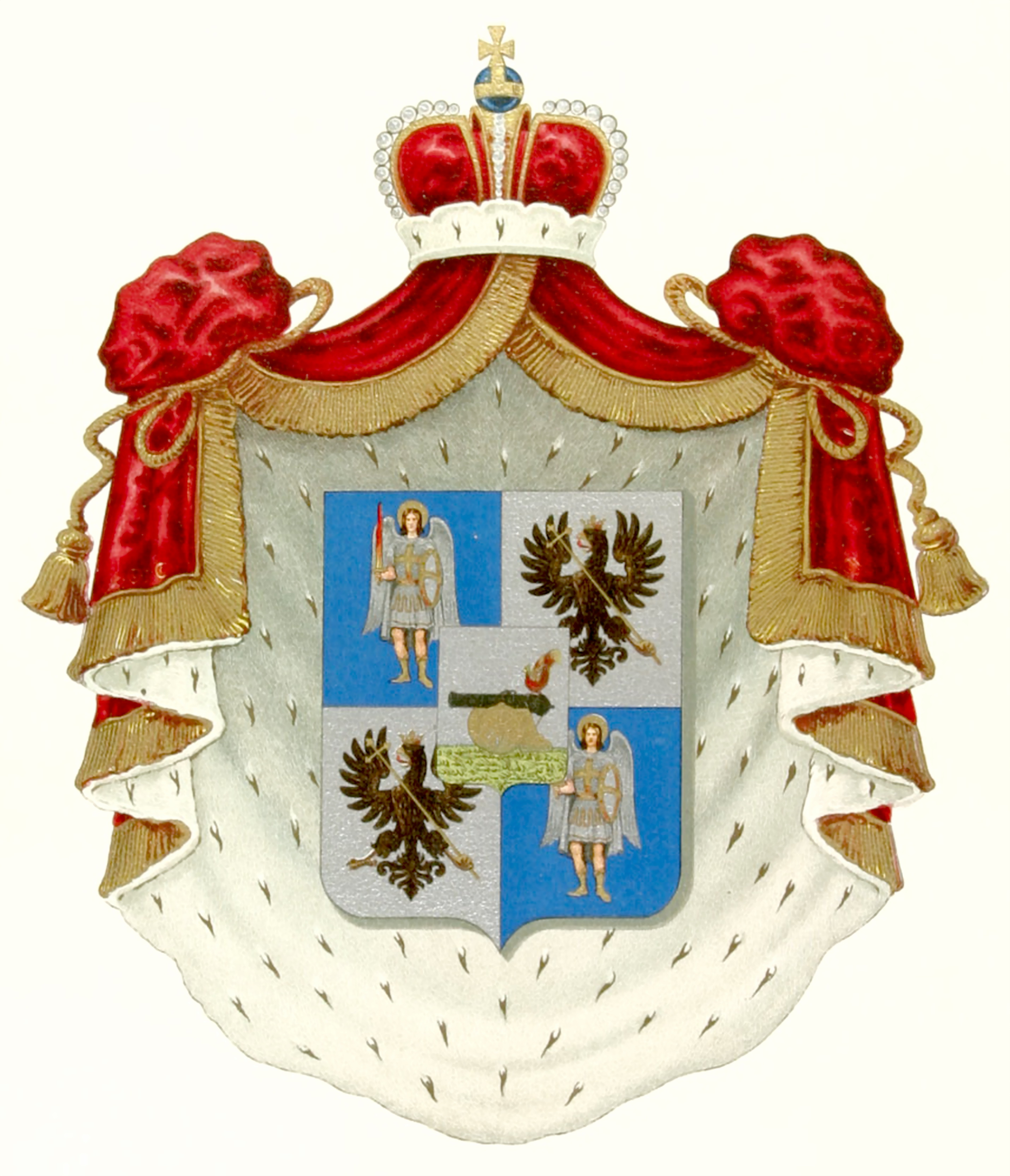
Coat of Arms of the Kozlovsky family from the Armorial of the All-Russian Nobility

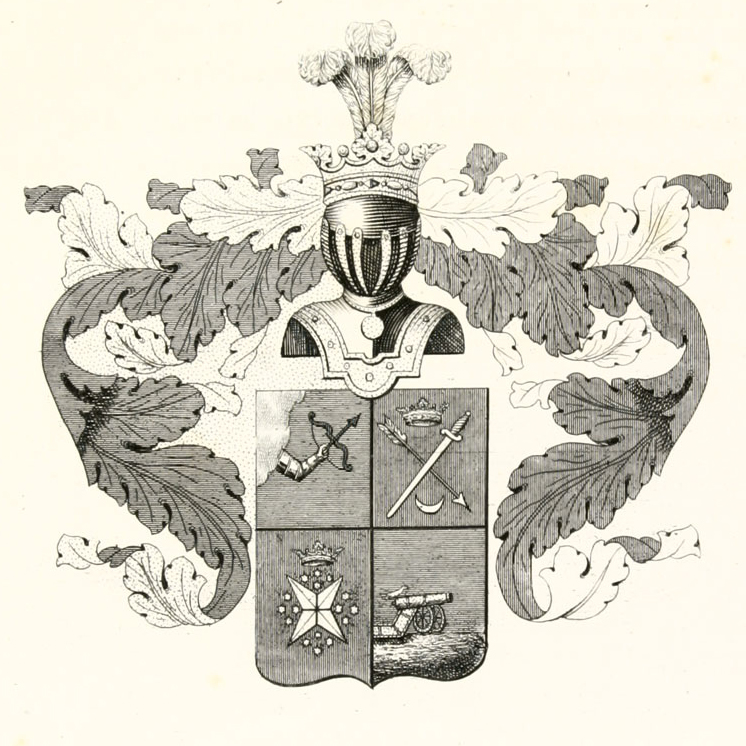
Coat of arms of the Korobkov family from the General armorial of noble families of the Russian Empire (1807)

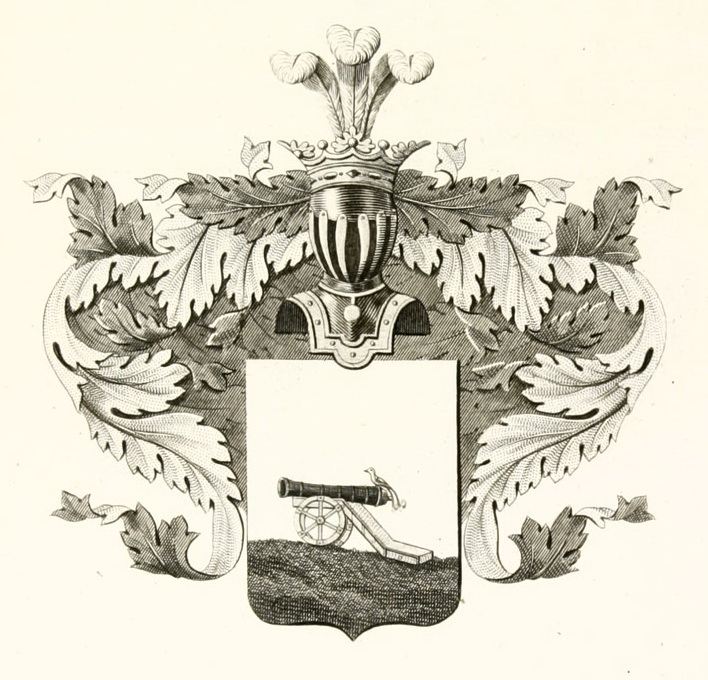
Coat of arms of the Karpov family from the General Armorial (1816)

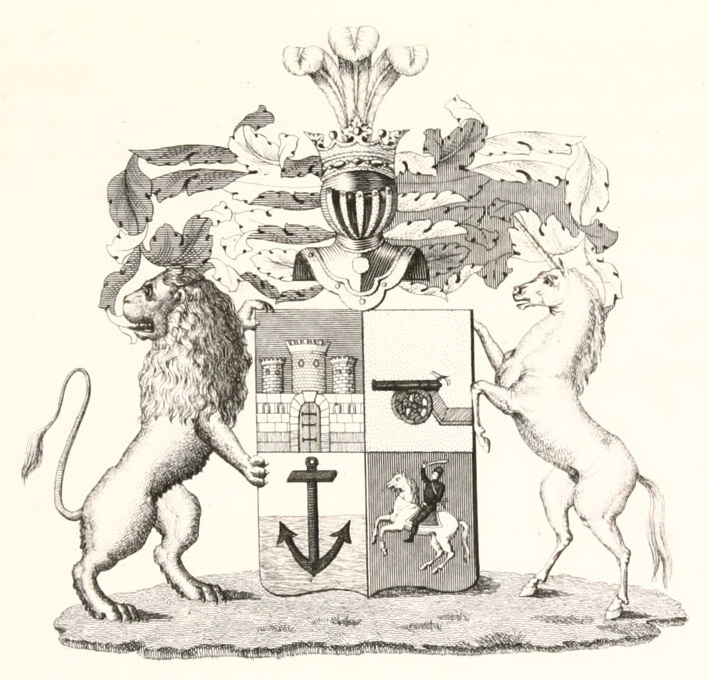
Coat of arms of the Kupreyanov family from the General Armorial (1836)

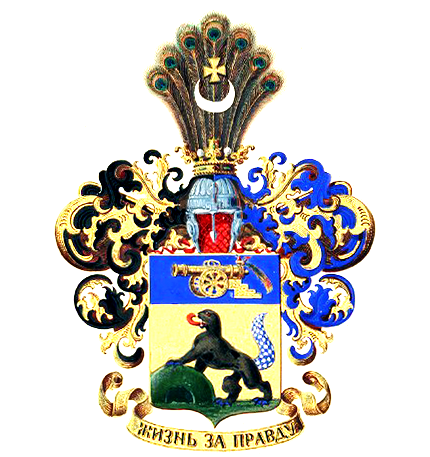
Coat of arms of Georgy Bobrikov from the General Armorial (1904)

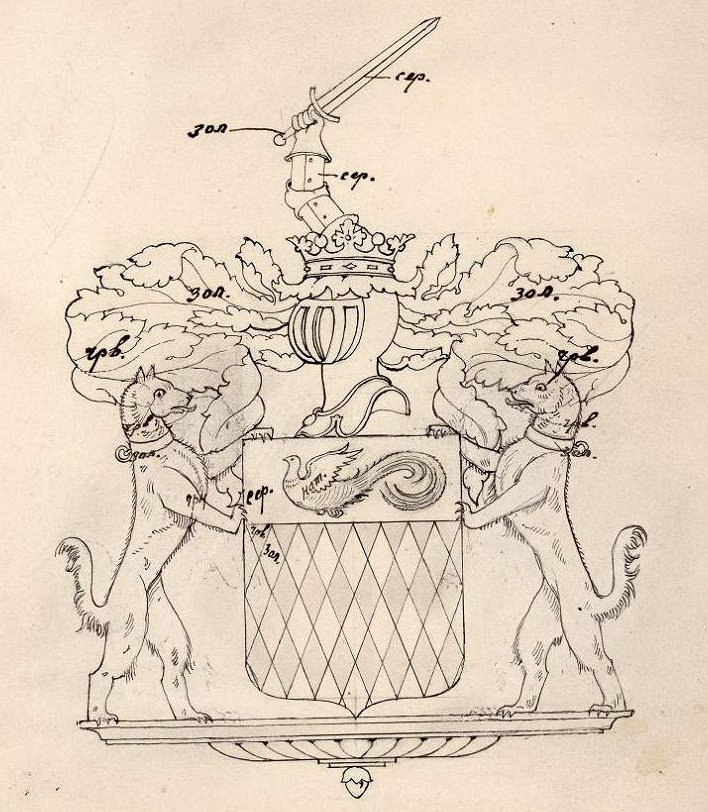
Draft coat of arms of Radkovich family from the General Armorial (1917)

The coat of arms of the Principality of Smolensk was also depicted on the coats of arms of the noble families that descended from the Smolensk Prince Rostislav Mstislavich. The Aladyin family, Vsevolozhsky family, Vyazemsky family, Dashkov family, Dmitriev family, Dmitriev-Mamonov family, Dulov family, Eropkin family, Zasekin family, Karpov-Dolmatov family, Kozlovsky family, Kropotkin family, Lvov family, Prozorovsky family, Rzhevsky family, Sontsov family, Sontsov-Zasekin family, Tatishchev family, Shakhovskoy family, Shekhonsky family, Shchetinin family, and others. Additionally, the Smolensk emblem is depicted on the coats of arms of the itinerant nobles: the Bobrikov family, Karpov family, Korobkov family, Kupreyanov family and Radkovich family. The images on some coats of arms are particularly distinctive, such as the 1917 coat of arms of the Radkovich nobles, which features a bird of paradise depicted "bright blue in colour with long lyre-shaped feathers". Another noteworthy example is the ex-libris of I. A. Vsevolozhsky by the artist A. E. von Völkerzam. The coats of arms of modern administrative units with their centres in this city were created on the basis of the coat of arms of Smolensk. On 10 December 1998, the coat of arms of the Smolensk region was officially adopted: "In a silver field on a black cannon with a golden carriage - a golden bird Gamayun with wings and tail decorated with chervlena and green". In addition, the regional flag was adopted, on which the regional emblem is placed at the top of the shaft. In accordance with the regional law of 30 October 2003, "On the coat of arms and flag of the Smolensk region," figures of the regional coat of arms may be included in the coats of arms of municipalities of the Smolensk region, located in their free part. On 3 July 2012, the coat of arms and flag of the Smolensk District of the Smolensk Region were approved. On the coat of arms "in a silver shield with a compound green and ermine border, on a green ground - a black cannon with a golden carriage, on which is a golden bird Gamayun". The bordure, "a symbol of the connection of related entities", in this case "symbolises not only the close ties between the two municipalities, but also their common history".

Coat of arms of Smolensk Oblast (since 1998)

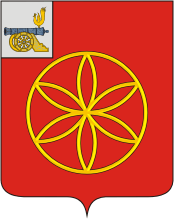
Coat of arms of Rudnyansky District (since 2000) as an example of the coat of arms of the Smolensk Oblast in the free part of the coat of arms of the municipality

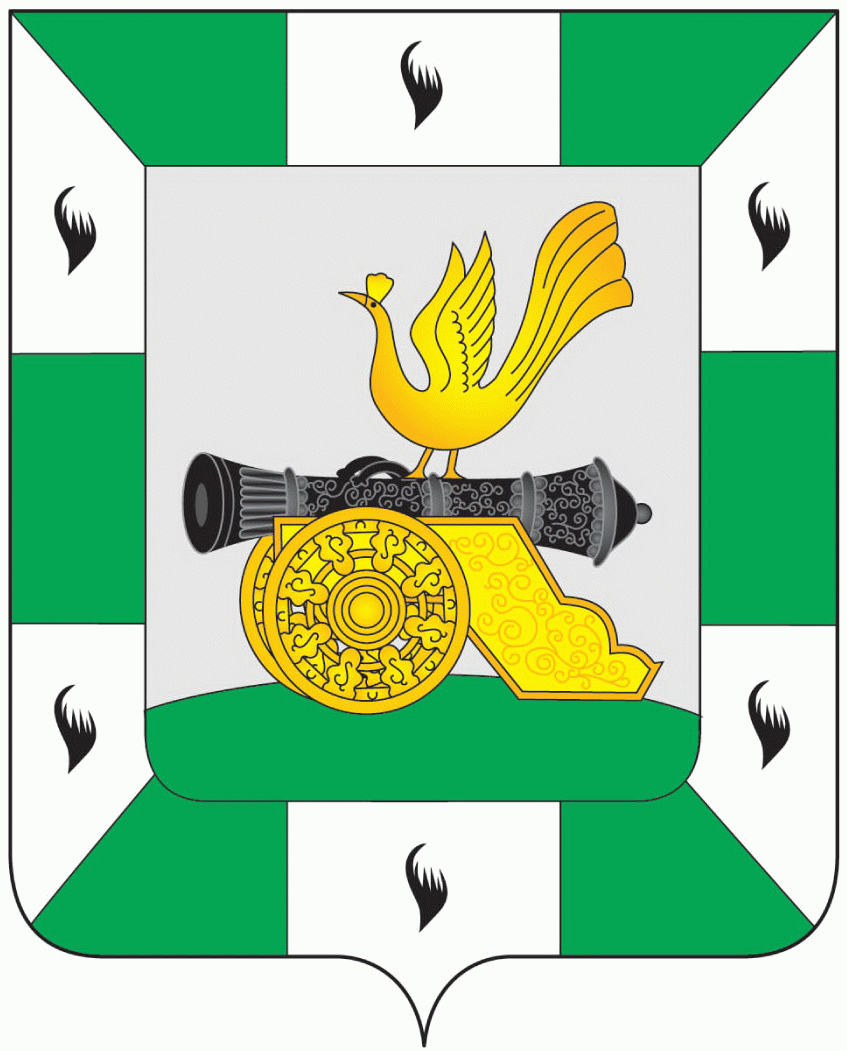
Coat of Arms of the Smolensk District (since 2012)

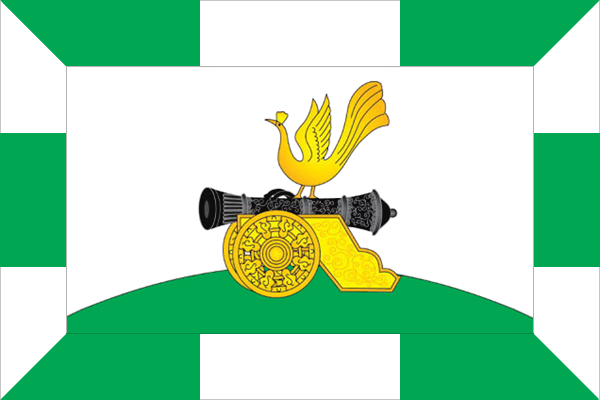
Flag of the Smolensk District (since 2012)

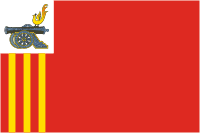
Flag of Smolensk (since 2001)

The second symbol of the city of Smolensk, its flag, was adopted on 31 May 2001. The cannon with the bird Gamayun in it is placed in an argent (white) canton. On 10 (21) October 1780, the coat of arms of Vyazma was approved, which stated that it "owns the coat of arms of Smolensk, as the senior appanage, the tribe of these princes". In a silver field, a black cannon on the carriage in gold and on the cannon a bird of paradise, with a difference from the Smolensk coat of arms by the position on top of the blue tittle, which in heraldry is a "sign of the younger". This image is the modern coat of arms of Vyazma and is present on its flag, which were approved on 20 May 2008.

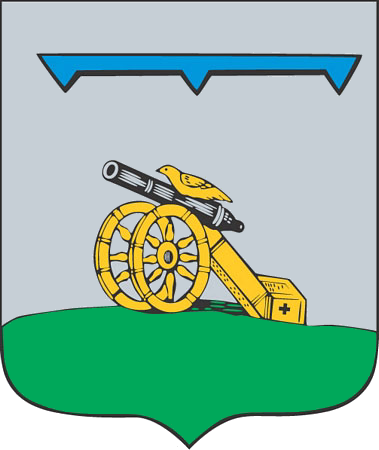
Coat of arms of Vyazma in 1780

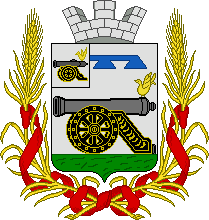
Reconstruction of the design of the coat of arms of Vyazma in 1859

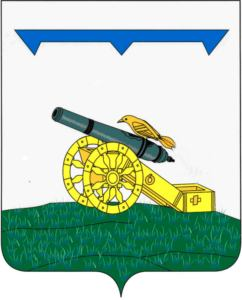
Coat of arms of Vyazma since 2008

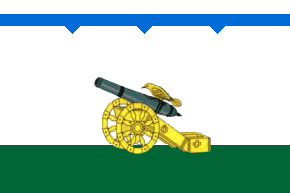
Flag of Vyazma since 2008

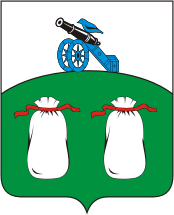
Coat of Arms of Belsky District, Tver Oblast (since 2002)

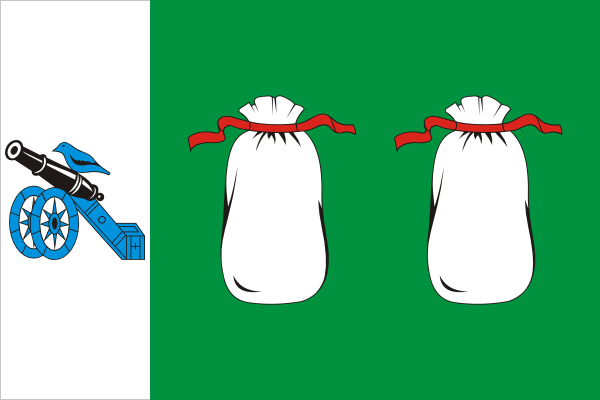
Flag of Belsky District (since 2001)

Although the towns of Bely and Yukhnov, which were previously part of the Smolensk province, have been transferred to neighbouring regions, the modern coats of arms of their districts retain Smolensk symbols. However, on the coat of arms of the Belsky district, adopted on 23 June 2002, the Gamayun bird is now inseparably connected with the individual element. In the description of the coat of arms of the Yukhnovsky district, adopted on 10 June 1997, the Gamayun bird is replaced by the Phoenix bird. In the majority of contemporary symbols, the Gamayun bird is depicted with legs. However, in the coats of arms of Vyazma and Beloye, its traditional depiction without legs is preserved. It is also observed that the Smolensk symbols are present on the emblems of territories whose histories are connected with the natives of Smolensk, situated outside the Smolensk region:

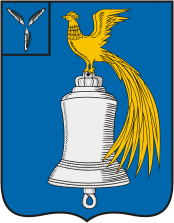
Coat of Arms of Tatishchevsky District, Saratov Oblast (since 1999)

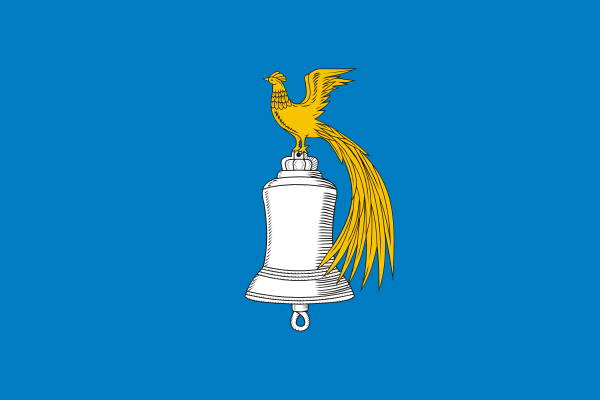
Flag of Tatishchevsky District (since 2006)

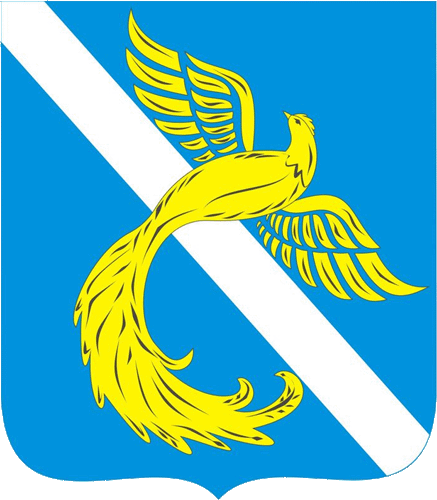
Coat of Arms of Tatishchevo (since 2014)

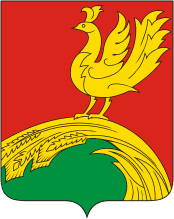
Coat of Arms of Terbunsky District, Lipetsk Oblast (since 2004)

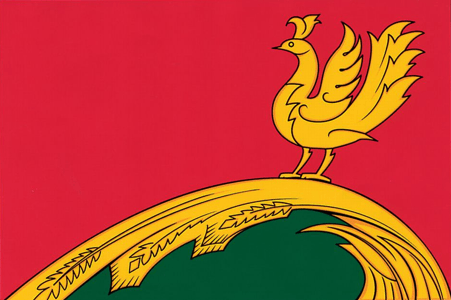
Flag of Terbunsky District (since 2004)

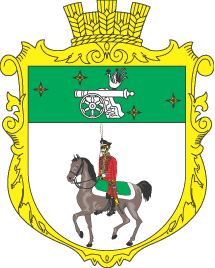
Coat of Arms of Gusarkovskiy Rural Council of Bilmakskiy District of Zaporizhzhya Oblast (since 2005)

Coat of Arms of Romanovsky Rural Settlement, Vsevolozhskiy District, Leningrad Region (since 2007)

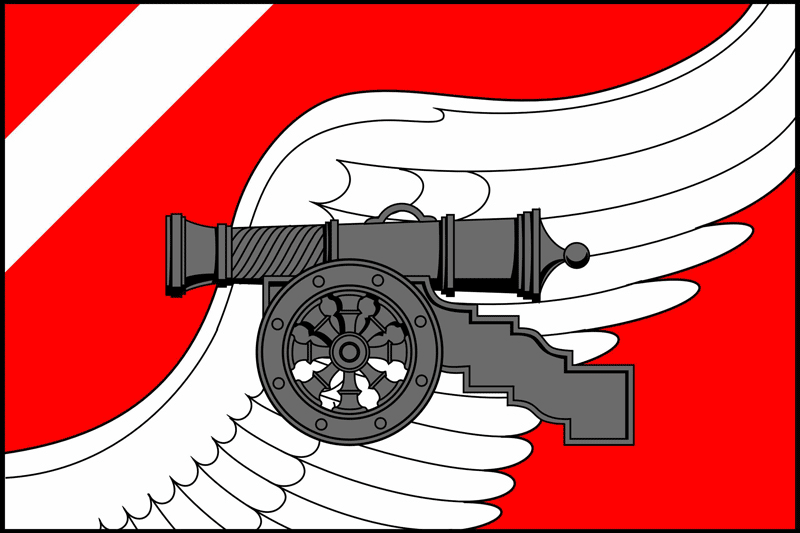
Flag of Romanovskoye Rural Settlement (since 2007)

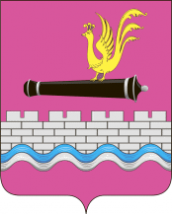
Coat of Arms of Smolensk Rural Settlement of Seversky District, Krasnodar Region (since 2011)

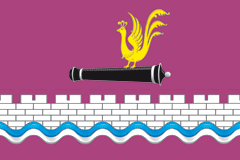
Flag of Smolensk Rural Settlement (since 2011)

In the 1915 publication Russian Heraldry, A guide to the compilation and description of coats of arms, written by V. K. Lukomsky and N. A. Tipolta, lists the bird of paradise among the legendary or fantastic emblem figures, and provides an example of its stylistic image by I. Y. Bilibin. Furthermore, Tipolt proposes the use of the figures of two other mythical birds of Russian culture, the alkonost and the sirin, as coats of arms. In the contemporary Russian context, several coats of arms featuring birds of paradise and wamayuns have emerged, independent of the coat of arms of Smolensk. The Gamayun birds are depicted with a female head, a consequence of the influence of V. M. Vasnetsov's painting Gamayun the prophetic bird of 1897.

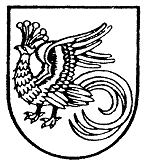
Heraldic bird of paradise by I. Y. Bilibin. 1915

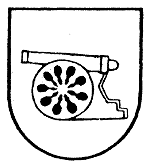
Heraldic cannon by I.Y. Bilibin's students. 1915
Coat of Arms of Gatchinsky District, Leningrad Oblast (since 2003)

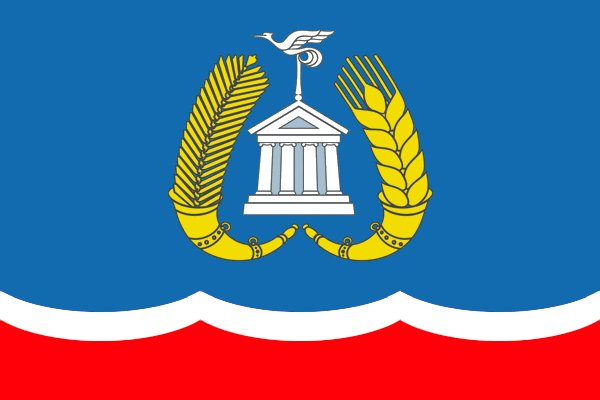
Flag of Gatchinsky District (since 2003)

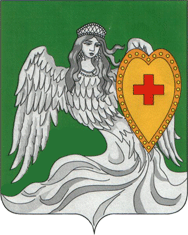
Coat of Arms of the Zelenogradsky Urban Settlement, Pushkinsky District, Moscow Oblast (since 2006)

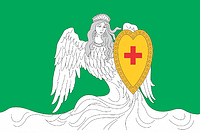
Flag of Zelenogradsky Urban Settlement (since 2006)

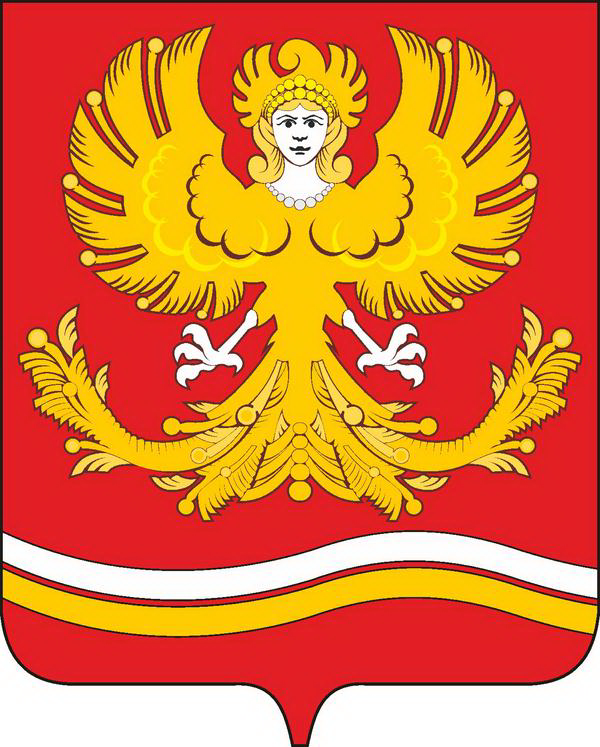
Coat of Arms of Mikhailovsky Municipality of Nizhneserginsk District, Sverdlovsk Oblast (since 2005)

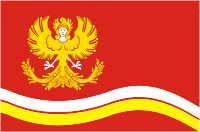
Flag of the Mikhailovsky Municipality (since 2005)

== Bibliography ==
- Lakier, Alexander (1855). Русская геральдика [Russian heraldry] (in Russian). Saint Petersburg.
- Винклер, П.П. (1899). Гербы городов, губерний, областей и посадов Российской империи, внесённые в полное собрание законов с 1649 по 1900 год [Coats of arms of cities, provinces, regions and towns of the Russian Empire, included in the complete collection of laws from 1649 to 1900] (in Russian). Saint Petersburg: Издание книгопродавца Ив. Ив. Иванова.
- Тарабрин, И.М. (1916). "Гомоюнъ" [Gamayun]. Лицевой букварь Кариона Истомина [Karion Istomin's alphabet book] (in Russian). Moscow: Тип. Г. Лисснера и Д. Собко. pp. 54–56.
- Тройницкий, С.Н. (1921). "О гербе смоленском" [About the coat of arms of Smolensk]. Известия Российской академии истории материальной культуры [Proceedings of the Russian Academy of the History of Material Culture] (in Russian). Vol. 1. pp. 345–355.
- Лукомский, В.К. (1946). "К вопросу о происхождении смоленского герба" [On the origin of the Smolensk coat of arms]. Труды Историко-архивного института [Proceedings of the Historical and Archival Institute] (in Russian). Vol. 2. Moscow.
- Сперансов, Н.Н. (1974). "История райской птицы" [The story of the bird of paradise]. Земельные гербы России XII—XIX вв [Land coats of arms of Russia in 12th-19th centuries] (in Russian). Moscow: Советская Россия. pp. 36–37.
- Рево, О. (1975). "Гербы городов Смоленской губернии" [Coats of arms of the towns of the Smolensk Governorate]. Nauka i Zhizn (in Russian) (10): 97.
- Драчук, В.С. (1977). "Эмблемы рассказывают" [The emblems tell]. Рассказывает геральдика [Heraldry tells] (in Russian). Moscow: Nauka.
- Соболева, Н.А. (1981). Буганов, В.И. (ed.). Российская городская и областная геральдика XVIII—XIX вв [Russian urban and regional heraldry of the 18th-19th centuries] (in Russian). Moscow: Nauka.
- Соболева, Н.А. (1985). Буганов, В.И. (ed.). Старинные гербы российских городов [Ancient coats of arms of Russian cities]. Страницы истории нашей Родины (in Russian). Moscow: Nauka.
- Думин, С.В. (1991). "Гербы городов Смоленского воеводства Речи Посполитой" [Coats of arms of the towns of the Smolensk Voivodeship of the Polish-Lithuanian Commonwealth]. Вестник геральдиста (in Russian) (1).
- Trubachyov, Oleg (2005). "Смоленские мотивы" [Smolensk motifs]. В поисках единства: взгляд филолога на проблему истоков Руси [In search of unity: a philologist's view on the problem of the origins of Russia] (in Russian). Comp. Г. А. Богатова, И. Б. Еськова, И. Г. Панова; Ин-т рус. яз. им. В. В. Виноградова РАН (3rd, supp. ed.). Moscow: Nauka. pp. 124—126. ISBN 5-02-033259-3.
- Ражнёв, Г.В. (1993). "Герб Смоленска" [Coat of arms of Smolensk]. Край Смоленский (in Russian) (1). Smolensk: Библиотека журнала «Край Смоленский». ISSN 0868-7242.
  - Ражнёв, Г.В. (1993). "Тайны и загадки птицы Гамаюн" [Secrets and mysteries of bird Gamayun]. Гербовед (in Russian) (1): 13–25.
  - Ражнёв, Г.В. "Когда был учрежден Смоленский герб?" [When was the coat of arms of Smolensk established?] (in Russian). Союз геральдистов России. Archived from the original on 2008-05-17.
- Воротников, Ю.Л. (2003). Слова и время [Words and time]. Научно-популярная литература (in Russian). Moscow: Nauka. pp. 45–47. ISBN 5-02-032682-8.
  - Воротников, Ю.Л. (2008). "Алконост, Сирин, Гамаюн или Райские птицы Древней Руси" [Alkonost, Sirin, Gamayun or Birds of Paradise of Ancient Russia]. Народное творчество (in Russian) (4): 58–61. ISSN 0235-5051.
  - Воротников, Ю.Л. (2008). "Алконост, Сирин, Гамаюн или Райские птицы Древней Руси" [Alkonost, Sirin, Gamayun or Birds of Paradise of Ancient Russia]. Народное творчество (in Russian) (5): 61–64. ISSN 0235-5051.
