= Timeline of Moscow =

Coordinates: 55.75°N 37.616667°E

The following is a timeline of the history of the city of Moscow, Russia.

== Prior to 16th century ==
- 1147 – Yuri Dolgoruki had a meeting with Sviatoslav Olgovich in a place called Moscow. First mentioning about Moscow in manuscript.
- 1237 – The 'grad of Moscow' destroyed by the Mongols.
- 1272 – Daniil Aleksandrovich becomes Grand Prince of Moscow.
- 1283 – Grand Duchy of Moscow territory established.
- 1300 – The Kremlin, or fort, was enclosed by a strong wall of earth and timber.
- 1303 – Yuriy Danilovich becomes Grand Prince of Moscow.
- 1325 – Seat of "metropolitan of Central Russia" relocated to Moscow.
- 1327 – Uspensky Church consecrated.
- 1328 – Ivan I becomes Grand Prince of Moscow.
- 1333 – St. Michael cathedral built.
- 1339 – The 'grad of Moscow' rebuilt in oak.
- 1341 – Simeon Ivanovich Gordyi becomes Grand Prince of Moscow.
- 1353 – Ivan II becomes Grand Prince of Moscow.
- 1358 – Chudov Monastery founded.
- 1362 – Dmitry Donskoy becomes Grand Prince of Moscow.
- 1367 – Moscow Kremlin (citadel) founded.
- 1369 – Moscow besieged.
- 1382 – Siege of Moscow (1382).
- 1386 – Nativity Convent (Rozhdestvensky convent) founded.
- 1389
  - Vasily I becomes Grand Prince of Moscow.
  - Ascension Convent founded in the Kremlin (approximate date).
- 1397
  - Sretensky Monastery founded.
  - Blagovyeshchensk Cathedral built.
- 1425 – Vasily II becomes Grand Prince of Moscow.
- 1462 – Ivan III becomes Grand Prince of Moscow.
- 1479 – Dormition Cathedral built in the Kremlin.
- 1491 – Spasskaya Gate built.
- 1492 – Palace of Facets (Granovitaya Palata) – state banqueting hall.
- 1495 – "Dungeons built under the Kremlin's Trinity Tower."

== 16th–17th centuries ==
- 1502 – 14 April: Coronation of Ivan III as Grand Prince of Moscow.
- 1505 – Vasili III becomes Grand Prince of Moscow.
- 1508 – Cathedral of the Archangel and Ivan the Great Bell Tower built.
- 1520 – Moscow said to contain "45,000 houses and 100,000 inhabitants".
- 1524/5 – Novodevichy Convent constructed.
- 1533 – Ivan the Terrible becomes Grand Prince of Moscow.
- 1547
  - City becomes capital of the grand duchy of Russia.
  - Fire.
- 1555 – Muscovy Trading Company of England active.
- 1560 – Saint Basil's Cathedral built.
- 1564 – Ivan Fyodorov (printer) active; Moscow Print Yard established.
- 1571 – City taken by Tartar forces from Crimea.
- 1576 – Paper mill established.
- 1591 – Donskoy Monastery founded.
- 1593 – Bely Gorod wall built.
- 1598 – Time of Troubles (ended 1613).
- 1600 – Zaikonospassky monastery founded.
- 1601 – Famine.
- 1611 – City taken by forces of Sigismund III of Poland.
- 1612 – Moscow Uprising of 1612.
- 1636 – Kazan Cathedral consecrated.
- 1652
  - Nativity Church at Putinki built.
  - German Quarter developed near city.
- 1656 – Church of the Twelve Apostles dedicated in the Kremlin.
- 1661 – Saviour Cathedral built.
- 1662 – Copper Riot.
- 1672 – Chorina Comedy Theatre is founded.
- 1682 – Moscow Uprising of 1682.
- 1687 – Greek Latin School established.
- 1689 – Moscow Theological Academy Library established.
- 1692 – Vysokopetrovsky Monastery katholikon (church) built.
- 1698 – Streltsy Uprising.

== 18th century ==
- 1701 – Sukharev Tower built.
- 1702 – Public theatre active.
- 1703
  - Vedomosti newspaper begins publication.
  - Peter the Great "encounters opposition" in Moscow which compels him to leave.
- 1708 – Moscow Governorate established.
- 1712 – Russian capital relocated from Moscow to Saint Petersburg.
- 1721 – Moscow Synodal Choir founded.
- 1728 – Russian capital moved back to Moscow under influence of the Supreme Privy Council.
- 1732 – Russian capital relocated back to Saint Petersburg.
- 1735 – Tsar Bell cast.
- 1739 – Fire.
- 1742 – Rampart built.
- 1748 – Fire.
- 1750 – Population: (approx) 150,000.
- 1752 – Fire.
- 1755 – Imperial University founded.
- 1764 – Foundling Hospital built.
- 1764 – Moscow Orphanage founded.
- 1765 – Novodevichii Institute founded.
- 1765 – Maiden Field Theatre founded.
- 1766 – Russian Theatre founded.
- 1769 – Znamensky Theatre founded.
- 1771
  - Chudov Monastery re-built.
  - Plague.
  - September: Plague Riot.
  - Vvedenskoye Cemetery in use (approximate date).
- 1772 – Commercial School founded.
- 1773 – Catherine Palace reconstruction begins.
- 1775 – Platon Levshin becomes Metropolitan of Moscow.
- 1777 – Preobrazhenskoye Cemetery inaugurated near city.
- 1780 – Petrovsky Palace founded.
- 1782 – Police Board established.
- 1786 – Pashkov House built.
- 1787 – Senate House built.
- 1790 – Peterburskoye Schosse road paved.
- 1792 – Tverskaya Square laid out.

== 19th century ==
- 1805 – Moscow Society of Naturalists founded.
- 1806 – Maly Theatre founded.
- 1809 – Shchepkin Theatre School established.
- 1812
  - French invasion.
  - September: Fire of Moscow (1812).
  - Population: 250,000
- 1816 – Kremlin rebuilt.
- 1817 – Excise office built.
- 1821 – Philaret Drozdov becomes Metropolitan of Moscow.
- 1823 – Alexander Garden laid out.
- 1825 – Bolshoi Theatre opens.
- 1830 – Moscow Craft School established.
- 1849 – Grand Kremlin Palace built.
- 1851
  - Moscow – Saint Petersburg Railway begins operating.
  - Saint Petersburg railway station and Kremlin Armoury building constructed.
- 1856
  - The Russian Messenger (literary magazine) begins publication.
  - Tretyakov Gallery initiated.
- 1861
  - Petushki–Moscow railway built.
  - Public museum established.
- 1862
  - Nizhny Novgorod-Moscow railway built.
  - Rumiantsev Library established.
  - Moscow Yaroslavsky railway station built.
- 1864 – Kazansky railway station opens.
- 1865
  - Golitzyn museum established.
  - Industrial exhibit held.
  - Tolstoy's War and Peace begins publication in The Russian Messenger.
- 1866 – Moscow Conservatory and Moscow Merchant Bank founded.
- 1867 – Einem brothers chocolate factory founded.
- 1868 – Borodinsky Bridge built.
- 1870 – Belorussky railway station opens.
- 1871
  - Trade Bank founded.
  - Population: 611,970.
- 1872
  - State Historical Museum founded.
  - Moscow University for Women founded.
- 1877 – Premiere of Tchaikovsky's Swan Lake ballet.
- 1878 – Sokolniki Park established.
- 1880 – Pushkin statue installed in Strastnaya Square.
- 1882 – Population: 753,469.
- 1883
  - Cathedral of Christ the Saviour consecrated.
  - Redesign of coat of arms of Moscow adopted.
- 1885 – Private Opera established.
- 1887 – Morozovtsi Orekhovo-Zuevo Moskva (football club) formed.
- 1891 – May: French exhibit opens.
- 1892 – City Hall built.
- 1893 – Bazaar built in Kitay-Gorod.
- 1894 – Moscow Hermitage Garden opens.
- 1896
  - 26 May: Coronation of Nicholas II.
  - 30 May: Khodynka Tragedy.
  - December: Student demonstration.
  - Museum of History of Moscow founded.
  - Kursky railway station built.
- 1897
  - Russian Electrical Theatre (cinema) opens.
  - Population: 988,610.
- 1898
  - Moscow Art Theatre founded.
  - All-Russia Insurance Company building constructed.
  - Novodevichy Cemetery inaugurated.
- 1899
  - 6 April: First electric Moscow tram begins operating.
  - 7 November: Premiere of Chekhov's Uncle Vanya.
  - Moscow City Chess Championship active.
  - "Student agitation" begins.
- 1900
  - Paveletsky railway station built.
  - Population: 1,023,817.

== 20th century ==
=== 1900s–1940s ===
- 1901 – Rizhsky railway station built.
- 1902 – Savyolovsky railway station built.
- 1903
  - Zimin Opera founded.
  - Hotel National in business.
- 1904
  - 29 June: 1904 Moscow tornado.
  - Yaroslavsky railway station rebuilt.
- 1905 – Moscow Uprising of 1905.
- 1907
  - Moscow Little Ring Railway begins operating.
  - Hotel Metropol built.
  - Population: 1,359,254.
- 1908 – Moscow Public University established.
- 1912
  - Durov Animal Theater founded.
  - Museum of Fine Arts opens.
  - Borodinsky Bridge rebuilt.
- 1913
  - Spaso House (residence) built.
  - Population: 1,817,100.
- 1914 – Shchukin Theatre Institute founded.
- 1916 – Automobile Moscow Society factory established.
- 1917 – 25 October-2 November: Moscow Bolshevik Uprising.
- 1918
  - March: City becomes capital of the Russian Soviet Federative Socialist Republic.
  - July: Left SR uprising.
  - Moscow Soviet of People's Deputies established.
  - Kiyevsky railway station built.
  - Izvestia newspaper in publication.
- 1919
  - March: Founding Congress of the Comintern held.
  - Moscow State Jewish Theater established.
- 1920 – Treaty of Moscow (1920)
- 1921
  - Moscow Children's Theatre opens.
  - Moscow Institute of Oriental Studies established.
- 1921 – Treaty of Moscow (1921)
- 1922 – Moscow Sport Circle (football club) formed.
- 1923 – Moscow Municipal Council of Professional Unions theatre founded.
- 1924
  - Lenin Mausoleum established.
  - All-Union Radio begins broadcasting.
- 1925
  - Lenin Library active.
  - Yermolova Theatre founded.
- 1928 – Rusakov Workers' Club and Zuev Workers' Club buildings constructed.
- 1929
  - Moscow Oblast and Moscow Circus School established.
  - Kauchuk Factory Club built.
- 1930 – Moscow State Institute for History and Archives and Moscow Institute of Steel and Alloys established.
- 1934 – Museum of Architecture founded.
- 1935
  - 15 May: Moscow Metro begins operating.
  - Hotel Moskva in business.
- 1936
  - Moscow Trials begin in the House of the Unions.
  - 2 May: Premiere of Prokofiev's Peter and the Wolf.
- 1937
  - Smolensky Metro Bridge built.
  - Volga-Moscow canal opens.
- 1938 – Gorbunov Palace of Culture (concert hall), Bolshoy Kamenny Bridge, and Bolshoy Ustinsky Bridge built.
- 1939 – Population: 4,137,018.
- 1941 – October: Battle of Moscow begins.
- 1942 – January: Battle of Moscow ends.
- 1943 – Laboratory No. 2 of the USSR Academy of Sciences established.
- 1945 – 24 June: Moscow Victory Parade of 1945.
- 1948 – Museum of Lenin's funeral train founded.

=== 1950s–1990s ===
- 1953 – 5 March: Joseph Stalin dies.
- 1954 – Hotel Leningradskaya built.
- 1957
  - Moscow Central Clinical Hospital opened.
  - City hosts Ice hockey world championship
  - City hosts 6th World Festival of Youth and Students.
- 1959
  - Moscow International Film Festival officially starts with its debut edition.
  - Population: 5,032,000.
  - 24 July: Nixon–Khrushchev Kitchen Debate occurs at the American National Exhibition.
- 1960
  - Peoples' Friendship University founded.
  - Moscow Ring Road is the new city border. Tushino, Babushkin, Perovo, Kuntsevo, Lyublino became parts of Moscow.
  - Over five million Muscovites are vaccinated in order to end the 1959–1960 Moscow smallpox outbreak.
- 1961
  - Rossiya Cinema built.
  - October: American Committee for Non-Violent Action peace walkers arrive in Moscow.
- 1962
  - Moscow City Archives established.
  - Moscow Domodedovo Airport opens.
- 1963 – Nuclear Test Ban Treaty signed in Moscow.
- 1964 – Taganka Theatre founded.
- 1965 – Population: 6,366,000.
- 1966 – Gorizont Cinema opens.
- 1968 – 25 August: 1968 Red Square demonstration.
- 1970 – Population: 6,941,961.
- 1971 – Great Moscow State Circus auditorium opens.
- 1979
  - Spartak Tennis Club built.
  - Moscow Virtuosi orchestra formed.
- 1980 – 1980 Summer Olympics held.
- 1981 – Moscow International Peace Marathon begins.
- 1982 – Satyricon Theatre opens its doors.
- 1985 – Population: 8,642,000.
- 1988 – Moscow People's Front organized.
- 1989
  - August: Moscow Music Peace Festival.
  - Population: 8,967,332.
- 1990
  - Gavriil Kharitonovich Popov becomes mayor.
  - Moscow Federation of Trade Unions and Sobinbank founded.
  - Kremlin Cup tennis tournament begins.
- 1991
  - August: 1991 Soviet coup d'état attempt.
  - Moscow Chamber of Commerce and Russian State University for the Humanities established.
  - Prix Benois de la Danse (ballet contest) begins.
- 1992
  - Moscow Interbank Currency Exchange and Russian Institute of Strategic Studies established.
  - Yury Luzhkov becomes mayor.
  - Moscow Times English-language newspaper begins publication.
  - Figure Skating Federation of Russia headquartered in city.
- 1993
  - Moscow designated capital of the Russian Federation per Constitution.
  - TV-6 begins broadcasting.
  - Moscow City Duma and American Center in Moscow founded.
  - Kazan Cathedral reconstructed.
- 1995
  - Arch Moscow exhibit begins.
  - Hungry Duck bar in business.
  - Monument erected in Victory Park.
- 1996 – 11 November: Kotlyakovskoya Cemetery bombing.
- 1997
  - Memorial Mosque built on Poklonnaya Hill.
  - Moscow Marathon Luzhniki begins.
- 1999 – September: Apartment bombing.
- 2000 – City becomes part of the Central Federal District.

== 21st century ==
- 2002 – 23–26 October: Moscow theater hostage crisis.
- 2003
  - Moscow International Performing Arts Centre opens.
  - 9 December: 2003 Red Square bombing.
  - Federation Tower construction begins.
- 2004
  - Moscow Monorail begins operating.
  - Grand Prix of Moscow cycling race begins.
  - February 2004 Moscow Metro bombing.
  - 18 May: Gulag History Museum opens
  - August 2004 Moscow Metro bombing.
- 2005
  - Moscow Biennale of Contemporary Art begins.
  - 2 July: Live 8 concert, Moscow held in Red Square.
- 2006
  - 21 August: 2006 Moscow market bombing.
  - Protest against ban of Moscow Pride.
  - IgroMir (gaming exhibit) begins.
  - Triumph Palace erected in the Sokol neighborhood.
- 2007
  - Museum of Soviet Arcade Machines established.
  - Naberezhnaya Tower built.
- 2009
  - City of Capitals built.
  - Eurovision Song Contest held.
  - Kirill becomes Patriarch of Moscow and all Russia.
- 2010
  - 29 March: 2010 Moscow Metro bombings.
  - Vladimir Resin becomes mayor, succeeded by Sergey Sobyanin.
- 2011
  - 24 January: Domodedovo International Airport bombing.
  - Moscow Exchange established.
- 2012 – March: Arrest of Pussy Riot (musical group) performers.
- 2013
  - 8 September: Moscow mayoral election, 2013.
- 2014 – Peace Procession against war in Ukraine
  - Population: 11,794,282.
- 2015
  - 27 February: Politician Nemtsov assassinated.
- 2016 – 10 September: Moscow Central Ring of the Little Ring of the Moscow Railway begins operating.
- 2018
  - 5 May – Cossack consplayers attacking to people, mainly to scholars.
  - FIFA World Cup 2018 in Russia. Luzhniki and Spartak stadiums host matches.
- 2020
  - August – Destroying of the Moscow trolley system.

== See also ==
- History of Moscow
- List of heads of Moscow
- List of metropolitans and patriarchs of Moscow
- List of theatres in Moscow
- Timelines of other cities in the Central Federal District of Russia: Smolensk, Voronezh

== Bibliography ==
=== Published in 16th–18th centuries ===
- Richard Hakluyt (1903), "(Citie of Mosco)", The Principal Navigations Voyages Traffiques & Discoveries of the English Nation, vol. 2, Glasgow: James MacLehose and Sons (First published in 1589)
- Thomas Nugent (1749), "Moscow", The Grand Tour, vol. 2: Germany and Holland, London: S. Birt, hdl:2027/mdp.39015030762572
- William Coxe (1784), "Moscow", Travels into Poland, Russia, Sweden and Denmark, London: Printed by J. Nichols, for T. Cadell, OCLC 654136
- Richard Brookes (1786), "Moscow", The General Gazetteer (6th ed.), London: J.F.C. Rivington

=== Published in 19th century ===
- Abraham Rees (1819), "Moscow", The Cyclopaedia, London: Longman, Hurst, Rees, Orme & Brown
- Jedidiah Morse; Richard C. Morse (1823), "Moscow", A New Universal Gazetteer (4th ed.), New Haven: S. Converse
- Conrad Malte-Brun (1827), "(Moscow)", Universal Geography, vol. 6, Edinburgh: Adam Black
- David Brewster, ed. (1830). "Moscow". Edinburgh Encyclopaedia. Edinburgh: William Blackwood.
- Josiah Conder (1830), "Moscow", The Modern Traveller, vol. Russia, London: J.Duncan
- Francis Coghlan (1834). Guide to St. Petersburgh and Moscow. London.
- Linney Gilbert (c. 1845), "Moscow", Russia Illustrated, London, OCLC 17246545
- Charles Knight, ed. (1867). "Moscow". Geography. Vol. 3. London. hdl:2027/nyp.33433000064802.
- George Henry Townsend (1867), "Moscow", A Manual of Dates (2nd ed.), London: Frederick Warne & Co.
- William Henry Overall, ed. (1870), "Moscow", Dictionary of Chronology, London: William Tegg, OCLC 2613202
- W. Pembroke Fetridge (1874), "Moscow", Harper's Hand-Book for Travellers in Europe and the East, New York: Harper & Brothers
- Maturin Murray Ballou (1887), "(Moscow)", Due North; or, Glimpses of Scandinavia and Russia, Boston, USA: Ticknor and Company
- "Moscow". Hand-book for Travellers in Russia, Poland, and Finland (4th ed.). London: John Murray. 1888.
- William Oliver Greener (1900), The Story of Moscow, Mediaeval Towns, London: J.M. Dent & Co., OL 7120046M

=== Published in 20th century ===
- "Moscow". Chambers's Encyclopaedia. London. 1901.
- Annette M.B. Meakin (1906). "Moscow". Russia, Travels and Studies. London: Hurst and Blackett. OCLC 3664651.
- Kropotkin, Peter Alexeivitch; Bealby, John Thomas (1910). "Moscow" . Encyclopædia Britannica. Vol. 18 (11th ed.). pp. 891–894.
- Benjamin Vincent (1910), "Moscow", Haydn's Dictionary of Dates (25th ed.), London: Ward, Lock & Co.
- Vasily Klyuchevsky (1911), "(Moscow)", A History of Russia, translated by C. J. Hogarth, London: Dent
- Nathaniel Newnham Davis (1911), "Moscow", The Gourmet's Guide to Europe (3rd ed.), London: Grant Richards
- Ruth Kedzie Wood (1912). "Moscow". The Tourist's Russia. New York: Dodd, Mead and Company. OCLC 526774.
- Nevin O. Winter (1913). "The Muscovite Capital". The Russian Empire of To-day and Yesterday. Boston: L.C. Page.
- "Moscow". Russia with Teheran, Port Arthur, and Peking. Leipzig: Karl Baedeker. 1914. OCLC 1328163.
- Francis Whiting Halsey, ed. (1914). "Moscow". Russia, Scandinavia, and the Southeast. Seeing Europe with Famous Authors. Vol. 10. Funk & Wagnalls Company – via HathiTrust.
- Walter Graebner (11 January 1943). "Moscow Today". Life. USA.
- W.A. Robson, ed. (1954). "Moscow". Great Cities of the World: their Government, Politics and Planning. Routledge. p. 383+. ISBN 978-1-135-67247-8.
- Arthur Voyce (1964), Moscow and the Roots of Russian Culture, USA: University of Oklahoma Press, OCLC 1333562, OL 5911839M
- Aleksandr Avdeenko (1968), "Moscow", From Moscow to Yalta (Guide for Motorists), Moscow: Novosti Press Agency Publishing House, OCLC 74861, OL 24952498M
- "Moscow: The City Around Red Square", National Geographic Magazine, vol. 153, Washington DC, 1978
- "Moscow", Russia, Ukraine & Belarus, Australia: Lonely Planet, 1996, p. 192+, OL 16478112W
- Olga Gritsai and Herman van der Wusten (2000). "Moscow and St. Petersburg, a sequence of capitals, a tale of two cities". GeoJournal. 51 (1/2): 33–45. doi:10.1023/A:1010849220006. JSTOR 41147495. S2CID 154264277.

=== Published in 21st century ===
- Benjamin Forest; Juliet Johnson (2002). "Unraveling the Threads of History: Soviet-Era Monuments and Post-Soviet National Identity in Moscow". Annals of the Association of American Geographers. 92 (3): 524–547. doi:10.1111/1467-8306.00303. JSTOR 1515475. S2CID 6663929.
- "Moscow". Understanding Slums: Case Studies for the Global Report 2003. United Nations Human Settlements Programme and University College London. 2003.
- Roman A. Cybriwsky (2013). "Moscow". Capital Cities around the World: An Encyclopedia of Geography, History, and Culture. ABC-CLIO. p. 197+. ISBN 978-1-61069-248-9.
- Alexander M. Martin (2013). Enlightened Metropolis: Constructing Imperial Moscow, 1762–1855. Oxford University Press. ISBN 978-0-19-960578-1.
