= Timeline of Smolensk =

The following is a timeline of the history of the city of Smolensk, Russia.

== Prior to 20th century ==
Historical affiliations

Kievan Rus' 882–1054
Principality of Smolensk 1054–1387
Grand Duchy of Lithuania 1387–1514
Grand Duchy of Moscow 1514–1547
Tsardom of Russia 1547–1618
Polish–Lithuanian Commonwealth 1618–1667
Tsardom of Russia 1667–1721
Russian Empire 1721–1917
Belarusian People's Republic 1918–1919
Soviet Russia 1919–1922
Soviet Union 1922–1941
Nazi Germany 1941–1943
Soviet Union 1943–1991
Russian Federation 1991–present

- 1137 - Russian Orthodox Diocese of Smolensk established.
- 1150 - Assumption Cathedral consecrated.
- 1408 - Smolensk becomes part of the Grand Duchy of Lithuania.
- 1508 - Smolensk becomes capital of the Smolensk Voivodeship.
- 1514 - 1 August: Siege of Smolensk (1514); Moscow in power.
- 1602 - Smolensk Kremlin built.
- 1609 - Siege of Smolensk (1609–11) by Polish forces begins near city.
- 1611 - Siege of Smolensk (1609–11) ends; Poles in power.
- 1613 - Siege of Smolensk (1613–17) begins.
- 1631 - Władysław IV Vasa-funded Royal Bastion (citadel) completed.
- 1632 - October: Siege of Smolensk (1632–33) begins.
- 1636 - Polish Roman Catholic Diocese of Smolensk established.
- 1654 - Siege of Smolensk (1654) and Russians retook power.
- 1667 - Smolensk becomes part of Russia per Truce of Andrusovo.
- 1674 - Assumption Cathedral building demolished.
- 1772 - Assumption Cathedral rebuilt.
- 1804 - Birth of Mikhail Glinka Russian classical musician.
- 1812 - August: Battle of Smolensk (1812); city taken by French forces.
- 1868 - Smolensk railway station opened.
- 1870 - Moscow–Brest Railway opens.
- 1878 - Smolenskii Vestnik newspaper begins publication.
- 1885 - Glinka Monument (Smolensk) unveiled.
- 1888 - Smolensk State Museum founded.
- 1894 - Polish church built.
- 1897 - Population: 46,889.
- 1900 - Population: 57,405.

== 20th century ==
- 1901 - Tram begins operating.
- 1913 - Population: 76,000.
- 1917 - Labor strikes.
- 1918 - Smolensk State University established.
- 1926 - Smolensk Aviation Plant established.
- 1936 - Zadneprovsky City District, Smolensk of city established.
- 1937
  - City becomes part of the Smolensk Oblast.
  - Smolensk Oblast Children's Puppet Theatre established.
- 1939 - Smolensk Regional Philharmonic orchestra established.

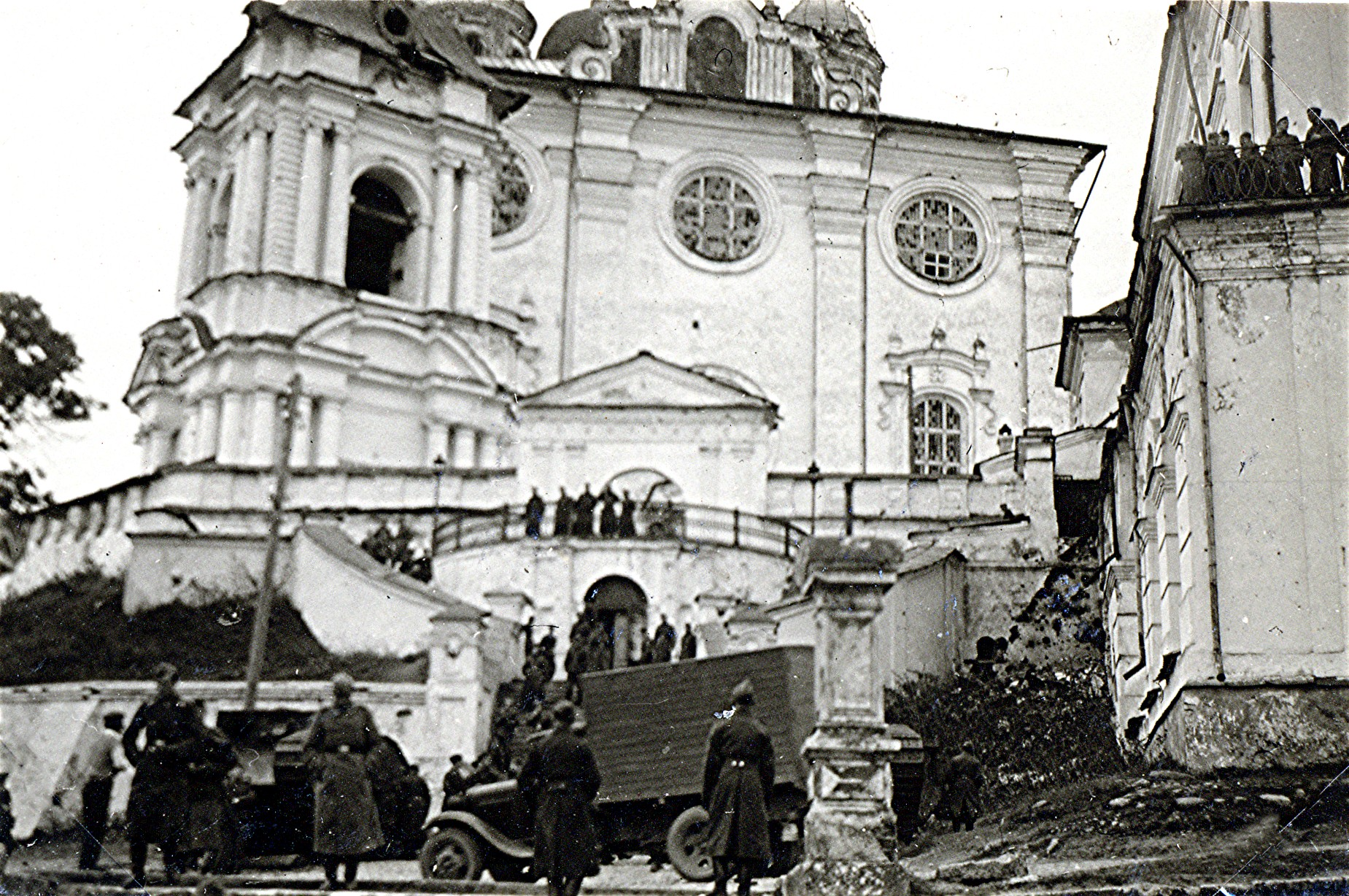
German troops in Smolensk in 1941

- 1941
  - July–August: Battle of Smolensk (1941).
  - 20 July: Forced labour camp No. 126 for Zivilarbeiters established by the Germans.
  - July: Dulag 240 transit camp for prisoners of war relocated from Jabłonna to Smolensk.
  - November: Dulag 240 transit camp for POWs relocated from Smolensk to Rzhev.
- 1942
  - Cinema opens.
  - July: Forced labour camp for Jewish men established by the Germans.
- 1943
  - August–October: Battle of Smolensk (1943).
  - 25 September: Forced labour camps for Zivilarbeiters and Jews dissolved.
- 1954 - Glinka Festival begins.
- 1961 - Moscow Power Engineering Institute, Smolensk branch established.
- 1963 - Kristall Production Corporation (diamonds) and Smolensk 1100th Anniversary Park established.
- 1965
  - Industrial City District, Smolensk established.
  - Population: 183,000.
- 1979 - Leninsky City District, Smolensk established.
- 1985 - Population: 331,000.
- 1988 - Smolensk Philharmonic Hall in use.
- 1989 - Population: 341,483.
- 1992 - Football Club Kristall Smolensk formed.
- 1995 - Tvardovsky statue unveiled in Victory Park, Smolensk.
- 1998
  - Ivan Averchenkov becomes mayor.
  - Aleksandr Prokhorov (politician) becomes governor of Smolensk Oblast.
- 2000 - City becomes part of the Central Federal District.

== 21st century ==
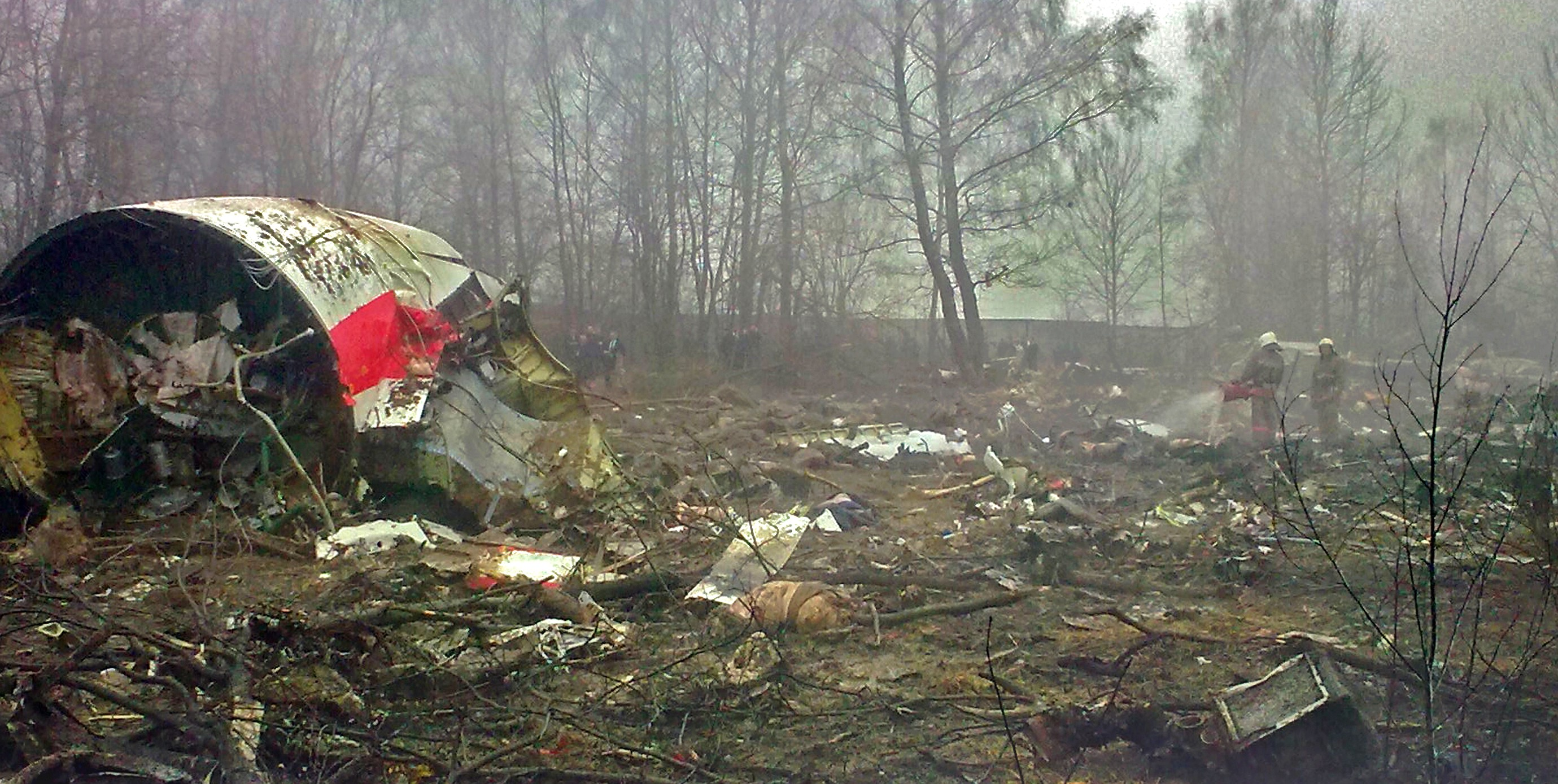
Smolensk air disaster, 2010

- 2002
  - Viktor Maslov (politician) becomes governor of Smolensk Oblast.
  - Smolensk Archive relocated to Russia from the US.
- 2003 - Vladislav Khaletsky becomes mayor.
- 2004 - Football Club Dnepr Smolensk formed.
- 2010
  - 10 April: Smolensk air disaster; Polish president Lech Kaczyński killed.
  - Population: 326,863.

== See also ==
- Smolensk history
- Timelines of other cities in the Central Federal District of Russia: Moscow, Voronezh

== Bibliography ==
- William Coxe (1784), "Smolensko", Travels into Poland, Russia, Sweden and Denmark, London: T. Cadell, OCLC 654136
- "Smolensk (town)" . Encyclopædia Britannica. Vol. 25 (11th ed.). 1910. p. 278.
- "Smolensk", Russia, Leipzig: Karl Baedeker, 1914, OCLC 1328163
- William Henry Beable (1919), "Smolensk", Russian Gazetteer and Guide, London: Russian Outlook
- Merle Fainsod (1958). Smolensk Under Soviet Rule. Harvard University Press. (research utilizing the Smolensk Archive)
- Michael C. Hickey (2001). "Rise and fall of Smolensk's moderate socialists: the politics of class and rhetoric of crisis in 1917". In Donald J. Raleigh (ed.). Provincial Landscapes: Local Dimensions of Soviet Power, 1917–1953. University of Pittsburgh Press. p. 14+. ISBN 978-0-8229-7061-3.
- Laurie R. Cohen (2013). Smolensk Under the Nazis: Everyday Life in Occupied Russia. University of Rochester Press. ISBN 978-1-58046-469-7.
