= Ivan Sergeyevich Gorbachyov =

Russian Major-General

- Native name: Иван Сергеевич Горбачёв
- Born: 29 October 1902; Strechanovo, Roslavlsky Uyezd, Smolensk Governorate, Russian Empire
- Died: 25 July 1941 (aged 38) Demyakhi, Belsky District, Smolensk Oblast, Soviet Union
- Allegiance: Soviet Union
- Branch: NKVD Border Troops; Red Army
- Service years: 1924–1941
- Rank: Major general
- Commands: 250th Rifle Division
- Conflicts: World War II; Battle of Smolensk †
- Awards: Order of the Red Star

Ivan Sergeyevich Gorbachyov (Russian: Иван Сергеевич Горбачёв; 29 October 1902 – 25 July 1941) was a Red Army major general.

Born in a poor peasant family, Gorbachyov joined the Red Army after the end of the Russian Civil War. He became an officer in the NKVD Border Troops and commanded a border detachment in 1941. After the German invasion of the Soviet Union in June 1941, Gorbachyov became the commander of the newly formed 250th Rifle Division, which included many personnel of the Border Troops. Gorbachyov led the division during the Battle of Smolensk and died of wounds received in a counterattack.

== Early life ==
Gorbachyov was born in Strechanovo, Tyuninsky volost, Roslavlsky Uyezd, Smolensk Governorate, to an impoverished peasant family. He worked as a farm labourer. His family moved to Kamensk in Ukraine after the 1905 Revolution for economic reasons and Gorbachyov graduated from a gymnasium school there. His father became a factory worker in Kamensk, joining the Bolsheviks and participating in the Russian Revolution. Gorbachyov worked as a teacher in rural schools in the villages of Shepetovo and Kharinovo in Oryol Governorate from January 1921, and in October 1922 became a clerk in the military department of the Tyunininsky volost executive committee.

== Interwar ==
Gorbachyov joined the Red Army on 30 December 1923, becoming a Red Army man and serving as a squad leader in the 80th Rifle Regiment of the 27th Rifle Division. He was sent to study at the 26th Ivanovo-Voznesensk Infantry School in September 1924, where he was starshina of his company. Upon graduation two years later, Gorbachyov was appointed assistant chief of a border outpost of the 37th Batumi Border Detachment of the OGPU Border Troops. From March 1927 he served with the 41st Nakhchivan Border Detachment as an assistant commissioner, then as assistant commandant for secret operations units in February 1931, and in February 1932 became commander of a border sector. During this period, Gorbachyov participated in the suppression of anti-Soviet bandits in Shakhtakhty and Karabaglyar raions of Nakhichevan between January and March 1930.

In June 1934, Gorbachyov became a student at the Frunze Military Academy, from which he graduated in September 1937. In October 1937, he became chief of staff of the 2nd Railroad Brigade NKVD in the Transbaikal Military District at Chita, serving as acting commander of the brigade between 1 January and 21 July 1938. Receiving a promotion to major on 27 September of that year, he became commander of the 54th Border Detachment in Nerchinskozavodsk on 20 October 1938. On 14 February 1941, Gorbachyov was awarded the Order of the Red Star on the occasion of the twentieth anniversary of the Border Troops. The commander of NKVD forces in the Transbaikal district assessed him as a "mature and serious commander" who was firm, decisive, and disciplined.

== World War II ==
After Operation Barbarossa, the German invasion of the Soviet Union, began on 22 June 1941, several new rifle divisions were formed under the command of officers from the NKVD Border Troops. Gorbachyov was among those officers and on 27 June was appointed commander of the 250th Rifle Division, which began formation in Vladimir soon after. The officers were drawn from the NKVD Border Troops, while the enlisted men were called-up reservists. The 250th was relocated to the Rzhev area on 15 July, the same day that Gorbachyov was promoted to major general. From there the division marched through Olenino to positions south of Belyi. The division was assigned to the 30th Army and entered the Battle of Smolensk on 22 July, counterattacking towards Dukhovshchina to stop the German advance. Two days later, Gorbachyov and the division commissar visited elements of the 250th at Demyakhi. As Gorbachyov left the staff car that they arrived in at the entrance to the village and went to personally inspect the defenses, he was mortally wounded by shrapnel from a German artillery shell. Gorbachyov died of his wounds in a field hospital on the next day, and was buried in Olenino.

== Personal life ==
Gorbachyov married and had a daughter, Galina, and two sons, Pyotr and Vladimir.
