= Roslavl–Novozybkov offensive =

Red Army offensive during World War 2

- Part of the Eastern Front of World War II, Battle of Smolensk
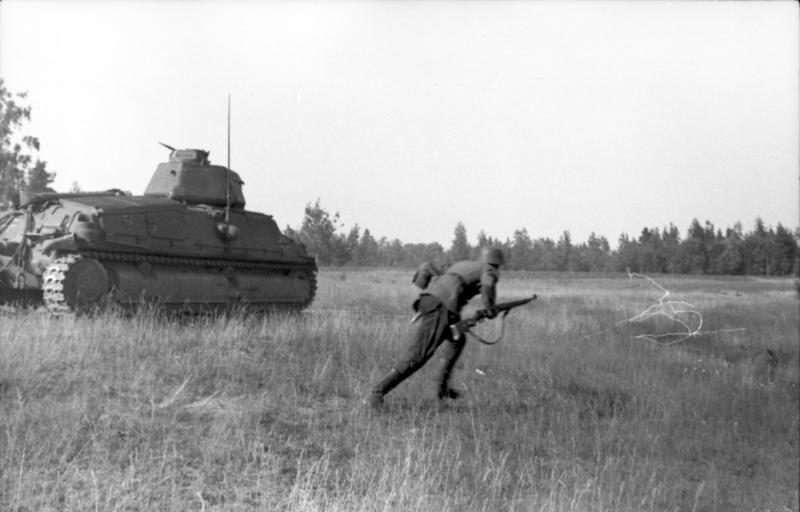
Date	30 August–12 September 1941
Location	Bryansk and Sumy Oblasts, Soviet Union
Result	German victory

Belligerents
Soviet Union	Germany

Commanders and leaders
(Soviet Union) Andrey Yeryomenko	(Nazi Germany) Heinz Guderian; (Nazi Germany) Maximilian von Weichs

Units involved
Bryansk Front: 3rd Army; 13th Army; 21st Army; 50th Army	2nd Panzer Group; 2nd Army

Strength
261,696 men; 259 tanks	Unknown

Casualties and losses
Official figures: 50,972 killed, captured or missing; 28,603 wounded or sick; Unofficial figures including replacements: around 100,000 casualties; more than 140 tanks	8,261 men; no more than 50 tanks permanently destroyed; Including 2nd Army: around 20,000 casualties

The Roslavl–Novozybkov offensive (Russian: Рославльско-Новозыбковская наступательная операция, lit. 'Roslavl–Novozybkov offensive operation') was an offensive conducted by the Red Army's Bryansk Front against the German 2nd Panzer Group and 2nd Army in Bryansk Oblast and parts of Sumy Oblast on the Eastern Front of World War II between 30 August and 12 September 1941, part of the Battle of Smolensk in Soviet historiography.

The offensive was an attempt by Andrey Yeryomenko's Bryansk Front to destroy Heinz Guderian's 2nd Panzer Group after it turned south towards Kiev. The offensive failed as a result of armor dispersion and poor intelligence, and the 2nd Panzer Group inflicted heavy casualties on the front's forces, significantly weakening it in advance of Operation Typhoon, which began three weeks later. The German troops continued their advance southwards, resulting in the Kiev encirclement battle.

== Prelude ==
=== 29 August ===
On 28 August, the 2nd Panzer Group continued to advance southward, crossing the Desna River near Novgorod-Seversky and Korop by the end of the day. The Stavka ordered the Bryansk Front and Southwestern Front Air Forces to concentrate their aircraft on blocking the group's advance, but the aviation failed to halt the German troops. By the end of 29 August, XXIV Motorized Corps' 10th Motorized Division's lead Kampfgruppe had advanced 20 kilometers to the south, reaching positions to the north of the Seym River, 20 kilometers north of Bakhmach, and engaging elements of the 40th Army's 293rd Rifle Division in the Korop area and the 21st Army's 67th Rifle Corps along the Seym. At the same time, the 3rd Panzer Division reached Glukhov's western approaches, 50 kilometers southeast of the Desna at Novgorod-Seversky, where it ran into 40th Army's main body, including the 10th Tank Division and the 5th Antitank Brigade.

Behind the 10th Motorized and 3rd Panzer, the 4th Panzer Division of the XXIV Corps and the 17th Panzer and 29th Motorized Division of XXXXVII Motorized Corps were echeloned to the rear at Novgorod-Seversky and west of Trubchevsk. The 4th Panzer was fighting 13th Army's 52nd Cavalry Division in the Novgorod-Seversky area and the army's main forces west of Trubchevsk. Farther to the rear, the 18th Panzer Division of the XXXXVII Corps was quickly moving southward from Roslavl while mopping up stragglers from the 13th Army in 2nd Panzer Group's rear west of the Desna.

To the west of the 2nd Panzer Group, infantry divisions of Maximilian von Weichs's 2nd Army pushed the remnants of Vasily Kuznetsov's 21st Army and the old 3rd Army towards Chernigov, while eliminating the 21st Army remnants surrounded in a large salient pocket northeast of Chernigov and north of the Desna. The 21st Army and old 3rd Army were part of the Bryansk Front.

== Opposing forces ==
XXIV Motorized Corps, commanded by Leo Geyr von Schweppenburg, had a daily operational strength of roughly 320 tanks (including 128 Panzer III and Panzer IV tanks, with the rest being Panzer I, Panzer II, and command tanks) which was well below half of its strength at the beginning of Operation Barbarossa. Kuzma Podlas' 40th Army, which became part of the Southwestern Front on 26 August, was responsible for defending the front's right flank and maintaining contact with the Bryansk Front on its right. It included the 135th Rifle Division, the 293rd Rifle Division, 10th Tank Division, 2nd Airborne Corps, and the 5th Anti-Tank Brigade.
