= Battle of Smolensk (1941) =

Battle on the Eastern Front of World War II

Coordinates: 54°46′58″N 32°02′43″E

Battle of Smolensk (1941) First Battle of Smolensk
- Part of Operation Barbarossa during the Eastern Front of World War II
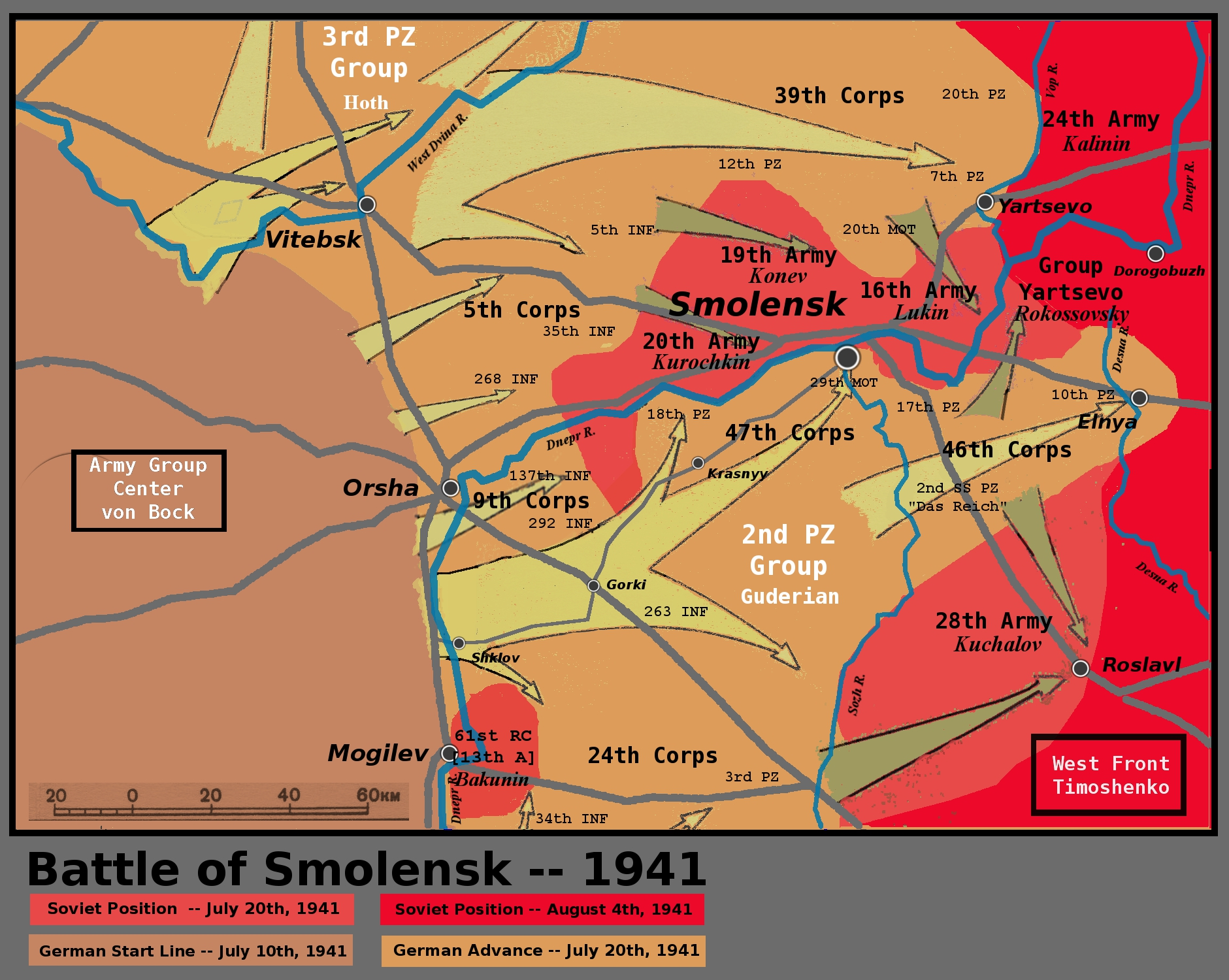
- German and Soviet movements near Smolensk, 10 July – 4 August
Date	8–31 July 1941 (German historiography); 10 July – 10 September 1941 (Soviet historiography)
Location	Smolensk (Russian SFSR) vicinity, Soviet Union
Result	German victory

Belligerents
Germany	Soviet Union

Commanders and leaders
Fedor von Bock; Hermann Hoth; Heinz Guderian; Adolf Strauss; Maximilian von Weichs	Semyon Timoshenko; Fyodor Kuznetsov; Andrei Yeremenko; Ivan Gorbachyov †; Konstantin Rokossovsky

Strength
430,000 men 1,000 tanks 1,500 aircraft 6,600 guns and mortars	Initially on 10 July: 581,600 men or 883,000; 1,545 tanks^{[a]} 6,000 guns Total: 1,991,000 men

Casualties and losses
~115,500 (KIA, WIA, MIA) (10 July – 10 September); Other data: 135,659 men (21 July – 10 September): 29,650 killed; 100,327 wounded; 5,682 missing; 214 tanks destroyed	Modern Western estimate: 724,000 KIA and MIA (including 565,000 POW), 274,000 WIA; Total: 998,000; Krivosheev's official Soviet data: 759,974 wounded or dead: 486,171 irrecoverable losses (KIA, MIA, POW); 273,803 wounded; 1,348 tanks and SPGs destroyed 903 aircraft destroyed 3,120 guns destroyed

The first Battle of Smolensk (German: Kesselschlacht bei Smolensk, lit. 'Cauldron-battle at Smolensk') was a battle during the second phase of Operation Barbarossa, the Axis invasion of the Soviet Union, in World War II. It was fought around the city of Smolensk between 10 July and 10 September 1941, about 400 km (250 mi) west of Moscow. The Ostheer had advanced 500 km (310 mi) into the USSR in the 18 days after the invasion on 22 June 1941.

The Soviet 16th, 19th and the 20th armies were encircled and destroyed just to the east of Smolensk, though many of the men from the 19th and 20th armies managed to escape the pocket. While the battle was a stunning operational success for the Germans, the rapid advances into Soviet territory led to supply and logistics crises of increasing severity, as German supply lines were stretched to their limit. The Soviet counter-attacks, while ultimately unsuccessful, did cause a slowdown of the attacking Germans and bought the Soviets crucial time.

Following the Smolensk encirclement, much of Army Group Centre became mired in positional warfare, suffering significant losses in defensive battles throughout the late summer of 1941. These factors seriously depleted the offensive strength of the German divisions, and contributed to the disastrous setbacks later suffered in the Battle of Moscow in December 1941.

== Background and planning ==
On 22 June 1941, the Axis nations invaded the Soviet Union in Operation Barbarossa. At first, the campaign found spectacular success, as the surprised Soviet troops were not able to offer coordinated resistance. After three weeks of fighting, the Germans had reached the Dvina and Dnieper rivers and planned for a resumption of the offensive. The main attack, aimed at Moscow, was carried out by Army Group Centre (Fedor von Bock). Its next target enroute to the Soviet capital was the city of Smolensk. The German plan called for the 2nd Panzer Group (later 2nd Panzer Army) to cross the Dnieper, closing on Smolensk from the south, while the 3rd Panzer Group (later 3rd Panzer Army) was to encircle the town from the north.

After their initial defeats, the Red Army began to recover and took measures to ensure a more determined resistance, with a new defensive line established around Smolensk. Stalin placed Field Marshal Semyon Timoshenko in command and transferred five armies out of the strategic reserve to Timoshenko. These armies had to conduct counter-offensives to blunt the German drive. The German high command (OKW) was not aware of the Soviet build-up until they encountered them on the battlefield.

Facing the Germans along the Dnieper and Dvina rivers were stretches of the Stalin Line fortifications. The defenders were the 13th Army of the Western Front and the 20th Army, 21st Army and the 22nd Army of the Soviet Supreme Command (Stavka) Reserve. The 19th Army was forming up at Vitebsk, while the 16th Army was arriving at Smolensk.

In Soviet histories, the great Battle (Srazheniye)^{[b]} of Smolensk (10 July – 10 September 1941) is divided into the following phases and operations:

- Smolensk Defensive Operation (10 July – 10 August 1941)
- Smolensk Offensive Operation (21 July – 7 August 1941)
- Rogechev-Zhlobin Offensive Operation (13–24 July 1941)
- Gomel-Trubchevsk Defensive Operation (24 July – 30 August 1941)
- Dukhovschina Offensive Operation (17 August – 8 September 1941)
- Yelnia Offensive Operation (30 August – 8 September 1941)
- Roslavl-Novozybkov Offensive Operation (30 August – 12 September 1941)

The German Oberkommando des Heeres (OKH) lists the following operations around Smolensk:

- Battle of Smolensk (8 July – 5 August 1941)
- Defensive battle near Smolensk and Yelnya (26 July – 1 October 1941)
- Battle of Roslavl (1–9 August 1941)
- Battle of Krichev and Gomel (9–20 August 1941)
- Battle of Velikiye Luki (22–27 August 1941)

== The operation ==
=== Phase One: The encirclement battle, and the first Soviet counterattacks ===
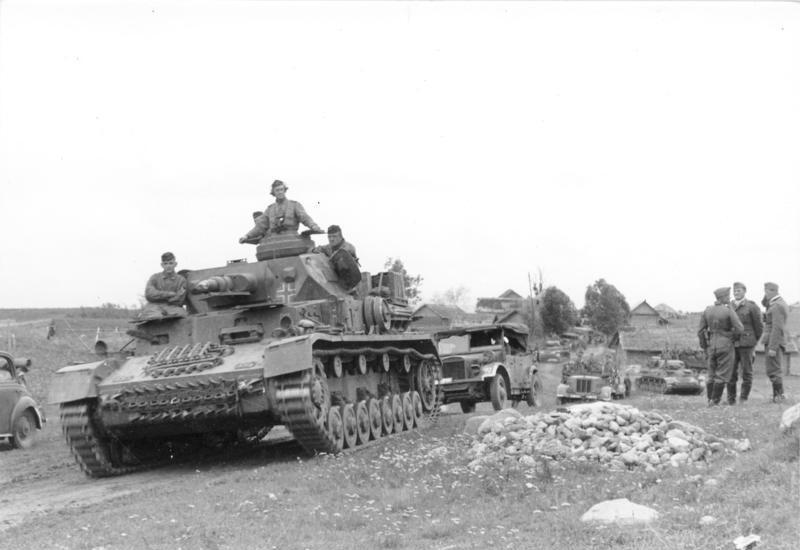
German vehicle column near Vitebsk in July 1941

Prior to the German attack, the Soviets launched a counter-offensive; on 6 July, the 7th and 5th Mechanized Corps of the Soviet 20th Army attacked with about 1,500 tanks near Lepiel. The result was a disaster, as the offensive ran directly into the anti-tank defenses of the German 7th Panzer Division and the two Soviet mechanized corps were virtually wiped out.

On 10 July, Guderian's 2nd Panzer Group began a surprise attack over the Dnieper, his forces overran the weak 13th Army and by 13 July, Guderian had passed Mogilev, trapping several Soviet divisions. His spearhead unit, the 29th Motorised Division, was already within 18 km (11 mi) of Smolensk. The 3rd Panzer Group had attacked, with the 20th Panzer Division establishing a bridgehead on the eastern bank of the Dvina river, threatening Vitebsk. As both German panzer groups drove east, the 16th, 19th and 20th armies faced the prospect of encirclement west of Smolensk. From 11 July, the Soviets tried a series of concerted counter-attacks. The Soviet 19th Army and 20th Army struck at Vitebsk, while the 21st and the remnants of the 3rd Army attacked against the southern flank of 2nd Panzer Group near Bobruisk.

Several other Soviet armies also attempted to counter-attack in the sectors of the German Army Group North and Army Group South. This effort was apparently part of an attempt to implement the Soviet prewar general defense plan. The Soviet attacks managed to slow the Germans but the results were so marginal that the Germans barely noticed them as a large coordinated defensive effort and the German offensive continued.

Hoth's 3rd Panzer Group drove north and then east, parallel to Guderian's forces, taking Polotsk and Vitebsk. The 7th Panzer Division and 20th Panzer Division reached the area east of Smolensk at Yartsevo on 15 July. At the same time, the 29th Motorized Division, supported by the 17th Panzer Division broke into Smolensk, captured the city except for the suburbs and began a week of house-to-house fighting against counter-attacks by the 16th Army. Guderian expected that the offensive would continue towards Moscow as its main focus and sent the 10th Panzer Division to the Desna River to establish a bridgehead on the east bank at Yelnya and cleared that as well by the 20th. This advanced bridgehead became the center of the Yelnya Offensive, one of the first big coordinated Soviet counter-offensives of the war.

This objective (Yelnya) was 70 km (43 mi) south of the Dnieper and well clear of the objective of liquidating the armies trapped at Smolensk. Under Fuhrer Directive 33 issued on 14 July, the main effort of the Wehrmacht was re-orientated away from Moscow towards a deep encirclement of Kiev in Ukraine and Bock was becoming impatient, wanting Guderian to strike north and link up with Hoth's Panzer Group so resistance in the city could be mopped up.

On 27 July, Bock held a conference at Novy Borisov, which was also attended by Commander-in-Chief Walther von Brauchitsch, the head of the OKH, the High Command of the Army. The generals were required to sit without an opportunity to comment, while a memorandum was read to them by one of Brauchitsch's aides, instructing them that they were to strictly follow Fuhrer Directive 33 and were under no circumstance to try to push further east. They were ordered to concentrate on mopping up, refurbishing equipment, restocking supplies and straightening the German front line, which had become more of an "S" shape, due to the advances of Guderian and Hoth. Coming away from this meeting, Hoth and Guderian were angry and frustrated. Guderian wrote in his journal that night that Hitler "preferred a plan by which small enemy forces were to be encircled and destroyed piecemeal and the enemy thus bled to death. All the officers who took part in the conference were of the opinion that this was incorrect". Whether or not this was true, it was this meeting that some have pointed to that marked a critical point where the Wehrmacht leadership broke trust with Hitler. After returning to his post, Guderian conspired with Hoth and Bock to "delay the implementation" of Directive 33, in defiance of the orders of the Fuhrer and OKH. Guderian hastily put together a plan of attack for his and Hoth's forces for 1 August, the Roslavl-Novozybkov Offensive Operation.

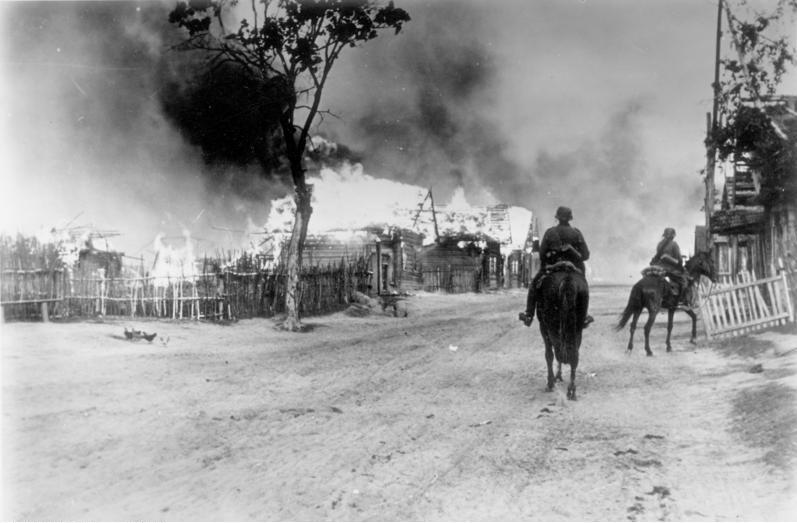
German soldiers on horseback in a burning village near Mogilev at the Dnieper. The Red Army has been driven out by German artillery fire.

In the north, the 3rd Panzer Group was moving much more slowly. The terrain was swampy, made worse by rain and the Soviets were fought to escape the trap. On 18 July, the armored pincers of the two panzer groups came within 16 km (9.9 mi) of closing the gap. Timoshenko put newly promoted Konstantin Rokossovsky, who had just arrived from the Ukrainian front, in charge of assembling a stopgap force, which held the attack of the 7th Panzer Division and with continuous reinforcements, temporarily stabilized the situation. The open gap allowed Soviet units to escape that were then pressed into service, holding the gap open.

The Soviets transferred additional troops from newly formed armies into the region around Smolensk, namely the 29th, 30th, 28th, and 24th Armies. These newly built formations would, immediately upon arrival, start a heavy counter-attack against the German forces around the Smolensk area from 21 July on. This put a heavy strain on the overextended Panzer forces, which had to cover a large area around the perimeter. However, poor coordination and logistics on the part of the Soviets allowed the Germans to successfully defend against these offensive efforts, while continuing to close the encirclement. The Soviet attacks would last until 30 July, when the Germans finally repelled the last of them.

Finally, on 27 July, the Germans were able to link up and close the pocket east of Smolensk, trapping large portions of 16th, 19th, and 20th Armies. Under the leadership of 20th Army, Soviet troops managed to break out of the pocket in a determined effort a few days later, assisted by the Soviet offensive efforts along the Smolensk front line. On 5 August von Bock reported that a total of 309,000 prisoners had been captured during the Battle of Smolensk at all. This number later increased to 350,000. Thus, only about 50,000 people from the encircled 16th and 20th armies escaped from the "cauldron" by 7 August.

=== Phase Two: The German offensives on the flanks and the further Soviet counteroffensives ===
After the battle for encirclement near Smolensk ended on 5 August, the opponents drew different conclusions. The Soviet command was satisfied that they managed to restore the front line on the road to Moscow and save part of the encircled armies. It was decided to continue to strike at the opposing German forces, despite high losses. Thus, from their point of view, the battle was just beginning. In the following month, there were two major Soviet offensives: 6–24 August and 29 August – 12 September 1941.

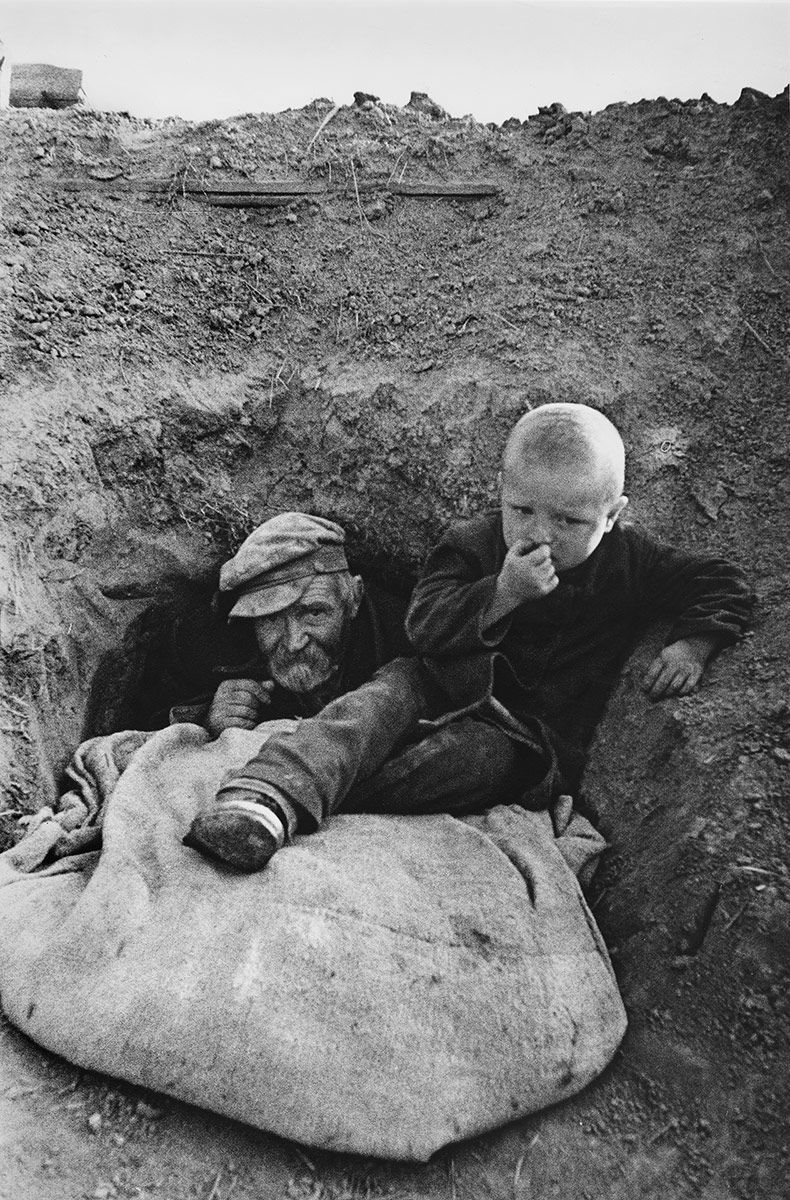
Collective farmer Savely Stepanchenko and his grandson, residents of a village near Dorogobuzh, in a shelter that they used to hide from German soldiers

Soviets did make progress and pushed Germans back, but movement forward was rather slow. The main reason for this was the quality of German defense. Soviets small unit tactics were implemented with depleted companies even before the operation began, as seen on the example of the 900th Rifle Regiment, which was part of the 242nd Rifle Division. Rifle Regiment attacking village of Svity was composed of 79 rifles (soldiers able to attack the enemy).

Staying on small unit tactics, switch to night operations yielded good results and Soviets were not only able to close in on enemy positions but to push the Germans back in close combat. Clandestine movement to get as close as possible to the German positions, quiet sprint to the positions, and engagement, including rifle fire and bayonet attack. Attacks on this sector would be supported by artillery, both anti-aircraft used in ground role and divisional level support in the form of Artillery Support Group (ASG) 900.

German small unit opposing the 900th Rifle Regiment at this time were the elements of the 240th Infantry Regiment of the 106th Infantry Division, and 900 Mechanized Lehr Brigade and its Panzerjäger 1 tank destroyers. After initial night attack described above, the Germans adjusted and began counterattacking and winning the ground they would lose earlier in the night, inflicting heaviest casualties in 25 July to 5 August. Heavy casualties were by Soviet small unit leader's assessments, not by current assessments of Western historians. Specifics: 200 Soviet soldiers involved in the night attack which was not successful. 5th Rifle Company (of 2nd Rifle Battalion, 900th Rifle Regiment) reported 18 MIA, 11 wounded. The 519th Anti-Aircraft Artillery Battalion which was attacking the German positions with it reported 4 KIA, 7 WIA from that one attack. Total 7 KIA, 18 MIA, 18 WIA.

This is radically different than assessments made before about the methodology of Soviet attacks and how the casualties were sustained versus Germans in general. Lets look at this in detail. First reason for this discovery may be in that the Soviet regimental, company, and personal documents of soldiers are not usually examined, and the small unit losses would be extrapolated from divisional level, at best. Most quality authors would be doing small unit combat loss assessments from statistical analysis of Krivosheev's work on Soviet combat losses, which is a very large data set Front, STAVKA and above level. Extrapolations from large data sets led them to the conclusion that the attacks themselves were a lot bloodier than they actually were due to losses sustained from bombings and artillery bombardments, or many other scenarios which caused legitimate Soviet divisional level losses, for example. Another reason still, is the fact that some Soviet units would be attacking over the span of days, resulting in accumulation of losses over time, and not sustaining it in a single attack. In other words, tip of the Soviet spear may have been being blunted at a slower rate, while casualties around the area would be attained by other means as well. Soviet small unit attack methodologies may of not been as ignorant or casualty producing as originally thought.

Back to the operational level. On the part of the Germans, opinions were divided: von Bock believed that the battle was over, and after rest and replenishment, the troops of Army Group Center could continue their successful offensive against Moscow. However, Hitler was preoccupied with the stubborn defense of the Soviet Southwestern Front near Kiev and the increasing resistance of the Soviet troops of Zhukov and Timoshenko in the Moscow direction. On the other hand, Guderian's victory at Roslavl, on the right flank of Army Group Center, opened up the possibility of an attack to the south and a gigantic encirclement of Soviet troops near Kiev. Gradually, OKH leaned towards Hitler's opinion. However, neither Bock nor Hitler planned an immediate offensive directly on Moscow, and the need to constantly repel Soviet strikes exhausted the troops. Von Bock wrote: "I was now forced to commit all of my combat-capable divisions from the army group’s reserve into combat…. We needed every man forward… In spite of huge losses… the enemy attacked daily in several sectors so that, up to this time, it has not been possible to regroup forces and bring up reserves."

Thus, in the next month after the elimination of the "cauldron" near Smolensk, von Bock's armies defended themselves in the center and attacked with limited forces on the flanks. In the south, Guderian won the battles near Gomel and Krichev, and in the north, Group Stumme captured Velikiye Luki and advanced further to the east to Andreapol. Most of the attacks of the Soviet troops were successfully repelled, but the Germans had to be withdrawn from the salient near Yelnya.

== Casualties and losses ==
Official Soviet data on losses in the Battle of Smolensk (10 July – 10 September 1941) were disclosed only in 1993. According to the study by a team of authors led by Grigori F. Krivosheev, the troops of the four "fronts" and the Soviet Pinsk Naval Flotilla lost a total of:

- 486,171 people irrevocably (dead, missing and captured)
- 273,803 people wounded.
- In total: 759,947 people.

What part of the 486,171 irrecoverable losses relates to the killed and what part to the prisoners-of-war is not indicated. The Germans reported the following number of prisoners for some operations during this time:

- 350,000 after the final cleaning of the pocket near Smolensk (including battles at Rogachev and at Mogilev)
- 38,561 after the destruction of Group Kachalov near Roslavl
- 78,000 captured by the 2nd Army in the battles of Krichev and Gomel
- 16,000 captured by the XXIV Motorized Corps of the 2nd Panzer Group between Krichev and Gomel
- 34,000 captured by Group Stumme near Velikiye Luki

Thus, there are more than 500,000 reported prisoners in total.

Based on an analysis of Soviet documents and archives, Nigel Askey, in his study of Soviet military losses in 1941–1945, argues that official Soviet data on military losses in the First Battle of Smolensk is greatly underestimated. Actual casualties amount to 1,000,000 men, including 565,000 prisoners.

The losses of the German side, according to one of the documents from the Russian archives, amounted to only 101,000 men. Historian David Glantz draws attention to the fact that the number of killed for the 9th Army in this document is obviously too low. In his opinion, this number should be 7,000 higher. His own estimate of the personnel losses of Army Group Center for the period from 10 July to 10 September, made on the base of known German documents, gives around 115,500 killed and wounded, compared with the 760,000 losses the Soviet fronts incurred during the same period.

== Aftermath ==
During the battle, the German army captured the Archives of Smolensk Oblast Committee of Communist Party of the Soviet Union, a large amount of documents about local history from 1917 to 1941. The Germans used the document for propaganda about Soviet repression and transported them back to Germany.

In the immediate aftermath of the capture of Smolensk, German forces rounded up all Jewish inhabitants and confined them to local and regional ghettos, and later extermination. The city would enter an unconditional and constant period of martial law until the Soviets liberated the city two years later.

The Battle of Smolensk was another severe defeat for the Red Army in the opening phase of Operation Barbarossa. For the first time, the Soviets tried to implement a coordinated counter-attack against a large part of the front; although this counter-attack turned into a military disaster, the stiffening resistance showed that the Soviets were not yet defeated and that the Blitzkrieg towards Moscow was not going to be an easy undertaking. Dissent within the German high command and political leadership was exacerbated. The leaders of the General Staff, Franz Halder and Brauchitsch and commanders like Bock, Hoth and Guderian counselled against dispersing the German armoured units and to concentrate on Moscow. Hitler reiterated the lack of importance of Moscow and of strategic encirclements and ordered a concentration on economic targets such as Ukraine, the Donets Basin and the Caucasus, with more tactical encirclements to weaken the Soviets further. The German offensive effort became more fragmented, leading to the Battle of Kiev and the Battle of Uman. The battles were German victories but costly in time, men and equipment on their approach towards Moscow, allowing the Soviets time to prepare the defenses of the city.

== Notes ==
- ^{a} David Glantz wrote that "although the two [7th and 5th Soviet] mechanized corps fielded a total of over 1,500 tanks on paper, it is likely as many as two-thirds of their tanks broke down due to mechanical problems even before they reached the battlefield".
- ^{b} In Soviet and post-Soviet military historiography, the term "srazheniye" traditionally describes the complex of battles, that take place on a wide front and consist of a number of separate battles and operations linked by the general plan. The term "bitva" (that also translates as a "battle") refers to the most important events. In the historiography of the Great Patriotic War, the Battle of Moscow, the Battle of Stalingrad and the Battle of Kursk are known. A certain struggle is being waged for the recognition of the operations in the Rzhev area as a "bitva".

== Bibliography ==
- Clark, Alan (1965). Barbarossa: The Russian–German Conflict, 1941–45. New York: Morrow. ISBN 0-688-04268-6.
- Evans, Richard J. (2008). "2". The Third Reich At War. London & New York: Penguin. ISBN 978-0-14-101548-4.
- Glantz, David M. (2010). Barbarossa Derailed, Volume 1: The German advance to Smolensk, the encirclement battle, and the first and second Soviet counteroffensives, 10 July–24 August 1941. Solihull, England: Helion & Company. ISBN 978-1-906033-72-9.
- Glantz, David M. (2012). Barbarossa Derailed, Volume 2: The German Offensives on the Flanks and the Third Soviet Counteroffensive, 25 August–10 September 1941. Solihull, England: Helion & Company. ISBN 978-1-906033-90-3.
- Glantz, David M. (1995). When Titans Clashed: How the Red Army Stopped Hitler. Lawrence: University Press of Kansas. ISBN 0-7006-0899-0.
- Goldovt-Ryzhenkov, David; Timchenko, Konstantin (2 October 2014). "Derailing Barbarossa: 900th Rifle Regiment's First Combat Engagements". The Journal of Slavic Military Studies. 27 (4): 639–652. doi:10.1080/13518046.2014.963433. ISSN 1351-8046. S2CID 145589075.
- Klink, Ernst (1998). "The Conduct of Operations: The Army and Navy". In Boog, Horst; Förster, Jürgen; Hoffmann, Joachim; Klink, Ernst; Müller, Rolf-Dieter; Ueberschär, Gerd R. (eds.). The Attack on the Soviet Union. Germany and the Second World War. Vol. IV. Translated by McMurry, Dean S.; Osers, Ewald; Willmot, Louise. Militärgeschichtliches Forschungsamt (Military History Research Office (Germany)). Oxford: Clarendon Press. pp. 941–1020. ISBN 0-19-822886-4.
- Krivosheev, Grigori F. (1997). Soviet Casualties and Combat Losses in the Twentieth Century. London: Greenhill Books. ISBN 1-85367-280-7.
- Statyuk, Ivan (2006). Смоленское сражение 1941 [The Battle of Smolensk, 1941] (in Russian). Moscow: Tseykhgauz. ISBN 5-9771-0017-5.
- Stolfi, R. H. S. (1993). Hitler's Panzers East: World War II Reinterpreted. Oklahoma City: University of Oklahoma Press. ISBN 0-8061-2581-0.
- Ziemke, Earl F. (1987). Moscow to Stalingrad. Center of Military History, United States Army. ISBN 978-0880292948.
