= Timeline of Voronezh =

The following is a timeline of the history of the city of Voronezh, Russia.

== Prior to 20th century ==
- 1586 - Fortress established.
- 1590 - Fort burned by Tatars.
- 1694 - Shipbuilding begins.
- 1703 - Fire.
- 1748 - Fire.
- 1773 - Fire.
- 1802 - Theatre troupe established.
- 1826 - Stone Bridge, Voronezh opens.
- 1833 - Braun's music shop in business (approximate date).
- 1860 - Tsar Peter I monument erected.
- 1868
  - Rostov-on-Don-Voronezh railway begins operating.
  - Koltsov memorial erected.
- 1871
  - Moscow-Voronezh railway begins operating.
  - Koltsovsky Park opens.
- 1876 - Rostov-Voronezh railway begins operating.
- 1897 - Population: 84,015.

== 20th century ==
- 1901 - Population: 84,146.
- 1913 - Population: 94,800.
- 1918
  - Voronezh State University established.
  - Sirena literary journal begins publication.
- 1926 - Population: 120,017.
- 1928 - City becomes part of the Central Black Earth Region.
- 1933 - Kramskoy Museum of Fine Arts opens.
- 1934
  - City becomes part of the newly established Voronezh Oblast.
  - Tsentralnyi Profsoyuz Stadion (Voronezh) (stadium) built.
- 1937 - Voronezh State University's B.M. Kozo-Polyansky Botanical Garden established.
- 1938 - Voronezh Dance Academy established.
- 1939 - Population: 326,836.
- 1947 - Football Club Fakel Voronezh formed.
- 1954 - Vogresovsky Bridge opens.
- 1959 - Chernavsky Bridge rebuilt.
- 1963 - Voronezh Modern Youth Theatre established.
- 1965 - Population: 576,000.
- 1968 - Voronezh State Opera and Ballet Theatre active.
- 1972 - Voronezh Airport begins operating.
- 1979 - Population: 809,000.
- 1985
  - North Bridge, Voronezh opens.
  - Population: 850,000.
- 1989 - 27 September: Alleged Voronezh UFO incident occurs.
- 1990 - Proposal for construction of nuclear plant quashed.
- 2000 - City becomes part of the Central Federal District.

== 21st century ==
- 2004
  - Boris Skrynnikov becomes mayor.
  - Bombings.
- 2008 - Sergey Koliukh becomes mayor.
- 2009
  - Annunciation Cathedral, Voronezh built.
  - Voronezh tram system is stopped.
- 2010 - Population: 889,680.

== See also ==
- Voronezh history
- History of Voronezh
- Timelines of other cities in the Central Federal District of Russia: Moscow, Smolensk

== Bibliography ==
- "Voronezh (town)" . Encyclopædia Britannica. Vol. 28 (11th ed.). 1910. p. 212.
- "Voronezh", Russia, Leipzig: Karl Baedeker, 1914, OCLC 1328163
- William Henry Beable (1919), "Voronezh", Russian Gazetteer and Guide, London: Russian Outlook
- Mike Bowker; Antje Grebner (2007). "Referendum on the Construction of a Nuclear Heating Plant in Voronezh in 1990: an Example of Grassroots Democracy in the Soviet Union". Slavonic and East European Review. 85 (3): 543–559. doi:10.1353/see.2007.0042. JSTOR 25479108. S2CID 152015984.
