= Fyodor Kon =

Russian architect and military engineer (fl. 1590s)

- Фёдор Конь
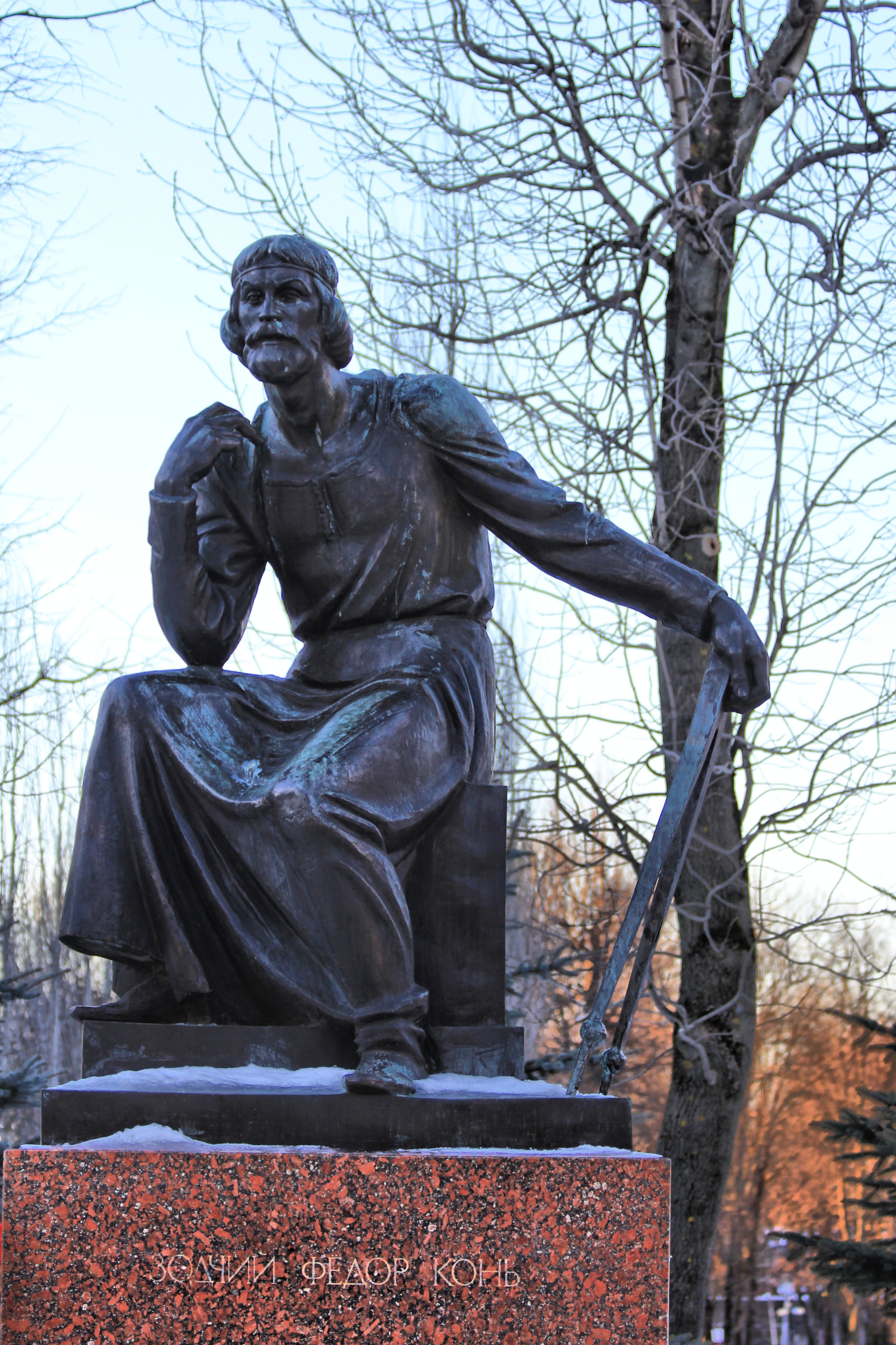
- Kon monument in Smolensk
- Occupation: Architect
- Buildings: Bely Gorod; Smolensk Kremlin

Fyodor Savelyevich Kon (Russian: Фёдор Саве́льевич Ко́нь; fl. 1585 – c. 1600) was a Russian military engineer and architect who built the Smolensk Kremlin (1597–1602) and the Bely Gorod fortification ring of Moscow (1585–1593).

== Biography ==
The exact year and circumstances of his birth and early years remain unknown. Kon, as a mature man, and his relatives living in Moscow appear to be affiliated with the Boldino Monastery near Dorogobuzh, as evidenced by records of their donations to the monastery. Thus, it is assumed that Kon's ancestors came to Moscow from the Dorogobuzh area.

The architect used the nickname Kon (Russian for stallion) as early as in 1584, as evidenced by his written plea to Ivan the Terrible. According to this account, Kon ran away to a "foreign land" and learned construction crafts there, specifically emphasizing his skills in fortifications like city walls, dams, ponds, moats, and "secrets" (tunnels). Kon received a public beating for his defection but was soon assigned to lead the construction of Bely Gorod, a 10-kilometer outer ring of Moscow fortress that stood in the path of present-day Boulevard Ring. His best known project, the Kremlin of Smolensk, was launched by Boris Godunov in 1597.

Fyodor Kon has been the subject of an eponymous poem by Dmitri Kedrin (1940).
