= American Center in Moscow =

- Американский Центр в Москве
- Formation: 1993; 32 years ago
- Type: Cultural/educational center
- Location: Novinskiy Bulvar, 21 Presnensky District, Moscow, Russia
- Coordinates: 55.756°N 37.618°E
- Website: amc.ru

The American Center in Moscow is a cultural center located at the Embassy of the United States, Moscow, Russia. It was founded in 1993 by the U.S. Embassy to the Russian Federation. The American Center serves as a focal point of American culture in Russia's capital and offers a variety of cultural and educational programs as well as access to print and online resources about the United States.

== General Information ==
The Moscow American Center is Russia's largest and oldest American Space, founded in 1993 to provide the public free information on the U.S. It hosts daily cultural and educational programs. The center was initially located at the Margarita Rudomino All-Russia State Library for Foreign Literature. In 2015, the center moved to the American Embassy.

The American Center gives access to a collection of English-language resources: print books, audio and visual materials, collection of the latest magazines from the U.S., virtual databases, recordings of American films and documentaries. The center offers regular U.S. Speaker Series lectures, as well as a variety of cultural events, clubs, film screenings, discussion groups, seminars for teachers of English and other English-language programs. All events are free of charge.

== EducationUSA ==
The American Center in Moscow hosts the Moscow EducationUSA Advising Center. EducationUSA offers complex advising services (i.e. workshops, webinars, lectures, individual consultations, pre-departure orientations, annual educational advising fair, etc.) on all steps of the application process to U.S. colleges and universities. It has a library of books and test prep materials which are available for students interested in getting higher education in the United States. The Center runs a Competitive College Club (CCC) - an intensive group advising program aimed to assist the best and brightest high school students in grades 9–10 to become competitive applicants to U.S. schools. All assistance is provided free of charge.
