= Smolensk Kremlin =

Historic fortress in Smolensk, Russia

Coordinates: 54°47′11″N 32°03′56″E

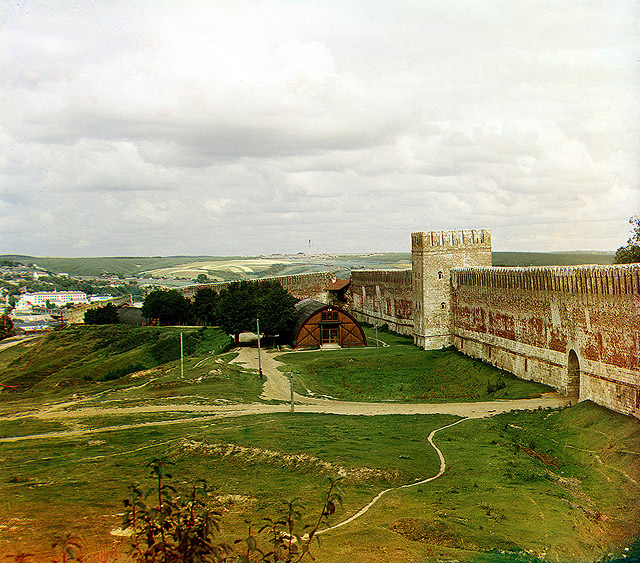
1912 photo of the Smolensk Wall by Sergey Prokudin-Gorsky.

The Smolensk Kremlin (Russian: Смоленский кремль) is a fortified complex (kremlin) enclosing the center of the city of Smolensk in western Russia. The partially preserved fortress wall was built between 1595 and 1602, during the reigns of the tsars Feodor I and Boris Godunov. The length of the walls is about 6.5 kilometres (4.0 mi), of which less than the half was preserved. The fortifications were built under the supervision of the architect Fyodor Kon. The Smolensk Kremlin is classified as an architectural monument protected at the federal level, and also has a great historical significance, in particular, as the fortress protecting the Russian state from the west over centuries.

== History ==
Scheme of the Smolensk Kremlin, the remaining parts of the walls are shown in blue

Smolensk historically had a great significance for the defence of Russia, and this is why Russian rulers paid considerable attention to its fortifications. In the spring of 1554, Tsar Ivan the Terrible ordered the building of a new tall wooden fortress. After the development of artillery, it became clear that a wooden fortress was no longer suitable for the defense, and at the end of the 16th century, it was decided to build a new stone fortress at the place of the old one.

In December 1595, the preparations for the construction started after the official decree was issued. The construction work was very intense and was performed daily from sunrise to sunset. The construction workers, however, lived in harsh conditions and revolted in 1599 because of hunger, cold, and disease. In the summer of 1597 long and heavy rains flooded all the trenches and ditches, and the construction workers had to strengthen the soil with piles to prevent landslides. In 1600, because of the heat and heavy rains, a large number of crops were lost in Russia, causing a famine.

The construction of the new fortress used the old existing fortifications; in some places the new wall was built on top of them, and in certain areas, the new fortress extended beyond the limits set by the old one. The construction started from the western side of the fortress.

== Towers and walls ==
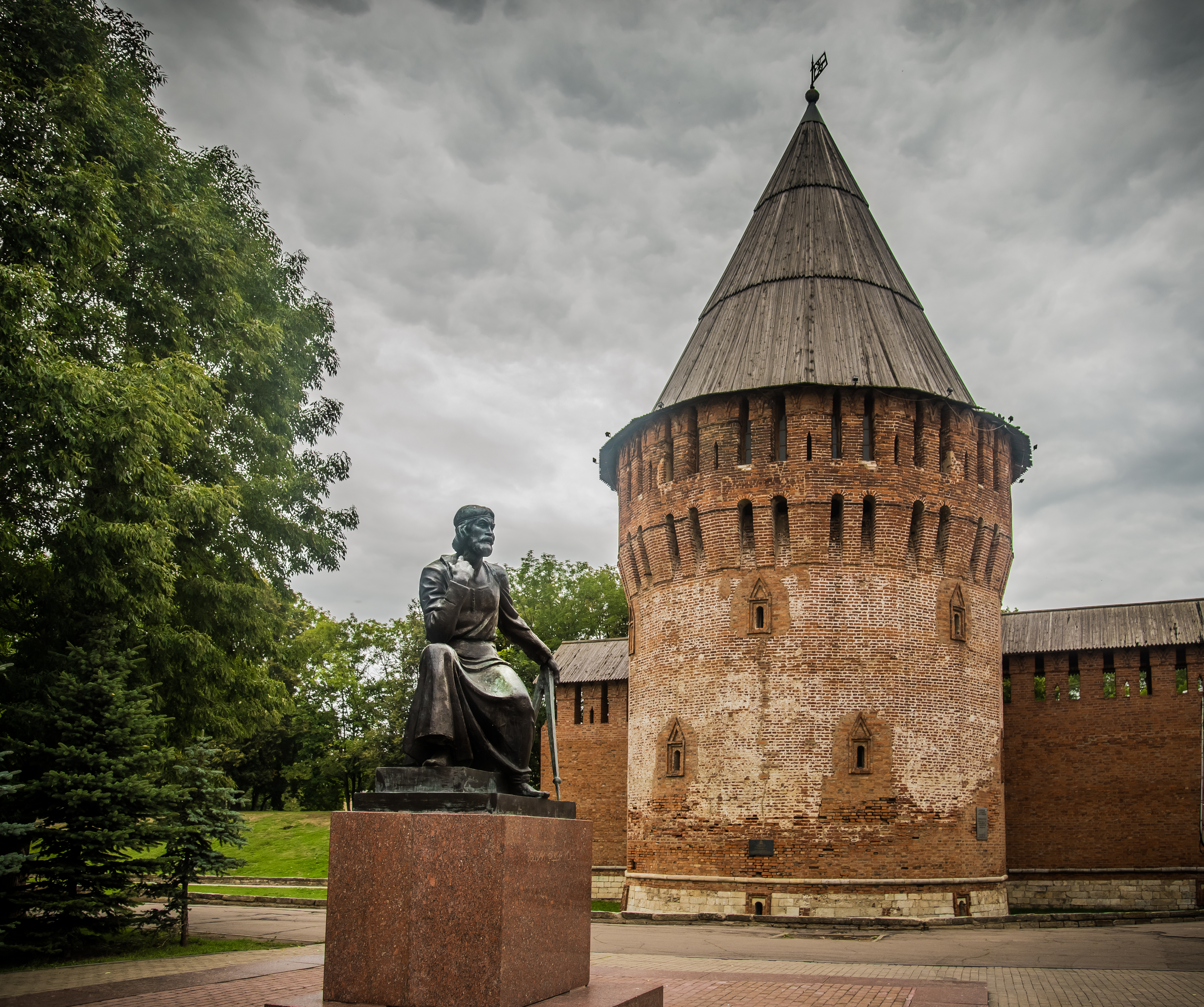
Monument to Fyodor Kon, the architect of the Smolensk Kremlin

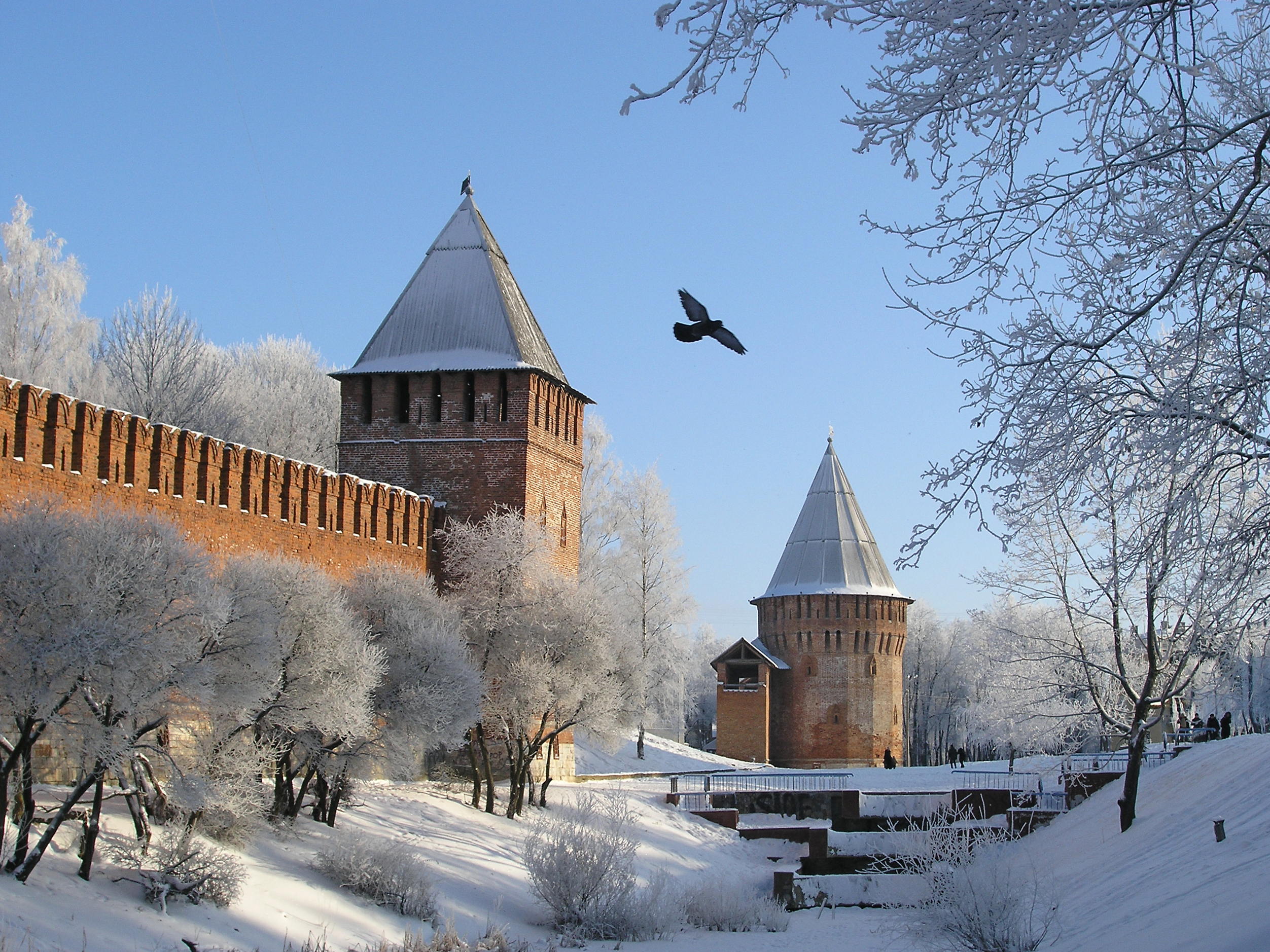
The walls of Smolensk in winter

Several sections of the wall survived, the eastern section with nine towers, the south-western section with five towers, and the northern section with three towers.

The most famous remaining tower is the round-cornered tower named Veselukha. This name was given to it because of the nice view which opens from the tower. In the daytime, citizens lead their guests to see the beautiful suburbs. However, in the evening time and especially during the night it is a rather dangerous place and has a bad reputation. Brave hearts who dare to appear at this place told about horror phantoms and ghosts. Finally it was found the reasonable explanation to that awful fact. This place was used by the counterfeiters who printed out false money and scared people who tried to walk around.

The Main Gate Tower was Frolovskaya (Dnieper Tower), through which was the exit to the capital of the Russian state. The second most important was Molohovskaya tower, opens the way to Kiev, Krasny and Roslavl.

=== Remaining towers ===
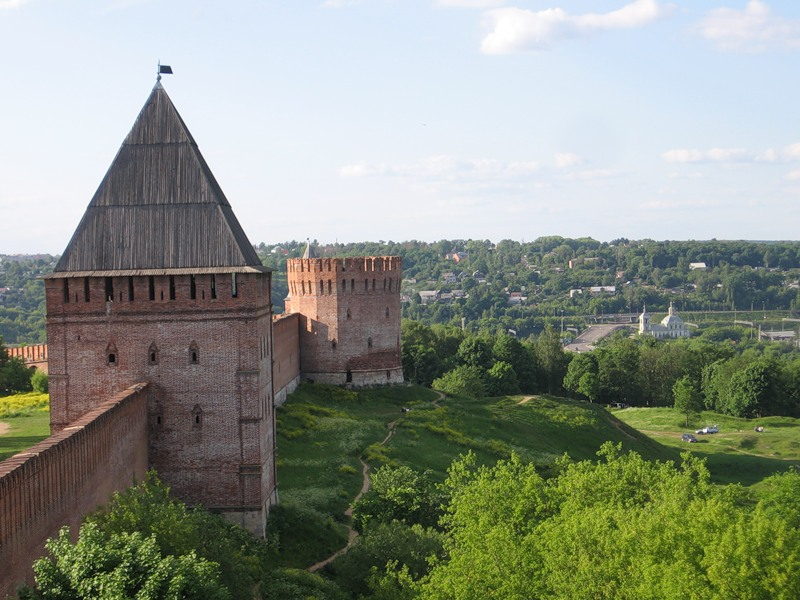
Another view of the Smolensk Kremlin

- Pyatnitskaya (Water Tower)
- Volkova
- Kostyrevskaya (Red Tower)
- Veselukha (Luchinskaya)
- Pozdnyakova (Rogovka)
- Oryol (Gorogetskaya)
- Avraamievskaya
- Zaaltarnaya (Belukha)
- Voronina
- Dolgochevskaya
- Zimbulka
- Nikolskaya
- Mokhovaya
- Donets
- Gromovaya
- Bubleika
- Kopytenskaya
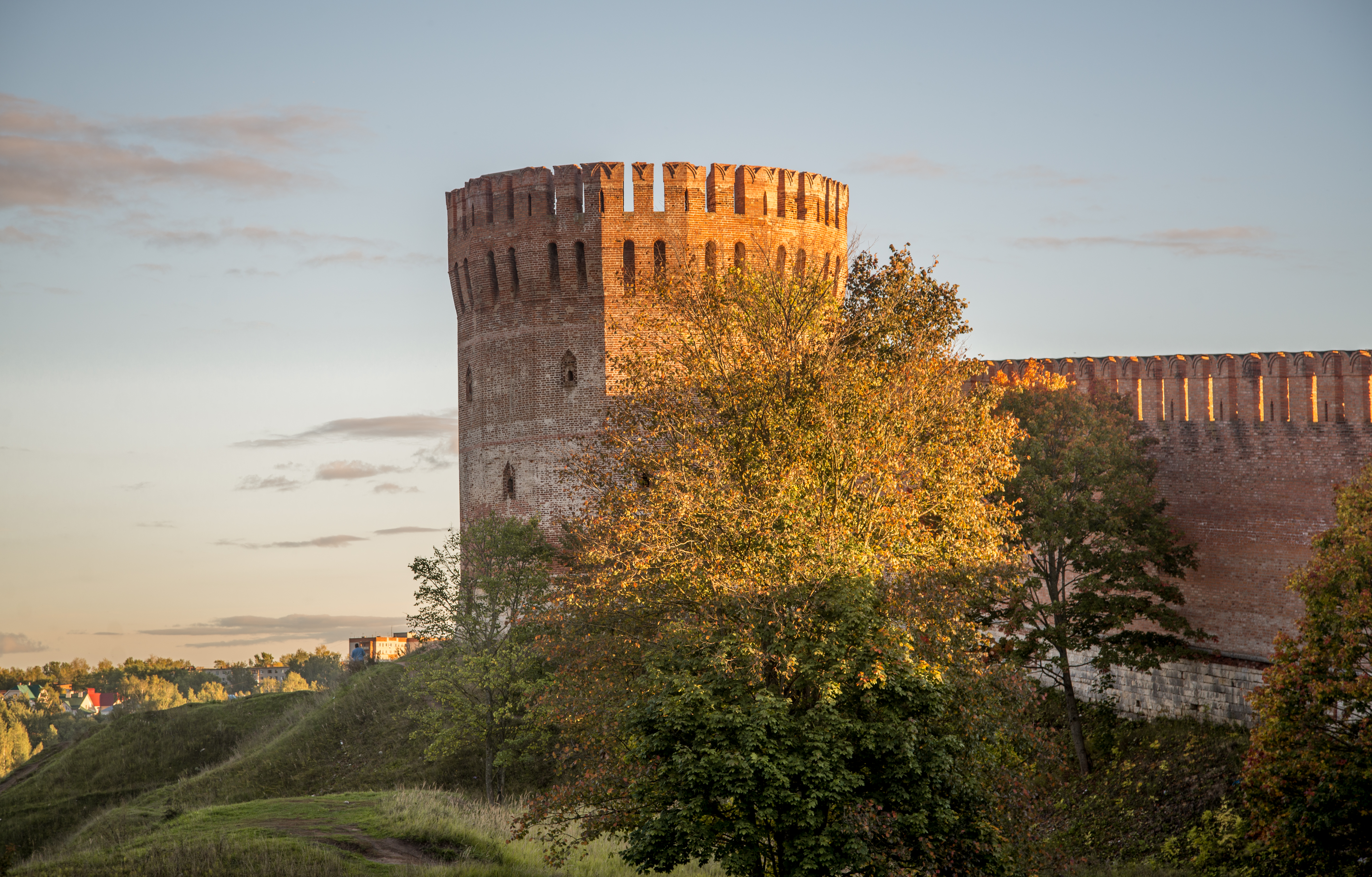
Oryol Tower

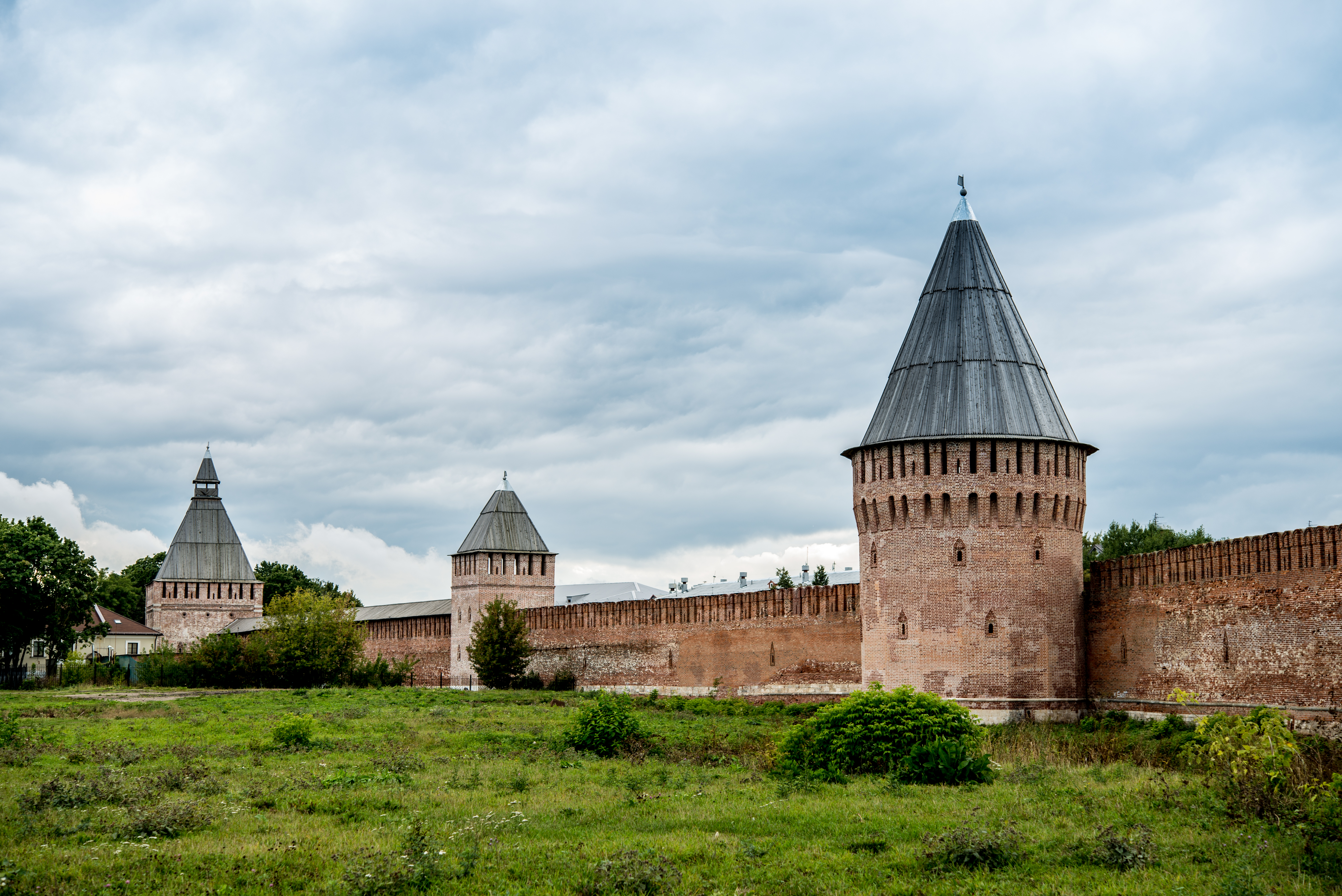
Dolgochevskaya Tower

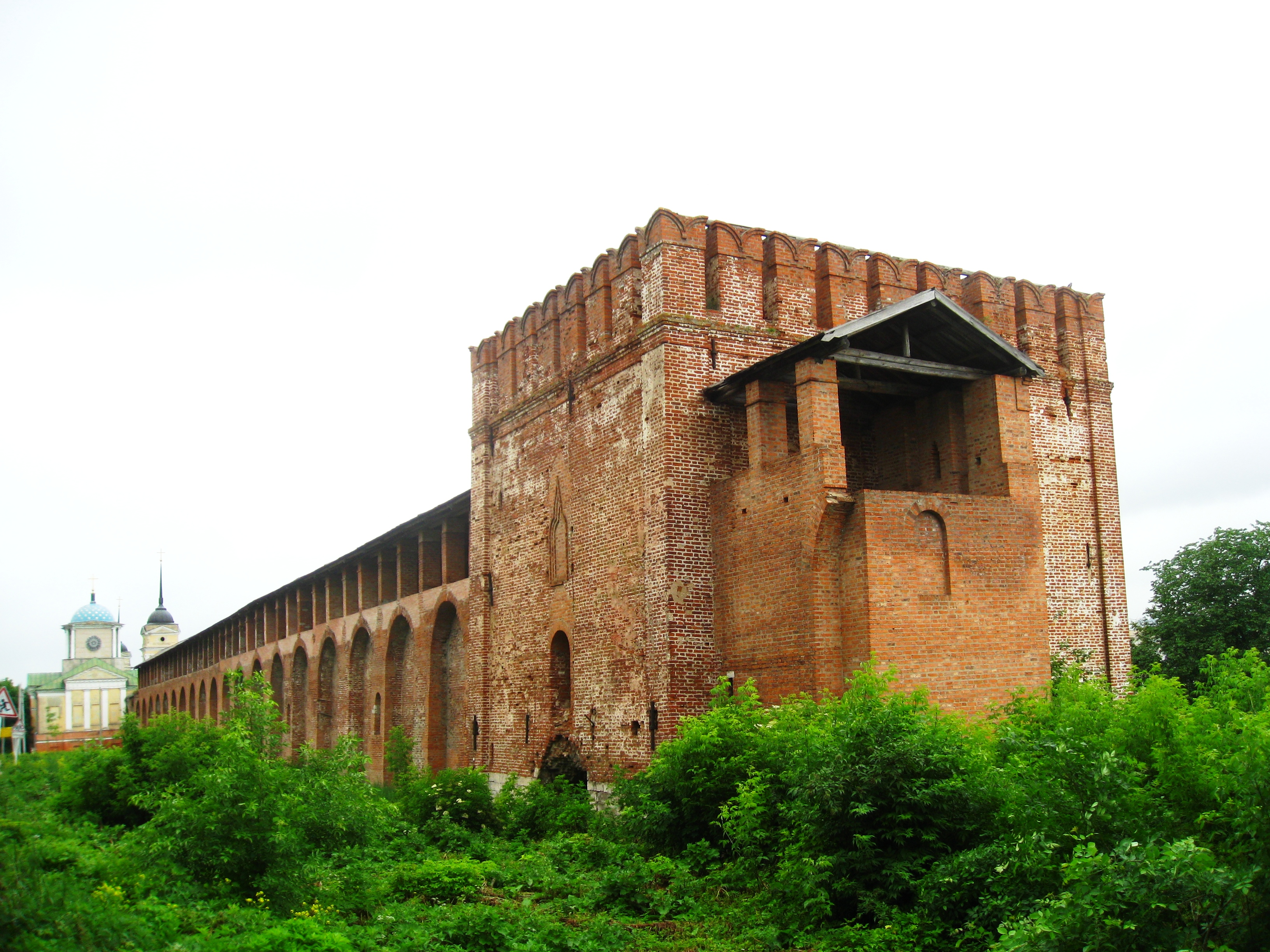
Volkova Tower

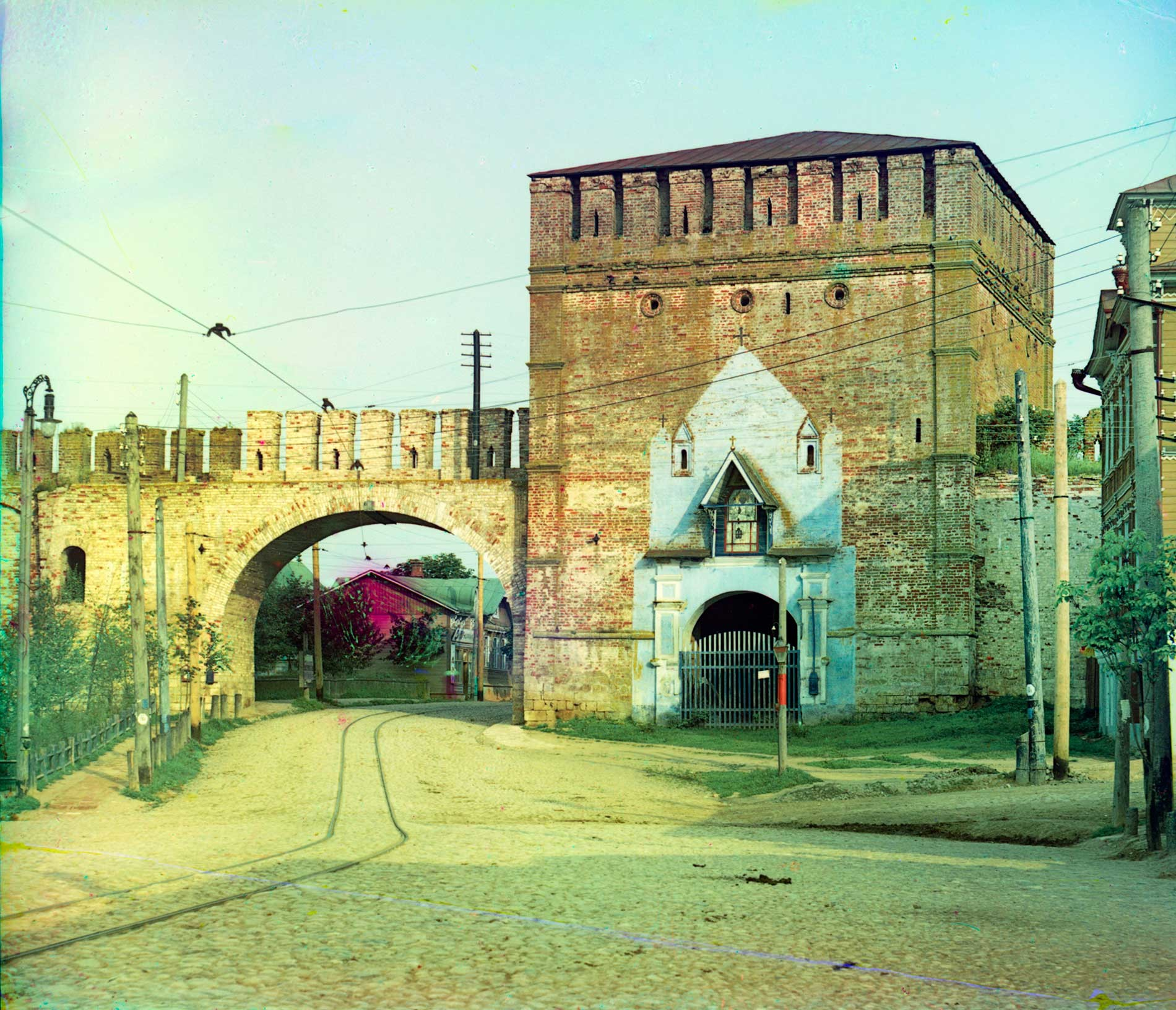
Nikolskaya Tower

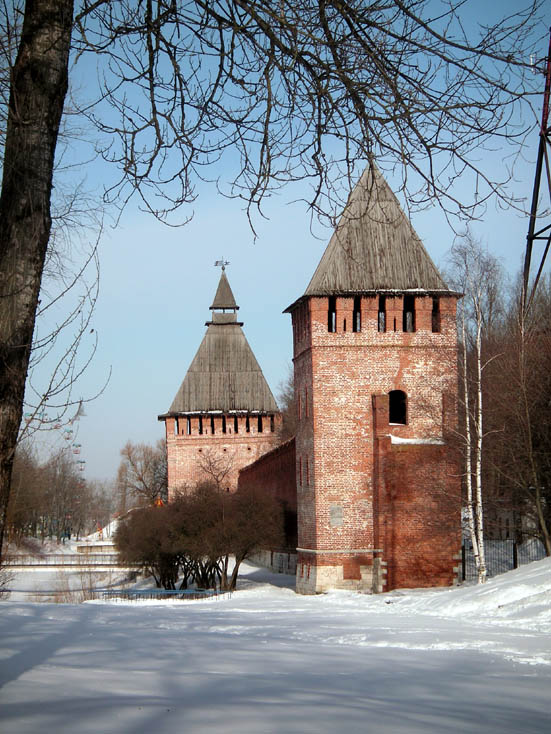
Bubleika Tower

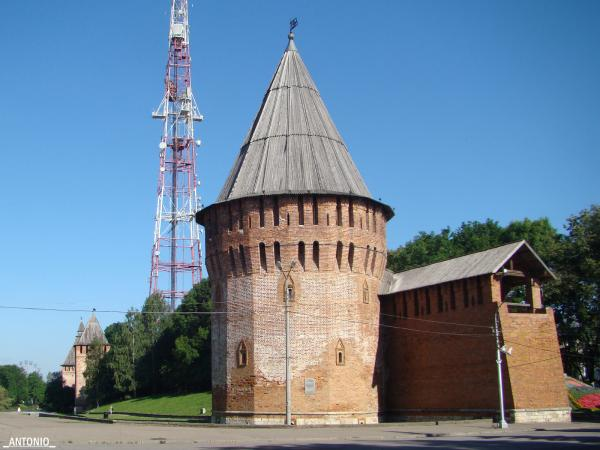
Gromovaya Tower

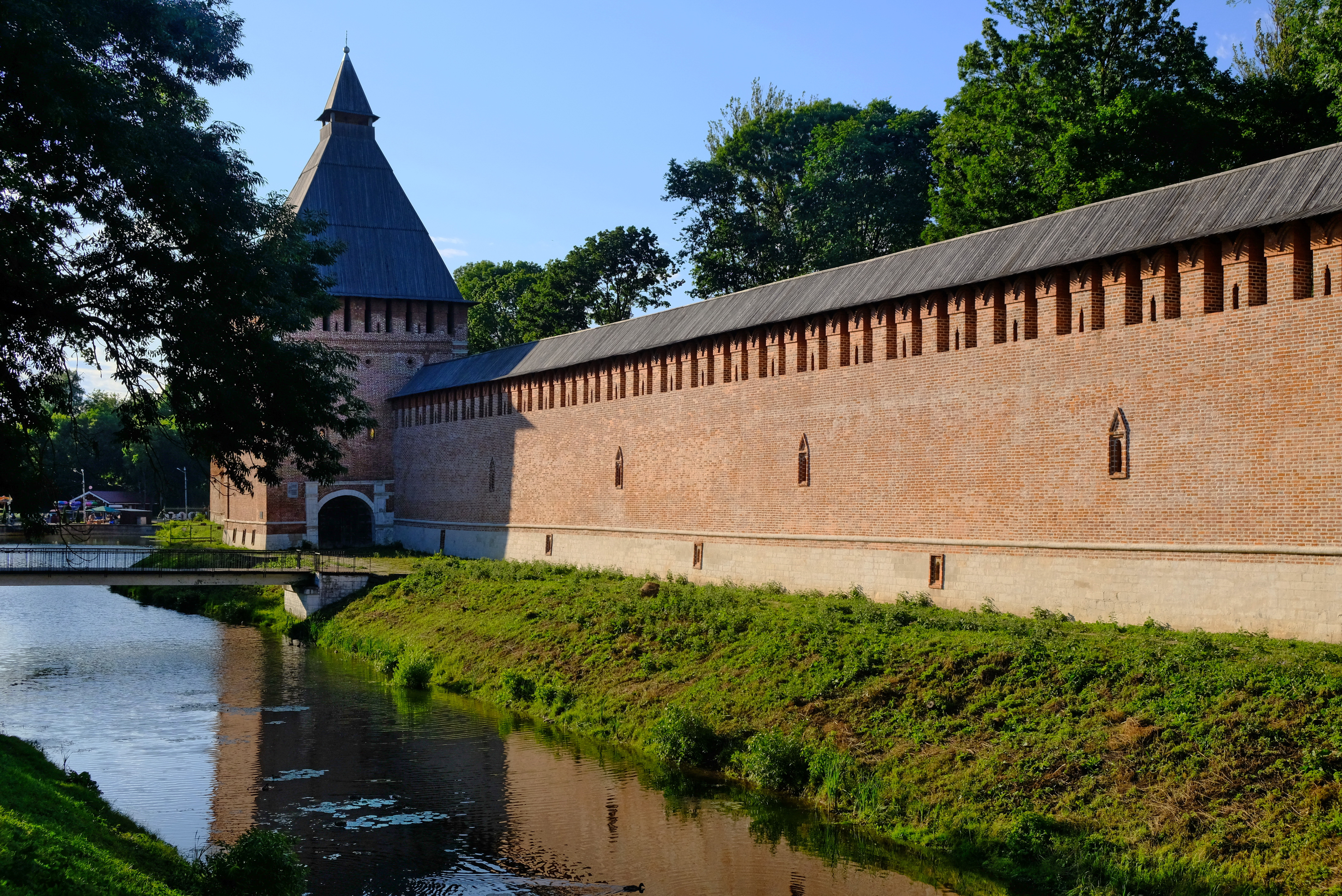
Kopytenskaya Tower

=== Destroyed towers ===
- Antifonovskaya
- Bogoslovskaya
- Ivorovskaya (Verzhenova)
- Pyatnitsa (Water Gate)
- Granovitaya (Faceted Tower)
- Gurkina
- Frolovskaya
- Evstafevskaya (Brikareva)
- Kassandalovskaya (Kozodavlevskaya, Artishevskaya)
- 2 unnamed round towers
- Krylosh Gate
- Lazarev Gate
- Molokhov Gate
- Mikulinskaya
- Stefanskaya
- Kolominskaya (Sheinova)
- Gorodetskaya (Semenovskaya)
- 3 unnamed quadrangular towers
