= Znamensky Theatre =

Historic theatre in Moscow (1769-1780

The Znamensky Theatre was a historic theatre in Moscow in Russia, active in 1769–1780. It was the third public theater in the city of Moscow and replaced Russian Theatre (1766-1769). It was housed in a wooden building owned by count Roman Illarionovich Vorontsov. It hosted public masquerade balls and public concerts as well as theatrical performances. It was burned in February 1780 and replaced by the Petrovka Theatre.
