= Russian Theatre, Moscow (1766–1769) =

The Russian Theatre was a historic theatre in Moscow in Russia, active in 1766–1769. It was the second public theater in the city of Moscow after the Maiden Field Theatre, and the first professional theatre in a proper theatre building, almost a decade prior to the Karl Knipper Theatre in Saint Petersburg. In 1769, the theater was moved to the Znamensky Theatre.
