= Bely Gorod =

Second concentric historic core area of Moscow

Coordinates: 55°45′04″N 37°37′42″E

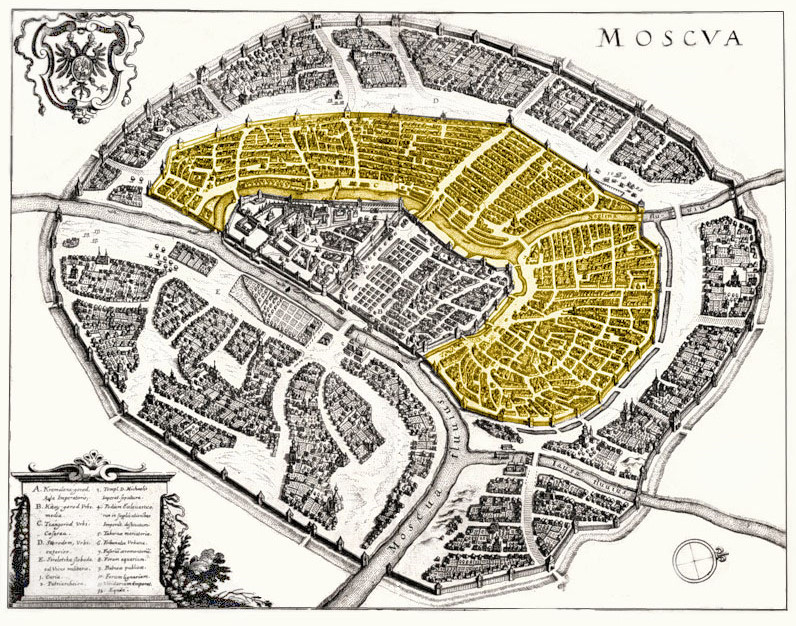
Bely Gorod (highlighted in yellow) on Matthäus Merian's map of Moscow

Bely Gorod (Russian: Бе́лый го́род, IPA: [ˈbʲelɨj ˈɡorət], lit. 'white city') is the central core area of Moscow, Russia beyond the Kremlin and Kitay-gorod.

The name comes from the color of its defensive wall, which was erected in 1585–1593 at the behest of tsar Feodor I and Boris Godunov by architect Fyodor Kon. The wall is 10 kilometers (6.2 mi) in length, and its width ranges up to 4.5 meters (15 ft) at its widest.

Bely Gorod had 28 towers and 11 gates, the names of some of which are still preserved in the names of squares, namely: Trehsvyatsky, Chertolsky (Prechistensky), Arbatsky, Nikitsky, Tversky, Petrovsky, Sretensky, Myasnitsky, Pokrovsky, Yauzskiy, Vasilievsky. The walls were cogged, like the Kremlin walls, with loopholes that allowed keeping a continuous fire.

During the reign of Catherine the Great and her grandson Alexander I the wall was demolished and replaced by a chain of boulevards, known as the Boulevard Ring.

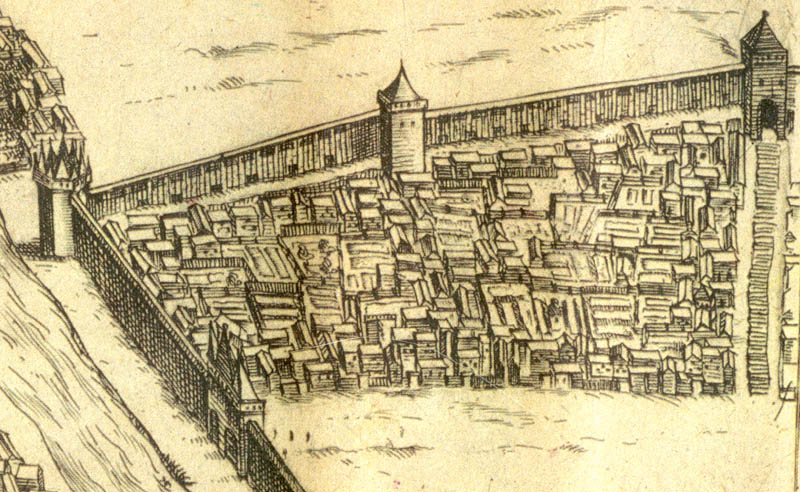
Semiverhaja tower, Vsehsvjatsky and Chertolsky (Prechistensky) gate on the plan of 1610

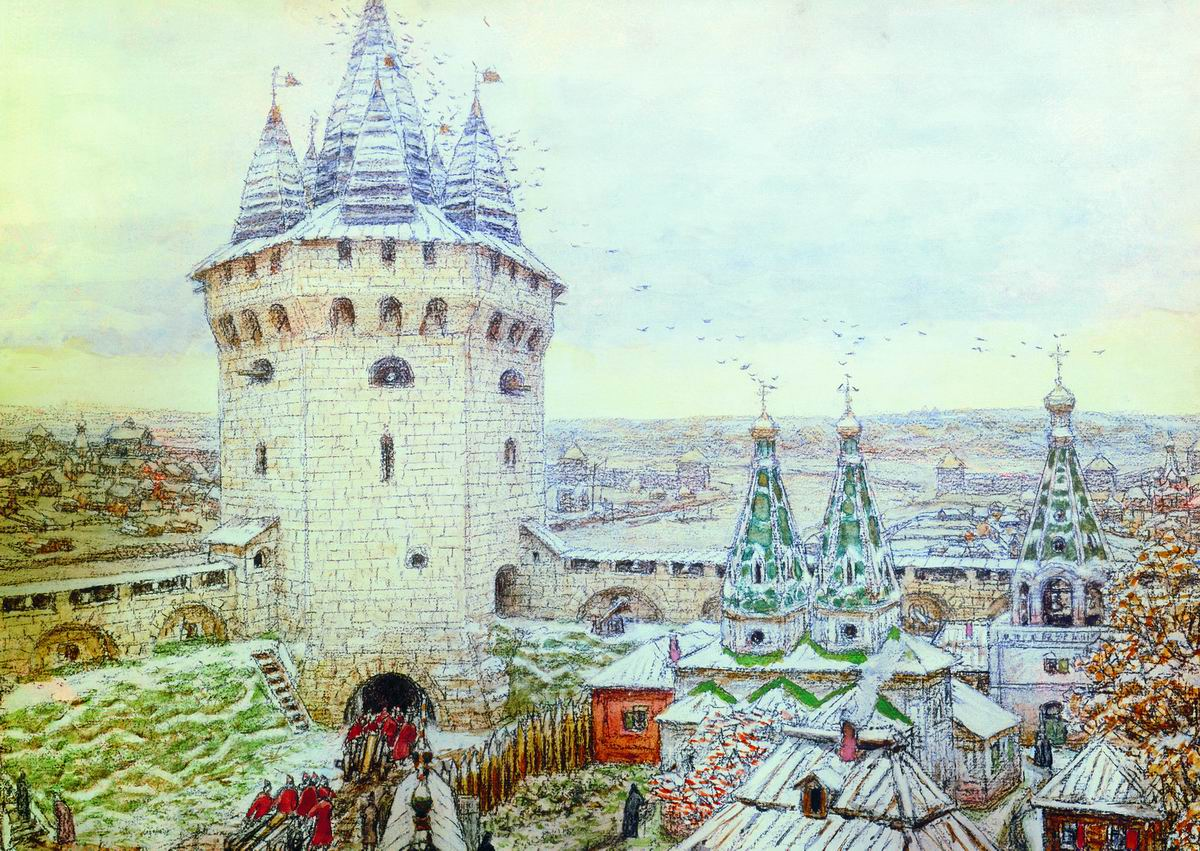
Semiverhaya (Seven-tops) angular tower. By Apollinary Vasnetsov

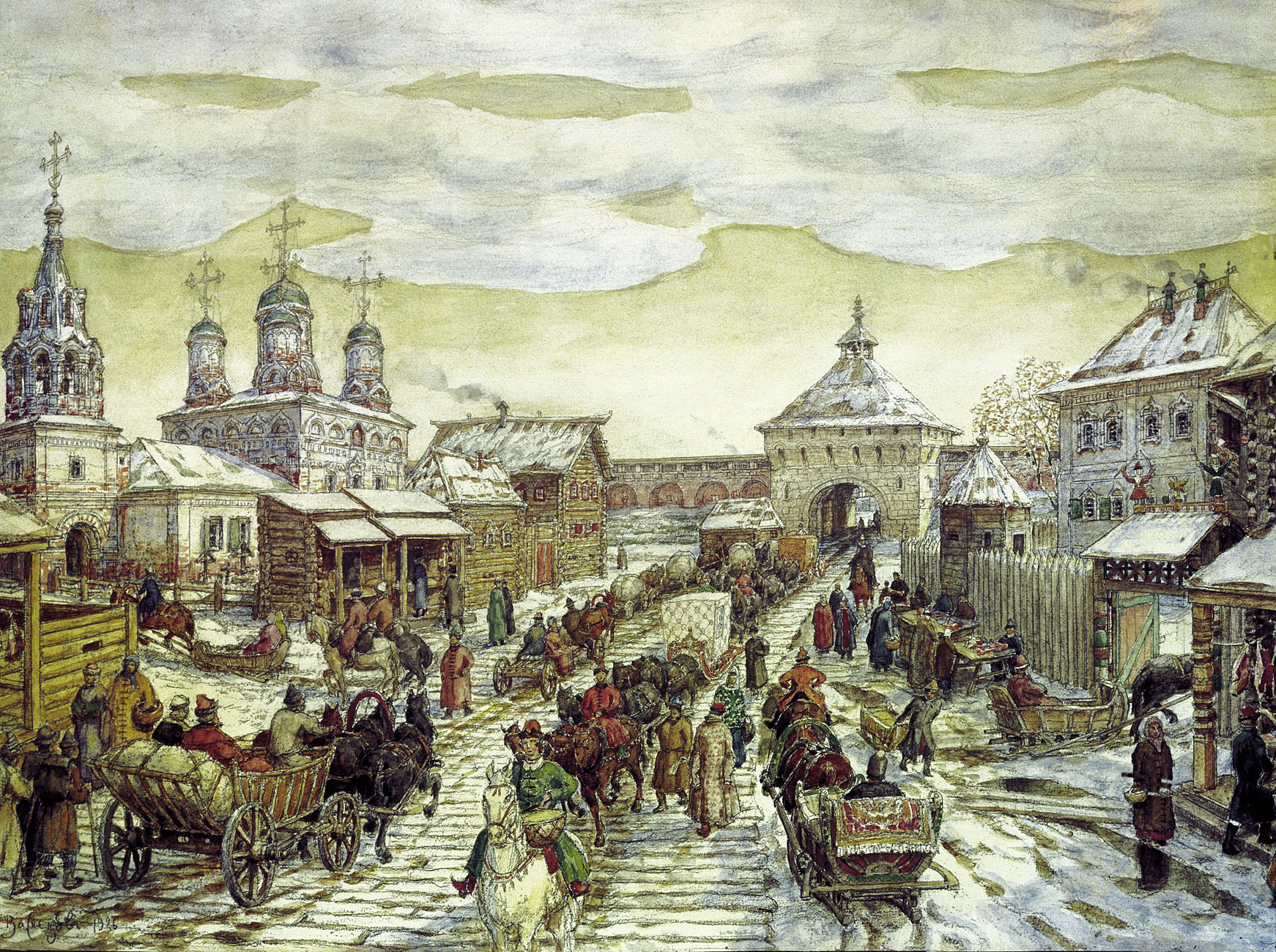
Myasnitsky Gate. By Apollinary Vasnetsov

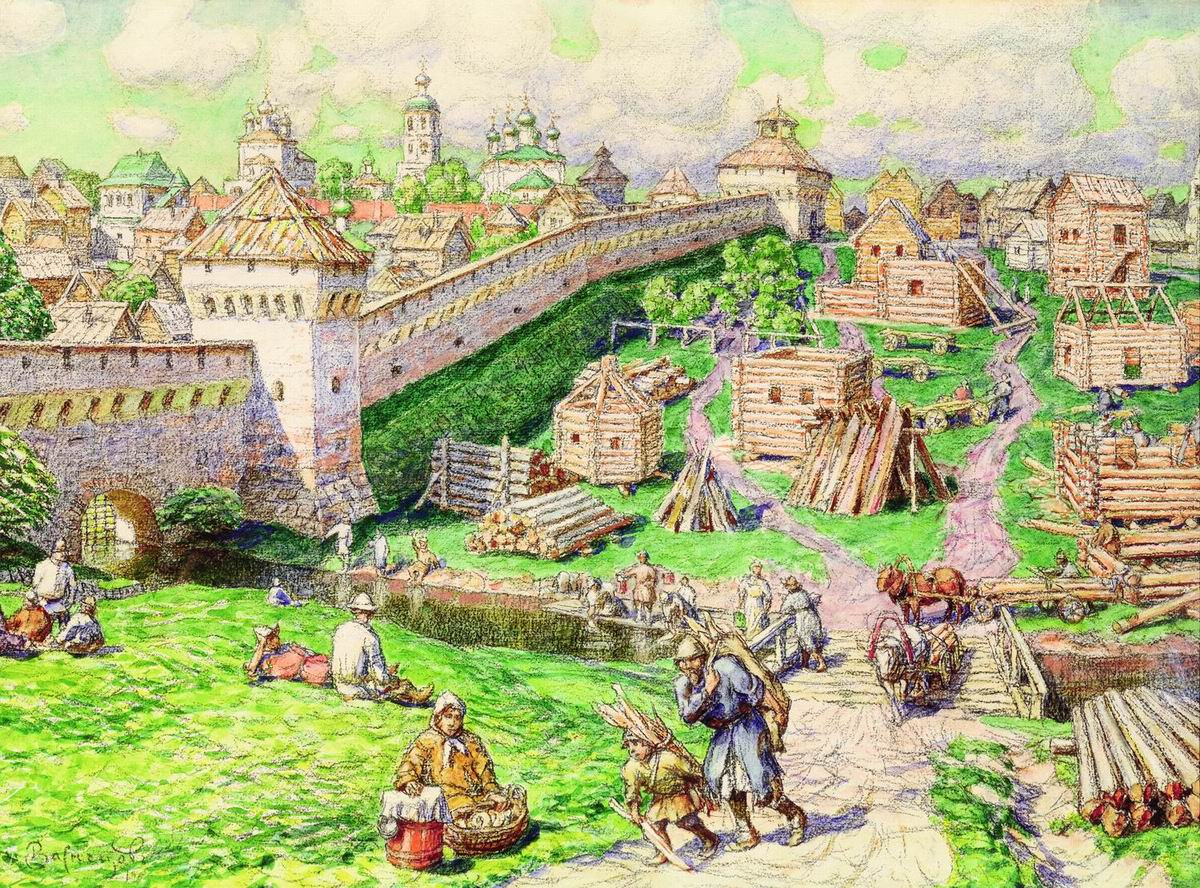
"Truba" ("Tube") at the river Neglinnaya. By Apollinary Vasnetsov

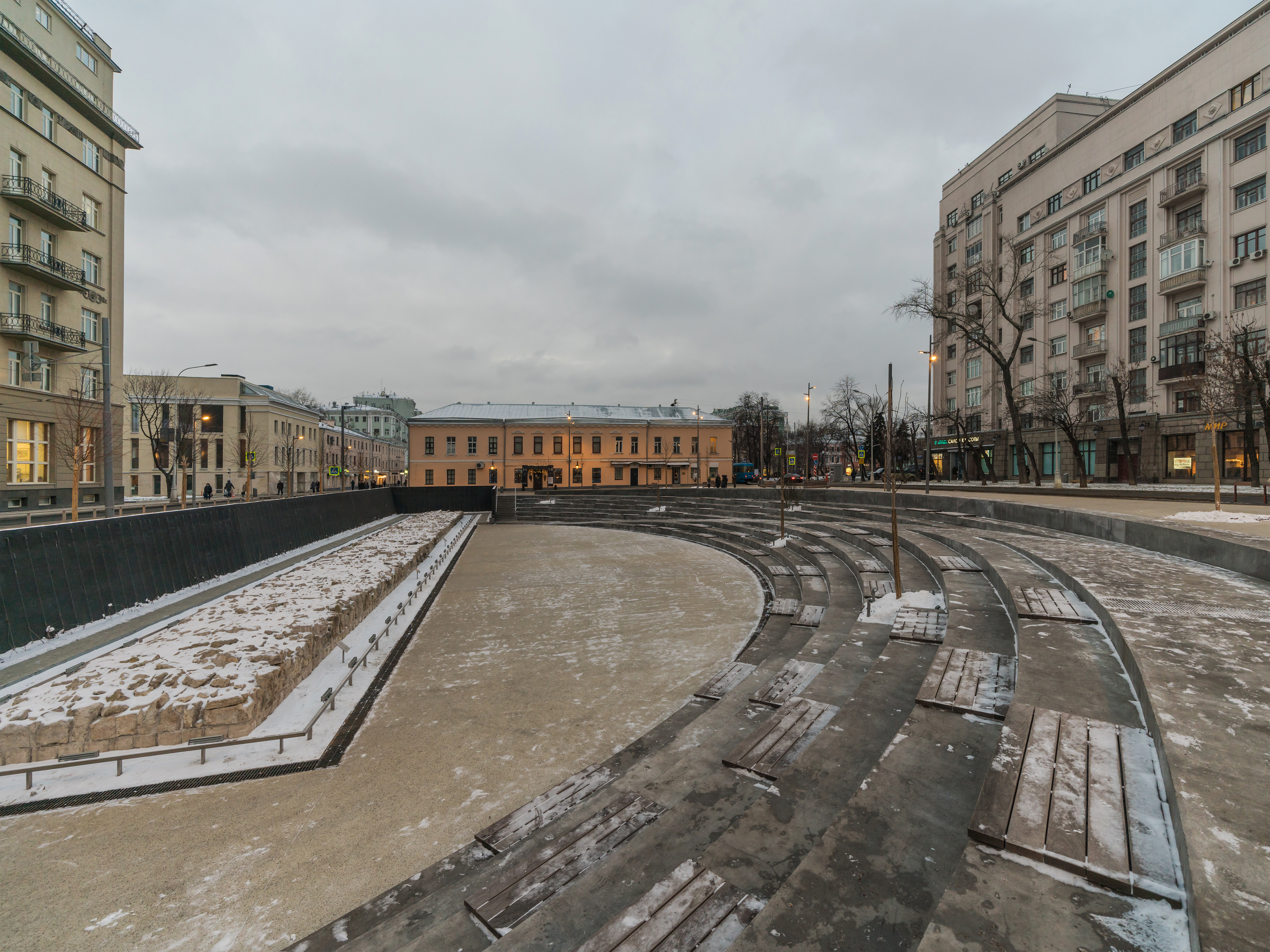
The remaining foundation of the wall at the Khokhlovskaya square
