= Merle Fainsod =

American political scientist

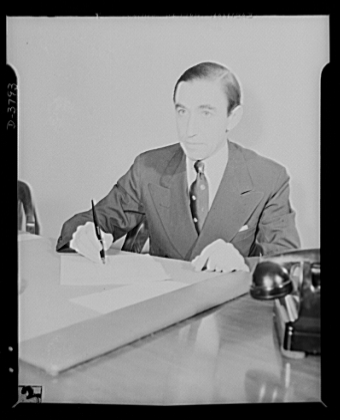
- Born: May 2, 1907
- Died: February 11, 1972 (aged 64)
- Alma mater: Harvard University; Washington University in St. Louis
- Position held: chair (1967–1968)

Merle Fainsod (May 2, 1907 – February 11, 1972) was an American political scientist best known for his work on public administration and as a scholar of the Soviet Union. His books Smolensk under Soviet Rule, based on documents captured by the German Army during World War II, and How Russia is Ruled (also known as How the Soviet Union is Governed) helped form the basis of American study of the Soviet Union, and established him "as a leading political scientist of the Soviet Union." Fainsod is also remembered for his work in the Office of Price Administration and as the director of the Harvard University Library.

== Biography ==
Fainsod was born in McKees Rocks, Pennsylvania on May 2, 1907, and spent his childhood years there. In 1920, after the death of his father, Fainsod's family moved to St. Louis. Fainsod attended Washington University in St. Louis, graduating in 1928 with a B.A. in political science and an M.A. in 1930. He then began his Ph.D. at Harvard University in government, completing it in only 2 years.

In 1932, Fainsod traveled to the Soviet Union on a Sheldon Fellowship, gaining his first exposure to the country. In 1933, he returned to the United States and began teaching in the government department at Harvard. Upon his return to the United States he also married Elizabeth Stix, with whom he had two children.

Throughout the 1930s, most of Fainsod's work focused on the United States, and he published the books The American People and their Government and Government and the American Economy. Because of his expertise on American government, he was chosen as a staff member for the Brownlow Committee in 1936. In 1940, he was chosen as a consultant for the Temporary National Economic Committee, and in 1941, when America entered World War II, he was selected as a price executive for the Office of Price Administration(OPA). In April 1942, he was chosen to direct the retail trade and services division of the OPA.

After the war, Fainsod was promoted to full professor at Harvard, and continued his work in research and teaching. That same year, he was selected to serve as the chairman of the Government Department, a position he held until 1949. As the Cold War emerged, Fainsod took a renewed interest in the Soviet Union and helped to establish the Russian Research Center at Harvard in 1948, which he directed from 1959 to 1964. Fainsod encouraged other scholars of the Soviet Union to use an interdisciplinary area studies approach, and he helped to "refocus scholars' understanding of the Soviet Union."

In the 1950s, Fainsod focused on the Soviet Union with his landmark works How Russia is Ruled (1953) and Smolensk under Soviet Rule (1958) using Smolensk Archive documents. He was elected to the American Academy of Arts and Sciences in 1950. In the 1960s, he held numerous leadership positions at Harvard. He was elected to the American Philosophical Society in 1961. From 1966 to 1967, he served as president of the American Political Science Association and from 1964 to 1972 he served as director of the Harvard University Library. In 1969 after violence and unrest on the Harvard campus, Fainsod led the Fainsod Committee to study the issue of reform to Harvard's government. On the committee, Fainsod "called for unity" and helped to bring together students and administrators.

Fainsod died of a heart attack on February 11, 1972 in the Harvard hospital.

== Scholarship ==
Most of Fainsod's scholarship and writing focused on either public administration or the Soviet Union. Over his career, he published five books as well as many journal articles and book chapters. Of his scholarship, his work on the Soviet Union became most important, and his book How Russia is Ruled "became a classic and was used for decades as a textbook."

=== The American People and Their Government ===
In 1934, Fainsod co-authored the book The American People and Their Government with Arnold Lien. The book was a textbook, intended primarily for junior colleges. In addition to providing basic facts about government, the book attempted to "teach patriotism, citizenship, and a proper zeal for the Americanization of aliens." The book was rather poorly received. Grayson Kirk expressed "skepticism over the value of the finished product", and wrote that "the idea behind the book is much better than the book itself."

=== International Socialism and the World War ===
Fainsod revised his doctoral dissertation and published it in 1935 as International Socialism and the World War. The book analyzed the reactions of international socialist parties to World War I, dividing them into three groups. According to Fainsod, the first group, right wing socialists, wholeheartedly supported their national governments in the war and refrained from contact with other socialist parties and international groups. The second group, centrist socialists, "voted for the war credits only to maintain the unity of their respective parties," and maintained a pacifist position as well as taking part in international conferences. The final group, left wing socialists, opposed the war and attempted to spread agitation and revolution.

Reviewers received the book favorably. Writing in the Annals of the American Academy of Political and Social Science, Edward Berman called the book "an excellent and informative account." Leading Soviet scholar E.H. Carr called the book "a most valuable piece of research," and Arnold Zurcher faulted the book for "repetition of subject-matter" but praised the "superior quality" of the research involved.

=== Government and the American Economy ===
In 1941, Fainsod released his third book, Government and the American Economy, co-authored with Lincoln Gordon. Intended as a textbook, the book presented the "economic, organizational, legal, and constitutional setting" for American business and discussed the evolution of the role of the government in the economy over the first half of the twentieth century. In examining the relationship, the book primarily focused on political matters, and did not present any significant discussion of monetary policy, a fact criticized by Oscar Gass in the University of Chicago Law Review.

Despite criticizing the omission of monetary policy, Gass praised the volume, writing that it was "distinguished for its penetrating economic analysis." Henry Villard delivered a less positive review. He wrote that "as a source of information on the legal and institutional framework within which the American economy operates ... this volume is very valuable," but concluded by faulting the lack of analysis in the book, labeling it "unrealistic" and "unenlightening." John George, writing in the American Political Science Review presented a much more positive outlook, writing, "this book easily places first in its field."

=== How Russia is Ruled ===
In 1953, Fainsod finished his book How Russia is Ruled. The book analyzed Soviet governance from the very beginnings of the Soviet Union until the death of Joseph Stalin, which occurred only months prior to the book's release. In the How Russia is Ruled, Fainsod "carefully described and analyzed" both the theory and practice of public administration in the Soviet Union.

Philip Buck wrote that the book was "of great interest to the general reader," but found that it had less utility for serious scholars, criticizing in particular the lack of details on Soviet economic planning. Writing in Political Science Quarterly, Leo Gruliow presented a generally favorable review of the book, but criticized its lack of detailed analysis on the Soviet propaganda and indoctrination efforts.

In 1963, Fainsod released a revised edition of How Russia is Ruled. By that time, the original book was recognized as "one of the most authoritative interpretations of Soviet reality" and had become very influential among Sovietologists. In the revised edition, Fainsod used new sources of data on the Soviet Union to help expand on many of the themes in the first edition, and devoted more attention to the post-Stalin era. In the revised edition, Fainsod also took into account certain changes in international dynamics, including the increasing role of nuclear weapons, the Sino-Soviet split and some of the liberalization in the USSR. In 1997, Foreign Affairs named the book on its list of "significant books" and called How Russia is Ruled "the book that defined the field of Soviet studies."

=== Smolensk under Soviet Rule ===
In 1958, Fainsod released another book on the Soviet Union, Smolensk under Soviet Rule. The book was based on internal Communist party documents captured by the German Army after overrunning the city of Smolensk. After the defeat of Germany, the United States took control of the documents, which were given to Fainsod in the 1950s. These documents were "the most extensive documentary corroboration" of information on the Soviet Union available at the time. Based on the documents, Fainsod presented strong arguments about the power of Stalin during his lifetime, and argued that the party itself became merely a transmission mechanism for Stalin's ideas. Fainsod also presented many insights into the inner workings of Soviet governance before World War II.

Although generally well received at the time, Smolensk under Soviet Rule found less of a place in later scholarship than How Russia is Ruled. In 1991, Catherine Merridale wrote in the Slavic Review: "Fainsod's interpretation has dated," but she still praised some aspects of the book, including its study of the NKVD and dekulakization. Similarly, Irving Anellis in 1996 hailed the book as "one of the most significant sovietological studies of its day," but argued that Fainsod's conceptual models and theories had not stood the test of time.
