= Maiden Field Theatre =

18th-century theatre in Moscow, Russia

The Maiden Field Theatre was a historic theatre in Moscow in Russia, active in 1765–1771. It was the first public theater in the city of Moscow. The theater was founded by a decree of Catherine the Great and was housed in a house built more in the manner of a stadium rather than a proper roofed theatre. It lived on government support and provided performances to the public by half professional actors. It was soon given competition by a professional theatre, the Russian Theatre (1766-1769).
