= Smolensk Archive =

Soviet archives captured in 1941

The Smolensk Archive is the name given to the archives of Smolensk Oblast Communist Party of the Soviet Union, which were captured intact by the army of Nazi Germany when it conquered the city of Smolensk in 1941. It also included the NKVD and the Smolensk State Oblast archives. The archive was then moved to Germany.

== History ==
In summer and autumn of 1941, and again in the summer of 1942 during the advance of German troops, local authorities tried to evacuate archives to the east, and the vast majority of the local archives were moved at great cost. German troops entered Smolensk on July 15, 1941, and as a result, the archive was seized by the Germans and they made propaganda out of it by publishing the documents about repression. In May 1943 the archive was taken by the Germans from Smolensk to Vilnius, then in Poland, where it was isolated from much other material taken to Germany. The remaining part of the documents in Poland were found by Soviet troops in February 1945 in the area of the railway station Pszczyna and returned to Smolensk.

Soon the documents became known to the U.S. Office of Strategic Services, (the predecessor of the CIA). It was stored at the U.S. restitution center at Offenbach. After that, the documents were moved to an underground hangar. A group of American Sovietologists studied the inventory and some original documents and concluded that they contained valuable information. In 1958, the U.S. government offered to return archival materials to the Soviet Union, but in response the Soviet authorities claimed that it was a fake concocted by the CIA.

Records of the archive, particularly the Communist Party documents, covered the years before 1917 to 1941. The archive documents were available for use by American and other Western scholars, who could not get access to party or KGB archives in the Soviet Union. The first historian to make use of the Smolensk materials was Harvard University professor Merle Fainsod, who published Smolensk under Soviet Rule in 1958 based on the archive. The archival documents were also used in the writings of Richard Pipes on early Soviet history and Robert Conquest in his book The Great Terror.

Since 1963, the Soviet authorities began to attempt to acquire the archive, but nevertheless a public acknowledgement of its authenticity was not made. An account revealed that the acceptance of the offer was viewed by the Soviet Ministry of Foreign Affairs as impractical because such a move was tantamount to an official recognition of the authenticity of the documents. Only in 1991 did the Russian authorities acknowledge and publicly announce that the U.S. has in its possession a genuine archive, and that Russia intends to seek its return. Negotiations regarding possible transfer began in 1992. However, U.S. authorities linked the return of the archive with the return of the Chabad-Lubavitch Hasidic movement's "Schneerson library". As a result, the archive was returned to Russia only at the end of 2002.
